= Daniel Wakefield (judge) =

New Zealand judge (1798–1858)

Daniel Bell Wakefield (27 February 1798 – 8 January 1858) was born in Burnham-on-Crouch, Essex, England. He practised law in London and was involved in planning a colony in South Australia. He migrated to New Zealand in 1842 where he served as attorney general for New Munster Province, and as a temporary judge in the Supreme Court.

== Early life ==
Daniel Bell Wakefield was the third child and second son of Edward Wakefield (1774–1854), a distinguished surveyor and land agent, and Susanna Crush (1767–1816). His grandmother, Priscilla Wakefield (1751–1832), was a popular author for the young, and one of the introducers of savings banks. He was the brother of Catherine Gurney Wakefield (1793–1873), the mother of Charles Torlesse (1825–1866); Edward Gibbon Wakefield (1796–1862); Arthur Wakefield (1799–1843); William Hayward Wakefield (1801–1848); John Howard Wakefield (1803–1862); Felix Wakefield (1807–1875); Priscilla Susannah Wakefield (1809–1887); Percy Wakefield (1810–1832); and an unnamed child born in 1813.

In 1824, Daniel Wakefield eloped with and married Selina Elizabeth de Burgh. They had a son, Charles Wakefield. His son Charles and wife Selina Elizabeth both died in 1828. In 1835 Wakefield married Angela Attwood, daughter of Thomas Attwood. They had three children: Selina in 1837, Charles Marcus in 1838, and Alice Mary who was born in New Zealand on 9 October 1849.

After obtaining his law degree, Wakefield practised in London as a member of Lincoln's Inn. He drafted a Bill for the formation of a Colony in South Australia that was accepted by the Secretary of State for the Colonies with some provisos. The Adelaide Street Naming Committee rewarded his efforts by naming Wakefield Street in his honour.

== New Zealand ==
Daniel Wakefield immigrated alone under a false name 'Bowler' to New Zealand in 1842, living first in New Plymouth and later moving to Wellington. In 1844, he was elected as head of a committee charged with forming the local militia. In 1847 he was named attorney general for New Munster Province, a post he held until 1853. He served as temporary judge in the Supreme Court in 1855–56.

He died in Wellington on 8 January 1858.
