= Priscilla Wakefield =

English Quaker and writer (1751–1832)

Priscilla Wakefield, née Priscilla Bell (31 January 1751 – 12 September 1832) was an English Quaker philanthropist and prolific author. She promoted social projects for the benefit of women and children such as schools and maternity hospitals. Her writings were wide-ranging: she wrote about feminist economics, as well as scientific subjects, in particular the popular eighteenth-century discipline of botany. She was widely known for her moral and instructional writings for children.

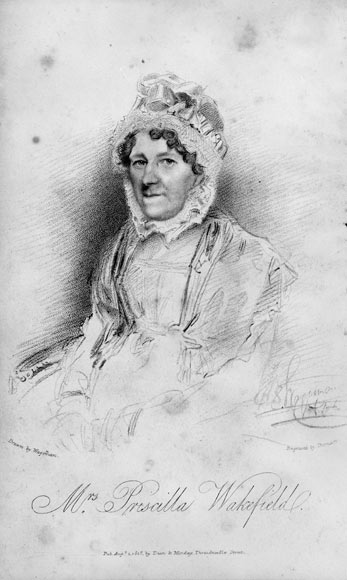
Priscilla Wakefield.

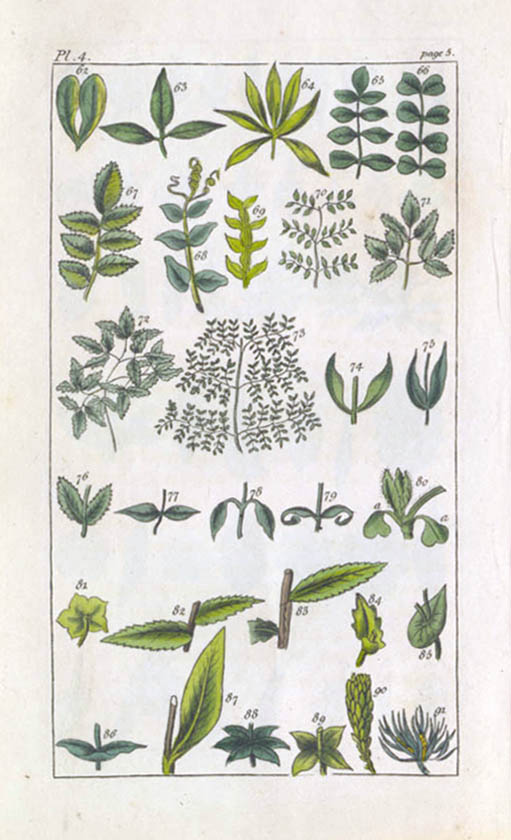
Plate 4 from Priscilla Wakefield, An Introduction to Botany, 1796.

== Life ==
Priscilla Bell was born into a family in Tottenham, then a Middlesex village north of London. Her father was Daniel Bell of nearby Stamford Hill. His wife Catherine was the granddaughter of the Quaker theologian Robert Barclay. She was one of several sisters, one of whom, Catherine Bell, married John Gurney of Earlham Hall and had many notable children, the best-known being Elizabeth Fry.

In adult life, Wakefield remained a member of the Society of Friends, and conformed to their religious practices, but did not observe the restrictions on dress or abstinence from amusements.

She married Edward Wakefield (1750–1826), a London merchant, and had three children. Writing to support her family financially, she wrote 17 books in two decades. She was one of many female English writers at the end of the 18th century who began to demand a broader life for women. Charities which she founded included a maternity hospital, a Female Benefit Club, and a penny bank for children, which developed into England's first savings bank.

The Wakefields had five children, of whom three survived to adulthood. The two surviving sons were Edward Wakefield (1774–1854) and Daniel Wakefield. The surviving daughter, Isabella (3 March 1773 – 17 October 1841), married Joshua Head of Ipswich on 12 September 1794. Her grandchildren included Edward Gibbon Wakefield, Daniel Bell Wakefield, William Hayward Wakefield, Arthur Wakefield and Felix Wakefield.

Wakefield died at the house of her daughter, Isabella Head, on Albion Hill, Ipswich, on 12 September 1832, and was buried on 20 December in the Friends' burial ground at the town's New Meeting House.

A portrait of Wakefield, her husband Edward Wakefield and her sister, Catherine Bell Gurney, painted by Francis Wheatley, was exhibited in South Kensington in 1868. A portrait in lithograph appears in the London Friends' Institute.

== Writing ==
Wakefield wrote books on a range of subjects, including natural science, feminism, and economics. She also wrote children's literature.

Wakefield published a book on feminism in 1798, Reflection on the Present Condition of the Female Sex; with Suggestions for its Improvement, which came out under the radical publisher Joseph Johnson. Although this is concerned with how women could become financially independent, it takes a traditional view of their role in society. Wakefield examined women's prospects for employment in the modern world in light of Adam Smith's writings, and supported broader education for women. However, she thought better education for women would make them better wives, rather than advocating education for its own sake.

Wakefield was widely known as a writer of moral guides for children. Her early publication, Juvenile Anecdotes, Founded on Facts, was successful, and she went on to publish other books of the same nature and of a more advanced character, dealing with science and travel. She was the first woman to write scientific books for children.

Wakefield had considerable knowledge of botany and natural history, and in 1796 published the popular An Introduction to Botany, in a Series of Familiar Letters, which was translated into French in 1801 and reached an eleventh edition in 1841. It was illustrated with a series of uncredited full-page illustrations showing plant parts in detail. It was followed by An Introduction to the Natural History and Classification of Insects, in a Series of Letters.

By the time she died, Wakefield had written two dozen books, many having appeared in several editions and been translated into foreign languages.

== Philanthropy ==
Wakefield was an active philanthropist, promoting education, womens rights, maternity provision and savings banks for the poor in Tottenham. She formed the Lying-in Charity for Women in 1791. It supplied poor pregnant women with midwifery care and an initial supply of linen and baby clothes as well as a small amount of money. It was supported by annual subscription and continued into the 19th century.

In 1792, Wakefield co-founded the School for Industry, which taught girls reading, writing, sewing, knitting and arithmetic. In 1798. she founded the first "frugality bank" in England, to help those on low incomes save money. Members paid according to age a monthly sum that would give them sick pay and a pension at 60. Women and children were encouraged to save what they could of their income. Similar savings banks were set up nationally, but they were effectively nationalised when the Post Office Savings Bank was founded in 1865.

== Legacy ==
Priscilla Wakefield House, a nursing care home in Seven Sisters, London is named after her.

== Selected works ==
- Mental Improvement: Or, the Beauties and Wonders of Nature and Art, 1794
- An Introduction to Botany, in a Series of Familiar Letters, London, 12mo 1796
- Juvenile Anecdotes, Founded on Facts, 1795-8 (2 well received volumes that went to an eighth edition in 1825)
- Reflections on the Present Condition of the Female Sex, With Suggestions for Its Improvement, 1798
- The Juvenile Travellers: Containing the Remarks of A Family During a Tour Through the Principal States and Kingdoms of Europe, 1801 (her most popular work of imaginative fiction reaching the 19th edition in 1850)
- Domestic Recreation: Or, Dialogues Illustrative of Natural and Scientific Subjects, 1805
- Sketches of Human Manners, 1807
- An Introduction to the Natural History and Classification of Insects, in a Series of Letters, London, 1816, 12mo.

== Bibliography ==
- Riddehough, Geoffrey (1958). "Priscilla Wakefield". The Dalhousie Review. 37 (4): 341–347. hdl:10222/62828.
