= Tuamarina Cemetery =

Cemetery in Marlborough, New Zealand

Coordinates: 41°25′37″S 173°57′40″E

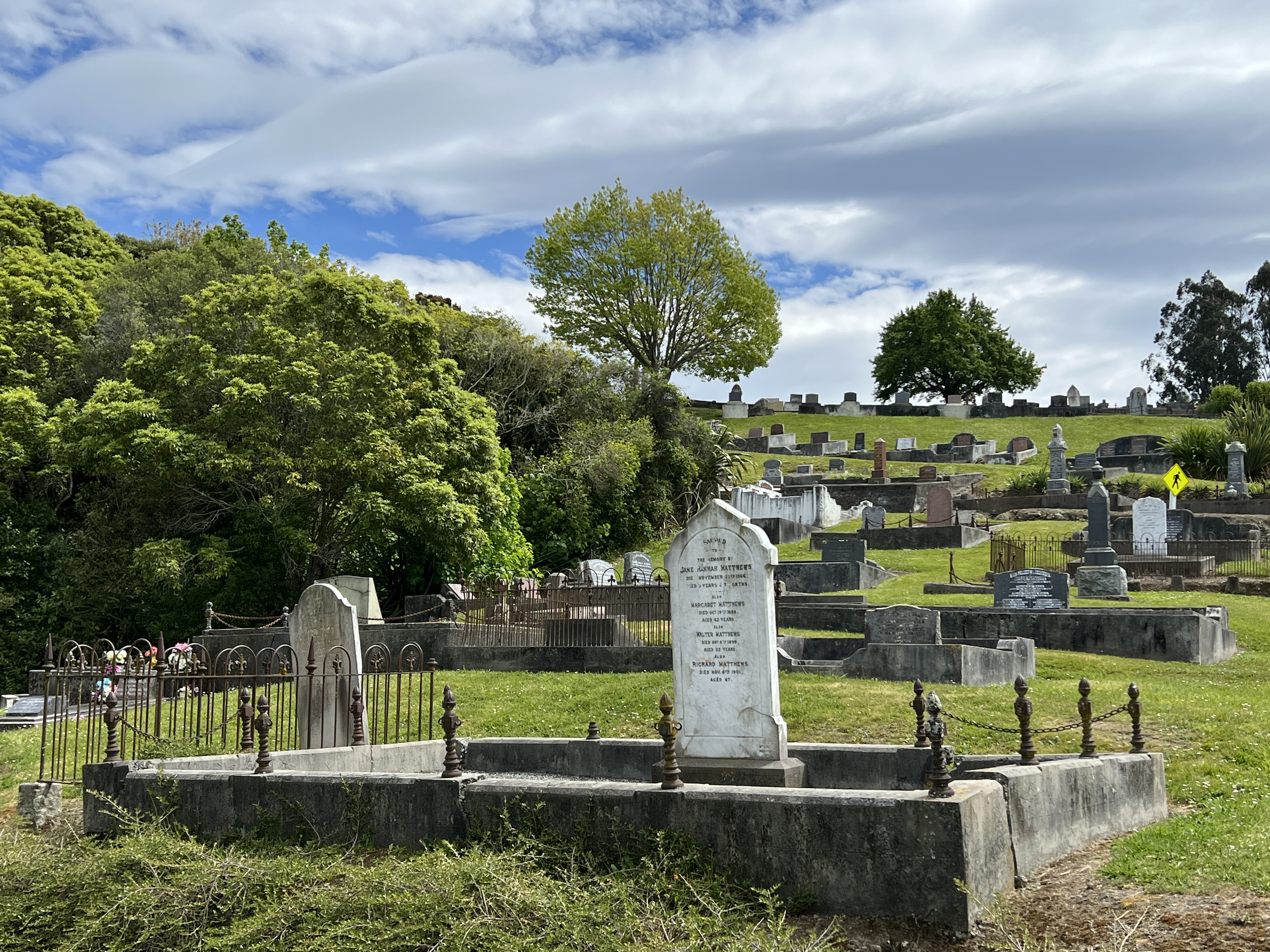
Tuamarina Cemetery from the east

Tuamarina Cemetery is one of the largest cemeteries in the Marlborough Region of New Zealand. The cemetery predates Omaka Cemetery and has been open to the public for burials since 1866, notwithstanding the burials of twenty two men there in 1843.

== History ==
The site of Tuamarina Cemetery was first used for burials in 1843, when the Rev. Samuel Ironside interred most of the twenty two men who were killed during the Wairau Affray, the first clash of arms between British settlers and Māori in New Zealand after the signing of the Treaty of Waitangi. After fighting began, many of the surviving party of British settlers retreated to the top of the hill, where they surrendered and were subsequently killed as utu. Felix Wakefield designated the area as a cemetery and was instrumental in the installation of a monument to the deceased. On 9 March 1866 the monument was unveiled by William Henry Eyes and Wakefield in a large ceremony. The original monument face was updated in 1869 after multiple spelling errors were noted.

Inside the cemetery is also a memorial to the soldiers from the Marlborough region killed during the Second Boer War. The memorial was unveiled on 3 June 1904 in the presence of a large audience. Also present is a 1917 75 mm Skoda Howitzer, brought back to New Zealand in the 1920s, which acts as a memorial to all servicemen and women buried in the cemetery.

Below the cemetery is also the Eileen Duggan Green, a small park with a memorial in memory of poet Eileen Duggan who was born and raised in the district. The memorial was unveiled on the 7 October 2009 by then-Deputy Mayor Jenny Andrews as part of Marlborough's 150th Anniversary Celebrations.

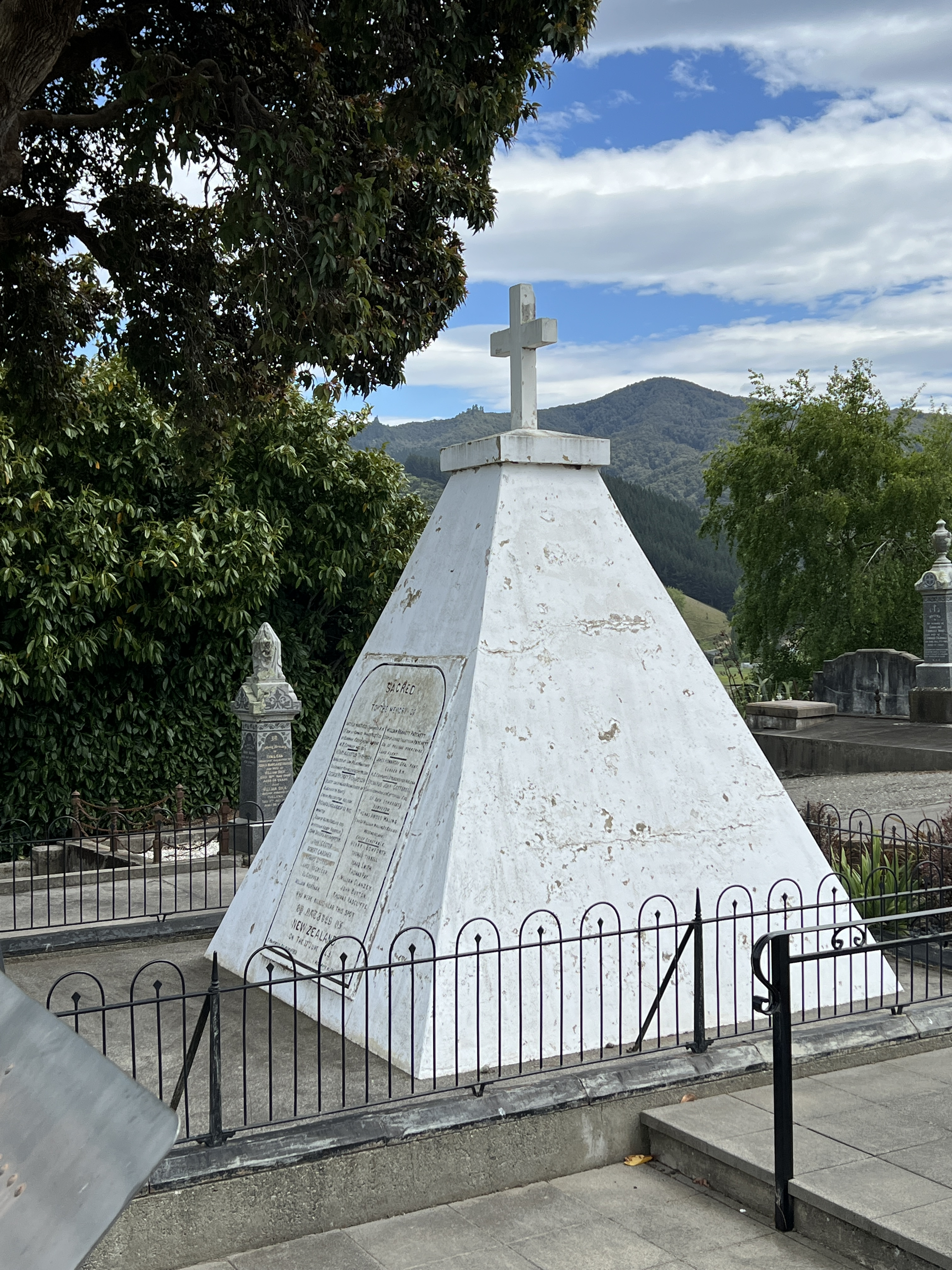
Wairau Affray Memorial

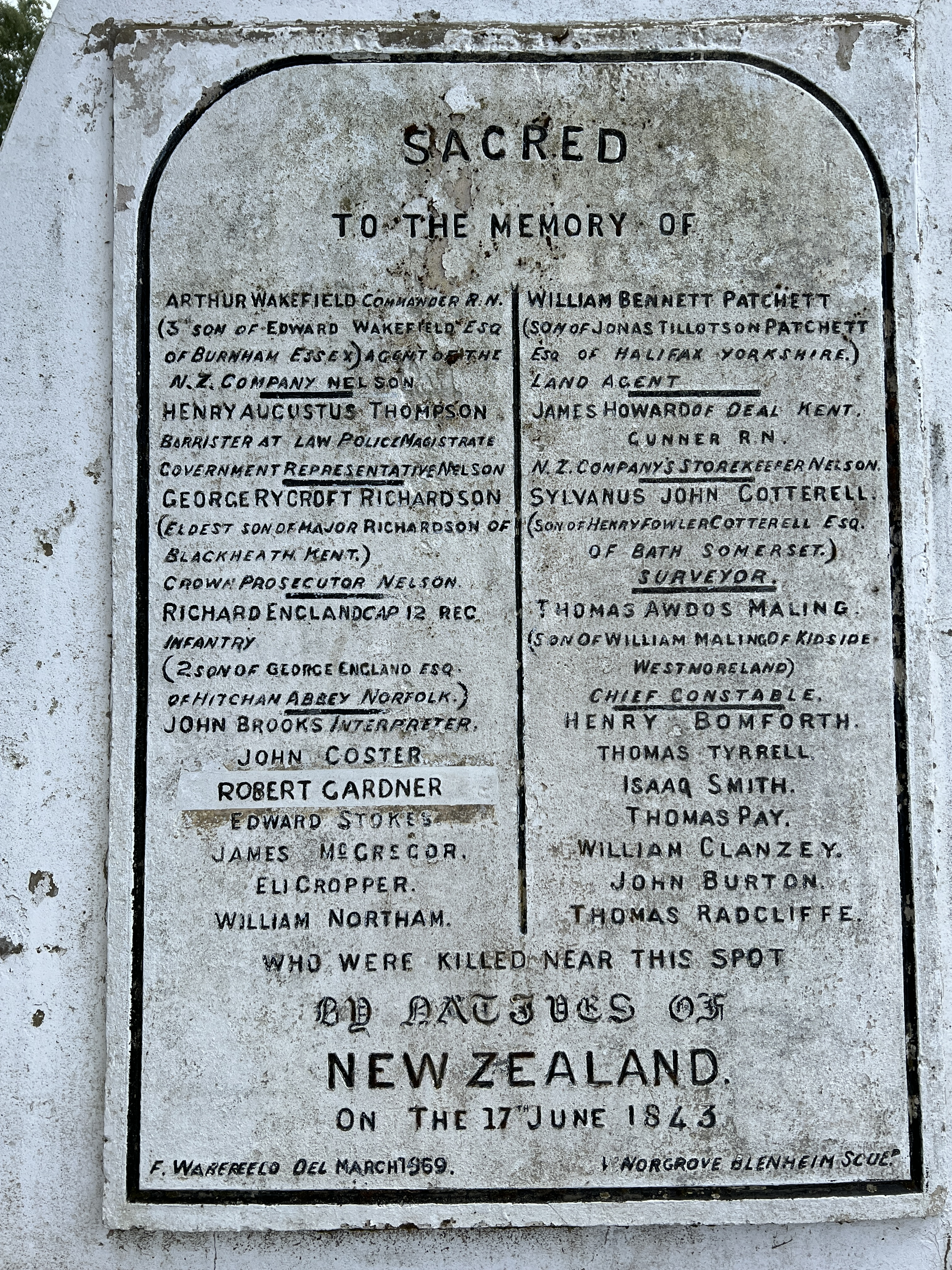
Wairau Affray plaque

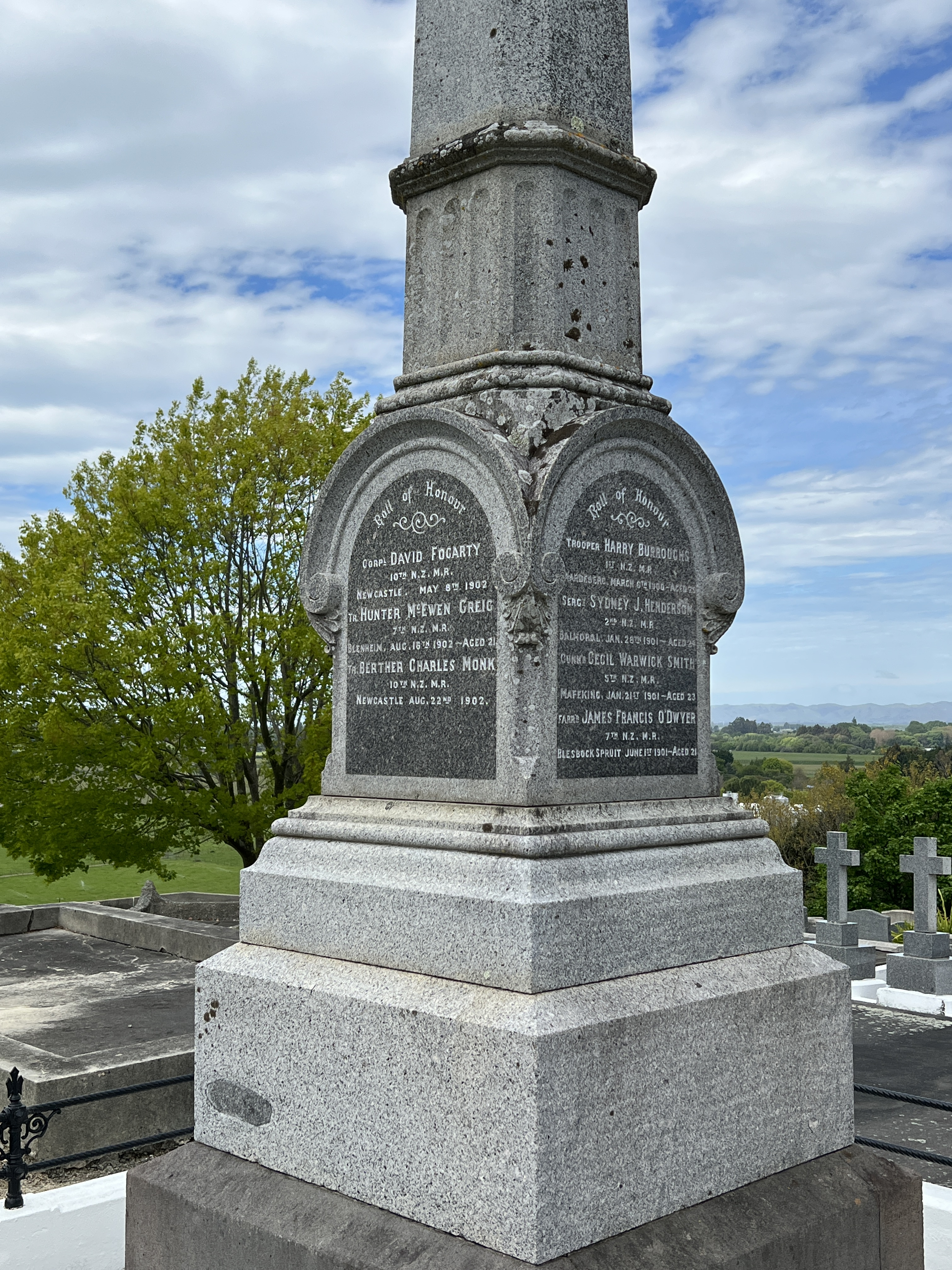
South African War Memorial

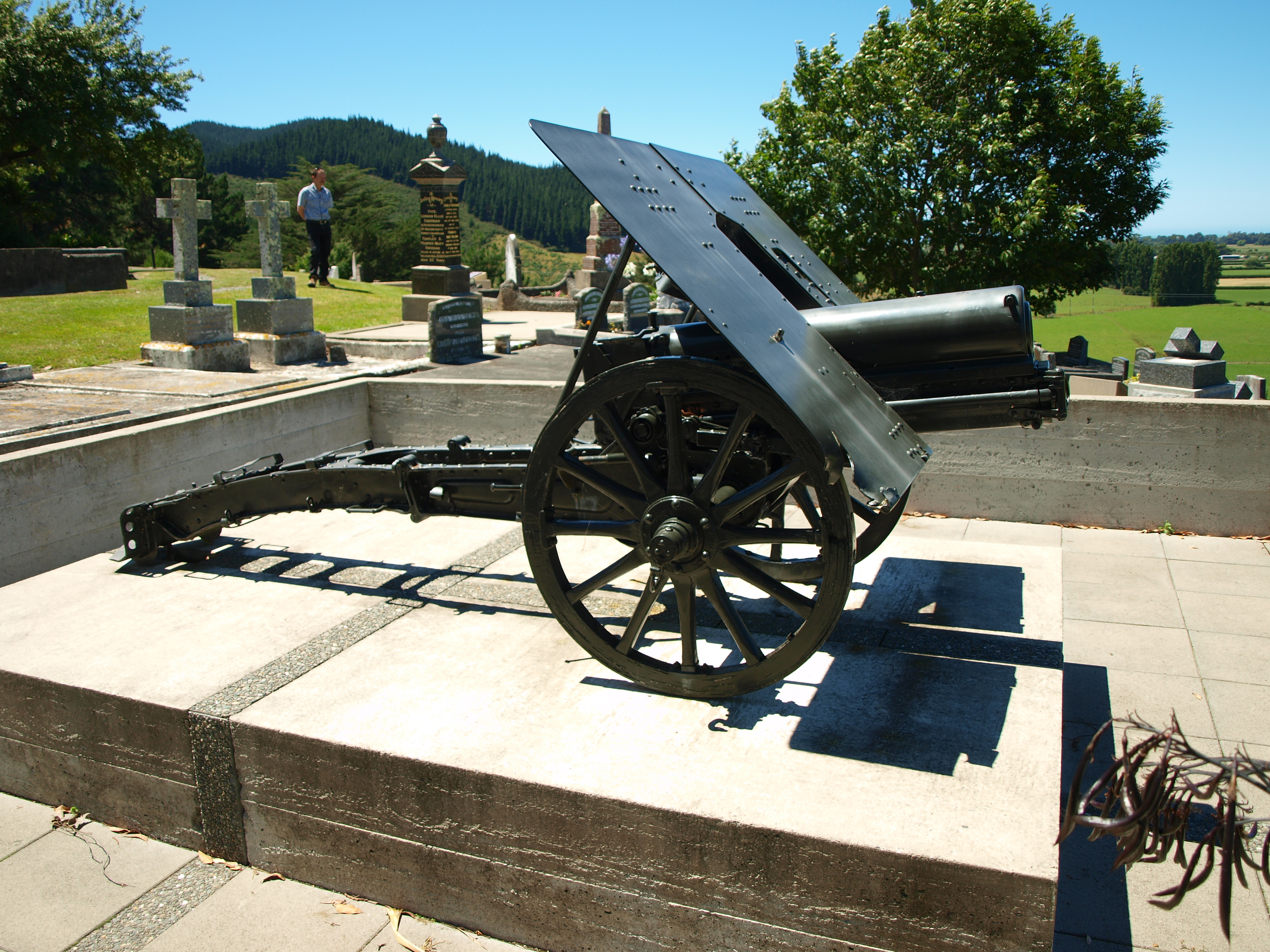
Skoda Howitzer

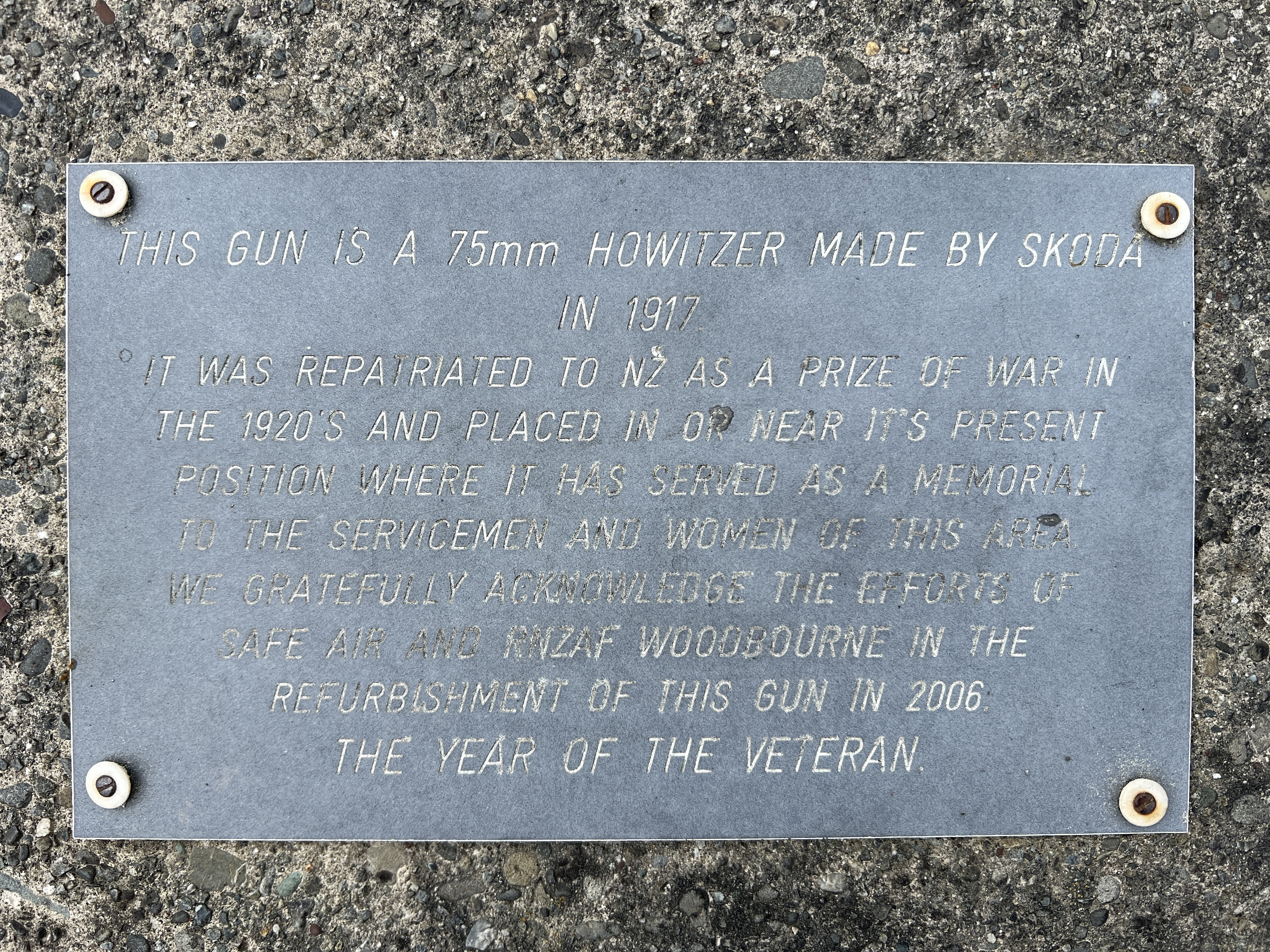
Plaque beside Howitzer

== Notable burials ==
- John Clervaux Chaytor (1836–1920), Farmer and businessman. Father of Sir Edward Walter Clervaux Chaytor.
- Arthur Wakefield (1799–1843), Royal Navy Captain and a New Zealand Company Official who was killed during the Wairau Affray.
