= Edward Wakefield (statistician) =

English philanthropist and statistician

Edward Wakefield (1774–1854) was an English philanthropist and statistician, chiefly known as the author of Ireland, Statistical and Political, and as the father of several notable if controversial sons.

== Early life ==
Edward was the eldest son of Edward Wakefield (1750–1826) and Priscilla Bell and was born in 1774. He was the brother of Daniel Wakefield (1776–1846) and Isabella Wakefield (3 Mar 1773–17 October 1841) who married Joshua Head of Ipswich on 12 Sep 1794.

== Career ==
Wakefield commenced adult life as a farmer near Romford in Essex, and was subsequently employed under the naval arsenal. In 1814 he established himself as a land agent at 42 Pall Mall. He soon became well known as an authority on agriculture, while his interest in education won for him the character of a practical philanthropist. He was a strong advocate of the educational theories of Joseph Lancaster, and was on terms of intimacy with James Mill and Francis Place.

== Author ==
Wakefield is best known as the author of Ireland, Statistical and Political, published in 1812, a work which, in spite of many inaccuracies, is, from the candour and tolerance it displays, a very valuable account of Ireland in the early years of the nineteenth century. The book was undertaken in 1808 at the suggestion of John Foster, 1st Baron Oriel, formerly chancellor of the Irish exchequer, and Wakefield devoted four years to the task. Mackintosh in the Edinburgh Review, while noting its defects in matters of detail, said of this work that "few books have stronger marks of the candour and probity of the writer;" and McCulloch called it "the best and most complete work on Ireland since Arthur Young's tour". Wakefield was a warm admirer of Pitt, by whom he is said to have been consulted in regard to Ireland, and was also confidentially employed by Lord Melville (see Robert Saunders Dundas).

== Family ==
Wakefield married, first, on 3 October 1791, Susanna Crash (d. 1816) of Felstead, Essex, by whom he was the father of ten children, including five particularly notable ones:

1. Catherine Gurney Wakefield (1793–1873) married the Rev Charles Martin Torlesse (1795–1881). Mother of Charles Obins Torlesse (1825–1866) and others.
2. Edward Gibbon Wakefield (1796–1862).
3. Daniel Bell Wakefield (1798–1858).
4. Arthur Wakefield (1799–1843).
5. William Hayward Wakefield (1801–1848).
6. John Howard Wakefield (1803–1862) married 12 January 1831 Maria Suffolk (1814–1852) and had issue.
7. Felix Wakefield (1807–1875).
8. Priscilla Susannah Wakefield (1809–1887) married Henry Howard Chapman (1797–1855) and had issue, including Sir Edward Francis Chapman (1840-1926) and the Rev Hugh Boswell Chapman (1853-1933).
9. Percy Wakefield (1810–1832).
10. Un-named Wakefield (1813).

He married his second wife, Frances, on 3 October 1823 in Paris, France. She was the daughter of David Davies, headmaster of Macclesfield grammar school.

== Death ==
Wakefield died at Knightsbridge on 18 May 1854. His appearance in later life is described as that of "a beautiful old man of lofty stature".
