= Elizabeth Henrietta =

Elizabeth Henrietta may refer to:

- Elizabeth Henrietta (1816 ship), a brig that was lost in 1825
- Elisabeth Henriette of Hesse-Kassel, the daughter of William VI, Landgrave of Hesse-Kassel and Hedwig Sophia of Brandenburg
- Elizabeth Henrietta, the wife of governor Lachlan Macquarie
- Elizabeth Henrietta Torlesse, New Zealand homemaker and community leader
