= William Wakefield =

Early New Zealand settler (1801–1848)

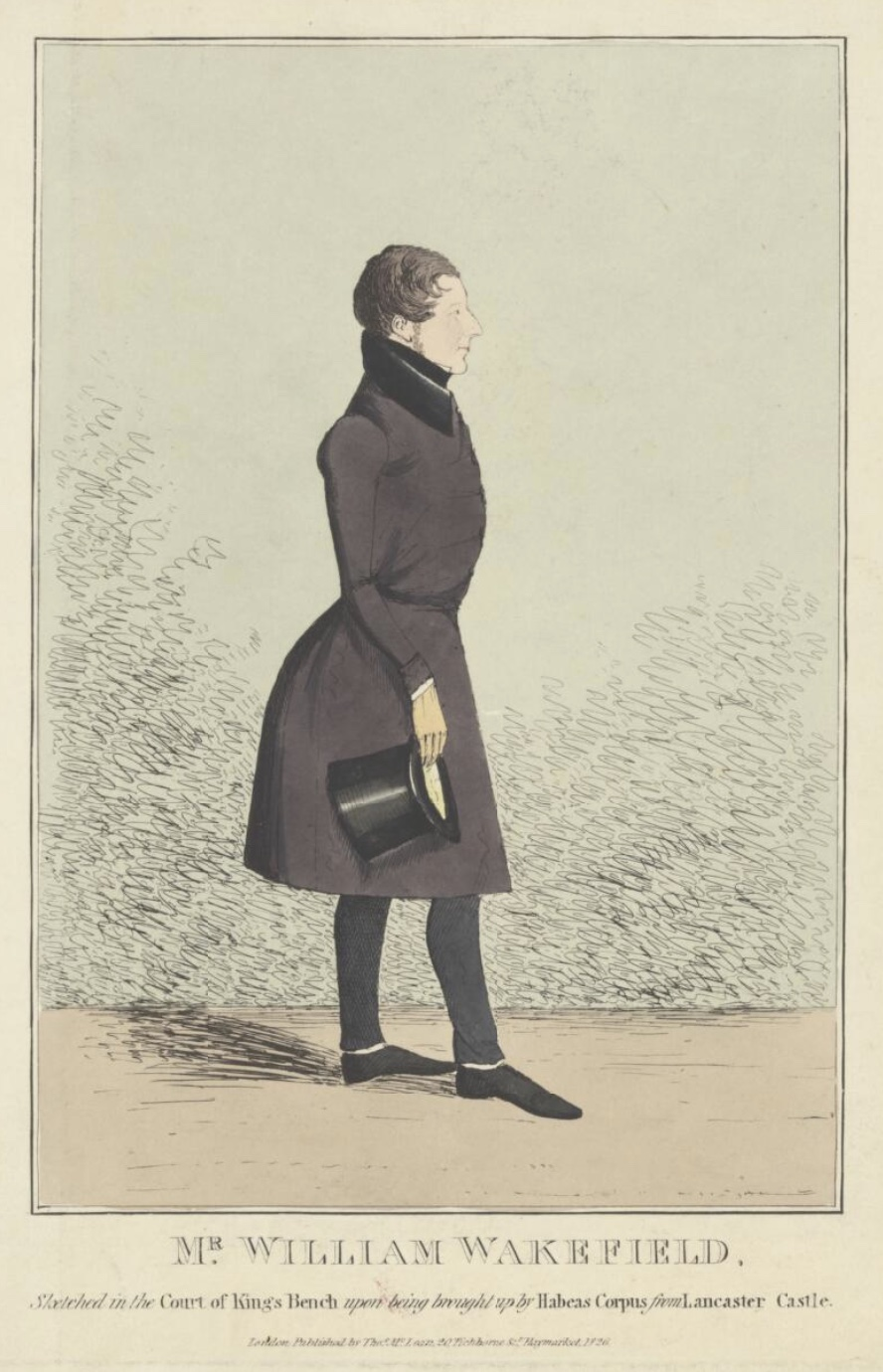
- Mr. William Wakefield sketched in the Court of Kings Bench in 1826
- Born: William Hayward Wakefield; 1801; London, United Kingdom
- Died: 19 September 1848 (aged 46–47); Wellington, New Zealand
- Spouse: Emily Sidney
- Relatives: Edward Wakefield (father); Susanna Wakefield (mother Priscilla Wakefield (grandmother); Catherine Wakefield (sister); E.G. Wakefield (brother); Arthur Wakefield (brother); Daniel Wakefield (brother); Felix Wakefield (brother); Jerningham Wakefield (nephew); Emily Wakefield (daughter)
- Military career
- Allegiance: Kingdom of Portugal; Empire of Brazil; Kingdom of Spain (Cristinos); United Kingdom
- Branch: Portuguese Loyalists; British Auxiliary Legion
- Service years: 1832–37
- Rank: Lieutenant Colonel
- Units: 1st Reina Isabel Lancer Regiment, 1836–37
- Commands: 1st Reina Isabel Lancer Regiment, 1836–37
- Conflicts: Liberal Wars (Portuguese Civil War) • Siege of Porto; First Carlist War • Battle of Ayete, 1836; Wairau Affray
- Awards: Lieutenant-Governor of New Zealand, 1840
- Memorials: William Wakefield Memorial, Wellington
- Other work: Principal Agent, New Zealand Company, 1839–48

Colonel William Hayward Wakefield (1801 – 19 September 1848) was an English officer of the British Auxiliary Legion, and the leader of the second New Zealand Company's first colonising expedition to New Zealand; one of the founders of Wellington city. As a leader, he attracted much controversy.

== Early life ==
William Wakefield was born just outside London in 1801, the son of Edward Wakefield (1774–1854), a distinguished surveyor and land agent, and Susanna Crush (1767–1816). His grandmother, Priscilla Wakefield (1751–1832), was a popular children's author and helped to establish savings banks.

Wakefield's siblings were Catherine Gurney Wakefield (1793–1873), the mother of Charles Torlesse (1825–1866); Edward Gibbon Wakefield (1796–1862); Daniel Wakefield (1798–1858); Arthur Wakefield (1799–1843); John Howard Wakefield (1803–1862); Felix Wakefield (1807–1875); Priscilla Susannah Wakefield (1809–1887); Percy Wakefield (1810–1832); and an unnamed child born in 1813.

Wakefield was largely raised by his elder sister, Catherine, who found him a difficult child. As he grew older he came under the influence of his elder brother, Edward Gibbon Wakefield, who was later to establish the New Zealand Company.

== Imprisonment ==
In 1825, Wakefield became formally betrothed to Emily Sidney, but before they could be married he became involved with his elder brother Edward in the abduction of a wealthy heiress and both brothers were arrested. While out on bail, Wakefield absconded to Paris, apparently to meet with Emily who was three months pregnant. He returned to England when the baby was born and was promptly arrested and held in Lancaster Castle until his trial, and subsequently sentenced to three years in jail. During this time, Emily Sidney died, leaving him with a daughter also named Emily.

== Military service ==
Upon his release from jail, Wakefield spent some time with his daughter and his sister Catherine. In 1832 he travelled to Portugal and enlisted as a mercenary soldier in the service of Dom Pedro, the Emperor of Brazil. Although he had no military experience, Wakefield was apparently able to enlist as a Captain. He survived the Siege of Porto and the subsequent campaigning, and earned several medals.

After his time in Portugal, Wakefield returned briefly to England and enlisted in the British Auxiliary Legion (BAL) fighting for the infant Queen Isabella II of Spain in the First Carlist War. He emerged from the campaign with the rank of major, re-enlisted, and was promoted to lieutenant colonel. Among his junior officers was Henry Inman. Wakefield was one of the few officers to survive the campaign; he stayed until the Legion was disbanded in 1837 and returned to England the following year. Regarding the 1st Reina Isabel Lancers, BAL, Alexander Somerville noted:

They were commanded by Colonel Wakefield, an officer who was strict in discipline, though not so tyrannical as Colonel Kinloch, their former commanding officer, but every whit as brave and efficient before the enemy. Kinloch was a tyrant, but at the same time a clever officer, and hero in courage. He was the son of the late M. P. for Dundee. Wakefield, on the other hand, was as clever, less tyrannical, and distinguished, nay, almost reckless in courage."

== The Tory expedition ==
In early 1839, the New Zealand Company in London was hurriedly organising its first expedition, eager to take advantage of the still uncertain governance situation in New Zealand. The Company's aim was to establish a model of English society in New Zealand by selling land to settlers at a profit and using the funds to pay for settlers' travel to New Zealand, encouraging immigration. In reality, the Company was more like a real estate agency, promising generous returns to its investors.

At the suggestion of his brother, Edward Gibbon, the New Zealand Company appointed Wakefield as commander of this first expedition. The Tory sailed from Plymouth on 12 May 1839, with Wakefield as sole and unqualified leader of the expedition. He was given set of instructions for the expedition's activities: to purchase land for the New Zealand Company, to gather knowledge about New Zealand, and to prepare for building settlements. Wakefield was expected to treat the Māori with the utmost fairness.

Wakefield's first sight of New Zealand's formidable mountain ranges was not encouraging. The expedition took on supplies of wood and water at Ship Cove in Queen Charlotte Sound and met their first Māori, who were interested in trading.

After five weeks in the Marlborough Sounds in the South Island, the Tory sailed across Cook Strait to Te Whanganui-a-Tara ("The Big Harbour of Tara") and Port Nicholson. Here he began serious negotiations for purchasing land. The negotiations involved two iwi (tribes), Ngāti Toa and Te Atiawa, and sixteen chiefs. After five days a deal was made that was subsequently endorsed by the paramount chief of the area, Te Rauparaha. Strong objections were raised by Te Rauparaha's nephew, Te Rangihaeata.

The purchase completed, Wakefield and the Tory set out to explore a more of New Zealand, sailing up the west coast. The expedition were impressed with the potential of the Taranaki area for further settlement. They then sailed up to the Hokianga, made contact with traders, and looked at buying land in that district. However, the expedition was cut short when the Tory ran aground in Hokianga Harbour. The ship was saved but it needed extensive repairs.

== Wellington settlement ==
Wakefield returned to Te Whanganui-a-Tara in early January 1840. The first British settlers’ ships arrived in Port Nicholson in January, encouraged by the New Zealand Company's advertisements promoting immigration. However, it became clear that the land around Petone was not suitable for settlement, being too swampy. A new site had to be selected and Lambton Harbour was chosen, a few kilometres further west.

This site was already occupied by Māori, being one of their residential areas. Wakefield had bought and paid for the land on behalf of the New Zealand Company, but soon realised that Māori had had a different understanding of the deal; they had expected to share the land with Pākeha (non-Māori), and were unwilling to move.

When the missionary Henry Williams appeared in the district with copies of the Treaty of Waitangi for Māori to sign, he also claimed some of the land the New Zealand Company had purchased. Wakefield granted him one acre (4,000 m²) of town land, but Williams was later to lose his role as a missionary for defrauding Māori.

Wakefield believed that Port Nicholson's central position made it the obvious choice to be New Zealand's capital and seat of government. However, Governor William Hobson chose Auckland, possibly feeling that Port Nicholson was dominated by the New Zealand Company. When the General Legislative Council was formed in May 1841, Hobson appointed Wakefield as one of its members. Wakefield's membership terminated only a few months later.

In 1842, Wakefield was joined in New Zealand by his daughter Emily, then sixteen years old. Shortly afterwards she became engaged to Francis Molesworth, but the engagement was broken off when an injury forced Molesworth to return to England. In late 1845, Emily met Edward Stafford of Nelson and they were married the following year.

=== Criticism of land deals ===
The secretive and rushed way that the New Zealand Company had begun settlement ahead of the signing of the Treaty of Waitangi created problems for Wakefield. Governor William Hobson resented the New Zealand Company, seeing the Settlers' Council as an attempt to establish an illegal republic. The Acting Colonial Secretary Willoughby Shortland was dispatched with soldiers and mounted police to disband the council.

Several land deals were renegotiated, as many settlers were either not happy with the land they had been allocated or hadn't received what they had paid for. To satisfy its commitments, the New Zealand Company needed about 500 square kilometres of land, which was difficult considering the terrain in the Wellington area and the fact that the Company had limited resources.

Over the next few years, Wakefield was involved in disputes with the Crown, with Māori, and with his own surveyors, meaning that land deals were delayed by months or years. The New Zealand Company had guaranteed work for labourers that emigrated to New Zealand, but delays over land deals led to a lack of work, causing further anger. At one stage, the town of Nelson was almost in a state of armed rebellion against the Company’s agents.

In 2003, the Waitangi Tribunal investigated the New Zealand Company's 1839 Port Nicholson deed of purchase and declared it invalid. The tribunal found that Māori were never paid for some 120,000 acres (49,000 ha), the boundaries weren't clear, not all those with customary rights signed the deed, and those who did sign didn't understand it, as it was in English and Richard Barrett's translation missed or confused several important facts.

== Personal troubles ==
The unruly behaviour of Wakefield's nephew, Jerningham, caused concern for Wakefield. Wakefield was also affected by the death of his brother Arthur in the Wairau Affray, and felt partly responsible. This led Wakefield to clash with Governor Robert FitzRoy when FitzRoy declined to take action against Arthur's killers.

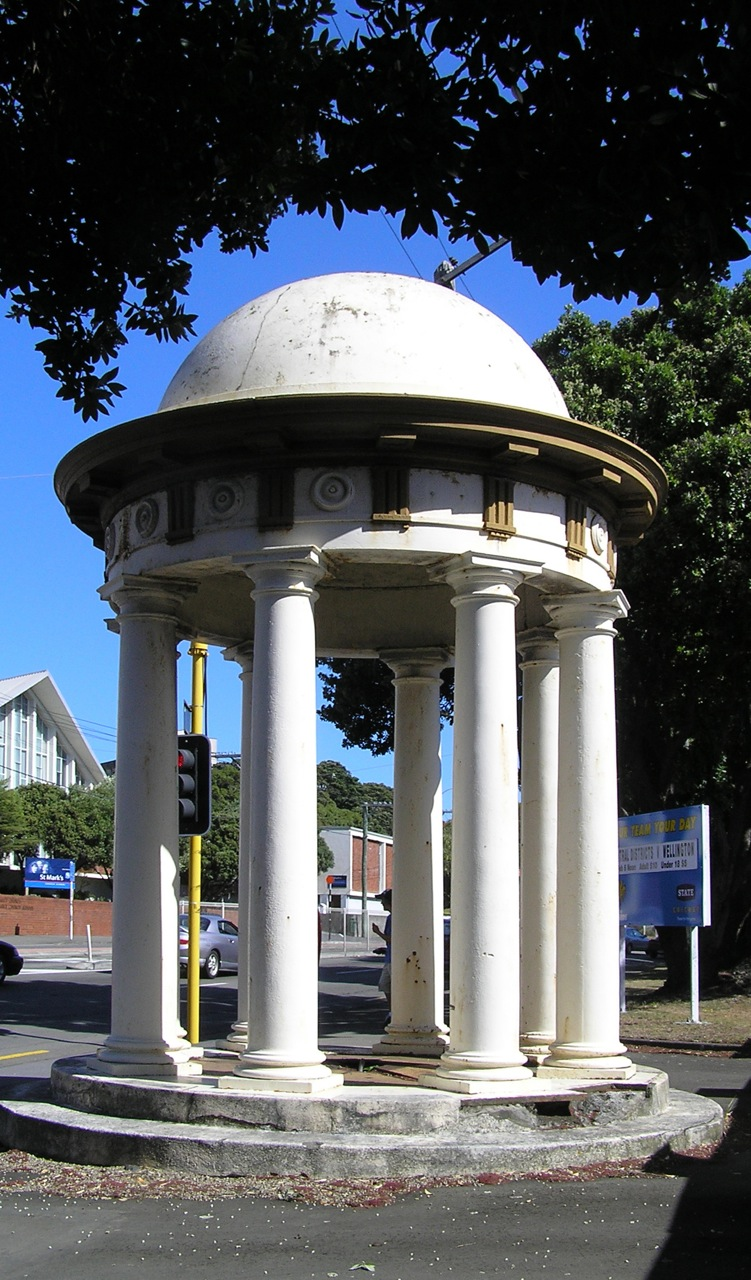
The William Wakefield Memorial in the Basin Reserve cricket ground in Wellington, New Zealand.

The New Zealand Company's issues were made worse by Wakefield's personality; he demonstrated no leadership qualities and was unwilling to take initiative in dealing with problems, alienating many settlers. One settler wrote that "the baneful influence of Colonel Wakefield has ruined every settler and the colony of Port Nicholson." Another described Wakefield as "the coldest mannered man they have met".

In March 1847, Wakefield fought a duel with his doctor, Isaac Featherston, over an editorial in the Wellington Independent newspaper that questioned his honesty. Featherstone fired first and missed, then Wakefield fired into the air, stating "I would not shoot a man who has seven daughters".

== Death ==
On 15 September 1848, Wakefield collapsed at a bath house following two strokes earlier that year, and he died four days later in a room at the Wellington Hotel. He was given what amounted to a state funeral. Governor George Grey attended as did nearly half of Wellington, both Māori and Pākeha. Māori chief Hōniana Te Puni-kōkopu was one of the pallbearers.

Soon after his death, Wakefield's friends began to fundraise for a memorial, but it was not until 1882 that the William Wakefield Memorial was unveiled at Wellington's Basin Reserve. The memorial is registered as a Category I heritage structure by the Heritage New Zealand.
