= Škoda 75 mm Model 15 =

WWI Austro-Hungarian mountain gun

7.5 cm Gebirgskanone M. 15
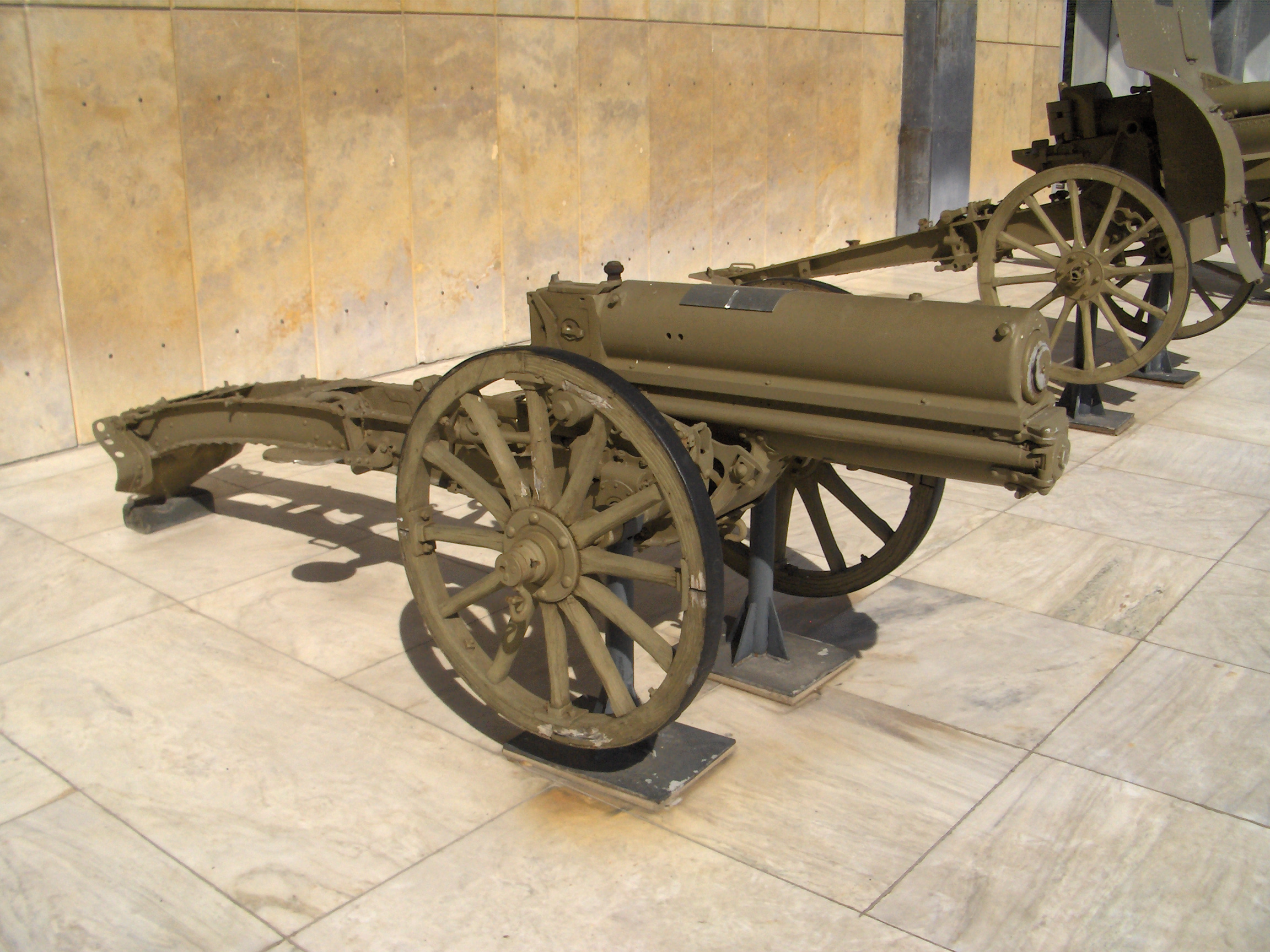
- Type: Mountain gun
- Place of origin: Austria-Hungary

Service history
- In service: 1915–1945
- Used by: See users
- Wars: World War I World War II

Production history
- Designer: Škoda
- Designed: 1911–1914
- Manufacturer: Škoda
- Variants: See variants

Specifications
- Mass: 613 kg (1,351 lb)
- Barrel length: 1.15 m (3 ft 9 in) L/15.4
- Crew: 6
- Shell: Fixed QF 75 x 129 mm R
- Shell weight: 6.35 kg (14 lb 0 oz)
- Caliber: 75 mm (3.0 in)
- Breech: horizontal semi-automatic sliding-wedge
- Recoil: Hydro-pneumatic
- Carriage: Box trail
- Elevation: -10° to +50°
- Traverse: 7°
- Rate of fire: 6-8 rpm
- Muzzle velocity: 349 m/s (1,150 ft/s)
- Maximum firing range: 8,250 m (9,020 yd)

The Škoda 7.5 cm Gebirgskanone M. 15 (Czech: 7,5cm horský kanón M 15; Bulgarian: 75-мм планинско оръдие "Шкода") was a mountain gun used by Austria-Hungary in World War I. In German service, it was known as the 7,5cm Škoda Geb. K. M. 15. The Italians designated them as the Obice da 75/13 and the Wehrmacht would designate captured guns as 7.5 cm GebK 259(i) after the surrender of Italy in 1943.

== Description ==
The M15 is described by Gander and Cappellano as a howitzer, capable of delivering high-trajectory fire, which made it useful for mountain warfare. It was also lightweight, weighing 613 kg (1,351 lb) and could be broken down for transport into seven loads, the heaviest one weighing over 150 kg (330 lb); while the disassembled gun could be manhandled, the Germans during WWII made use of teams of mules instead. A folding gun shield could also be fitted.

The gun could fire a 6.35 kg (14.0 lb) shell up to 8,250 m (9,020 yd) despite the short barrel. Ammunition types included high-explosive (HE), shrapnel, HE Shrapnel, and reportedly gas shells. According to Cappellano, the Škoda M15 proved to be superior over the lighter Cannone da 65/17 modello 13 used by the Italians.

== History ==
Its development was quite prolonged, as the Austrians couldn't decide on the specifications that they wanted. Initially, they wanted a gun that could be broken down into no more than five pack-animal loads to replace the various 7 cm mountain guns in service, but prolonged trials proved that the 7.5 cm M. 12 prototype to be the best gun. However, the commander-in-chief of Bosnia and Herzegovina believed it to be too heavy and demanded a return to the 7 cm caliber to save weight. Škoda dutifully built enough guns for a test battery in the smaller caliber and tested them during the spring of 1914 where they were judged inferior to the 7.5 cm guns. This cost the Austrians heavily as the 7.5 cm guns began to be delivered in April 1915 instead of the planned date of April 1914.

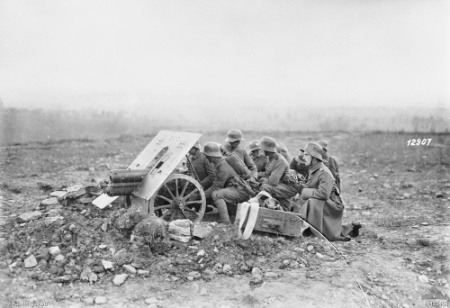
German anti-tank gunners and supporting infantry, October 1918

A standard Austro-Hungarian Gebirgs-Artillerie-Regimenter, which was used to beef up Field Artillery Regiments in some Corps, would be equipped with 36 Škoda M15s on paper, though in reality the number of guns and batteries varied quite a bit. Part of this reason was due to the slow production and dispersement of the guns and parts. 76 artillery pieces were delivered in the first half of 1915, with 250-252 barreled assemblies & 248 carriages delivered in the second half of that same year. The German Army used the Škoda as a substitute for the 7.62 cm Infanteriegeschütz L/16.5 in the infantry support role with 14 Infanteriegeschütz-battalions equipped with these guns but using more powerful HE grenades than those used by the Austro-Hungarians. While the Austro-Hungarians were generally well pleased with the Škoda, the Germans tended to use the gun in situations it wasn't designed for such as a mobile close support weapon. The M15 was designed to be disassembled for transport but the Germans often towed them on long marches as-is, so that the main parts had a tendency to become lose or disconnected after traveling on bumpy terrain. This was mainly because there wasn't a large need for disassembly on the Western Front as there were in other areas such as the Italian Front.

== Variants ==
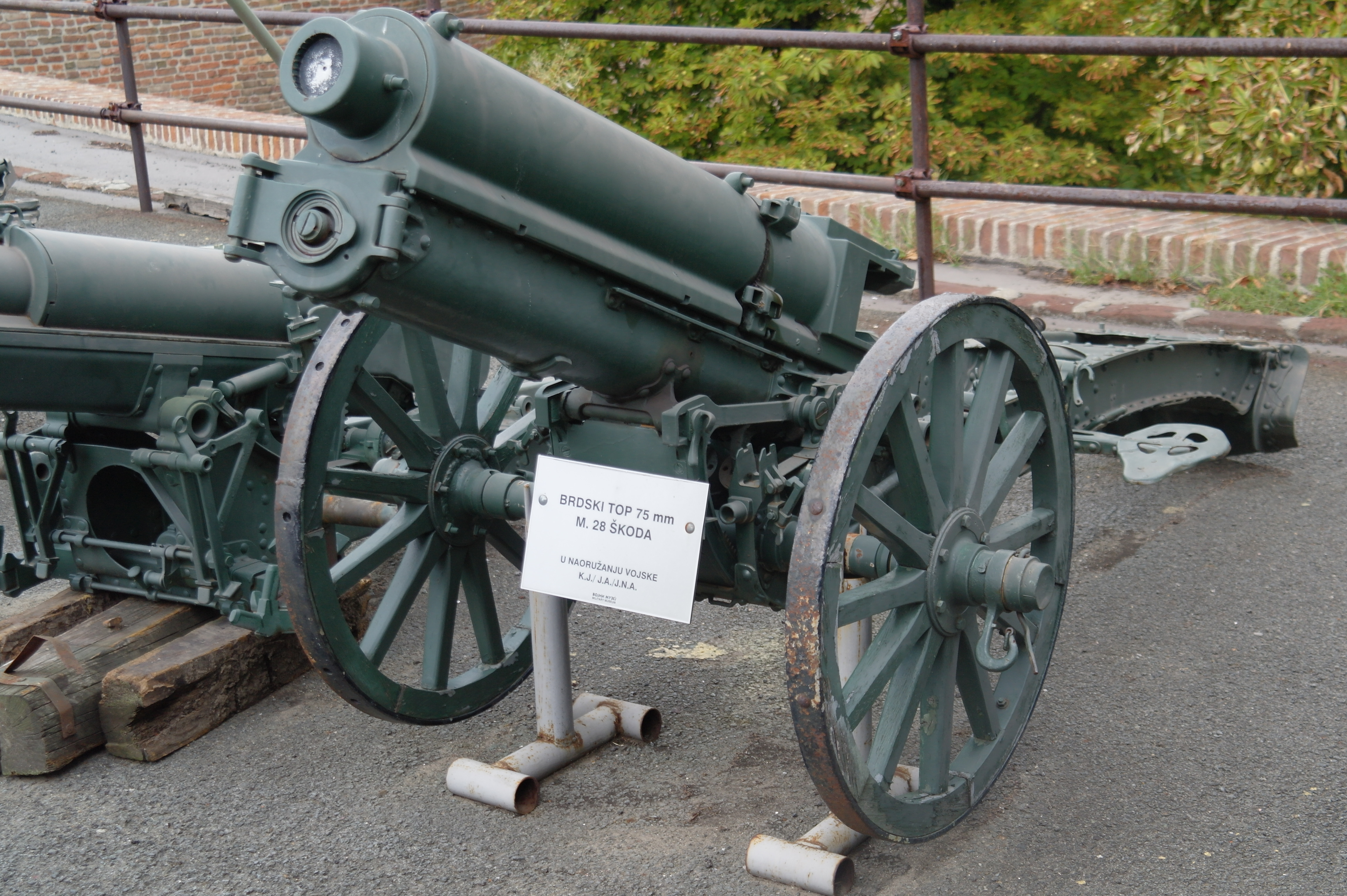
A M28 gun on display at the Belgrade Military Museum

- Škoda 75 mm Model 15 − Original model
- Škoda 75 mm Model 1928 − Improved export model for Yugoslavia, it could be fitted with either a 75 mm (3.0 in) or 90 mm (3.5 in) barrel, but only the former saw any use. During WWII, the Germans gave the captured guns the designations 7.5 cm GebK 28 (in Einheitslafette mit 9 cm GebH) and 7.5 cm GebK 285(j) and passed them to the Independent State of Croatia. Colombia also purchased some M28s and after the war replaced them with surplus M116 howitzers

== Users ==
- Austria-Hungary
- Austria
- Bulgaria
- Colombia − M28, replaced by the M116 howitzer
- Croatia
- Czechoslovakia
- German Empire
- Nazi Germany − Designated as 7.5 cm GebK 15
- Hungary
- Italy − Designated as Obice da 75/13 (Designated as Obice da 75/15 P.B for the Model 1928)
- Poland
- Romania
- Slovakia
- Turkey
- Yugoslavia − M15 and M28

== Surviving examples ==
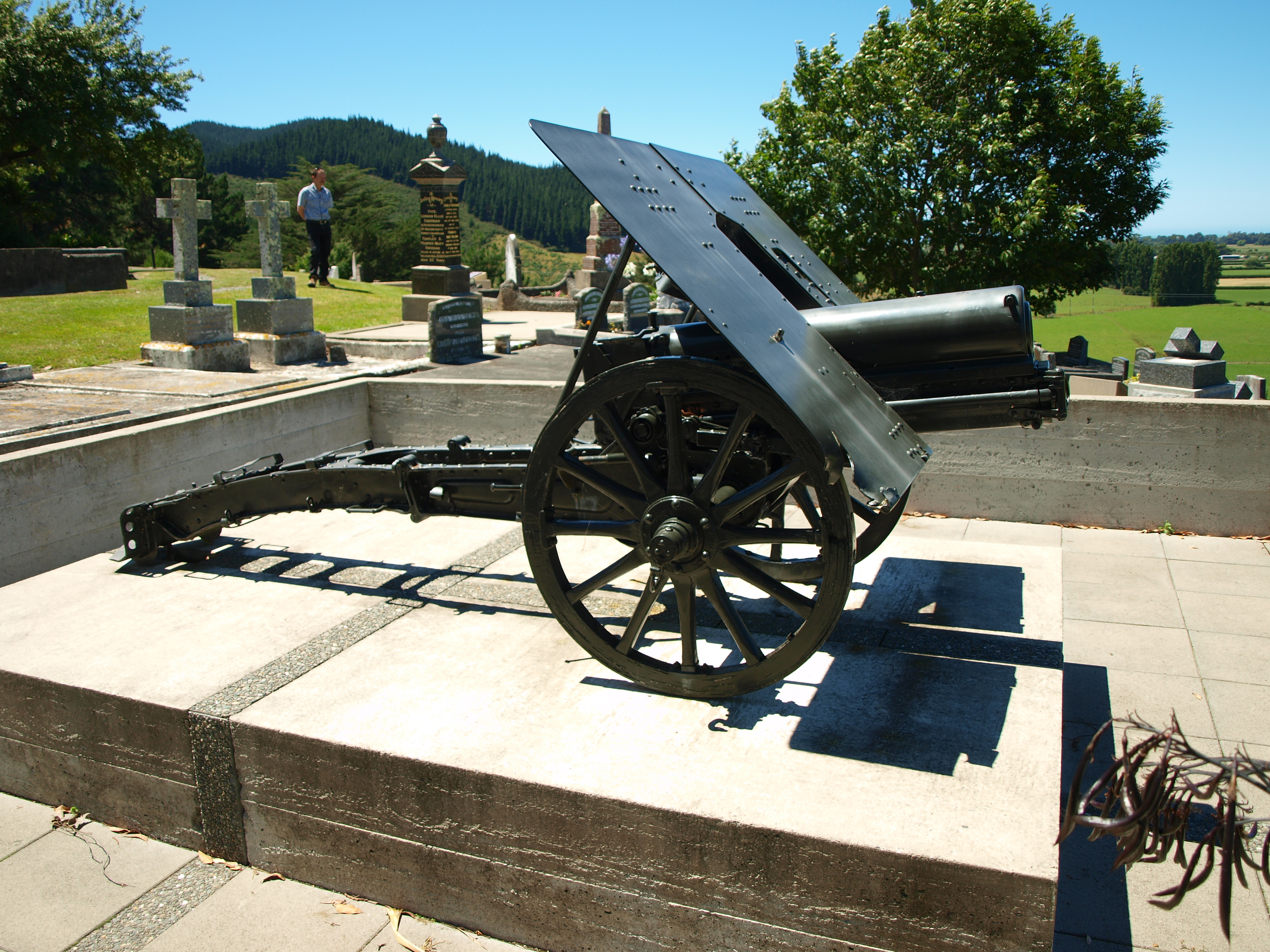
War memorial in Tuamarina Cemetery, New Zealand

Serial number 1399 (manufactured 1917) is displayed in Bundaberg, Queensland, having been gifted to that city as a war trophy, in 1921, by the Australian Government.

Another, also repatriated in the 1920s, serves as a memorial to the men and women of the armed forces in Tuamarina Cemetery, Marlborough, New Zealand.

== Bibliography ==
- Cappelano, Filippo (2016). "Italian Artillery during the First World War: Its structural, Organic, Tactical and Material Evolution". In Marble, Sanders (ed.). King of Battle: Artillery in World War I. Vol. 108. Boston, Massachusetts: Brill. pp. 196−220. ISBN 978-90-04-30728-5.
- Chamberlain, Peter; Gander, Terry (1975). Infantry, Mountain, and Airborne Guns. New York: Arco Publishing Company. ISBN 978-0-668-03819-5.
- Englemann, Joachim and Scheibert, Horst. Deutsche Artillerie 1934-1945: Eine Dokumentation in Text, Skizzen und Bildern: Ausrüstung, Gliderung, Ausbildung, Führung, Einsatz. Limburg/Lahn, Germany: C. A. Starke, 1974
- English, Adrian J. (1984). Armed forces of Latin America : their histories, development, present strength, and military potential. London: Jane's Publishing Inc. ISBN 978-0-7106-0321-0.
- Gander, Terry and Chamberlain, Peter. Weapons of the Third Reich: An Encyclopedic Survey of All Small Arms, Artillery and Special Weapons of the German Land Forces 1939-1945. New York: Doubleday, 1979 ISBN 0-385-15090-3
- Gander, Terry (1998). Germany's guns, 1939−1945. Marlborough, Massachusetts: Crowood Press. ISBN 978-1-86126-110-6.
- Hogg, Ian. Twentieth-Century Artillery. New York: Barnes & Noble Books, 2000 ISBN 0-7607-1994-2
- Jäger, Herbert. German Artillery of World War One. Ramsbury, Marlborough, Wiltshire: Crowood Press, 2001 ISBN 1-86126-403-8
- Ortner, M. Christian. The Austro-Hungarian Artillery From 1867 to 1918: Technology, Organization, and Tactics. Vienna, Verlag Militaria, 2007 ISBN 978-3-902526-13-7
