= Frederick Tuckett =

New Zealand Company agent (27 August 1807 – 16 April 1876)

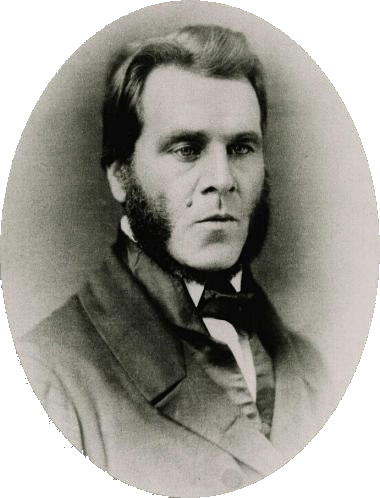
- Born: 27 August 1807; Bristol
- Occupation: Surveyor
- Employer: New Zealand Company

Frederick Tuckett (27 August 1807 – 16 April 1876) was a New Zealand surveyor, explorer and New Zealand Company agent. He was born in Frenchay, Gloucestershire, England, in August 27, 1807. He was the fifth and youngest son of Phillip Debell Tuckett, a woollen manufacturer, and Elizabeth Curtis. His parents were members of the Society of Friends and Frederick was educated at a Quaker school before being apprenticed to a tanner in 1824. In 1829, he went to the United States. Upon his return to England in 1831, he studied civil engineering and was then employed in railway construction.

In April 1841, Tuckett was engaged by the New Zealand Company as principal civil engineer and surveyor to the intended settlement of Nelson. He sailed for New Zealand on the Will Watch with the advance party, reaching Wellington on September 8, 1841. After discussions with the governor, William Hobson, the party proceeded to Blind Bay, anchoring in the Astrolabe Roadstead on October 9, 1941. Tuckett was almost immediately at dispute with Captain Arthur Wakefield, the settlement's leader, over the suitability of the land. Although it was apparent that there was insufficient arable land at the site selected, Whakatu, the survey of Nelson went ahead.
