= Charles Torlesse =

New Zealand surveyor (1825–1866)

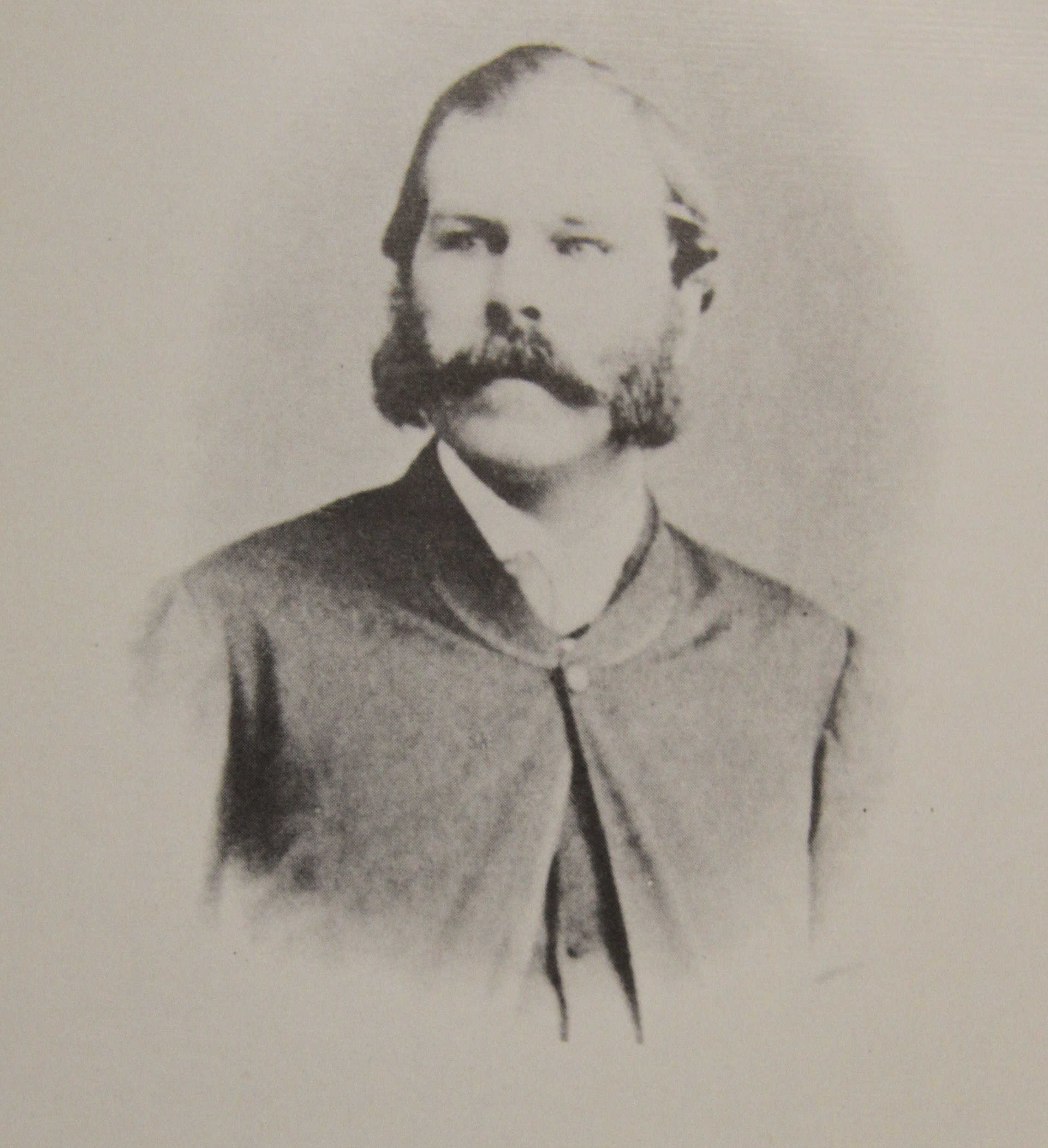
- Charles Torlesse (year unknown)
- Born: 2 May 1825; Stoke-by-Nayland, Suffolk, England
- Died: 14 November 1866 (aged 41); Stoke-by-Nayland
- Resting place: Stoke-by-Nayland
- Occupations: Surveyor, farmer
- Known for: Surveyor for the New Zealand Company and Canterbury Association
- Spouse: Alicia Torlesse (née Townsend)
- Parent(s): Rev Charles Martin Torlesse; Catherine Torlesse (née Wakefield)
- Relatives: Edward Gibbon Wakefield (uncle); Arthur Wakefield (uncle); Felix Wakefield (uncle); William Wakefield (uncle); Jerningham Wakefield (cousin); Elizabeth Torlesse (sister-in-law)

Charles Obins Torlesse (2 May 1825 – 14 November 1866) was a prominent surveyor for the Canterbury Association in Canterbury, New Zealand.

== Biography ==
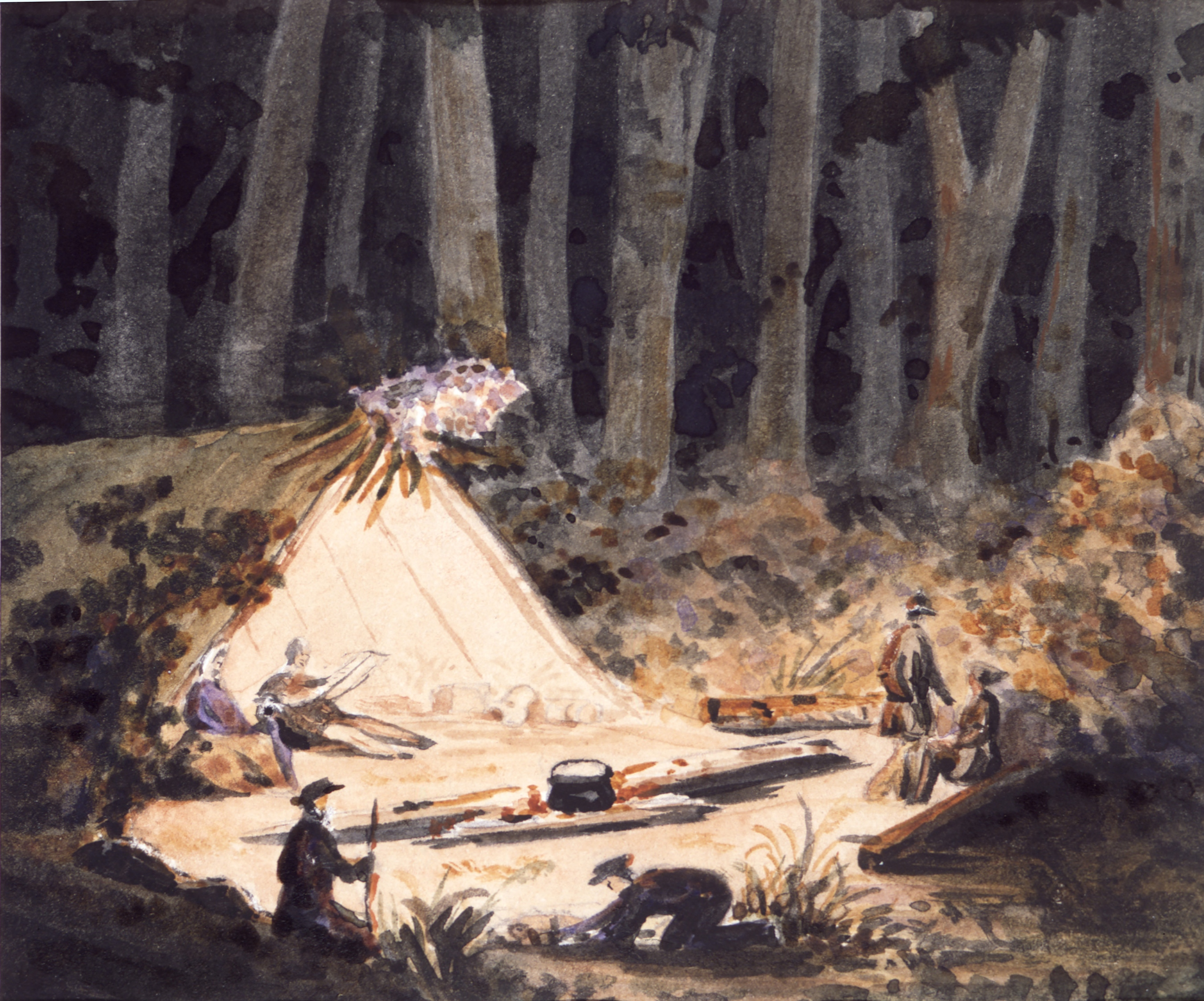
Night-time camping scene at Rangiora bush with John Robert Godley, Charlotte Godley, Arthur Godley, Charles Torlesse, Charles Hunter Brown, and Jerningham Wakefield. Painted on 6 December 1850 by Frederick Weld.

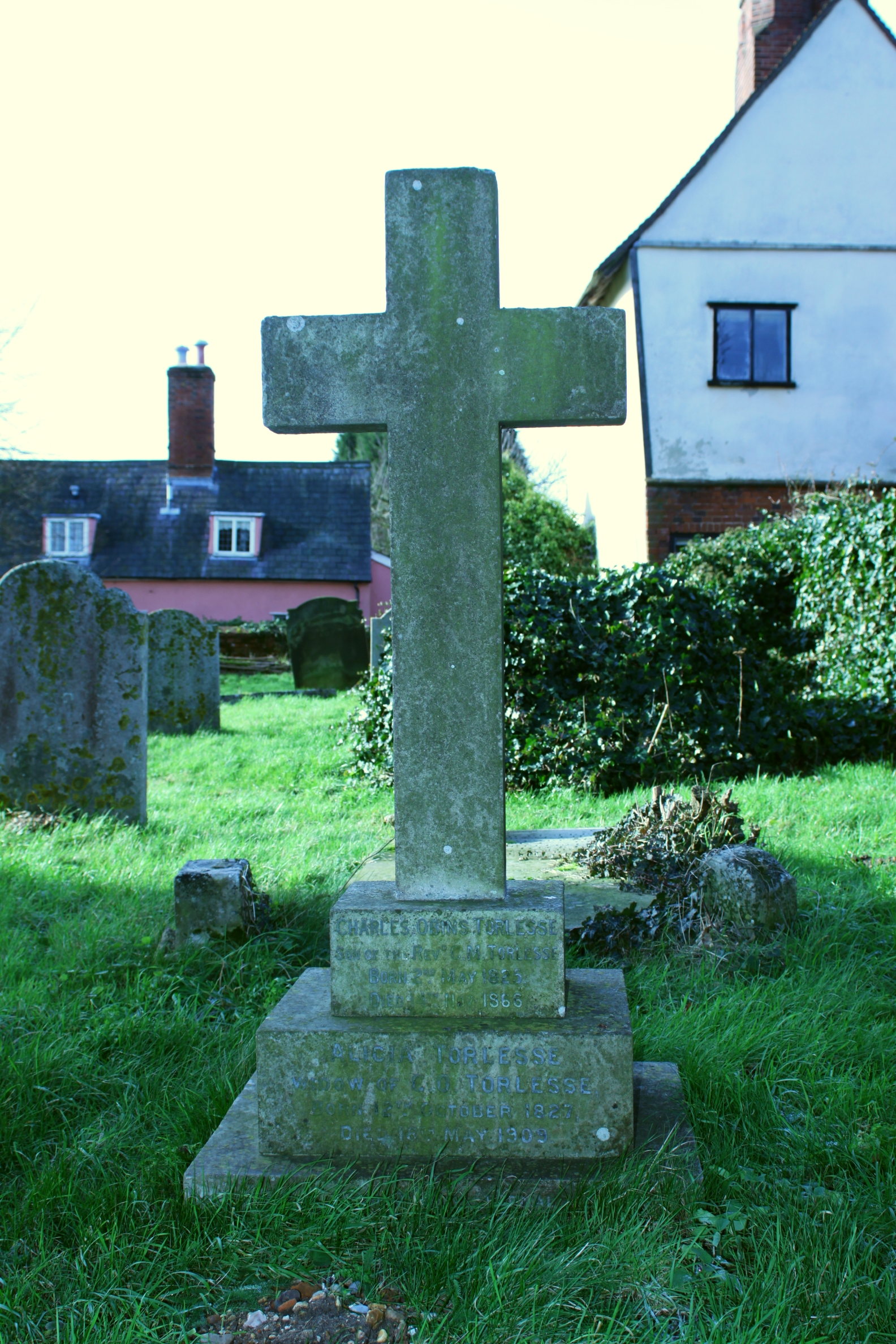
Headstone of Charles Torlesse

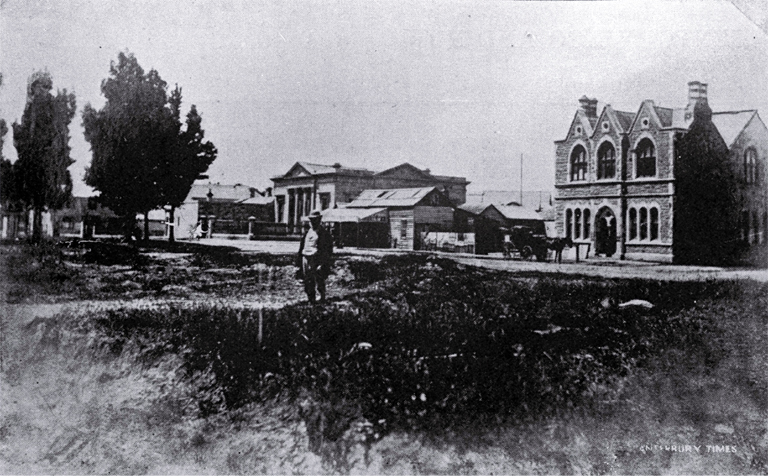
The Torlesse Building (right) in Cathedral Square in 1866

Torlesse was born in Stoke-by-Nayland, Suffolk, England, in 1825. He was the eldest son of the Rev Charles Martin Torlesse, who was on the management committee of the Canterbury Association. His mother Catherine Torlesse was the sister of Edward Gibbon Wakefield.

Aged 16, Torlesse started a survey cadetship under his uncle Arthur Wakefield for the New Zealand Company in Nelson. He stayed in Nelson from 1841 and returned to England in 1843, after his uncle was killed in the Wairau Affray.

Torlesse together with fellow surveyor Thomas Cass returned to New Zealand by the Bernica, and arrived in December 1848, to work under chief surveyor, Captain Joseph Thomas. In 1849 he was joined by survey assistant, John Cowell Boys, who had also been a part of the Nelson party in 1841. The pair worked closely together and formed a friendship, and when Torlesse took up land in Rangiora where he built the area's first house, Boys also set to reside in the area.

On 27 December 1851, Torlesse married Alicia Townsend in Christchurch. She was the third daughter of James Townsend, who brought his family out to the colony on the Cressy. Alicia's sister, Priscilla, married Boys shortly after in 1852. His brother Henry Torlesse came to New Zealand in early 1853 on the Minerva and married Elizabeth Revell, a fellow passenger on that journey. The Torlesse brothers farmed together in Rangiora.

Torlesse held town section (TS) 732 in trust for Felix Wakefield, a brother of Edward Gibbon Wakefield. The section fronted onto both Cathedral Square and Hereford Street. From 1863, Torlesse was in partnership with Henry Matson, and operated as land agents under the banner of Torlesse & Matson. On the evening of 4 June 1864, a fire started in their building and a large number of wooden buildings were destroyed. Torlesse then bought the section of Wakefield for £1145, and commissioned builders Balke and Brouard to build a new two-storey stone building fronting onto Cathedral Square for £1124. This building was the first building made of permanent material in the Square and became known as the Torlesse Building. It was demolished in 1916, and the Strand picture theatre was built in its place. Today, part of the land is occupied by the ANZ Bank (itself due to be demolished due to earthquake damage), Strand Lane and a building housing a public toilet.

Torlesse made a first ascent of a mountain in the Southern Alps, and this peak, the 1,961 metres (6,434 ft) Mount Torlesse, was named for him.

Torlesse returned to England due to ill health and died in 1866. He is buried in Stoke-by-Nayland.
