= Wairau Affray =

1843 New Zealand conflict

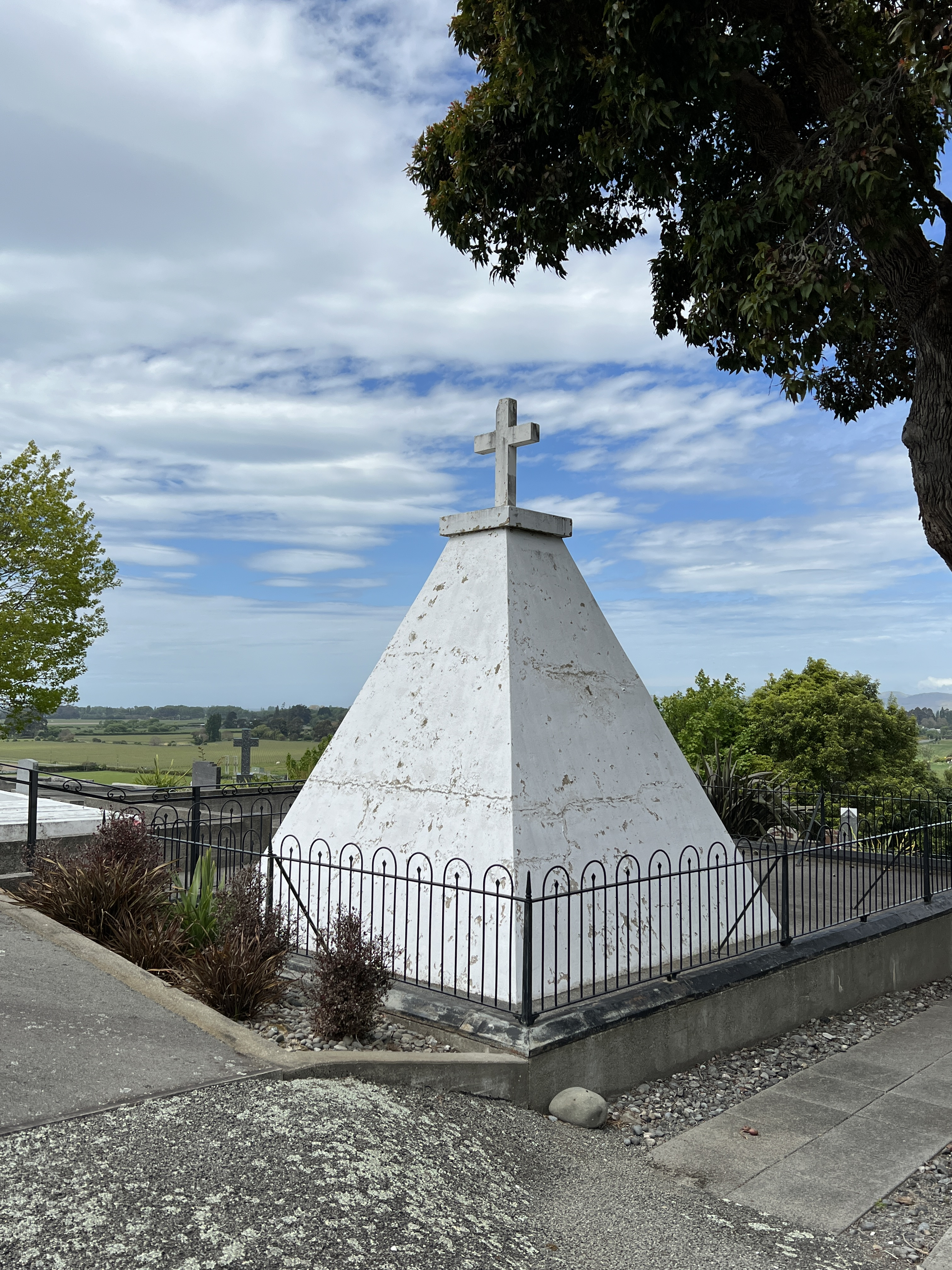
- Wairau Memorial in Tuamarina cemetery
Date	17 June 1843
Location	Tuamarina, Marlborough, New Zealand 41°25′40.5″S 173°57′32.9″E
Result	Ngāti Toa victory

Belligerents
New Zealand Company	Ngāti Toa

Commanders and leaders
Arthur Wakefield †; Henry Thompson †	Te Rauparaha; Te Rangihaeata

Casualties and losses
22 killed 5 wounded	4 killed 3 wounded
- Tuamarina, 10 km north of Blenheim

The Wairau Affray of 17 June 1843, also called the Wairau Massacre and the Wairau Incident, was the first serious clash of arms between British settlers and Māori in New Zealand after the signing of the Treaty of Waitangi and the only one to take place in the South Island. The incident was sparked when a magistrate and a representative of the New Zealand Company, who held a deed to land in the Wairau Valley in the Nelson Province in the north of the South Island, led a group of European settlers to attempt to arrest Ngāti Toa chiefs Te Rauparaha and Te Rangihaeata. Fighting broke out and 22 British settlers were killed, nine after their surrender. Four Māori were killed, including Te Rongo, who was Te Rangihaeata's wife.

The incident heightened fears among settlers of an armed Māori insurrection. It created the first major challenge for Governor Robert FitzRoy, who took up his posting in New Zealand six months later. FitzRoy investigated the incident and exonerated Te Rauparaha and Te Rangihaeata, for which he was strongly criticised by settlers and the New Zealand Company. In 1944 a land claims commission investigation determined that the Wairau Valley had not been legally sold. The government was to pay compensation to the Rangitāne iwi, determined to be the original owners (until the early 1830s, when Te Rauparaha had driven them from the area).

== Background ==
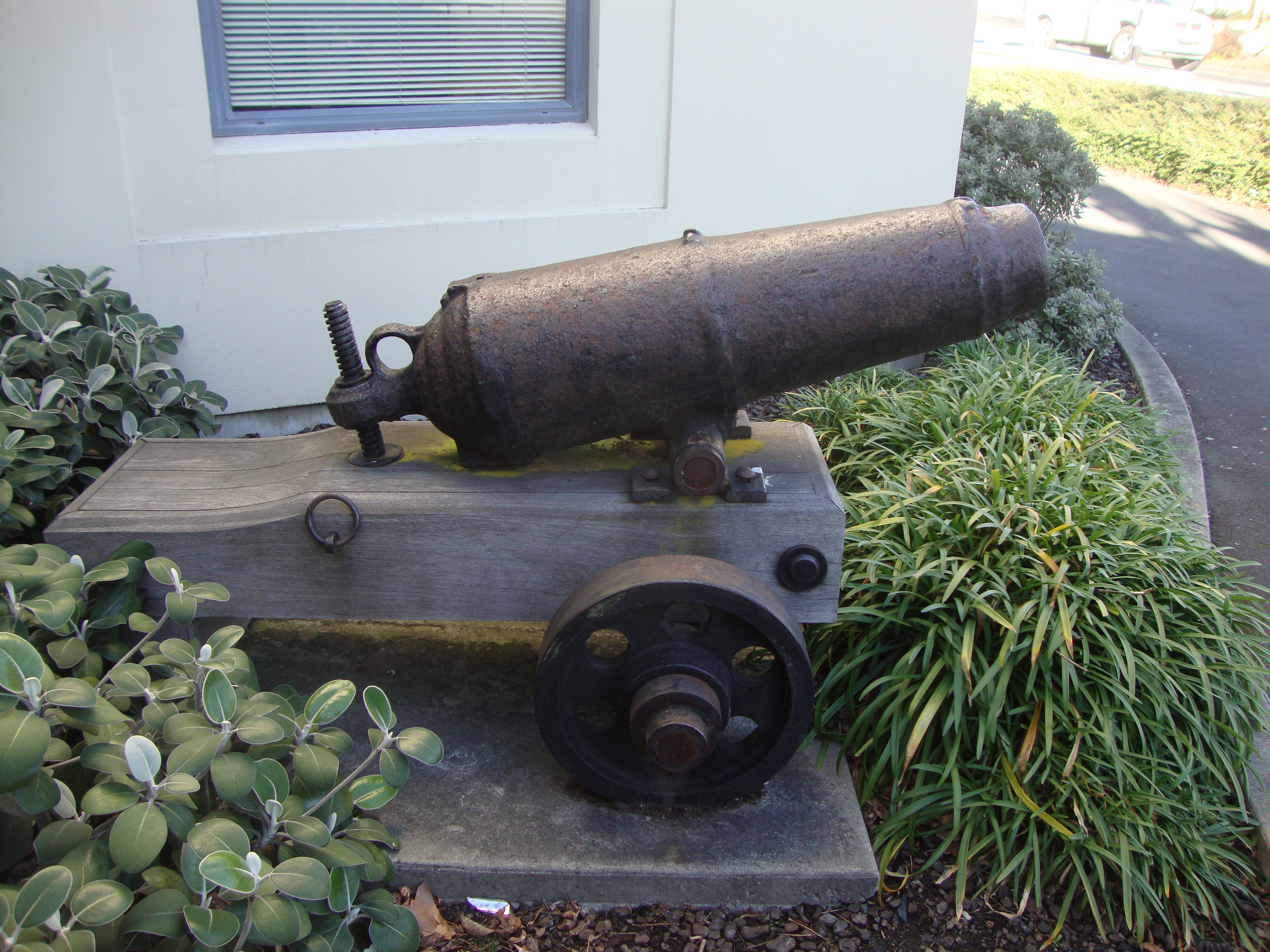
"Blenkinsop's Cannon" outside the Marlborough District Council offices in Blenheim

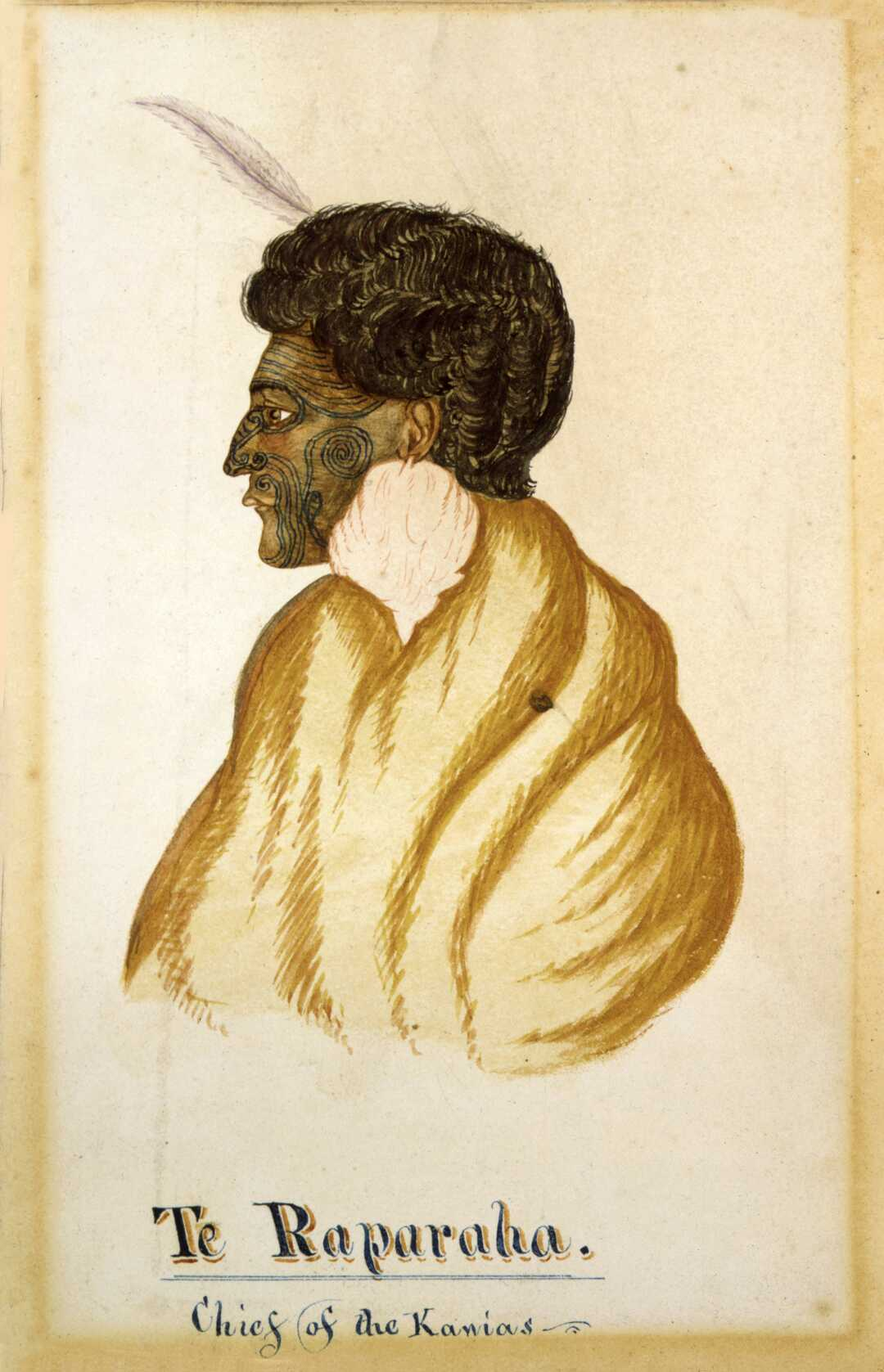
Ngāti Toa chief Te Rauparaha

The New Zealand Company established a settlement at Nelson in the north of the South Island in 1841. It had planned to occupy 200,000 acres (810 km^{2}), but, even as allotments were being sold in England, the company's agents in New Zealand were having difficulty in identifying available land to form the settlement, let alone buying it from local Māori.

Captain Arthur Wakefield had been dispatched by the New Zealand Company to lead the first group of settlers to Nelson. He was the younger brother of Edward Gibbon Wakefield, one of the principal officers of the company, and Colonel William Wakefield. Arthur wrote to Edward that he had located the required amount of land at Wairau. William Wakefield had bought a deed to the land in 1839 from Heni Te Huahua, a widow of whaling captain John William Dundas Blenkinsop. Blenkinsop had also been married to Te Rongo.

Arthur Wakefield wrote to the company in March 1843, "I rather anticipate some difficulty with the natives." The source of the likely difficulty was simple: the chiefs Te Rauparaha and Te Rangihaeata, along with their kinsmen of Ngāti Toa, believed that they owned the land and had not been paid for it. They had controlled the area since the early 1830s, after they defeated the previous occupants, the Rangitāne iwi. Ngāti Toa believed that under British law they were the rightful owners and had not sold the land. They had asked for the surveying to stop until the investigation into the Blenkinsop Indenture (the deed) by Land Commissioner William Spain was concluded.

In January 1843, Nohorua, the older brother of Te Rauparaha, led a delegation of chiefs to Nelson to protest about British activity in the Wairau Plains. Two months later Te Rauparaha and Te Rangihaeata arrived in Nelson, urging that the issue of the land ownership be left to William Spain. Based in Wellington, he had begun investigating all the claimed purchases of the New Zealand Company. Spain later wrote that during that visit, Arthur Wakefield "wished to make them a payment for the Wairau, but they positively refused to sell it, and told him they would never consent to part from it."

Arthur Wakefield rejected the request to wait for Spain's enquiry, informing Te Rauparaha that if local Māori interfered with company surveyors on the land, he would lead 300 constables to arrest him. Wakefield duly despatched three parties of surveyors to the land. They were promptly warned off by local Māori, who damaged the surveyors' tools but left the men unharmed.

Te Rauparaha and Nohorua wrote to Spain on 12 May, urgently asking him to travel to the South Island to settle the company's claim to Wairau. Spain replied that he would do so when his business in Wellington was complete. A month later, with still no sign of Spain, Te Rauparaha led a party to Wairau, where they destroyed all the surveyors' equipment and shelters that had been made with products of the land. They burned down roughly built thatched huts that contained surveying equipment. The surveyors were rounded up and sent unharmed back to Nelson.

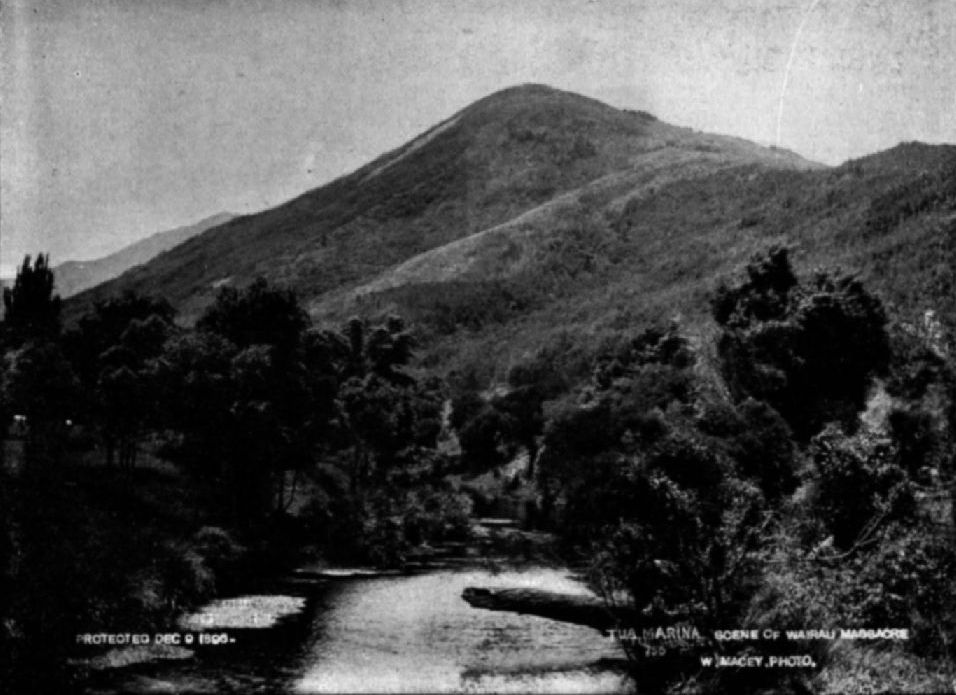
The location of the affray near Tuamarina, c. 1900

== Confrontation ==
Bolstered by a report in the Nelson Examiner newspaper of "Outrages by the Maori at Wairoo", Wakefield assembled a party of men, including Police Magistrate and Native Protector Henry Augustus Thompson, magistrate Captain R. England, Crown prosecutor and newspaper editor G.R. Richardson and about 50 men press-ganged into service, swearing them in as special constables. Thompson issued a warrant for the arrest of Te Rauparaha and Te Rangihaeata for arson. Wakefield referred to the chiefs in a letter as a pair of "travelling bullies".

Thompson commandeered the government brig, which was in Nelson at the time. On the morning of 17 June the party, its size swelled to between 49 and 60 men, including chief surveyor Frederick Tuckett and others who had joined the party after landing, approached the Māori camp. The New Zealand Company's storekeeper James Howard issued the British men with cutlasses, bayonets, pistols and muskets. At the path on the other side of a stream, Te Rauparaha stood surrounded by about 90 warriors, as well as by women and children. He allowed Thompson and five other men to approach him, but requested the rest of the British party to remain on their side of the stream.

Thompson refused to shake hands with Te Rauparaha and said that he had come to arrest him, not over the land issue but for burning the huts. Te Rauparaha replied that the huts had been made from rushes grown on his own land, and thus he had burnt his own property. Thompson insisted on arresting Te Rauparaha, produced a pair of handcuffs, and called out to the men on the far side of the stream, ordering them to fix bayonets and advance. As they began to cross, one of the British fired a shot (apparently by accident). Te Rangihaeata's wife Te Rongo was killed in one of the first volleys, sparking gunfire from both sides. The British retreated across the stream, scrambling up the hill under fire from the Ngāti Toa. Several people from both sides were killed.

Te Rauparaha ordered the Ngāti Toa warriors to cross the stream in pursuit. Those British who had not escaped were quickly overtaken. Wakefield called for a ceasefire and surrendered, along with Thompson, Richardson and ten others. The Maori killed two of the British immediately. Te Rangihaeata demanded utu (revenge) for the death of his wife Te Rongo. The Maori killed all the remaining captives, including Thompson, Samuel Cottrell, a member of the original survey team; interpreter John Brooks, and Captain Wakefield. Four Māori died and three were wounded in the incident. The British lost 22 dead and five wounded.

Te Rongo is sometimes stated to also be Te Rauparaha's daughter but was probably his relation in a different way, she was a chief 'in her own right' and Ngāti Mutunga on her father's side. Her first husband was Captain John Blenkinsop, the man who created the deed that Wakefield purchased and that gave rise to the fighting.

Some survivors fled to Nelson to raise the alarm and a search party, including Wellington magistrates and a group of sailors, returned to Wairau and buried the bodies where they were found. Thirteen were put in one grave and the rest were buried in smaller groups.

Historian Michael Belgrave described the British attempt to survey the land as illegal, inopportune and ultimately disastrous.

== Aftermath ==
Reverberations of a reported massacre were felt as far away as England, where the New Zealand Company was almost ruined by the news of "British citizens being murdered by barbarous natives". Land sales almost halted, and it became obvious the company was being less than honest in its land purchasing tactics, and reports on the events in local newspapers were far from accurate.

In the Nelson area, settlers became increasingly nervous. One group sent a deputation to the Government complaining that those who had died had been discharging their "duty as magistrates and British subjects ... the persons by whom they were killed are murderers in the eyes of common sense and justice".

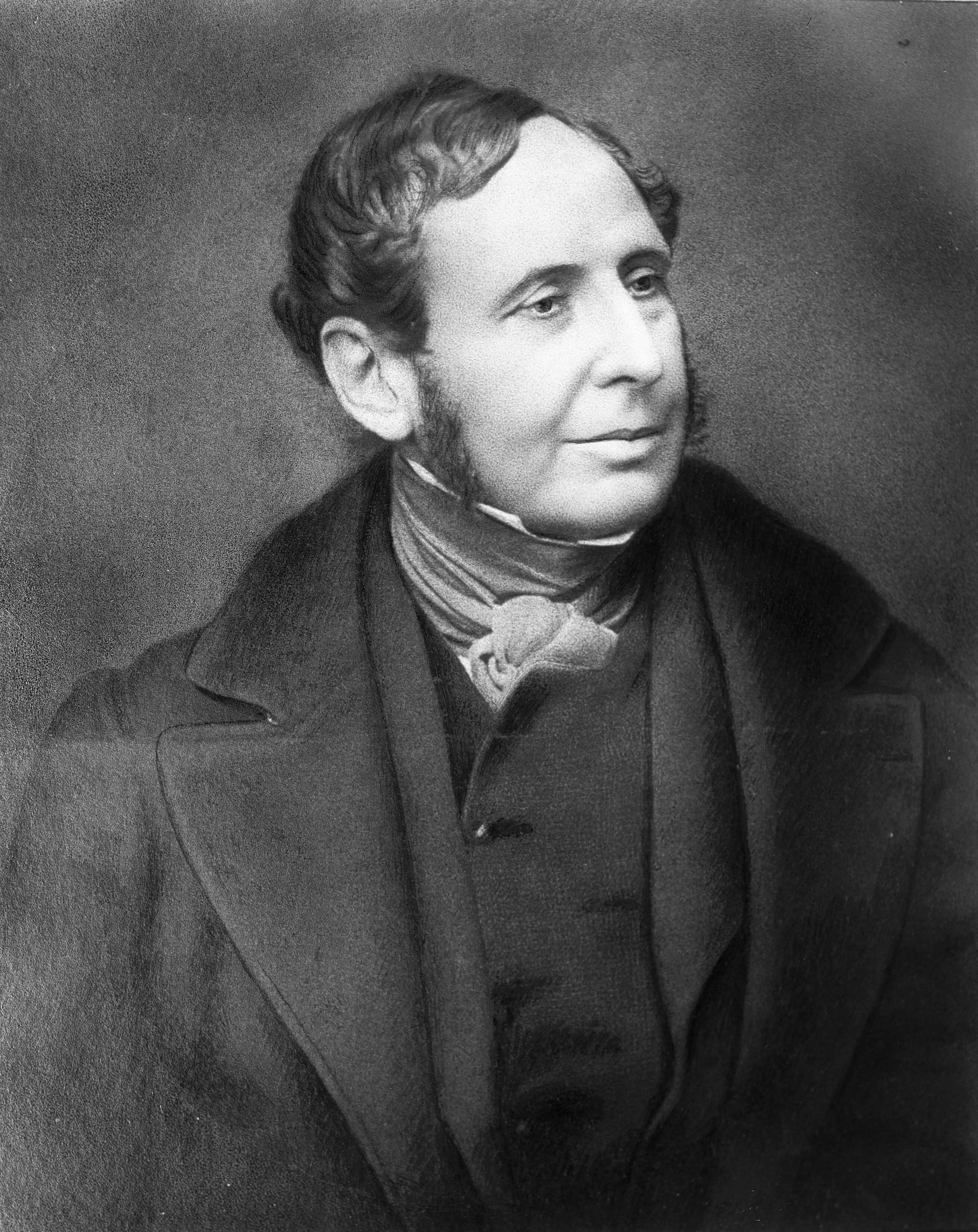
Robert FitzRoy

In late January or early February 1844, a month after taking up his post, incoming Governor Robert FitzRoy visited Wellington and Nelson in a bid to quell the hostility between Māori and British, particularly in the wake of the Wairau Affray. So many conflicting statements had been published that it was impossible for him to decide who had been at fault. But he immediately upbraided New Zealand Company representatives and the editor of a Wellington newspaper, The New Zealand Gazette, for their aggressive attitude towards Māori, warning that he would ensure that "not an acre, not an inch of land belonging to the natives shall be touched without their consent".

He also demanded the resignation of the surviving magistrates who had issued the arrest warrants for the Māori chiefs. "'Arson,' said the Governor, 'is burning another man's house, it is not arson to burn your own house. The natives had never sold the Wairau, the hut which was burned was built on ground which belonged to the natives, and of materials which belonged to them also; consequently no arson was committed and therefore the warrant was illegal.'"

From Nelson, FitzRoy and his officials sailed to Waikanae in the North Island, where he conducted a one-man inquiry into the incident. He opened proceedings by telling a meeting of 500 Māori:

"When I first heard of the Wairau massacre ... I was exceedingly angry ... My first thought was to revenge the deaths of my friends, and the other pakeha who had been killed, and for that purpose to bring many ships of war ... with many soldiers; and had I done so, you would have been sacrificed and your pas destroyed. But when I considered, I saw that the pakeha had in the first instance been very much to blame; and I determined to come down and inquire into all the circumstances and see who was really in the wrong."

Te Rauparaha, Te Rangihaeata and other Māori present were invited to recount their version of events, while FitzRoy took notes and interrupted with further questions. He concluded the meeting by addressing the gathering again, to announce he had made his decision: "In the first place, the white men were in the wrong. They had no right to survey the land ... they had no right to build the houses on the land. As they were, then, first in the wrong, I will not avenge their deaths."

But FitzRoy, who had a background as a humanitarian, told the chiefs they had committed "a horrible crime, in murdering men who had surrendered themselves in reliance on your honour as chiefs. White men never kill their prisoners". He urged British and Māori to live peaceably, with no more bloodshed.

Settlers and the New Zealand Company were incensed by the Governor's finding, but it had been both prudent and pragmatic; Māori outnumbered settlers 900 to one. Many iwi had been amassing weapons for decades, giving them the capacity to annihilate settlements in the Wellington and Nelson areas. FitzRoy knew it was highly improbable that troops would be despatched by the British Government to wage war on the Māori or defend the settlers. FitzRoy's report was endorsed by Colonial Secretary Lord Stanley, who said the actions of the party led by Thompson and Wakefield had been "manifestly illegal, unjust and unwise", and that their deaths had occurred as a "natural and immediate sequence". William Williams, a leading Church Missionary Society missionary, also clearly apportioned blame to "our countrymen, who began with much indiscretion & gave much provocation to the natives".

The effect of the massacre and the passive reaction of FitzRoy set in train a chain of events that still rumble through the New Zealand courts today. Its immediate effect was to alarm settlers in New Plymouth, who had insecure title to land purchased under similar circumstances to Wairau. FitzRoy was very unpopular and was recalled to be replaced by Governor George Grey.

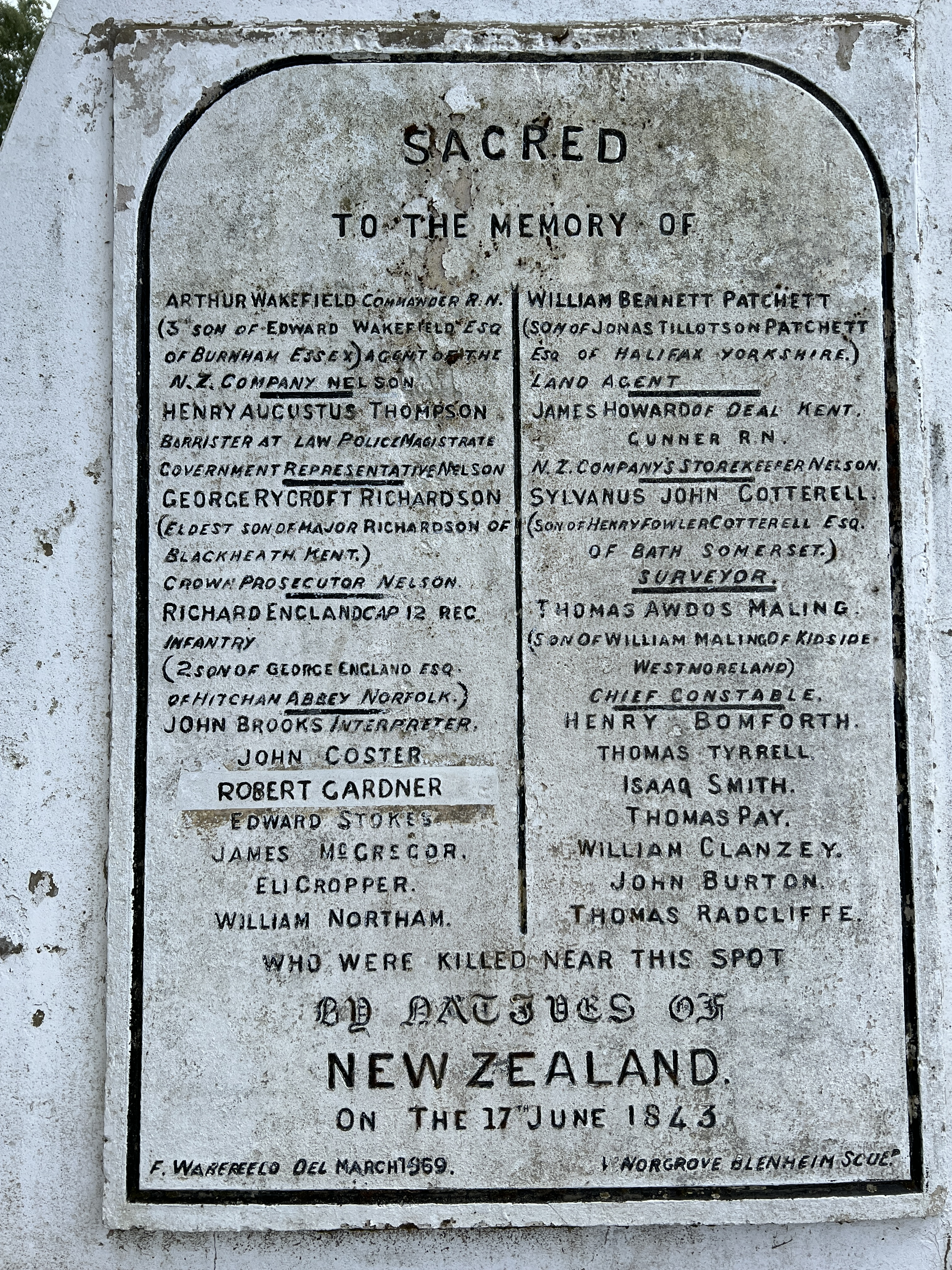
Plaque on 1869 Wairau Monument

After the massacre, Te Rauparaha was captured in 1846 for organising an uprising in the Hutt Valley and was imprisoned on HMS Calliope in Auckland without charges being brought. Author Ranginui Walker has claimed the arrest was delayed punishment for the Wairau killings. The Ngāti Toa iwi sold the Wairau land while Te Rauparaha was held in captivity. After his release, Te Rauparaha returned to the Wairau Valley and was there during the 1848 earthquake.

This rohe (area) has been the subject of a lengthy but successful land/compensation claim by the original Rangitane iwi, which had been displaced in the 1820s by Te Rauparaha's heke. The Rangitāne iwi are recognised as the tangata whenua (people of the land). In 1944 a government investigation established that the Wairau land had never been legally sold to the settlers. Compensation of some $2 million is to be paid by the government of New Zealand.

== Memorial ==
In 1869 the Nelson community erected a memorial at Tuamarina Cemetery to commemorate the European casualties of the incident, with their names and the occupations listed on the inscription. The plaque had to be replaced shortly after when numerous spelling errors were discovered.

== See also ==
- New Zealand Wars

== Works cited ==
- Belgrave, Michael (2005). Historical Frictions: Maori Claims and Reinvented Histories. Auckland: Auckland University Press. ISBN 1869403207.
- Belich, James (1986). The New Zealand Wars and the Victorian Interpretation of Racial Conflict (1st ed.). Auckland: Penguin. ISBN 014011162X.
- Burns, Patricia (1989). Fatal Success: A History of the New Zealand Company (1st ed.). Auckland: Heinemann Reed. ISBN 0790000113.
- Keenan, Danny (2009). Wars Without End: The Land Wars in Nineteenth-century New Zealand. Auckland: Penguin.
- King, Michael (2003). The Penguin History of New Zealand. Penguin Books. ISBN 0143018671.
- Moon, Paul (2000). FitzRoy: Governor in Crisis 1843–1845. David Ling Publishing. ISBN 0908990707.
