= Felix Wakefield =

English colonist (1807–1875)

Felix Wakefield (30 November 1807 – 23 December 1875) was an English colonist, who settled in New Zealand.

== Early life ==
Felix Wakefield was born in 1807, the seventh child and sixth son of Edward Wakefield (1774–1854), a distinguished surveyor and land agent, and Susanna Crush (1767–1816) of Felstead. His grandmother, Priscilla Wakefield (1751–1832), was a popular author for the young, and one of the introducers of savings banks. He was the brother of: Catherine Gurney Wakefield (1793–1873), the mother of Charles Torlesse (1825–1866); Edward Gibbon Wakefield (1796–1862); Daniel Bell Wakefield (1798–1858); Arthur Wakefield (1799–1843); William Hayward Wakefield (1801–1848); John Howard Wakefield (1803–1862); Priscilla Susannah Wakefield (1809–1887); Percy Wakefield (1810–1832); and an unnamed child born in 1813.

In 1831 Felix married Marie Bailley, by whom he had nine children.

== Life ==
When he left school Felix began working with his father and training as a surveyor and civil engineer. This was interrupted, however, in 1826 as a result of the scandal surrounding his brothers, Edward Gibbon and William Wakefield and also his stepmother. When he eventually finished his training he rejoined his father, now in exile in Blois, France. Soon afterwards he impregnated a servant girl, Marie Bailley and was required to marry her. In 1832 the young family emigrated to Tasmania where Felix was employed as a surveyor. Although initially successful, Felix's work did not impress the authorities and such was his personality that when criticised he usually resorted to litigation and argument. As a result of this, he became extremely unpopular and eventually unemployable. Various attempts to recoup his fortunes were unsuccessful and by 1846 the family was destitute. Abandoning his wife and youngest child in Tasmania, Felix took the other eight children and returned to England.

Most of the responsibility for supporting the family fell on his older sister, Catherine Torlesse, mother of Charles Torlesse, and brother, Edward Gibbon, who was himself recovering from a major stroke. But Edward Gibbon was also involved in the promotion and planning of a new scheme for the colonisation of New Zealand, the Canterbury Association, under the auspices of the Church of England and he persuaded himself that his brother Felix and his surveying skills had a contribution to make. The plan that Felix drew up for surveying the Canterbury Plains was largely adopted and contributed significantly to the early success of the colony. However, it was not easy, as Felix was just as hard to work with in England as he had been in Tasmania.

Eventually, relations between the brothers were so bad that Edward Gibbon more or less wrote off his brother's debts, paid him a substantial sum of money, and sent him off to New Zealand.

== New Zealand ==
Felix Wakefield arrived in New Zealand with six of his children in November 1851 and immediately began feuding with the agents of the Canterbury Association about the land allocated to him. There were also questions about various sums of money that he was unable to account for satisfactorily. A few months later he leased the store at Redcliffs, installed his children in the care of his eldest daughter, Constance, now twenty years old, and departed for Wellington.

In Wellington, he met up with another brother, Daniel Bell Wakefield, resumed his campaign against Edward Gibbon, and started a new campaign aiming to have the administrators of the Canterbury Settlement replaced. Then at the end of March, after less than five months in the colony, he returned to London. There he continued his vendettas with such vehemence that he was summoned to appear in court, charged with uttering threats against the Canterbury Association's Land Agent, John Robert Godley. And then, just as precipitately, he returned to New Zealand.

He arrived in Nelson, New Zealand in 1854, bringing with him two red deer. They thrived in New Zealand and went on to destroy much of the country's native forests. Felix returned to Canterbury where here his welcome was very cool. By August he was again in trouble, this time for attempting to evict the tenant from a building owned by his nephew, Jerningham Wakefield. Shortly afterwards he quit Canterbury, this time taking his children with him and returned to Nelson where they stayed for a short while before sailing once again back to England.

He stayed away from New Zealand for ten years, during much of the time he was involved in litigation over various issues about land in New Zealand. He also served in the Crimean War, acting briefly as an engineer on the construction of the Balaclava Railway. He may also have been involved in the Indian Mutiny of 1857.

Finally in January 1864 he returned to New Zealand, this time bringing with him a flock of skylarks. He settled in Nelson for a while, tried Canterbury for a period and then moved on to Wellington and then back once again to Nelson where in 1870 he was employed as a post office clerk until he retired in 1874. Wakefield died of a heart attack in Sumner on 23 December 1875. He is buried at Barbadoes Street Cemetery.

His son Edward Wakefield was a New Zealand politician and journalist.

== Sources ==
- McLintock, A. H., ed. (1966). "Wakefield, Felix". Encyclopedia of New Zealand.
- Temple, Phillip (2002). A Sort of Conscience; The Wakefields. Auckland University Press. Review of book in NZHerald
