= HMS Rhadamanthus (1832) =

Sloop of the Royal Navy

History

United Kingdom
- Name: HMS Rhadamanthus
- Ordered: 12 January 1831
- Builder: Plymouth Dockyard
- Cost: £31,919
- Laid down: September 1831
- Launched: 16 April 1832
- Completed: 2 November 1832
- Commissioned: 4 October 1832
- Fate: Breaking completed at Sheerness 8 February 1864

General characteristics
- Type: Paddle sloop
- Displacement: 1,086 tons
- Tons burthen: 813 bm
- Length: 164 ft 7 in (50.2 m) gundeck; 143 ft 2 in (43.6 m) keel for tonnage
- Beam: 32 ft 10 in (10.0 m) maximum; 32 ft 8 in (10.0 m) for tonnage
- Draught: 11 ft 0 in (3.4 m) (forward); 13 ft 0 in (4.0 m) (aft)
- Depth of hold: 17 ft 10 in (5.44 m)
- Propulsion: 220 nominal horsepower; 385 ihp (287 kW); 2-cylinder side lever steam engine; Paddles
- Sail plan: Schooner rig, later changed to barquentine
- Speed: 10 knots (19 km/h) (under steam)
- Complement: 135
- Armament: 1 × 10-inch (84 cwt) pivot gun; 2 (later 3) × 32-pounder (25 cwt) guns; 2 × 6-pounder (6 cwt) brass guns

HMS Rhadamanthus was one of the initial steam powered vessels built for the Royal Navy. On 10 January 1831 the First Sea Lord gave orders that four paddle vessels be built to competitive designs. The vessels were to be powered by Maudslay, Son & Field steam engines, carry a schooner rig and mount one or two 10-inch shell guns. Initially classed simply as a steam vessel (SV), she was re-classed as a second-class steam sloop in 1846. Designed by Thomas Roberts, the Master Shipwright of Plymouth. She was launched and completed in 1832, She was converted into a transport in 1841 then in 1851 she was a troopship and by the 1860s she was a transport again. Her breaking was completed in February 1864.

Rhadamanthus was the only named vessel in the Royal Navy.

== Design and specifications ==
Her keel was laid in September 1831 at Plymouth Dockyard and launched on 16 April 1832. Her gun deck was 164 feet 7 inches (50.17 metres) with her keel length reported for tonnage calculation was 143 feet 2 inches (43.64 metres). Her maximum breadth was 32 feet 10 inches (10.01 metres) with 32 feet 8 inches (9.96 metres) being reported for tonnage. Her depth of hold was 17 feet 10 inches (5.44 metres). Her light draught was 11 feet 0 inches (3.35 metres) forward and 13 feet 0 inches (3.96 metres) aft. Her builder's measure tonnage was 813 tons though her displacement was 1,086 tons. Upon launch she was sailed to Woolwich to have her machinery fitted.

Her machinery was supplied by Maudslay, Son & Field of Lambeth. She was fitted with two fire-tube rectangular boilers. Her steam engine was a two-cylinder vertical single expansion (VSE) engine rated at 220 nominal horsepower (NHP). During her steam trials the engine generated 385 indicated horsepower (287 kW) for a speed of 10 knots (19 km/h). She originally was to have a schooner sail plan, however, this was changed to a barque or barquentine sail rig.

Her armament would initially consist of one Miller's Original 10-inch 84 hundredweight (cwt) (Note: "cwt", or "hundredweight" refers to the weight of the gun itself.) muzzle-loading smoothbore (MLSB) shell gun on a pivot mount and two Bloomfield's 32-pounder (Note: "32-pounder" refers to the weight of the shot fired.) 25 cwt MLSB guns and two 6-pounder brass MLSB guns on broadside trucks. The brass guns were later removed and one 32-pounder 42 cwt MLSB was fitted on a pivot mount.

She was completed on 2 November 1832 at an initial cost of £31,919 (building - £18,534, fitting - £2,197 and machinery - £11,188). (Note: A total cost accounting for inflation of approximately £2,863,000 in today's money.)

== Commissioned service ==
=== First commission ===
She was first commissioned on 4 October 1832 for the blockade of the Dutch Coast during the Belgian war of Independence. At the end of the blockade duties she was assigned to the North America and West Indies Station. She returned to Home Water, paying off at Woolwich on 21 April 1835. During 1836 she underwent a major refit at Woolwich Dockyard.

=== Second commission ===
She was recommissioned on 23 October 1836 under Commander John Duffill, RN, as a packet vessel for the coast of Spain. On 13 July 1837 Commander Arthur Wakefield took command and assigned to the Mediterranean. She returned to Home Waters to pay off on 20 October 1840. She was refitted as a transport at Sheerness before returning to Woolwich.

== Ancillary service ==
She commissioned on 28 April 1841 under Thomas Laen, Master at Woolwich. On 29 June she was under Jonathan Aylen, Master. She paid off at Woolwich on 13 February 1849. She was fitted as a troopship in March 1851. She recommissioned under John Belam, Master for Particular Service. John E. Perry, master (temporary) took over on 17 November 1855, then on 25 January 1856 Edmund P. Cole, Master was in command, following with Frederick R. Strudee, Master on 29 October 1857 and finally George Raymond, Master on 8 December 1862.

== Disposition ==
She paid off for the last time on 11 June 1863 at Sheerness. Her breaking was completed on 8 February 1864.
