= Elizabeth Torlesse =

New Zealand community leader (1835–1922)

Elizabeth Henrietta Torlesse (1835 – 22 September 1922) was a New Zealand homemaker and community leader.

She was born in County Wicklow, Ireland in about 1835 as Elizabeth Henrietta Revell. The Revell family came to New Zealand on the Minerva in 1853. She married Henry Torlesse, who was also a passenger on the Minerva. Henry Torlesse farmed with his brother Charles Torlesse, who had first come to New Zealand in the early 1840s. The Torlesse brothers were nephews of Edward Gibbon Wakefield.

Her husband died in 1870. She died on 22 September 1922 at her daughter's place in Christchurch.
