= Arthur Wakefield =

New Zealand coloniser (1799–1843)

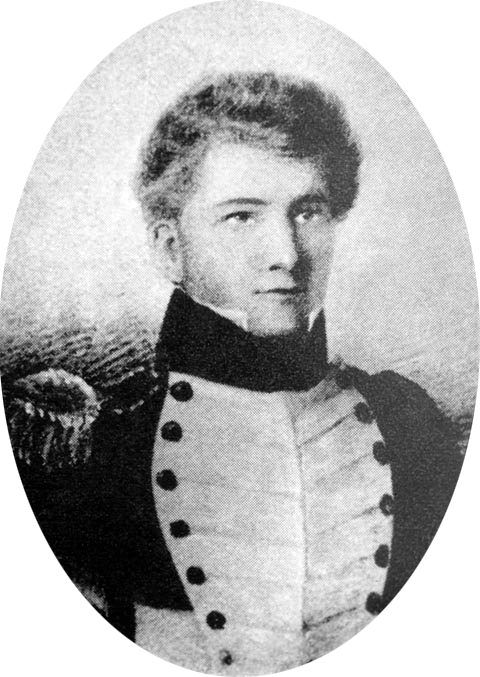
- Lieutenant Arthur Wakefield, RN
- Born: 19 November 1799; Burnham Wick, Essex, England
- Died: 17 June 1843 (aged 43); Wairau Valley, New Zealand
- Relatives: Edward Wakefield (brother); Daniel Wakefield (brother); William Wakefield (brother); Felix Wakefield (brother)
- Military career
- Allegiance: United Kingdom
- Branch: Royal Navy
- Service years: 1810–1841
- Rank: Commander
- Served on: HMS Nisus, 1810–14; HMS Hebrus, 1814–16; HMS Queen Charlotte, 1818–19; HMS Superb, 1819–22; HMS Brazen, 1823–26; HMS Conflict, 1826–28; HMS Rose, 1828–30; HMS Winchester, 1832–33; HMS Thunderer, 1833–37; HMS Rhadamanthus, 1839–41
- Commands: HMS Conflict; HMS Rose (temporary); HMS Rhadamanthus
- Known for: Founder of Nelson, New Zealand
- Campaigns: Invasion of Java, 1811; Fort Cornelis, 1811; War of 1812; Chesapeake campaign; Bladensburg, 1814; Washington, 1814; Baltimore, 1814; Algiers, 1816
- Awards: Mentioned in despatches, 1814.
- Memorials: Wairau Affray Memorial, Tuamarina Cemetery, Marlborough Region; Christ Church Cathedral, Nelson (plaque); Wakefield's Memorial Riwaka and Puketawai Pā
- Other work: Agent for Nelson, New Zealand Company

Arthur Wakefield (19 November 1799 – 17 June 1843) was an English Navy officer who served with the Royal Navy before joining his brother, Edward Gibbon Wakefield, in founding the New Zealand Company settlement of Nelson in New Zealand.

== Early life ==
Arthur Wakefield was born in Essex, England, a son of Edward Wakefield (1774–1854), a distinguished surveyor and land agent, and Susanna Crash (1767–1816). His grandmother, Priscilla Wakefield (1751–1832), was a popular author for the young, and one of the introducers of savings banks. He was the brother of Catherine Gurney Wakefield (1793–1873), Edward Gibbon Wakefield (1796–1862), Daniel Bell Wakefield (1798–1858), William Hayward Wakefield (1801–1848), John Howard Wakefield (1803–1862), Felix Wakefield (1807–1875), Priscilla Susannah Wakefield (1809–1887), Percy Wakefield (1810–1832), and an unnamed child born in 1813.

== Royal Navy ==
Wakefield joined the Royal Navy at age eleven. He saw action in the Dutch East Indies, and was part of the force that captured and burnt Washington, D.C. during the War of 1812. He took part in the bombardment of Algiers in 1816. In the post-Napoleonic period he was stationed off South America, involved in diplomatic duties during the various wars of independence. He then spent several years off the coast of West Africa as part of the flotilla engaged in the suppression of the slave trade. He also saw duty in the North Atlantic, the West Indies and the Mediterranean Sea. He was eventually given command of his own ship, HM steam frigate Rhadamanthus. However, in 1837 he was passed over for promotion, so, recognising that his career was going nowhere, he resigned from the Navy in 1841.

== New Zealand Company ==
Immediately after Arthur Wakefield left the Navy in 1841, his brother, Edward Gibbon Wakefield recruited him to join the New Zealand Company, tasking him to select settlers for a new settlement to be named Nelson, escort the party to New Zealand, and supervise the growth of the new town. Arthur Wakefield sailed, in company with Captain Francis Liardet, RN, on the Whitby from London in April 1841, arriving at Wellington on 18 September 1841. The first immigrant ships arrived in Nelson in February 1842.

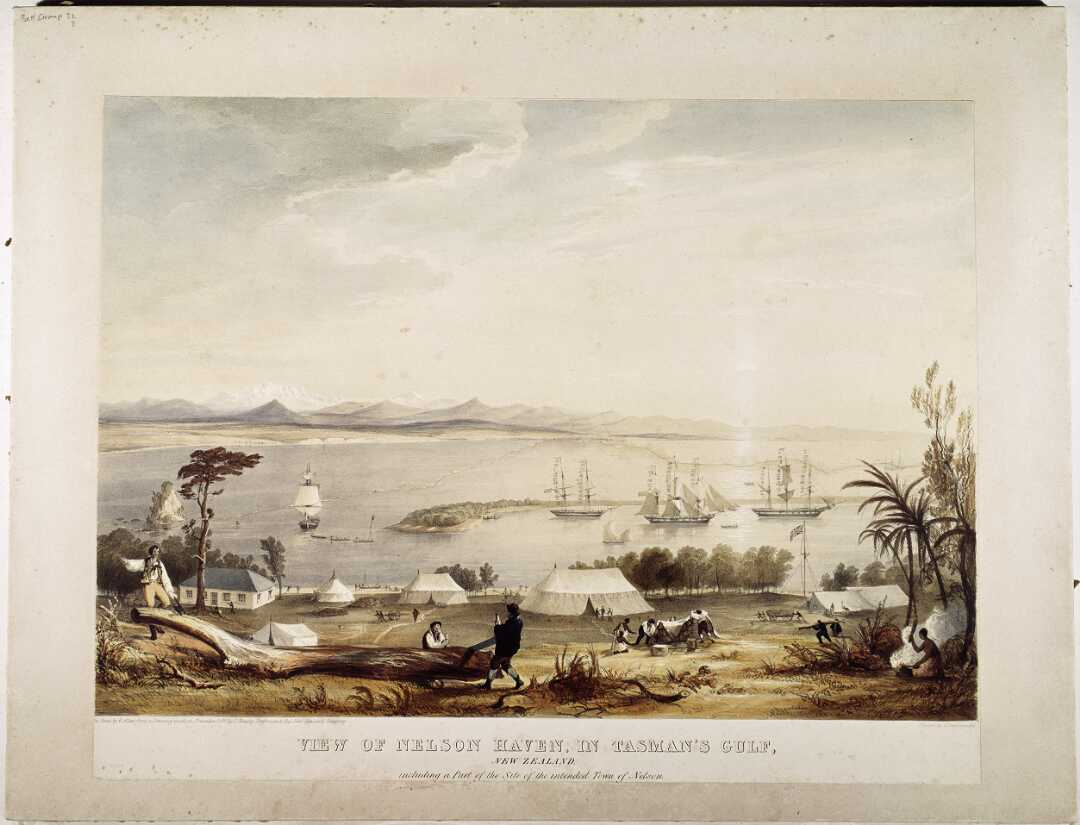
View of Nelson Haven, 1841. Artist: Thomas Allom after Charles Heaphy

The settlement of Nelson got off to a good start. In the first two years, 18 ships transported more than 3,000 colonists. Wakefield actively worked to promote the orderly development of the colony.

However, the new colony encountered serious difficulties in subsequent months. The biggest problem was the lack of arable land. The New Zealand Company, and particularly Wakefield's brother, had made extravagant promises to the settlers about the availability of land. Each settler family had been offered 1 acre (4,000 m^{2}) of urban land, 50 acres (200,000 m^{2}) of suburban land, and 150 acres (600,000 m^{2}) of rural land. However, the company had nothing like that amount of land available and the existing owners—the native Māori—proved very reluctant to sell their land and not inclined to trust the New Zealand Company's promises.

Furthermore, the newly established colonial government, under Governor William Hobson in Auckland, was not at all sympathetic to their problems. One of the basic tenets of the Treaty of Waitangi (1840), between the British Crown and various Māori chiefs, was the understanding that the Crown would protect Māori from attempts to defraud them of their land.

On the other hand, some members of the New Zealand Company and many of the settlers saw Māori as ignorant savages who had no right to stand in the way of honest British colonists. This was a period when the growing British Empire was very aware of what it saw as its manifest destiny, to rule the native peoples of the world. The British colonists believed they were owed the land, and resented the fact that their survival was dependent on the goodwill of Māori, who held all the power.

In summary, Arthur Wakefield found he had far more settlers than he had land for and they were not happy. For once, Edward Gibbon Wakefield urged caution, but he was in London and his brother Arthur was the man on the spot.

== Death ==
The Chief Magistrate in Nelson, Henry Thompson, was a very hot-tempered, arrogant man who was not prepared to accept that the Nelson settlement did not own and control the Wairau Plains. Te Rauparaha and Te Rangihaeata visited Nelson and made it very clear that they would not allow the settlers to occupy the Wairau Plain. Despite that, Wakefield and Thompson sent out surveyors. The Māori very firmly, but without violence, escorted them off their land and burnt down their hut.

Thompson immediately issued a warrant for the arrest of the two chiefs on a charge of arson. He and Wakefield then recruited a group of special constables and led them off to carry out the arrest. The result was the Wairau Affray, in which Arthur Wakefield and 21 other of the party were killed by the Māori.

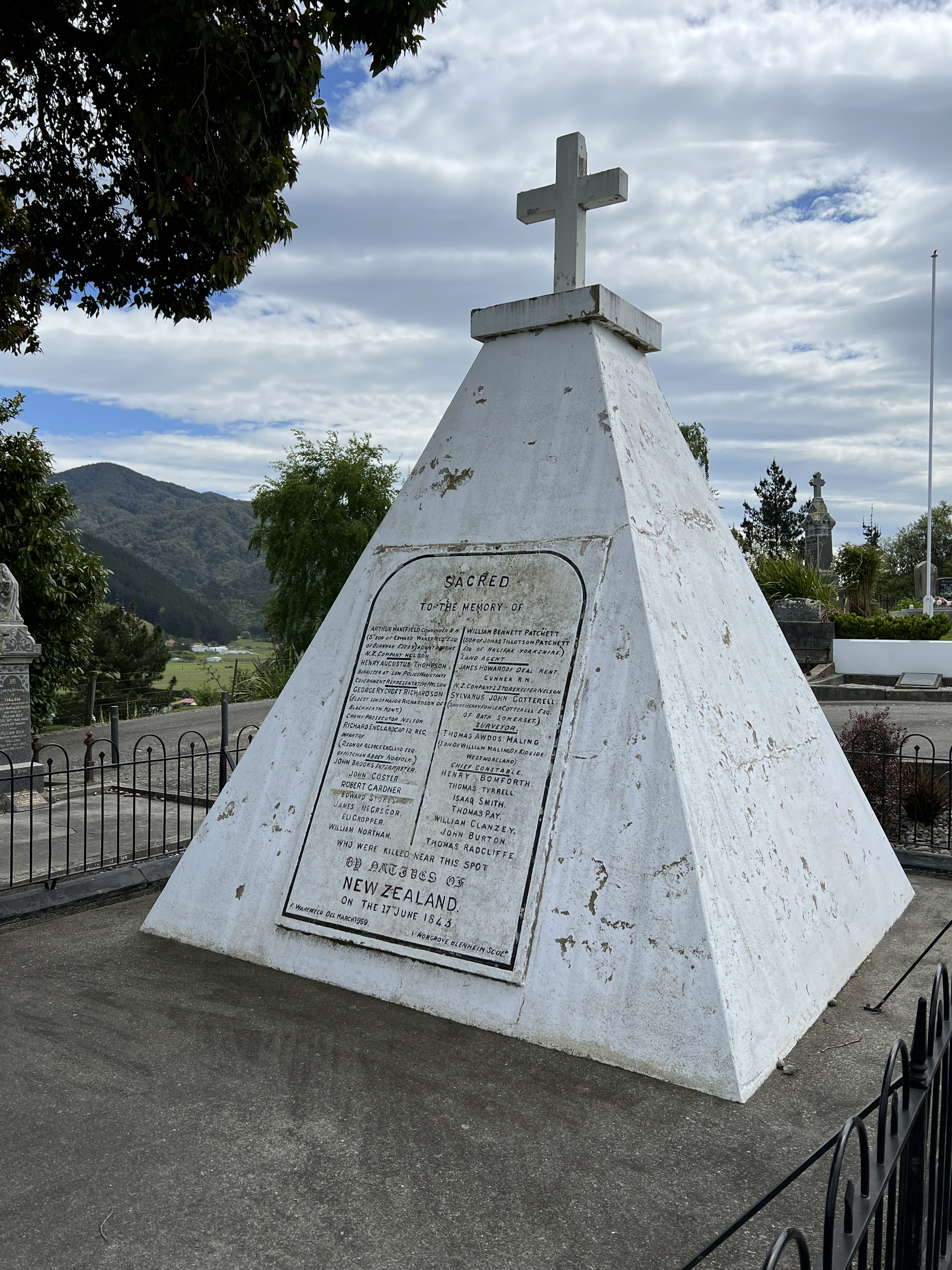
Wairau Affray Memorial, Tuamarina Cemetery

It is difficult to apportion the blame for this disaster. Henry Thompson appears to have been the driving force behind the attempt to arrest Te Rauparaha and he already had a reputation for headstrong, irrational impulses. But Wakefield was supposed to be in command of the settlement. His brother had told him that the claim to the land was invalid. It seems that he yielded to the pressures and expectations of the people around him and particularly to Thompson. It is still unknown as to what initiated the incident at Wairau yet Wakefield, Thompson and seven other settlers surrendered during the clash and were summarily executed on the orders of Chief Te Rangihaeata who was enraged and demanded utu (revenge) for the death of his wife Rongo, Te Rauparaha's daughter, who had been shot in the affray. It is claimed that his head was laid on a loaf of bread as a final insult, echoing his arrogant quote that he could buy the Maori with "sugar and bread".

The subsequent government inquiry found the whole expedition had been illegal and exonerated the Māori. This did not sit well with the colonists, who immediately began a political campaign against Governor Robert FitzRoy that contributed to his early recall.

== Commemoration ==
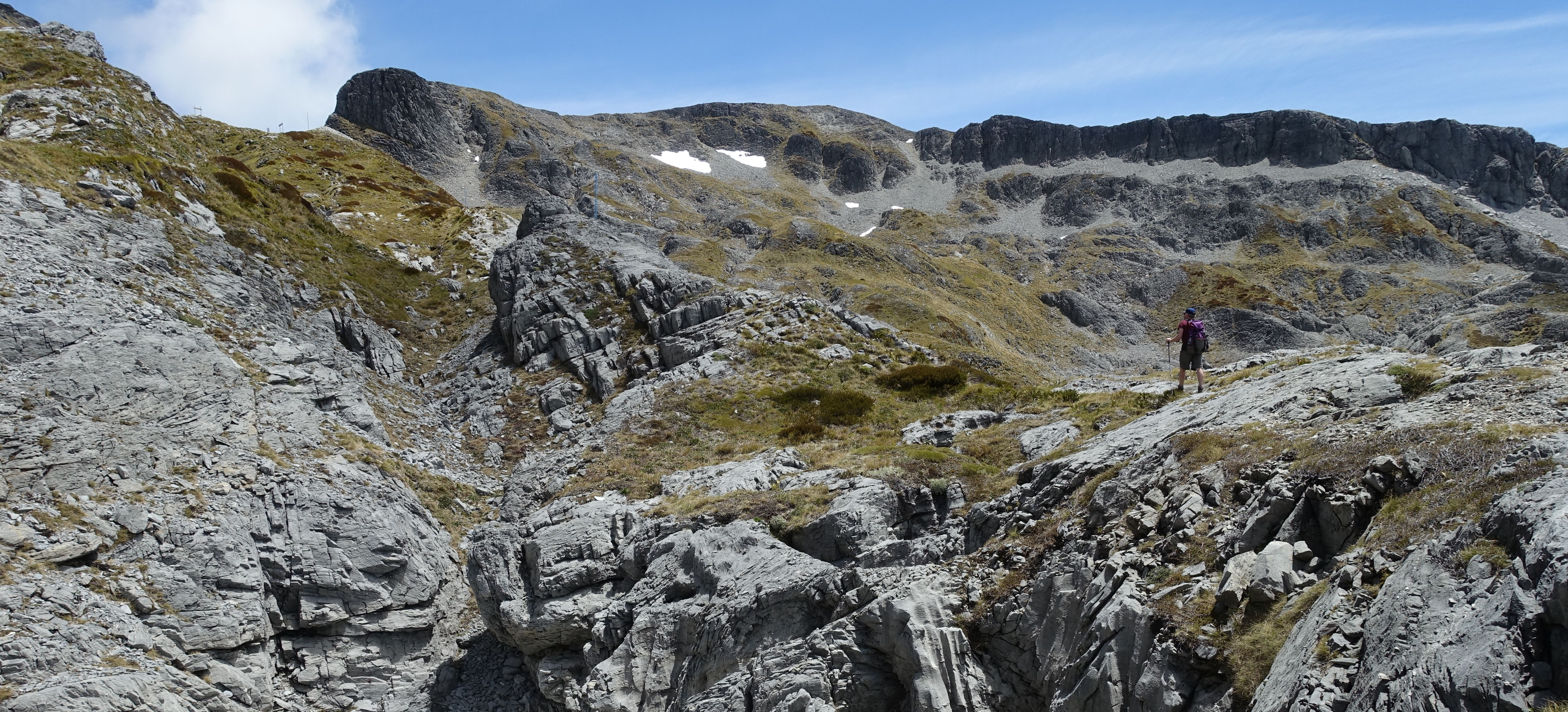
View up Mount Arthur

Fort Arthur, built in 1843, once stood on the hill where Christ Church Cathedral, Nelson, now stands.

Nelson is now a thriving city. The community of Wakefield south of Nelson is not believed to be named after him, but it was renamed shortly before his death. The Wairau Affray is believed to have assisted in the new name becoming established.

The Arthur Range in what is now Kahurangi National Park was explored by Arthur Dudley Dobson, and the range and Mount Arthur were named by Dobson after Arthur Wakefield.
