= Godley =

Godley may refer to:

== People ==
- Adam Godley (born 1964), British actor
- Alfred Denis Godley, known as A. D. Godley (1856–1925), English classical scholar and author of light verse
- Alexander Godley (1867–1957), British Army General with the New Zealand and Australian Division at Gallipoli; cousin of the 1st Baron Kilbracken
- Arthur Godley, 1st Baron Kilbracken (1847–1932), British Permanent Under-Secretary of State for India; cousin of Alexander Godley
- Bill Godley (1879–unknown), English footballer
- Charlotte Godley (1821–1907) was a New Zealand letter-writer and community leader; mother of Arthur Godley
- Eric Godley (1919–2010), New Zealand botanist and biographer
- G. McMurtrie Godley (1917–1999), U.S. Ambassador to Laos and Assistant Secretary of State for East Asian and Pacific Affairs
- George Godley (1857–1941), British police officer involved in the hunt for Jack the Ripper in 1888
- Hugh Godley, 2nd Baron Kilbracken (1877–1950), Irish nobleman
- Janey Godley (1961–2024), Scottish comedian, newspaper columnist, and author
- John Godley, 3rd Baron Kilbracken (1920–2006), British-born Irish peer
- John Robert Godley (1814–1861), British bureaucrat and statesman; an original resident in Canterbury, New Zealand
- Kevin Godley (born 1945), British musician and music video director and part of the Godley & Creme musical partnership
- Leonidas M. Godley (1836–1904), American Civil War Union Army soldier; recipient of the Medal of Honor
- Robert Godley (born 1971), British designer of men's clothing
- Sandra Godley, British singer-songwriter, broadcaster and philanthropist
- Sean Godley (born 1981), Irish-Australian poet and writer, brother of the 4th Baron Kilbracken
- Sidney Godley (1889–1957), British Army World War I soldier and German prisoner of war; recipient of the Victoria Cross
- Wynne Godley (1926–2010), British economist
- Zack Godley (born 1990), American professional baseball pitcher

== Places ==
New Zealand

- Godley Head, northern headland to Lyttelton Harbour

United Kingdom

- Godley, Greater Manchester

- Godley East railway station
- Godley railway station
- Godley Reservoir

- Godley Hundred in Surrey

United States

- Godley, Illinois

- Godley Independent School District

- Godley, Texas

== Other ==
- Godley & Creme, English rock duo composed of Kevin Godley and Lol Creme

- Changing Faces – The Very Best of 10cc and Godley & Creme, released in 1987
- Cry (Godley & Creme song), released in 1985
- Consequences (Godley & Creme album), released in 1977
- Freeze Frame (Godley & Creme album), released in 1979

- Godley River, alpine braided river flowing through Canterbury in New Zealand
- Godley Statue, Christchurch memorial for John Robert Godley
