= Mary Townsend (artist) =

English-New Zealand settler and artist

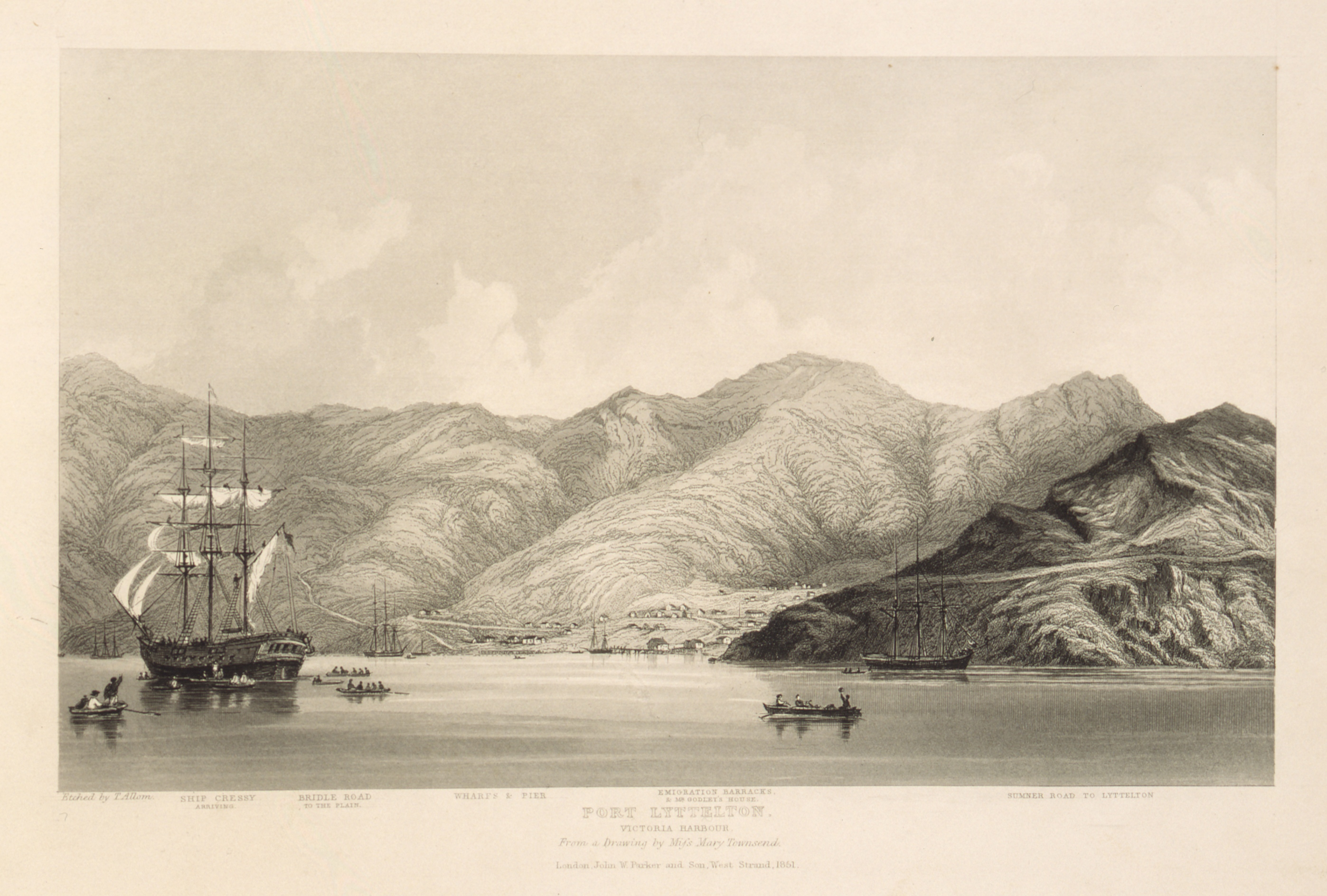
Drawing of Lyttelton Harbour by Townsend

Mary Townsend (1822 – 31 December 1869) was an artist and an early English settler in Canterbury, New Zealand.

Townsend emigrated to Canterbury from England in 1850 with her parents, nine siblings and a cousin. Her father was James Townsend (1788–1866), whose first home in Canterbury gave its name to the Christchurch suburb of Ferrymead. They arrived at Lyttelton on the Cressy, one of Canterbury's First Four Ships. She had already had some years of art training in England before emigrating, and on arrival she continued to paint. She specialised in portraits, and her portrait of the Chairman of the Colonists' Association (her husband, Dr Donald) was exhibited in Christchurch in 1852. Townsend also produced drawings and watercolours of Lyttelton, one of which was used to illustrate the Canterbury Association's Canterbury Papers 1850–1851. In 1870, Townsend's work was included in the first art exhibition held in Christchurch, staged by the Canterbury Provincial Council and held at a temporary annex of the Canterbury Museum.

Fellow settler Charlotte Godley commissioned Townsend to paint a portrait of her husband John Godley, the Chief Agent of the Canterbury Association, and another of their infant son, Arthur. The portrait of Arthur Godley is in the collection of Canterbury Museum, while the Christchurch Art Gallery holds the painting of John Godley.

On 20 November 1851 she married William Donald, Medical Officer of Health for Lyttelton. Her elder sister Frances married William John Warburton Hamilton in 1855. Mary Donald suffered an attack of paralysis in mid-1867 and never fully recovered. She died from another episode on 31 December 1869. She was buried at Lyttelton Cemetery.
