= Frances Elizabeth Wynne =

Welsh artist (1836–1907)

- Born: 1836
- Died: 13 January 1907 (aged 70–71)
- Father: Charles Griffith-Wynne
- Relatives: Charlotte Griffith-Wynne (sister); Charles Wynne (brother); John Wynne (brother); Charles Finch (grandfather)
- Known for: Sketches

Frances Elizabeth Wynne (1836 – 13 January 1907) was a prolific amateur artist who sketched many scenes in Britain and Europe. Wynne toured Europe on several occasions between the 1850s and 1900. She was the daughter of Charles Griffith-Wynne MP.

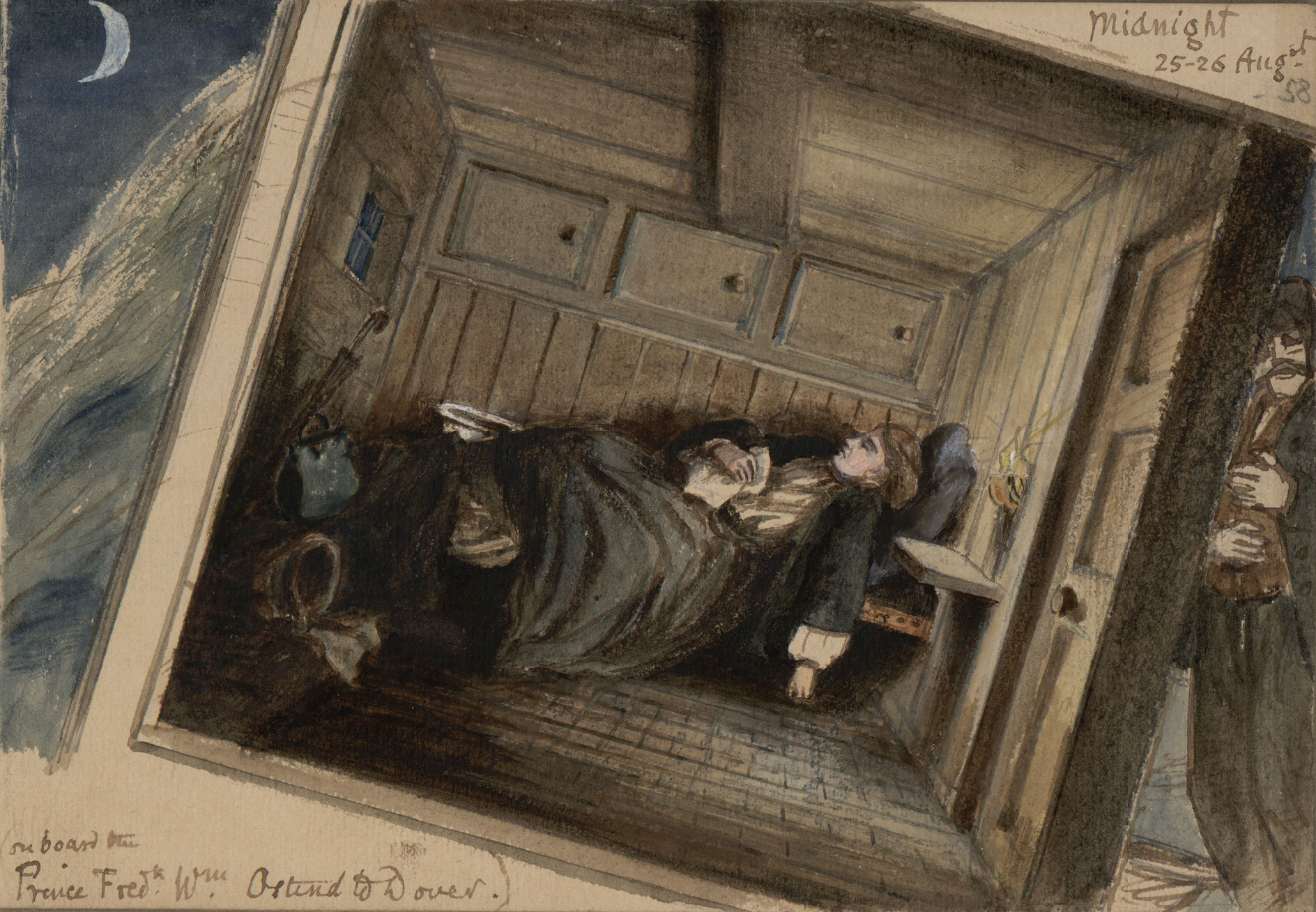
A self-portrait depicting a ferry crossing between Ostend and Dover, 25 August 1858

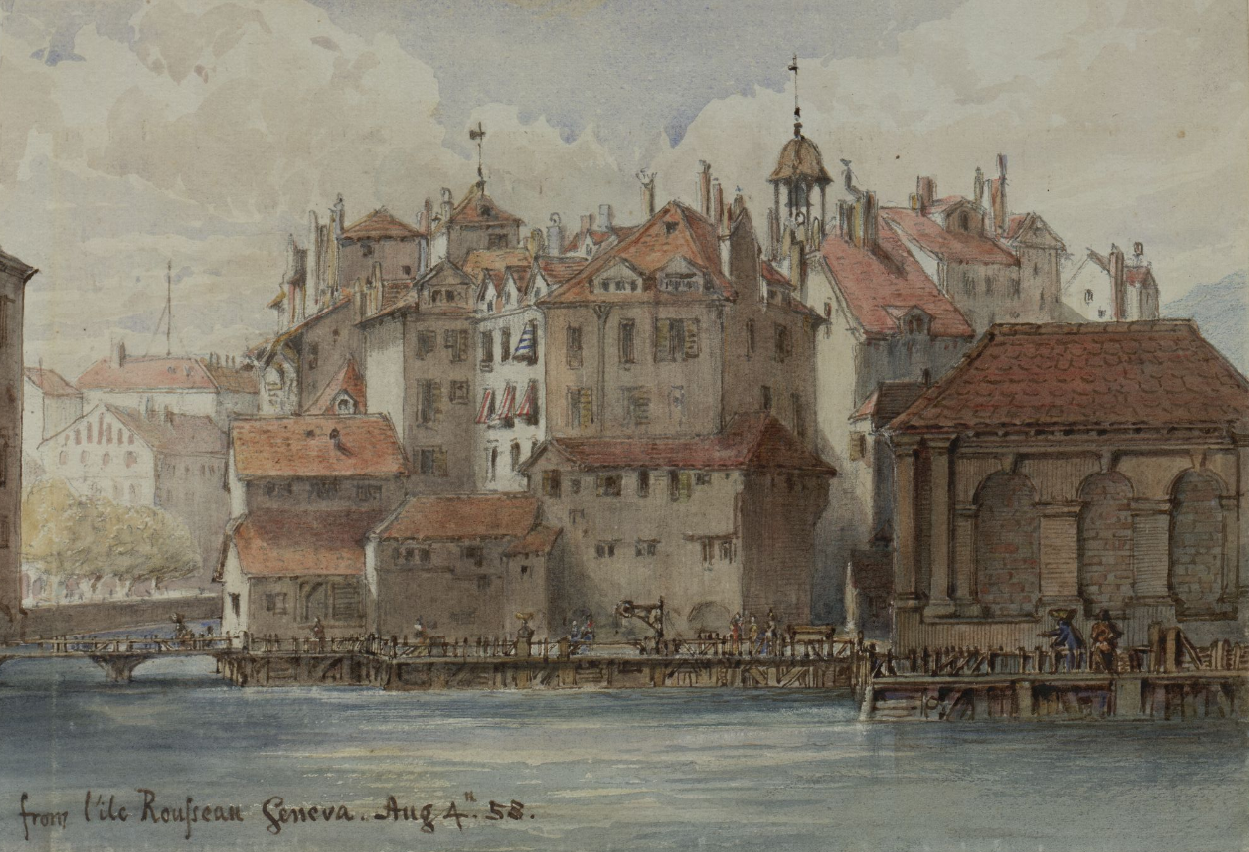
Geneva, 4 August 1858. Painted by Frances Elizabeth Wynne

== Family ==
Wynne was the youngest child of Charles Griffith-Wynne who owned the Voelas and Cefn Amlwch estates in Denbighshire. The family were descended from a cadet branch of the Earls of Aylesford. Frances' older sister Charlotte married John Robert Godley and is notable for her letter writing and community leadership in the colony of New Zealand. Frances Elizabeth never married and died in 1907.

== Sketch books ==
Frances Elizabeth travelled widely with her family in England, Wales and on the European tour circuit. She was a prolific amateur artist and about 1850 images dated 1854–1901 survive in the collections of the National Library of Wales. Her sketches ranged from fantasy art and satirical observations to classic portraiture. The collection includes a sketch of Queen Victoria at the opera in 1857 with King Leopold I and other European royalty.

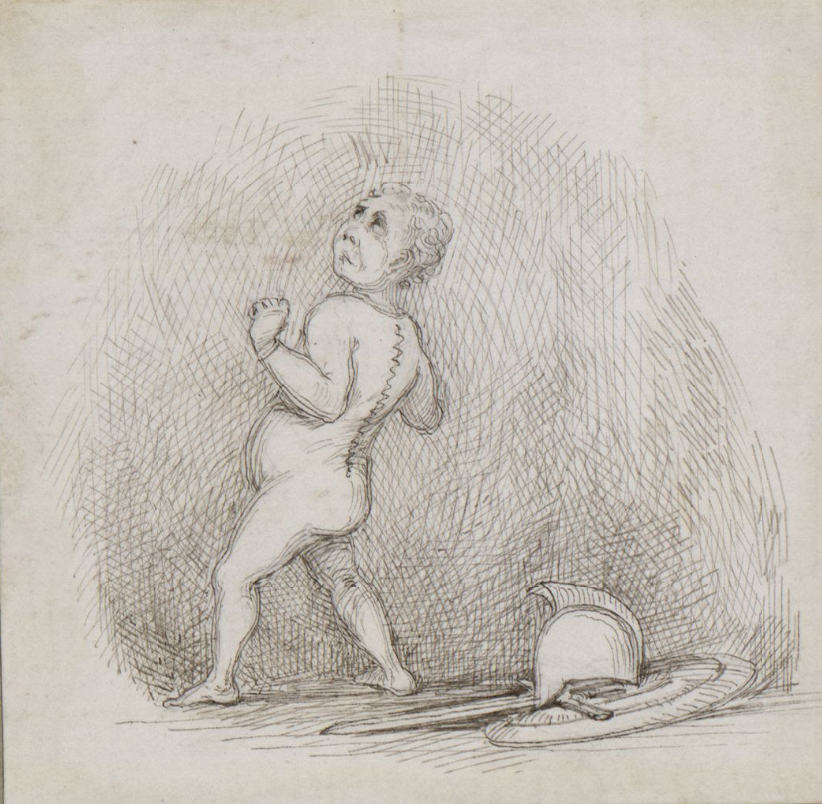
DV307 no.104 Commadore Nutt as 'Ajaz defying the thunder' 12 December 1864

== Gallery ==
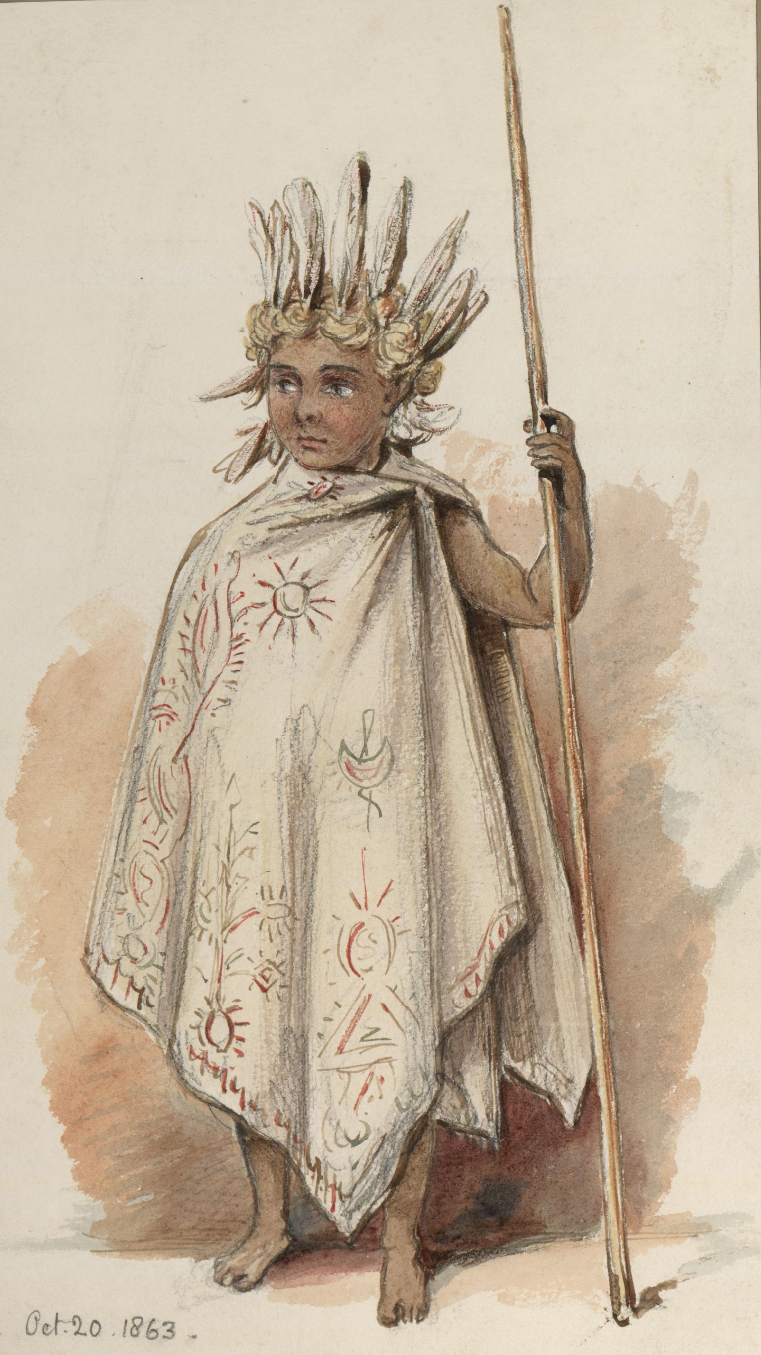
Margaret en Maori - A study of a female in supposed Maori dress, Frances Elizabeth Wynne, 1863

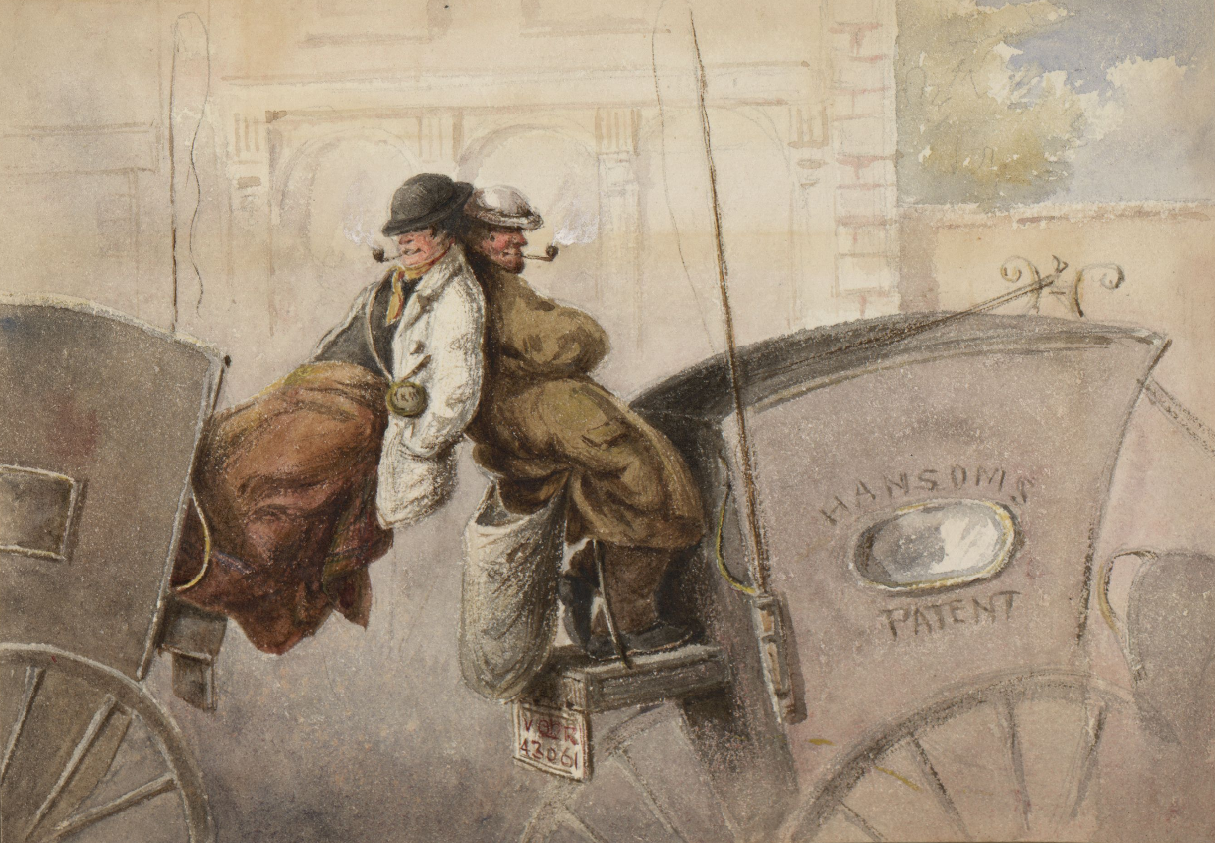
Coachmen taking a break, 1865

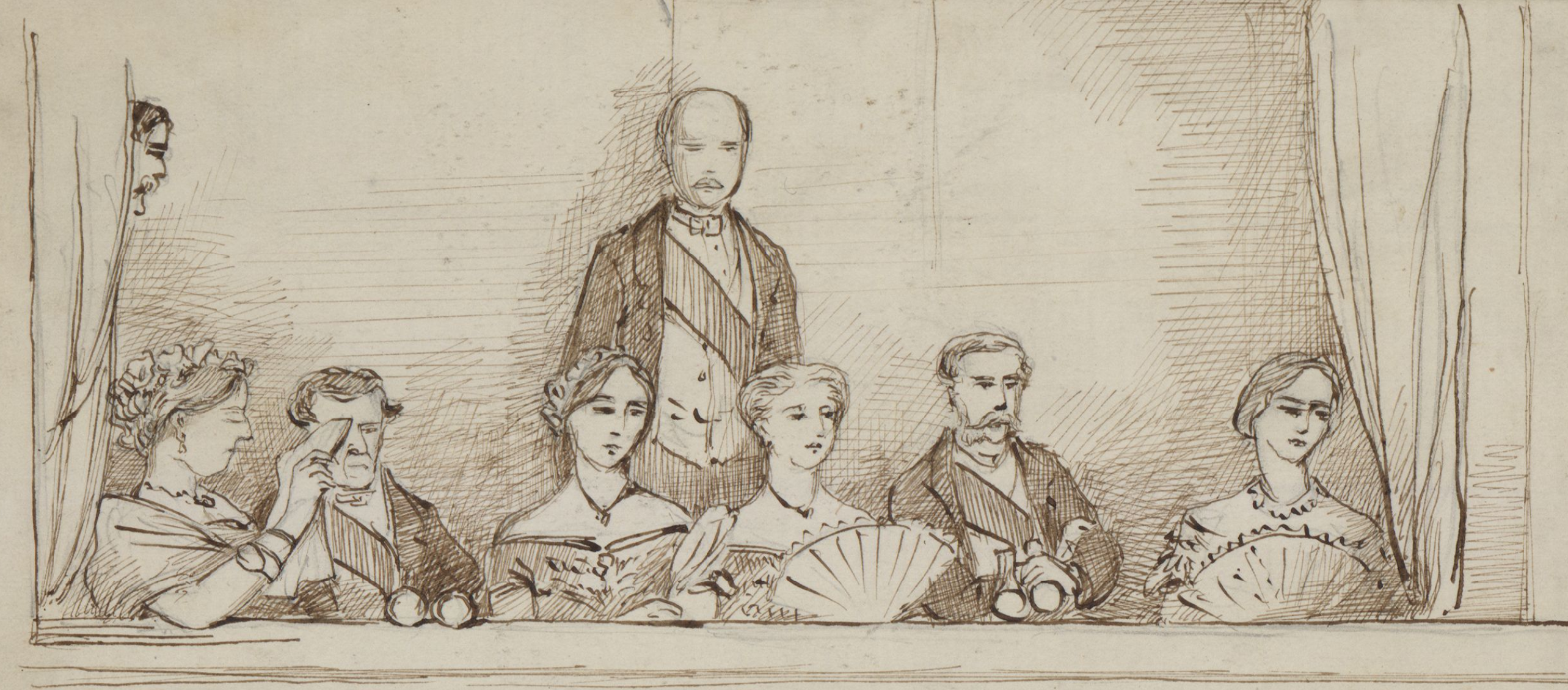
Queen Victoria and other royals watching Fra Diavolo, July 1857

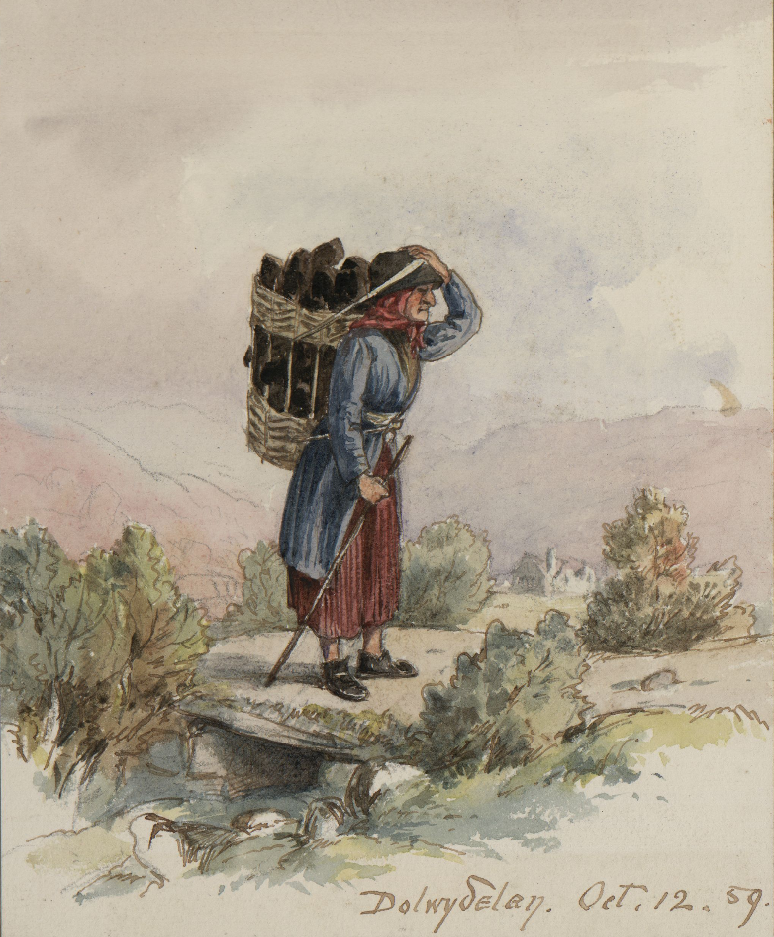
Welsh lady carrying coal, 1859

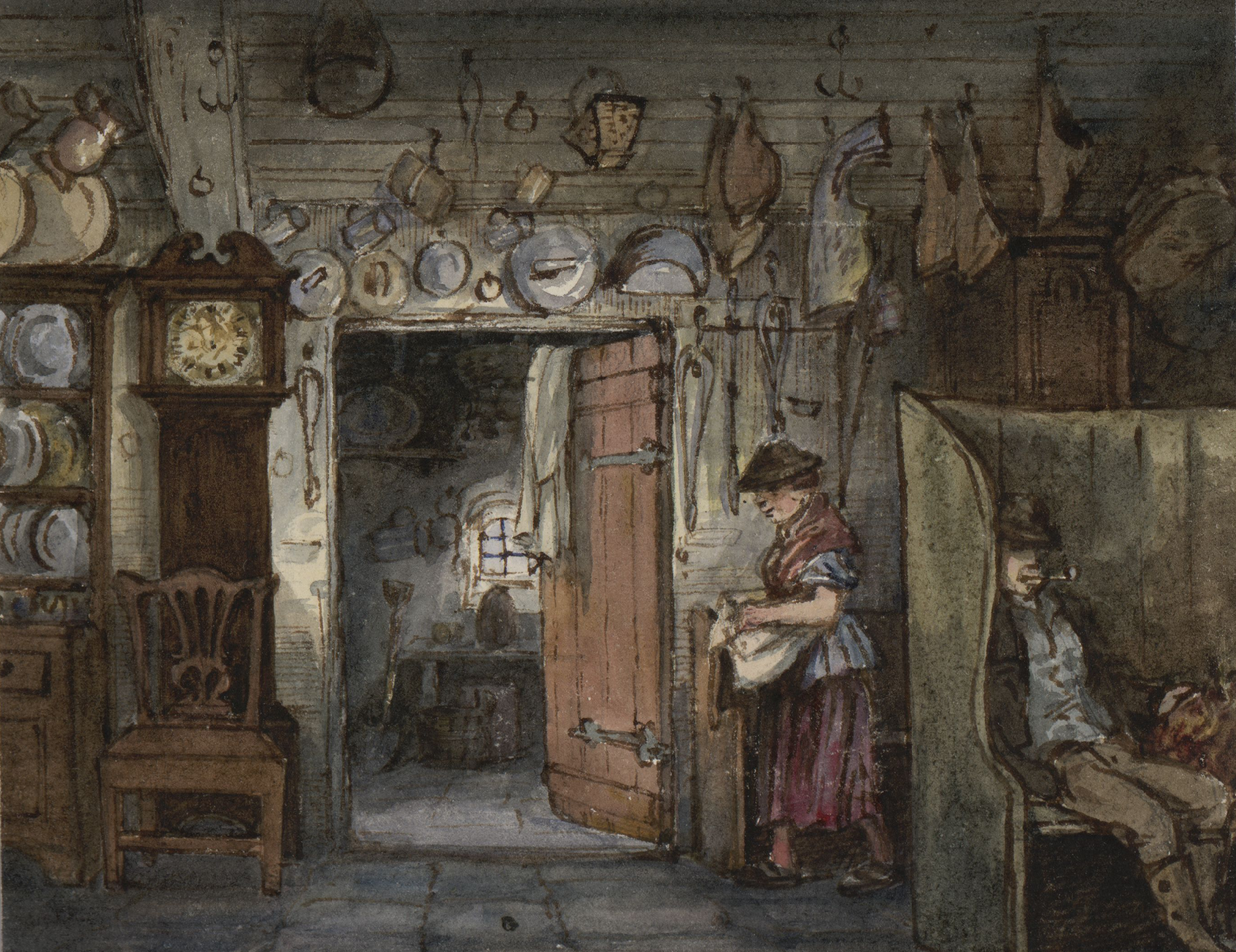
Inside a Welsh farmhouse (between 1854 and 1864)

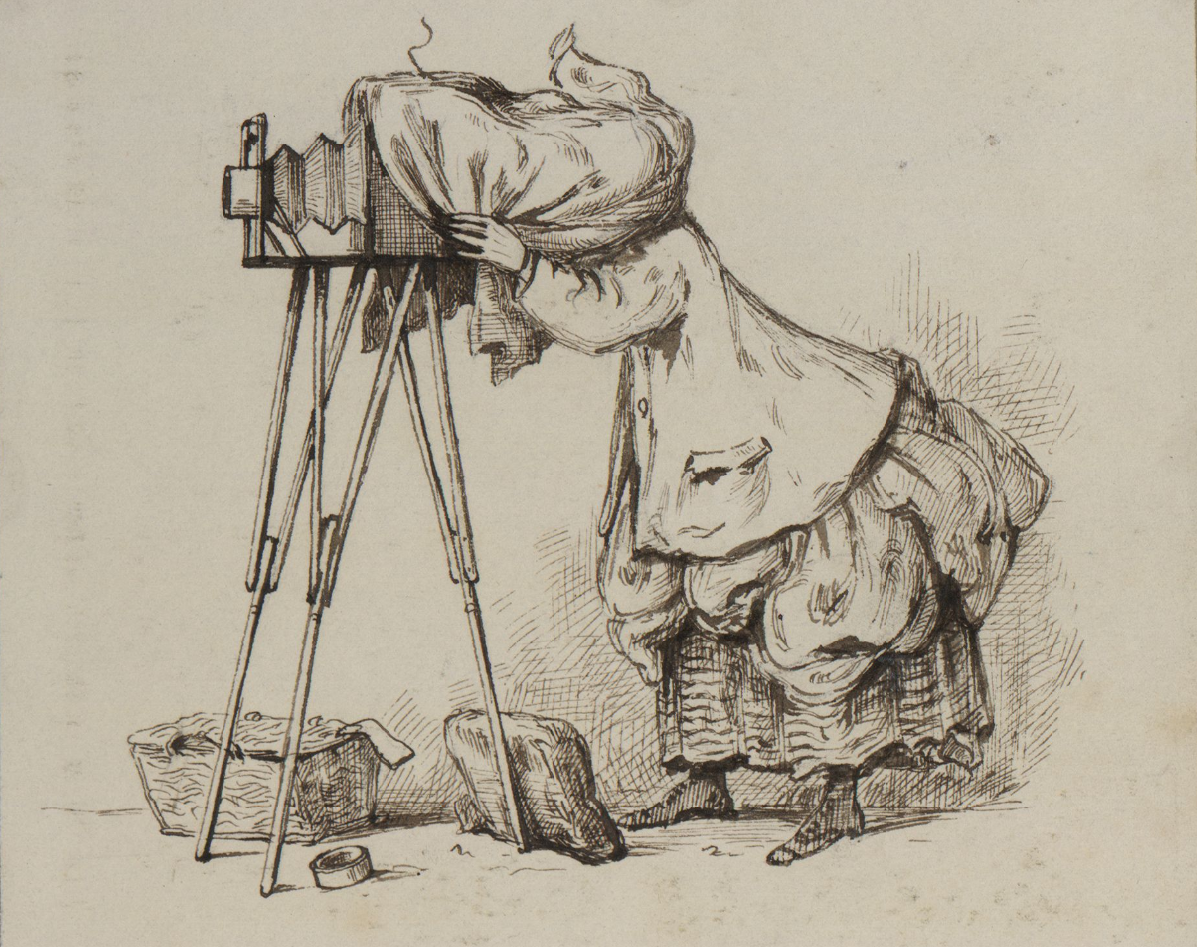
(between 1854 and 1864)

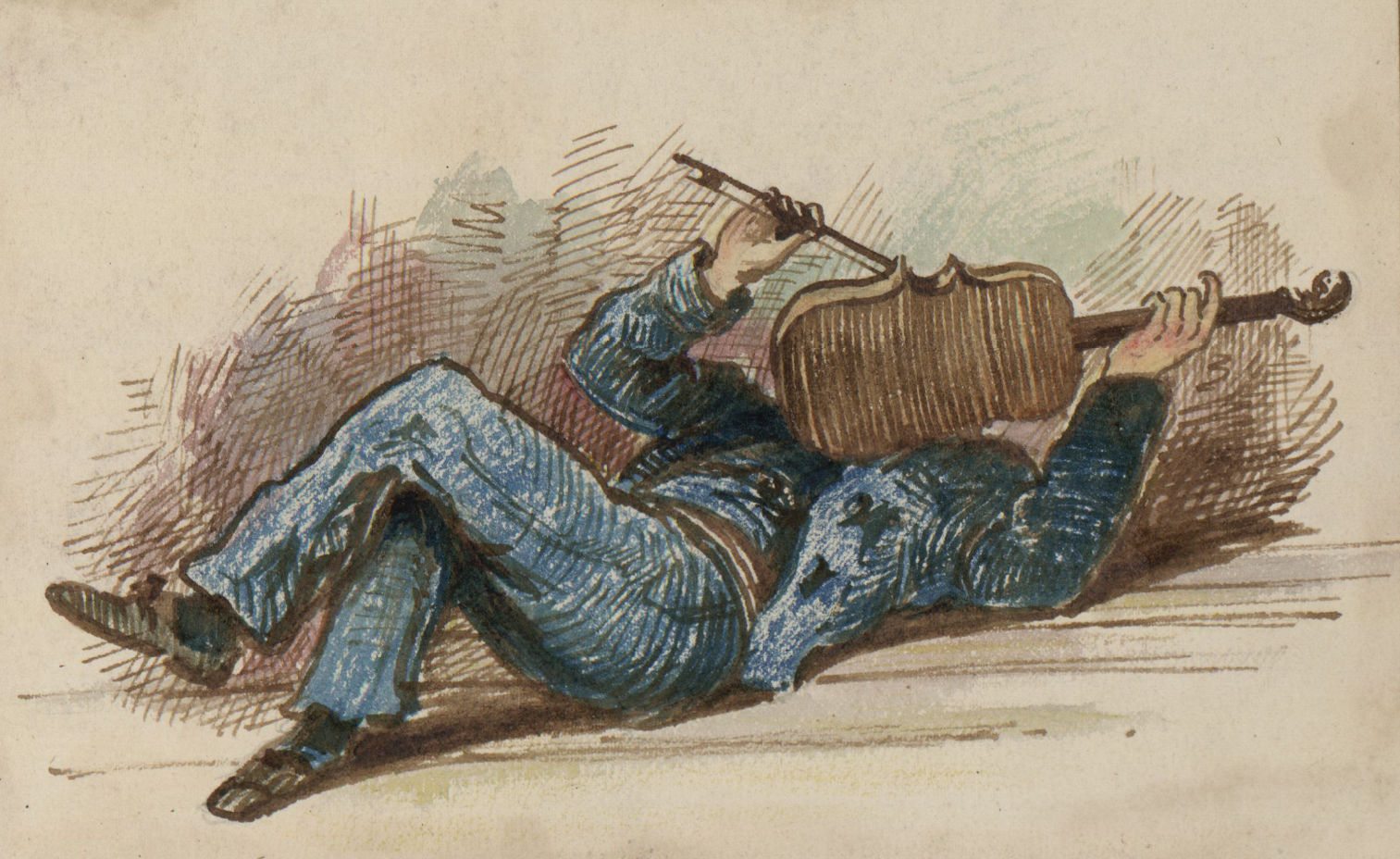
(between 1854 and 1864)

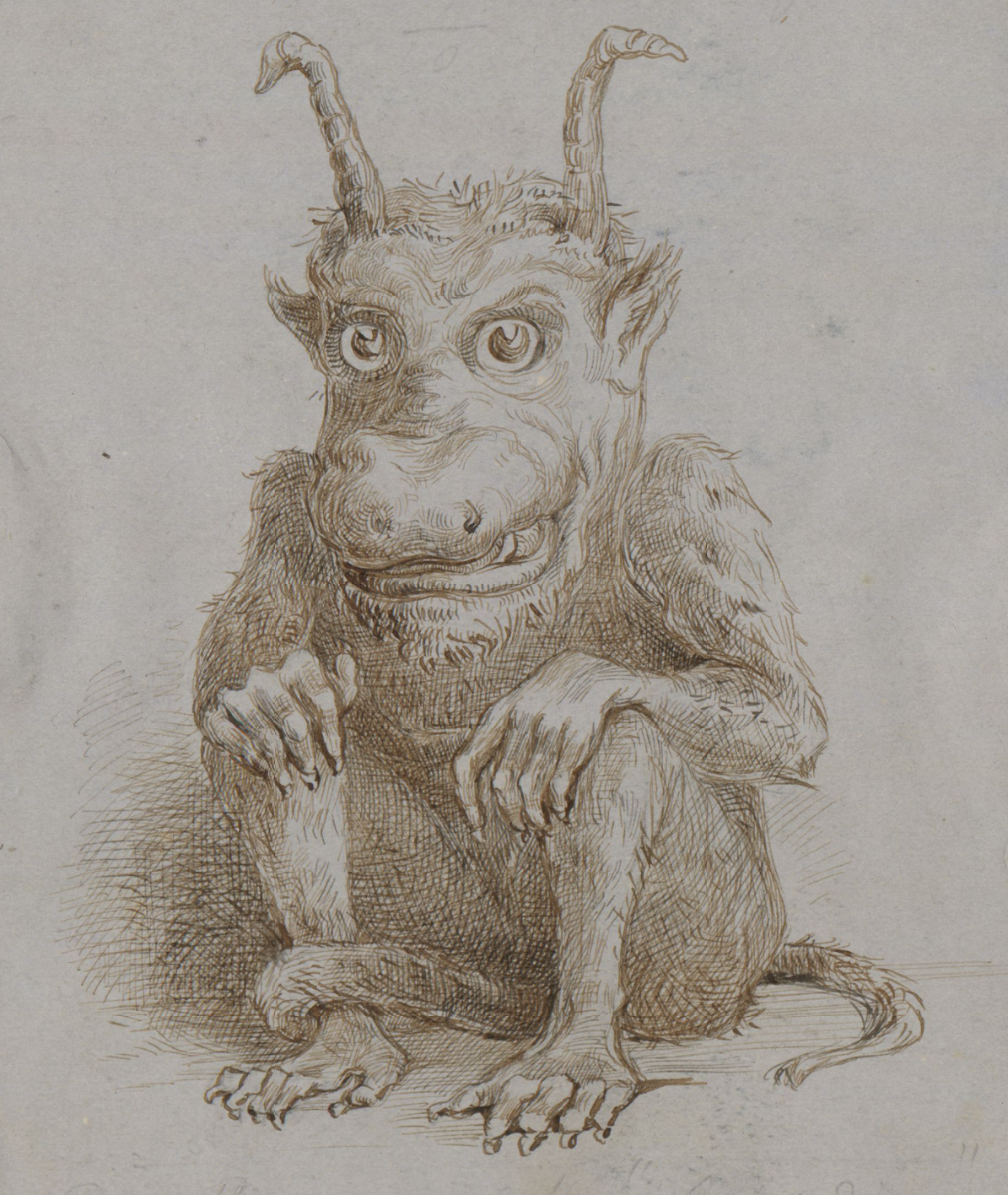
(between 1854 and 1864)

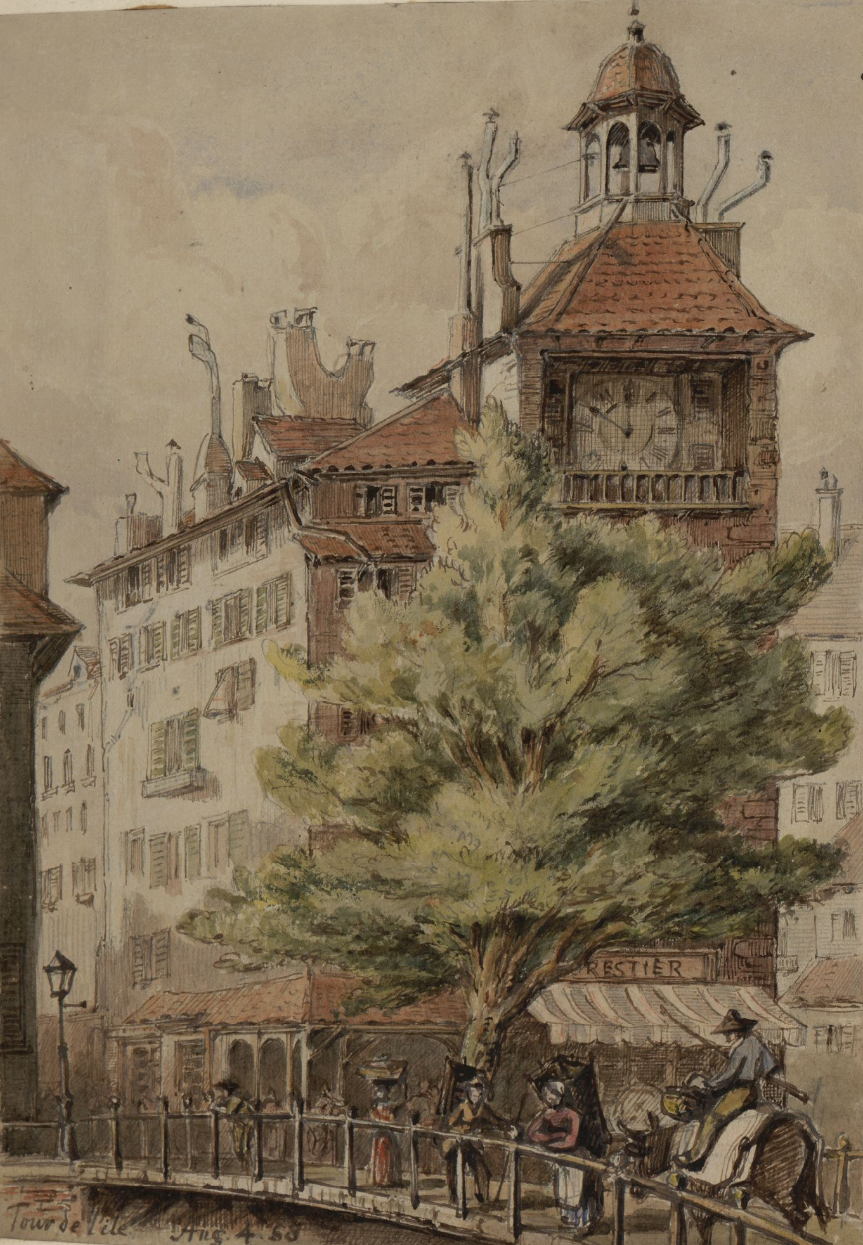
(between 1854 and 1864)

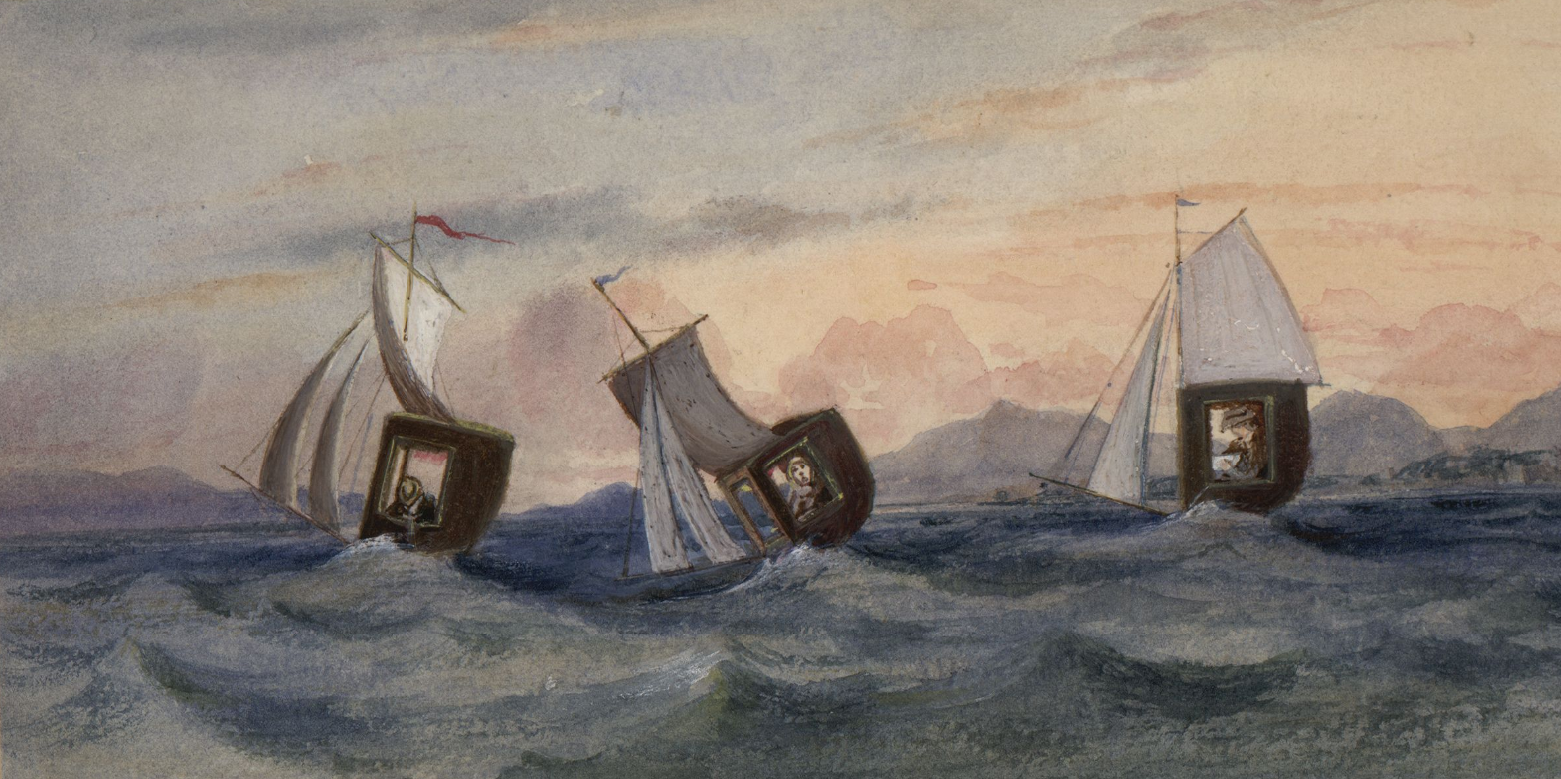
(between 1854 and 1864)

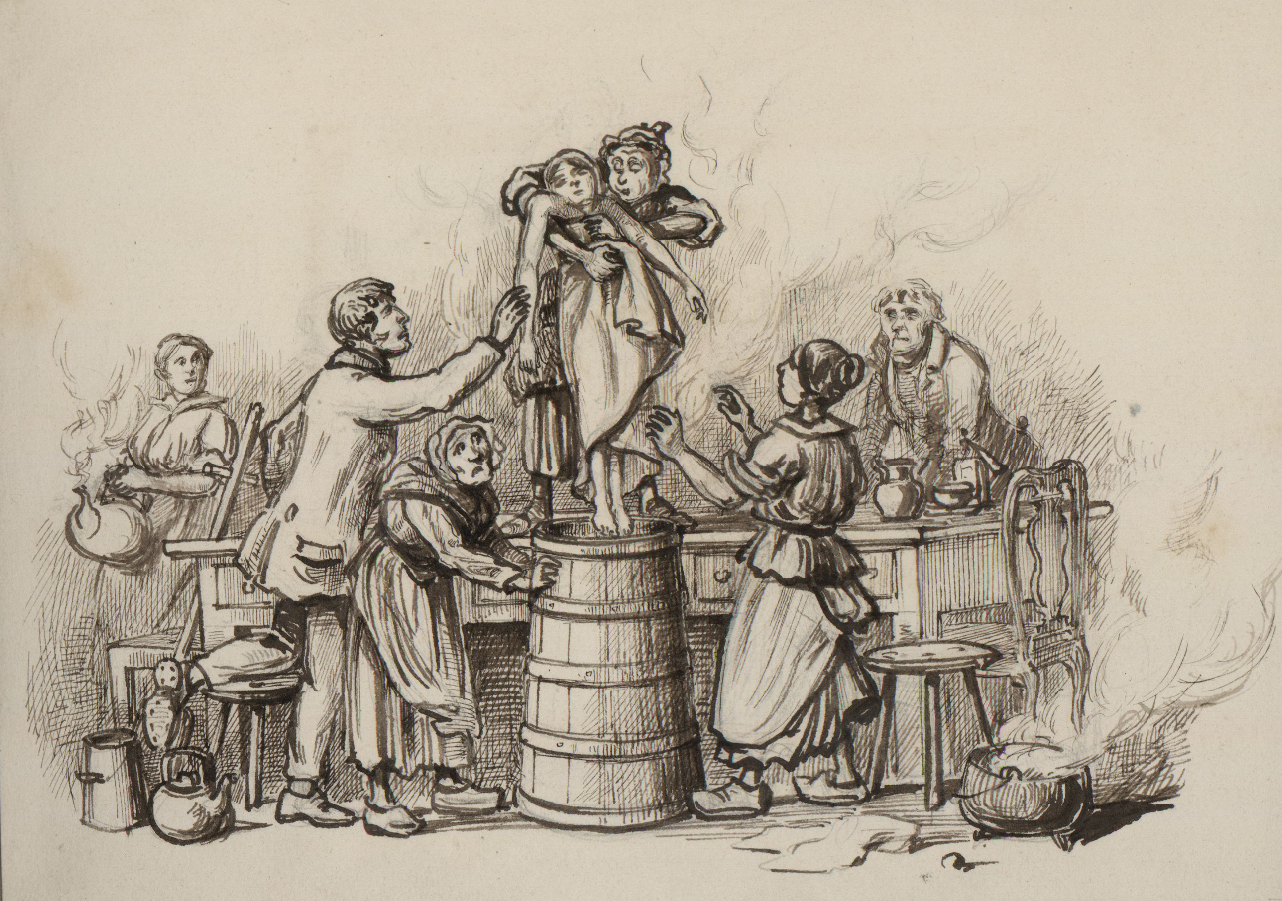
The warm bath, 1864
