= John Godley =

John Godley may refer to:

- John Robert Godley, Anglo-Irish statesman and bureaucrat, considered to be the founder of Canterbury, New Zealand
- John Godley, 3rd Baron Kilbracken, British-born peer, wartime naval pilot, journalist, author and farmer
