= James Townsend (New Zealand settler) =

English cricketer and New Zealand settler

James Townsend (c. 1790 – 12 August 1866) was an English wine merchant, who in later life was a pioneer settler in New Zealand's South Island. He was also an amateur cricketer.

== Life ==
Townsend was born in 1788. or 1790/1. He played from 1821 to 1831. As a cricketer, he was mainly associated with Marylebone Cricket Club (MCC), of which he was a member. He made nine known appearances in important matches including four for the Gentlemen. He was in business as a wine merchant, and was known for his interest in music.

In the 1841 census, Townsend and much of his family were recorded as resident in the civil parish of St Pancras, London. A purchaser of land in the Canterbury settlement, Townsend was listed with the address 21 Evershall Street, Mornington Crescent. A James Townsend, in the wine trade, from this area of north London, was being pursued by creditors in 1847, as reported in the London Gazette. He was in prison for debt in 1848.

=== Settler ===
The Townsend family, with four sons and six daughters, voyaged to New Zealand as settlers in 1850 on one of the First Four Ships, the Cressy. He was on the initial committee of the Canterbury Association, with Felix Wakefield and others. He also took part in the Zoological Committee of the settlement, raising funds in London for the importation of native British species. A high opinion of his trustworthiness was held by Jerningham Wakefield, who communicated it to John Robert Godley.

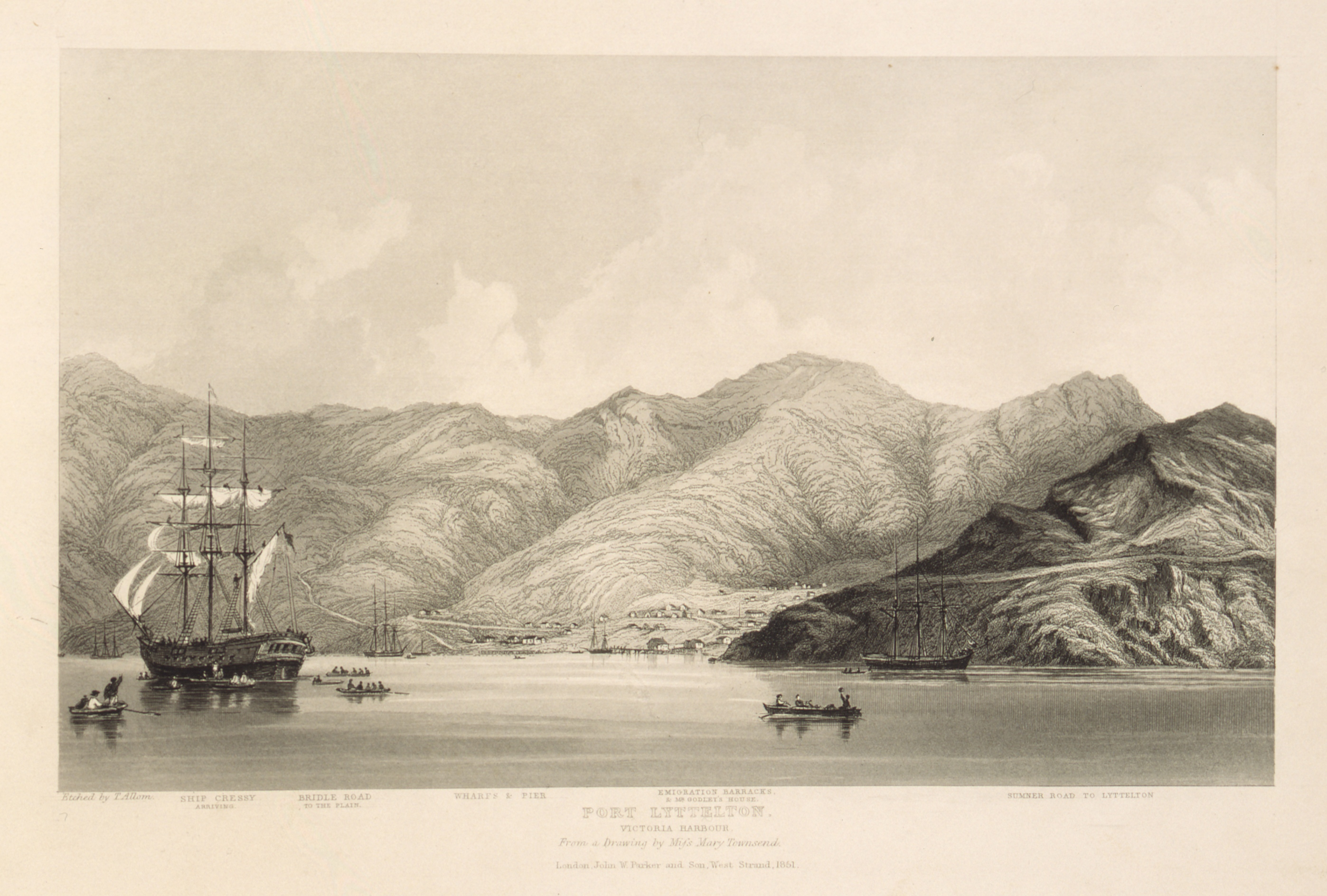
Port Lyttelton, 1850, by Mary Townsend

The Townsend family "formed one of the most popular and colourful groups in early Christchurch." In 1851 Townsend built a homestead, Ferrymead House, in what is now Ferrymead. It was described as "a fine house, with parallel twin gables, seven rooms, tōtara exterior walls lined with Tasmanian timber"; and went to the family of William Reeves. Townsend advertised his farm at Ferrymead for sale in 1853 but it did not sell.

The Townsends moved in 1856 to Rangiora. In 1859 the Rangiora Cricket Club was formed. One team of the time was notable for having nine out of eleven players connected to the Townsend family. In 1860 Townsend put up his farm and its stock, at Southbrook, for public auction.

== Family ==
Townsend married in 1820 Alicia Burges, daughter of Capt. Henry Burges of the East India Company. According to a note to the Journal of Edward Ward, the six daughters on the Cressy were aged in 1850 from 13 to 25. They were:

- Alicia, third daughter, married 1851 Charles Torlesse
- Mary Townsend, married 1851 Dr William Donald
- Frances, married 1855 William John Warburton Hamilton
- Marcia, married 1857 Hamilton Ward
- Margaret, married 1857 Crosbie Ward
- Priscilla, fourth daughter, married John Cowell Boys; he lived at Southbrook, worked as a surveyor, and married three times in all.

The youngest son was Robert (1832–1886) of Akaroa, who married Jane Dicken in 1865. One of the sons did not come to New Zealand; Margaret Ward met this brother in Panama in 1867 where he was an officer on HMS Scout.

Townsend retired to Lyttelton and died there on 12 August 1866 at age 78. He was buried at Lyttelton Anglican Cemetery. His wife died at Lyttelton on 5 February 1872 at age 75.

== Bibliography ==
- Haygarth, Arthur (1862). Scores & Biographies, volume 1 & 2 (1744–1840). Lillywhite.
