= Edward Wynne-Finch =

Welsh cricketer and barrister

Personal information
- Full name: Edward Heneage Wynne-Finch
- Born: 9 December 1842; Pentrefoelas, Denbighshire, Wales
- Died: 7 January 1914 (aged 71); Stokesley, Yorkshire, England
- Nickname: Charles Wynne (father); John Wynne (uncle)
- Batting: Right-handed
- Bowling: Right-arm off break

Domestic team information
- Years: Team
- 1864–1866: Marylebone Cricket Club

Career statistics
Competition	First-class
Matches	3
Runs scored	24
Batting average	4.80
100s/50s	–/–
Top score	20
Balls bowled	164
Wickets	2
Bowling average	38.00
5 wickets in innings	–
10 wickets in match	–
Best bowling	2/68
Catches/stumpings	–/–
- Source: Cricinfo, 8 May 2021

Edward Heneage Wynne-Finch (born Edward Heneage Wynne) JP (9 December 1842 – 7 January 1914) was a Welsh first-class cricketer and barrister.

The son of the cricketer and politician Charles Wynne, he was born in December 1842 at Voelas Hall near Pentrefoelas, Denbighshire. He was educated at Eton College, before going up to Trinity College, Cambridge. He played first-class cricket for the Marylebone Cricket Club on three occasions in 1864 and 1866, playing twice against Cambridge University in 1864 and against the Surrey Club in 1866 at The Oval. He scored 20 runs in his three first-class matches, in addition to taking 2 wickets with his right-arm off break bowling.

A student of the Inner Temple, Wynne became a barrister after graduating from Cambridge and was called to the bar in 1868. He later added the additional surname of Finch to his surname. He held the office of justice of the peace for both Denbighshire and the North Riding of Yorkshire. Wynne-Finch died in January 1914 at Stokesley Manor in Stokesley, North Yorkshire. His uncle, John Wynne, was also a first-class cricketer, while his aunt was Charlotte Godley, a community leader in New Zealand.
