= Charles Wynne =

Welsh politician (1815–1874)

Member of Parliament for Caernarfon
- In office 1859-1865

Personal details
- Born: 14 August 1815 London, England
- Died: 3 March 1874 (aged 58) Paris, France
- Spouse(s): Laura Pollen (m. 1840; died 1851) Jamesina Le Strang (m. 1963)
- Children: 1+, including Edward
- Parent: Charles Griffith-Wynne (father)
- Relatives: Charlotte Griffith-Wynne (sister); Frances Wynne (sister); John Wynne (brother); Charles Finch (grandfather)
- Education: Christ Church, Oxford

Charles Griffith Wynne (14 August 1815 – 3 March 1874), later known as Charles Wynne-Finch, was a Liberal Tory politician and a Member of Parliament for Caernarfon.

== Early life ==
Wynne was born in London in 1815. He was the oldest son of Charles Griffith-Wynne, MP for Caernarvonshire (1830–1832) and his wife, Sarah Hildyard, the daughter of Rev. Henry Hildyard. His paternal grandfather was the MP Charles Finch. He received his education at Eton and at Christ Church, Oxford, from where he graduated with a BA in 1837. He also represented the university at cricket, playing two matches for the Oxford University cricket team.

== Career ==
Wynne joined the Canterbury Association on 25 October 1849, and on 8 November of that year joined the management committee. Together with James FitzGerald, he applied pressure on John Hutt on 26 March 1850 to straighten out the affairs of the association, which caused Hutt to resign three days later. Wynne was member of the Caernarfon constituency from the 1859 general election to the 1865 general election. He was High Sheriff of Denbighshire in 1869.

== Family and death ==
Wynne's sister, Charlotte Griffith-Wynne, married John Robert Godley in September 1846, who later came to be regarded as the founder of Canterbury in New Zealand. On 15 June 1840, Wynne had married Laura Susan Pollen, the daughter of Richard Pollen (1786–1838) and Anne Cockerell. His wife died on 7 March 1851. He remarried in 1863 to Jamesina Joyce Ellen Styleman Le Strang, the widow of Henry L'Estrange Styleman Le Strange (d. 1862). She was the daughter of John Stewart (MP). His brother, John Wynne, also played first-class cricket, as did his son Edward.

He died on 3 March 1874 at 4 Rue Solferino, Paris, France. His estate was probated at £35,000.

Parliament of the United Kingdom
| Preceded by William Bulkeley Hughes | Member of Parliament for Caernarfon; 1859–1865 | Succeeded by William Bulkeley Hughes |
