= Lodge of Unanimity No 3 =

Masonic lodge in Lyttelton, New Zealand

- Interactive map of the Lodge of Unanimity No 3 area

General information
- Architectural style: Gothic Revival architecture
- Location: 6 St Davids Street and Sumner Road, Lyttelton, New Zealand
- Coordinates: 43.60392°S 172.72398°E
- Construction started: February 1876
- Inaugurated: 27 July 1876

Design and construction
- Architect: Benjamin Mountfort

Heritage New Zealand – Category 2
- Designated: 13 December 1996
- Reference no.: 7382

The Lodge of Unanimity No 3 is a historic Masonic lodge in Lyttelton, New Zealand.

Freemasonry was a feature of life in Lyttelton as early as 1851, when a meeting was held to establish a lodge. The warrant for the Lodge of Unanimity arrived from England in 1853, making it the first in the South Island and only the third in New Zealand. It was initially lodge No. 879. The first meeting of the lodge happened on 26 May 1853 at the storeroom of Augustus Alport, who was the local auctioneer and a brother of the lodge. The first lodge building began construction in 1855 and opened in 1858; it was demolished in 1876. Prominent local doctor and magistrate William Donald was a founding member of the lodge, and later became Grandmaster of the Canterbury Region.

The second lodge building was constructed on the same site in 1876. The design is a simple interpretation of the Gothic Revival movement, designed by Benjamin Mountfort, who was a lodge member and also designed the first lodge building. The building was extended with a timber refrectory in 1896, to a design by Mountfort's son Cyril. The building interior was ornately decorated in the style typical of Masonic lodges, including symbolic imagery. The wooden interior is made from kauri.

The lodge building was listed as a Category II Historic Place by Heritage New Zealand in 1997. The lodge building was badly damaged during the 2011 Christchurch earthquakes.
