= Charlotte Godley =

New Zealand letter-writer, community leader

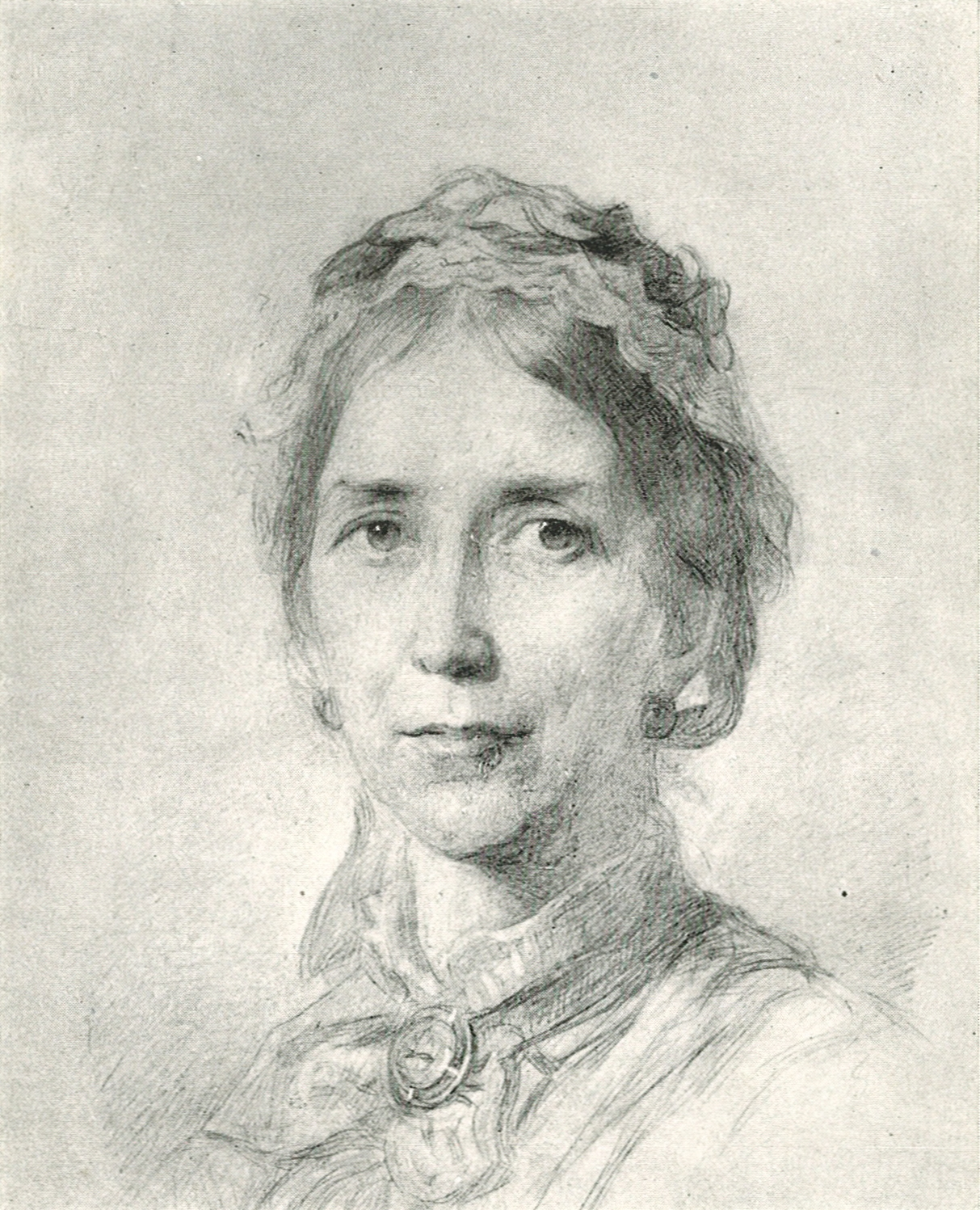
- Sketch of Charlotte Godley (1877)
- Born: 14 November 1821; Pentrefoelas, Denbighshire, Wales
- Died: 3 January 1907 (aged 85); London, England
- Known for: Community leader; letter writer
- Spouse: John Robert Godley
- Children: Arthur Godley, 1st Baron Kilbracken
- Parent: Charles Griffith-Wynne (father)
- Relatives: Charles Finch (grandfather); A. D. Godley (nephew); Alexander Godley (nephew); Charles Wynne (brother); Frances Elizabeth Wynne (sister); Hugh Godley, 2nd Baron Kilbracken (grandson)

Charlotte Godley (14 November 1821 – 3 January 1907) was a New Zealand letter-writer and community leader.

== Family ==
She was born as Charlotte Griffith-Wynne in Voelas House (subsequently demolished) in Denbighshire, Wales in 1821. She was the daughter of Charles Griffith-Wynne, MP for Caernarvonshire (1830–1832) and his wife, Sarah Hildyard, the daughter of Rev. Henry Hildyard. Charles Wynne was her brother.

== Marriage and New Zealand ==
Her marriage to John Robert Godley was registered in Llanrwst, Wales in the late summer of 1846. They had four daughters: Rose (born in New Zealand shortly before they left), Eleanor, Mary, and Margaret; the three younger girls were born in England after 1853. The only son was Sir Arthur Godley, later created Baron Kilbracken.

The Godleys, including their son Arthur and nursemaid Mary Powles, sailed for New Zealand aboard the Lady Nugent, departing Plymouth Sound on 13 December 1849, and arrived in Port Chalmers, Otago on 25 March 1850.

After spending a fortnight in Dunedin Harbour the ship sailed for Port Cooper (Lyttelton Harbour) and dropped anchor off Lyttelton on the morning of 12 April 1850. That day while her husband and Captain Thomas, the Canterbury Association Chief Surveyor road over the Port Hills to Christchurch and the Dean's farm at Riccarton, Charlotte also went ashore and found comfortable emigration barracks already built and their own house almost completed. She also persuaded another passenger, who had already been up to the top of the ridge, to show her the path to the summit so she, too, could see the plains beyond. On the 13th they again went ashore to inspect the road being built from Lyttelton to Christchurch via Sumner and, in the evening, went shopping in Lyttelton. The ship sailed for Wellington late on the morning of the 14th and was at first becalmed and then encountered a gale that meant it took over a week to sail to Wellington, (a journey that could take a day in favourable winds) arriving on 22 April 1850.

The Godley family, leaving their servants behind to finish packing up the Wellington house, sailed from Wellington on 28 November 1850 aboard the survey steamship HMS Acheron, arriving back in Lyttelton Harbour late in the afternoon of the 29th. This including the ship stopping to take soundings off the coast during the journey. They came ashore on 30 November 1850 and had to resolve a workers strike. Between 4 and 11 December they went on a trip to Harewood Forest (now Oxford), camping there for the weekend. On the 13th Governor and Lady Grey arrived in the government ship Fly and then on the 15th their servants arrived from Wellington. On the morning of 16 December 1850, the first of the emigrant ships, the Charlotte Jane arrived, followed by two more ships from England, Randolph and Sir George Seymour spaced apart and in the order they had sailed from Plymouth.

The Godley's residence at Lyttelton was a six-room wooden cottage where she hosted visitors including the Rev. Thomas Jackson. They left in late 1852. While in Wellington, Lyttelton, and Riccarton, Mrs. Godley wrote letters home to her mother in Wales, which were published much later (posthumously) as Letters from Early New Zealand. The letters described Māori customs, local fashion, earthquakes, society ways in Dunedin, and details of meals, household management, and the climate.

== Later life ==
Charlotte Godley was widowed in 1861, and died more than forty years later, in London, age 85. Arthur Godley's daughter Eveline wrote a remembrance of Charlotte Godley, included in the private 1936 edition of her grandmother's letters.
