= John Godley, 3rd Baron Kilbracken =

British peer and writer

- Born: 17 October 1920; Belgravia, London, England
- Died: 14 August 2006 (aged 85); Cavan, County Cavan, Ireland
- Education: Balliol College, Oxford
- Spouse(s): Penelope Reyne (m. 1943; div. 1949) Susan Heazlewood (m. 1981; div. 1989)
- Children: 4, including Sean
- Father: Hugh Godley
- Relatives: Arthur Godley (grandfather)
- Military career
- Branch: Royal Navy
- Rank: Lieutenant Commander
- Unit: Fleet Air Arm
- Commands: 835 Naval Air Squadron; 714 Naval Air Squadron
- Conflicts: World War II
- Awards: Distinguished Service Medal (returned)

John Raymond Godley, 3rd Baron Kilbracken, DSC (17 October 1920 – 14 August 2006), was a British-born, later Irish-resident peer, wartime naval pilot, journalist, author and farmer. He was the son of The 2nd Baron Kilbracken; his grandfather, Arthur Godley, 1st Baron Kilbracken, was William Ewart Gladstone's private secretary. He became the third Baron Kilbracken on his father's death in October 1950, and became an active member of the House of Lords. After many years living in the Republic of Ireland, he renounced his British nationality and took up Irish citizenship in the 1970s, as a protest at British actions in Northern Ireland.

== Early and private life ==
Godley was born in Chester Street in Belgravia, and educated at Arnold House School in St John's Wood in London, followed by Eton College and Balliol College, Oxford, developing an interest in horse racing and betting at both latter places, and rowing in the first VIII at Eton and the university second boat, Isis, at Oxford. After serving in the Fleet Air Arm in the Second World War, he returned to his studies, and graduated with an MA in 1948.

He married twice. He married Penelope Anne Reyne in 1943. They had two children, Christopher (born 1 January 1945) and another son, who died aged three days. He and Penelope divorced in 1949.

In April 1951, he moved permanently to the family's estate, Killegar House, in Carrigallen, County Leitrim. His father's fortunes had not flourished and he had been forced by circumstances to put Killegar on the market. The house was dilapidated, and had not been occupied for several years but he was determined to live there. He farmed the estate organically from the 1950s.

His second marriage was to an Australian ex-spy and writer, Susan Lee Heazlewood, who was thirty-six years his junior, in 1981. They had one son, the Irish poet Sean Godley (born 1981), before divorcing in 1989.

He also had a daughter, Lisa.

He died in Cavan in August 2006.

== Wartime service ==
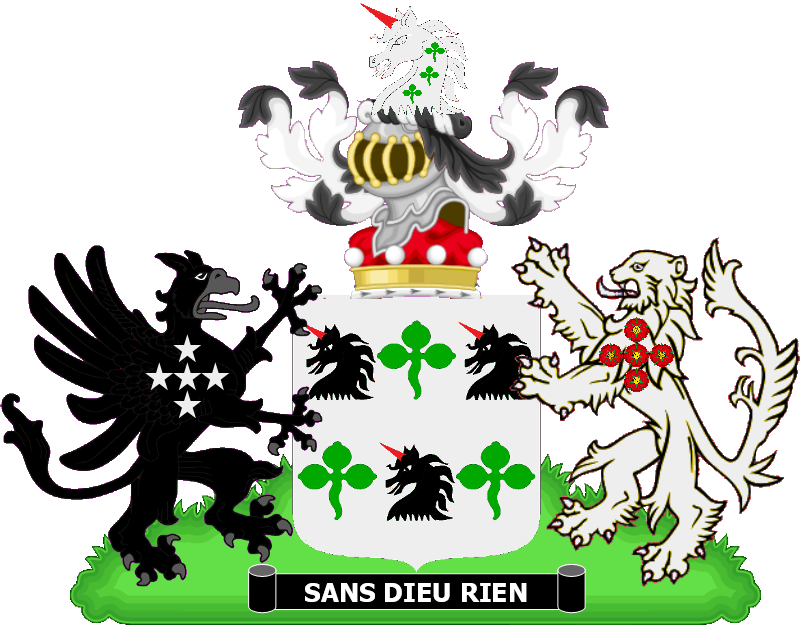
Achievement of arms

Having taken flying lessons while at school, when World War II broke out, he joined the Fleet Air Arm in 1940, mainly flying obsolescent Fairey Swordfish bombers (known as "stringbags") from merchant aircraft carriers, merchant ships with an added flight deck used to escort merchant convoys on the Atlantic. He was commissioned in 1941, and later commanded 'P' Flight of 836 Naval Air Squadron. He was promoted to lieutenant commander in 1944 and took command of 835 Naval Air Squadron. He was awarded the DSC for commanding the mixed Swordfish and Grumman Wildcat squadron from the escort carrier HMS Nairana in an attack on enemy shipping on 29 January 1945. He transferred to command of 714 Naval Air Squadron, ending the war flying a Fairey Barracuda.

== Post-war writing career ==
After finishing his studies, he considered joining the Foreign Service, but decided to become a journalist instead, working for the Daily Mirror from 1947 to 1949, the Daily Express from 1949 to 1951, and then freelance. He was originally as a racing correspondent and later mainly as a foreign correspondent in places including Aden, Angola, China, Cuba and Yemen. He wrote for many journals, including The New Yorker, Punch, Sports Illustrated, Reader's Digest and Good Housekeeping.

He also wrote several books under the name "John Godley", including Tell Me the Next One (1950), The Master Forger (1951, a biography of the Vermeer forger Han van Meegeren), Living Like a Lord (1955), A Peer Behind the Curtain (1959) and Shamrocks and Unicorns (1962), a second biography of the Vermeer forger Han van Meegeren (1967, under the name "Lord Kilbraken"), a war autobiography entitled Bring Back My Stringbag (1979), and The Easy Way to Bird Recognition (1982), which won an award and was followed up by The Easy Way to Tree Recognition (1983) and The Easy Way to Wild Flower Recognition (1984).

== Peerage ==
He succeeded his father as Baron Kilbracken in 1950, while visiting New Zealand to celebrate the centenary of the foundation of Christchurch and the province of Canterbury by his great-great-grandfather, John Robert Godley. He took his seat in the House of Lords, but rarely attended until he made his maiden speech in 1961. He became an active member in later years. Originally a Liberal, he moved to Labour in 1966.

As a resident in the Republic of Ireland, Lord Kilbracken returned his six military medals in 1972 as a result of British behaviour in Northern Ireland (variously attributed to the Bloody Sunday incident, or the British policy of internment). He also renounced his British nationality, taking up an Irish passport, but retaining his right to sit in the House of Lords until the reforms in 1999. He also campaigned on behalf of the Kurds, comparing the situation in Iraq with that in Northern Ireland.

Coat of arms of John Godley, 3rd Baron Kilbracken

Crest
A unicorn’s head erased Argent horned Gules charged with three trefoils slipped Vert.
Escutcheon
Argent three unicorns' heads erased Sable horned Gules two and one and three trefoils slipped Vert one and two.
Supporters
On the dexter side a gryphon Sable charged on the shoulder with four mullets in cross Argent on the sinister side a lion Argent charged on the shoulder with four roses also in cross Gules barbed and seeded Proper.
Motto
Sans Dieu Rien

Peerage of the United Kingdom
Preceded by Hugh Godley	Baron Kilbracken; 1950–2006	Succeeded by Christopher Godley
