= William Donald (doctor) =

New Zealand physician and public servant (1816–1884)

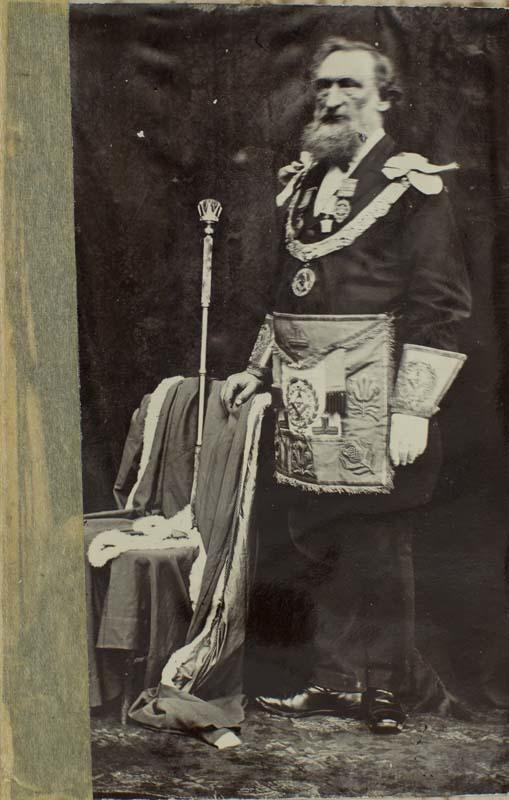
- Donald in Masonic regalia, c. 1868
- Born: 25 September 1816; London, England
- Died: 30 June 1884 (aged 68); Lyttelton, New Zealand
- Occupations: Physician; local politician
- Spouses: Mary Townsend (m. 1851; died 1869); Barbara Rose McDonald (m. 1873)

William Donald (25 September 1816 – 29 June 1884) was a British-born New Zealand medical doctor, public servant and politician. He was the first medical practitioner in Lyttelton, later becoming resident magistrate and chairman of the first municipal council.

== Biography ==
William Donald was born in London on 25 September 1816 to Scottish parents. His face was deeply pockmarked from a smallpox infection. He worked in Southwark and France after graduating as a doctor. He travelled to New Zealand in 1849 as the surgeon aboard the Cornwall, landing in Taranaki. He was sent to Canterbury by the New Zealand Company to act as medical support for the early surveyors of Canterbury in November 1849 at the request of Captain Thomas.

He settled in Lyttelton, and served many roles in public life. He was appointed Colonial Surgeon in January 1851, coroner in March 1851, registrar of births, deaths and marriages in 1855, surgeon to the Canterbury Volunteers in October 1860, and Port Health Officer in 1864. Between 1862 and 1865 he also served as the chairman of the first Municipal Council in Lyttelton. He was resident magistrate for 20 years between 1861 and 1881.

Donald was a notable Freemason, founding the Lodge of Unanimity No 3 and serving as the Grandmaster of the Canterbury Region from 1868 until a few months before his death. In this role he initiated William Rolleston as a Freemason on 3 June 1869. He was also a member of the Odd Fellows and the Foresters. He was active in the Anglican Church and known for his charity and good character.

Donald married twice: first to Mary Townsend on 20 November 1851 at Holy Trinity in Lyttelton; she died in 1869. In 1873 he remarried to Barbara Rose Macdonald.

Donald was medical officer to the Lyttelton Gaol in the 1860s, and was subject to criticism from prisoners in 1863, who wrote letters to the editor accusing him of "petty tyranny" for declining them beer. As magistrate, Donald also criticised the damp conditions of the gaol, and the treatment of prisoners.

Donald died in Lyttelton on 29 June 1884. Historian George Macdonald described him as the "uncrowned King of Lyttelton". A small street near the former Lyttelton Borough Council stables is named after him.
