= Charles Griffith-Wynne =

British Tory-leaning politician

Member of Parliament for Caernarvonshire
- In office 1830-1832

Personal details
- Born: 4 March 1780
- Died: 22 March 1865 (aged 85)
- Spouse: Sarah Hildyard (m. 1812)
- Children: 4+, including Charles, Charlotte, Frances and John
- Parent: Charles Finch (father)

Charles Wynn Griffith-Wynne (4 March 1780 – 22 March 1865), sometimes known more simply as Charles Griffith-Wynne, was a British Tory-leaning politician and, between 1830 and 1832, the Member of Parliament (MP) for Caernarvonshire in North Wales.

== Early life ==
Wynne was born in 1780, the son of the MP Charles Finch. and Jane Wynne who had married one another in 1778. The Wynne family had been producing members of parliament for Caernarvonshire since at least as far back as the mid-seventeenth century.

He received his education at Westminster School and at Brasenose College, Oxford, which he left at the end of 1797 after only about six months, possibly in connection with his parents' separation. He was later a fellow of All Souls College, Oxford between 1800 and 1812.

He took the names Griffith and Wynne by royal licence on 26 June 1804, almost certainly in order to inherit from his mother's family the Wynne family estates surrounding Voelas House (subsequently demolished) in Denbighshire.

== Career ==
He was politically active in the Caernarvonshire constituency from about 1825, and was elected unopposed as the constituency MP in 1830 when the king's death triggered a general election. He was considered a partisan of the Tory government, but was absent from the House of Commons when the government fell a few months later, in November 1830, over the civil list vote.

There is no record of his having made a speech in the House of Commons. His voting record in the struggle that marked the run up to the Reform Act 1832 was opposed to the reform agenda of the Whig government of Lord Grey. However, for much of the time he was absent due to illness, and he did not stand for election in the 1832 election, nor subsequently.

== Personal ==
Wynne married Sarah Hildyard in 1812. Their children included Charles Griffiths Wynne-Finch (1815–1874) and Charlotte Griffith-Wynne, better remembered in New Zealand as Charlotte Godley (1821–1907), the wife of John Robert Godley. His youngest daughter Frances Elizabeth Wynne was a keen amateur artist who toured Europe on several occasions. Another child included their son, John Wynne, who played first-class cricket. Griffith-Wynne became estranged from John in 1864, disinheriting him from his will.

Charles Wynn Griffith-Wynne died on 22 March 1865.

Parliament of the United Kingdom
Preceded by Sir Thomas Wynn	Member of Parliament for Caernarvonshire; 1830–1832	Succeeded by Thomas Assheton Smith
