= Baron Kilbracken =

Barony in the Peerage of the United Kingdom

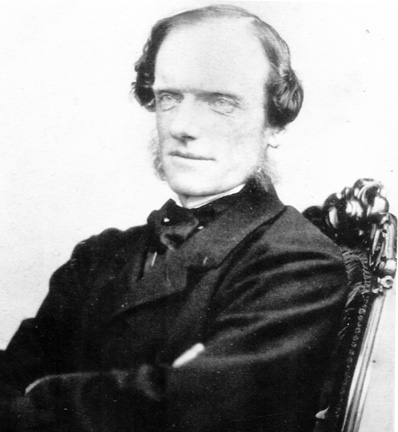
John Robert Godley, ancestor of the Barons Kilbracken.

Baron Kilbracken, of Killegar in the County of Leitrim, is a title in the Peerage of the United Kingdom. It was created in 1909 for the senior civil servant Sir Arthur Godley. He was Permanent Under-Secretary of State for India between 1883 and 1909. As of 2010 the title is held by his great-grandson, the fourth Baron, who succeeded his father in 2006.

John Robert Godley was the father of the first Baron. Another member of the Godley family was General Sir Alexander Godley. He was the first cousin of the first Baron.

== Barons Kilbracken (1909) ==
- Arthur Godley, 1st Baron Kilbracken (1847–1932)
- Hugh John Godley, 2nd Baron Kilbracken (1877–1950)
- John Raymond Godley, 3rd Baron Kilbracken (1920–2006)
- Christopher John Godley, 4th Baron Kilbracken (b. 1945)

The heir apparent is the present holder's son The Hon. James John Godley (b. 1972)

Coat of arms of Baron Kilbracken
Crest A unicorn’s head erased Argent horned Gules charged with three trefoils slipped Vert. Escutcheon Argent three unicorns' heads erased Sable horned Gules two and one and three trefoils slipped Vert one and two. Supporters On the dexter side a gryphon Sable charged on the shoulder with four mullets in cross Argent on the sinister side a lion Argent charged on the shoulder with four roses also in cross Gules barbed and seeded Proper. Motto Sans Dieu Rien
