= Hugh Godley, 2nd Baron Kilbracken =

Irish barrister and nobleman

- Born: 12 June 1877
- Died: 13 October 1950 (aged 73)
- Occupation: Lawyer
- Spouse: Elizabeth Hamilton
- Children: 1+, including John
- Father: Arthur Godley
- Relatives: Charlotte Godley (grandmother); John Robert Godley (grandfather)

Hugh John Godley, 2nd Baron Kilbracken (12 June 1877 – 13 October 1950) was an Irish barrister and nobleman from County Leitrim.

== Biography ==
Godley was educated as a lawyer, and was appointed a King's Counsel in January 1924. He became counsel to the Lord Chairman of Committees of the House of Lords.

Godley succeeded his father as the 2nd Baron Kilbracken in 1932, and he was married to Elizabeth Helen Monteith Hamilton.

As a lover of music and good friend of the pianist and composer Donald Tovey he was also a committee member in the London Classical Concert Society around 1913.

He was succeeded by his son John to the barony upon his death in 1950.

Coat of arms of Hugh Godley, 2nd Baron Kilbracken
Crest A unicorn’s head erased Argent horned Gules charged with three trefoils slipped Vert. Escutcheon Argent three unicorns’ heads erased Sable horned Gules two and one and three trefoils slipped Vert one and two. Supporters On the dexter side a gryphon Sable charged on the shoulder with four mullets in cross Argent on the sinister side a lion Argent charged on the shoulder with four roses also in cross Gules barbed and seeded Proper. Motto Sans Dieu Rien

Peerage of the United Kingdom
Preceded by John Arthur Godley	Baron Kilbracken; 1932–1950	Succeeded by John Raymond Godley
