= Statue of John Robert Godley =

Statue in Cathedral Square, Christchurch, New Zealand

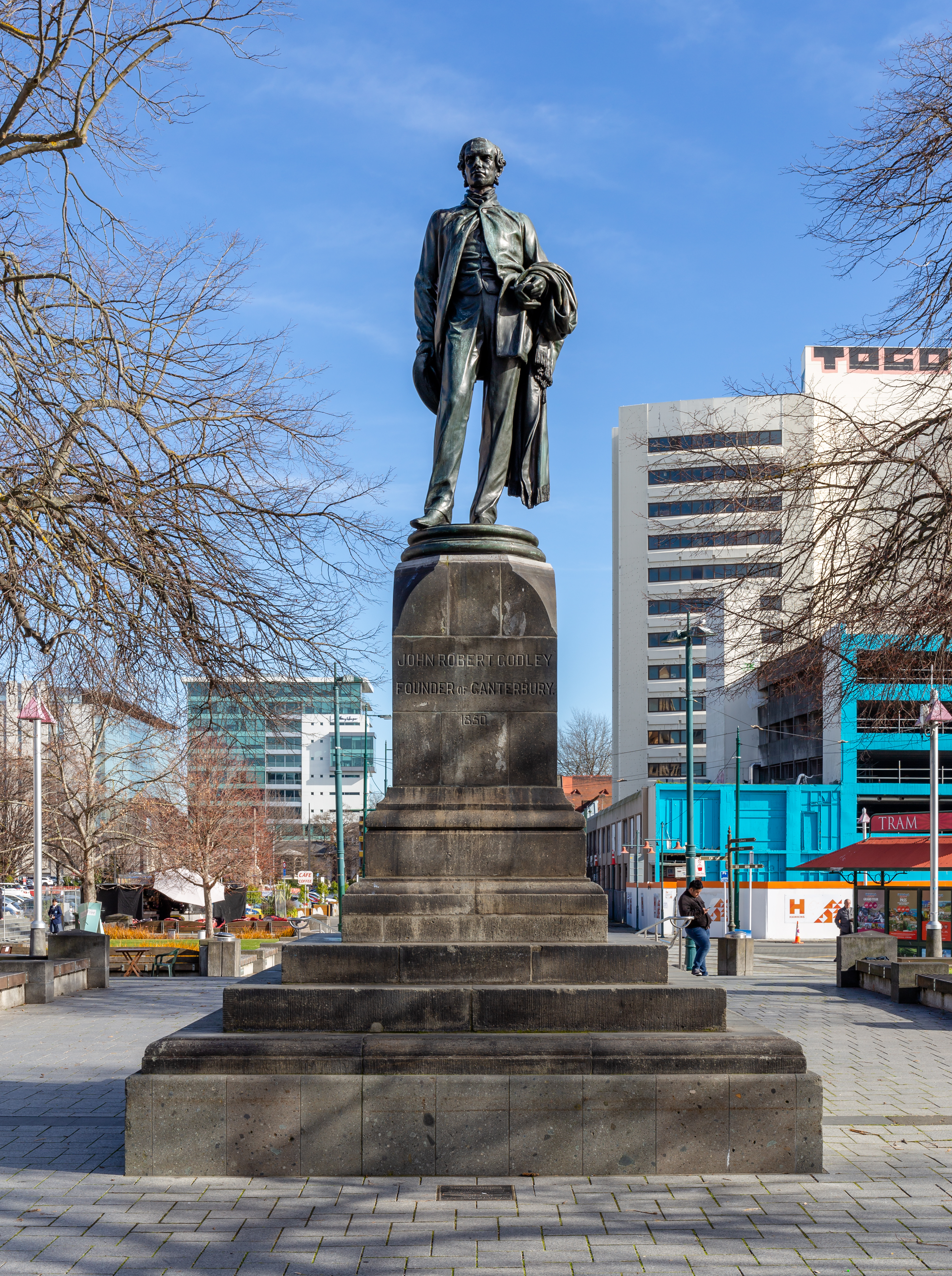
- Godley Statue in 2019

- Location within New Zealand
- Artist: Thomas Woolner
- Year: 1865
- Catalogue: 3666
- Medium: Bronze
- Subject: John Robert Godley
- Designation: Category I historic place
- Location: Cathedral Square, Christchurch; 43.53096°S 172.63599°E

The Godley Statue is a bronze statue situated in Cathedral Square in Christchurch, New Zealand. It commemorates the "Founder of Canterbury" John Robert Godley. It was the first statue portraying a person in New Zealand. The statue fell off its plinth in the February 2011 Christchurch earthquake and time capsules were discovered inside the plinth. It was four years before the statue was returned to its position.

== Context ==
In November 1847, Godley had a fruitful meeting with Edward Gibbon Wakefield over two days. The founding of the Canterbury Association was an outcome of this. He arrived in Lyttelton in April 1850, eight months before the first settlers arrived through the scheme of the Canterbury Association, and acted as the 'Resident Chief Agent'. Whilst he only stayed for two days before leaving for Wellington, he stopped expenditure to address mounting debt. Godley was back in the port town for the arrival of the First Four Ships, and was then in effect governor for the Canterbury settlement. He was outspoken, scrupulous and an accepted authority. He was a strong advocate for settler self-governance. He left the colony in December 1852, only two years after the settlers arrived.

== Statue ==
The Godley statue is located in Cathedral Square, the heart of Christchurch, to commemorate the "Founder of Canterbury".

The statue, by English sculptor Thomas Woolner, was cast in the Coalbrookdale foundry in Shropshire in 1865. It was unveiled by magistrate Charles Bowen in Cathedral Square on 8 August 1867. In 1904, a Christchurch City Councillor advocated for the statue to be moved, as the soon to be built trams would not leave enough space around it. In 1907, the City Council gave permission for the erection of a tram shelter to be built that completely hid the statue from view from the cathedral. In 1917, the situation was made worse by the construction of underground toilets right next to the statue. Finally, on 5 March 1918, the statue was shifted to a new position to the north of ChristChurch Cathedral.

The tram shelter was demolished in 1931 and the statue was moved back into its original location in April 1933 after the removal of some trees from this part of the square.

The statue fell over during the February 2011 Christchurch earthquake. In the following days time capsules were discovered beneath its plinth by a crane driver, one a damaged glass bottle containing a parchment and the other a sealed metal container. The two capsules were placed in the care of Canterbury Museum for examination and preservation. The time capsules were to be opened once the museum's lab was operating again sometime in April 2011.

Christchurch mayor Bob Parker said in late February 2011 "the first thing that we will do in this city is put back up on that plinth the man whose vision it was." After a conservation process that included the strengthening of the bronze, the statue was put back on 18 February 2015, "just shy of four years since he tumbled from his plinth."

== Heritage listing ==
On 2 April 1985, the statue was registered by the New Zealand Historic Places Trust as a Category I historic place, with the registration number being 3666. The statue is significant, as it is the only known work of Woolner in New Zealand. It demonstrates the link between the settler community and the Canterbury Association. It was the first portrait statue that was unveiled in New Zealand, and for almost 20 years, it was the only one.

== Gallery ==
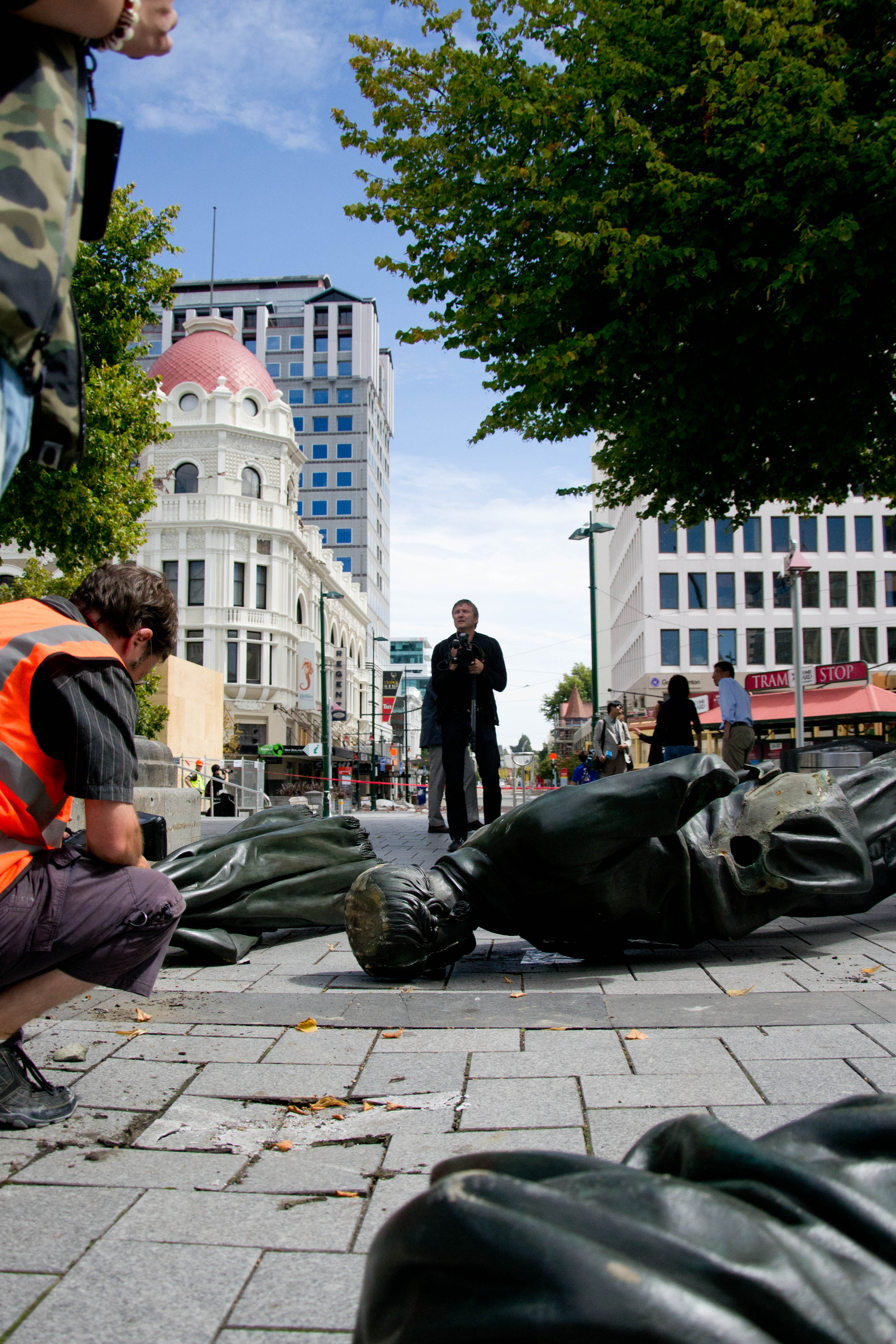
The Godley Statue fell off its plinth in the February 2011 Christchurch earthquake.

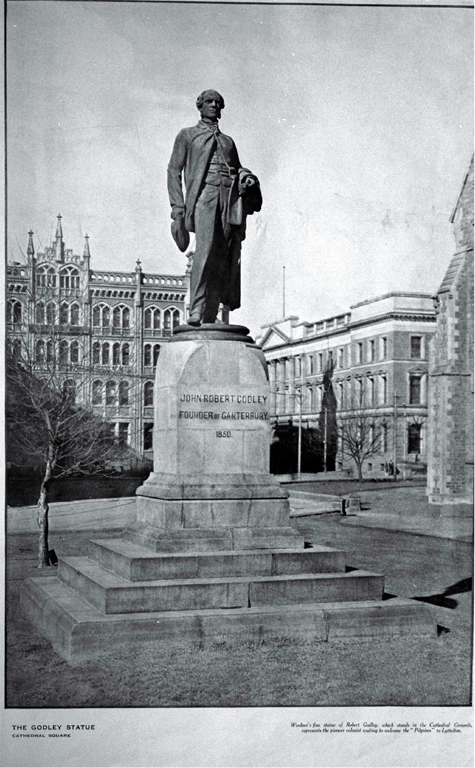
Second position of the statue north of ChristChurch Cathedral, looking east. In the background are The Press (left) and the Government Buildings.

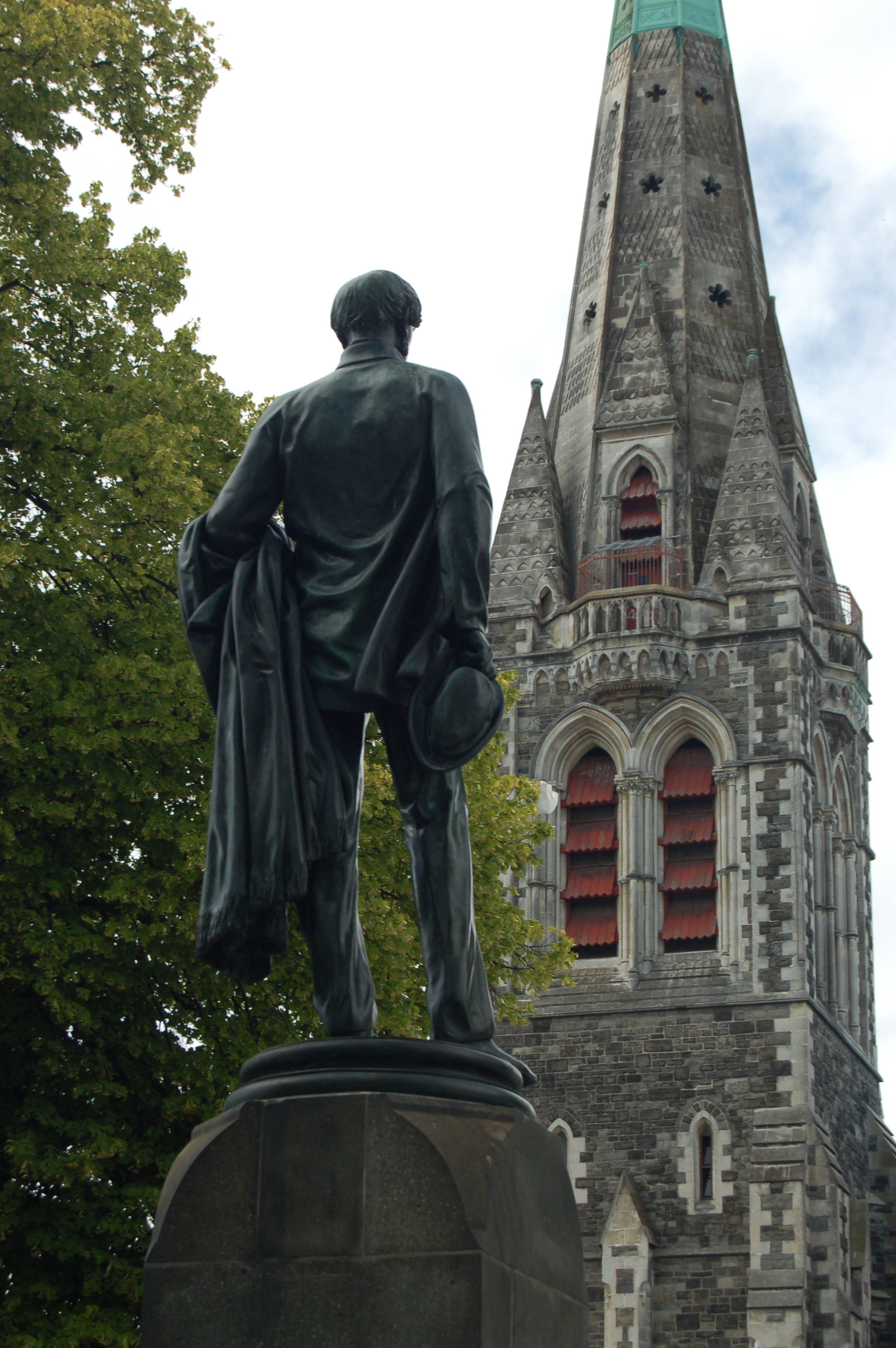
Godley Statue in 2005 in front of the ChristChurch Cathedral. The tower in the background was demolished after the 2011 Christchurch earthquake.
