= John Wynne (cricketer) =

English cricketer and clergyman

Personal information
- Full name: John Henry Griffith Wynne
- Born: 31 March 1819; Coleshill, Warwickshire, England
- Died: 17 October 1893 (aged 74); Windsor, Berkshire, England
- Batting: Unknown
- Bowling: Unknown
- Relatives: Charles Wynne-Finch (brother); Edward Wynne-Finch (nephew)

Domestic team information
- Years: Team
- 1838–1840: Oxford University
- 1850: Marylebone Cricket Club

Career statistics
Competition	First-class
Matches	12
Runs scored	121
Batting average	6.05
100s/50s	–/–
Top score	20
Balls bowled	?
Wickets	7
Bowling average	?
5 wickets in innings	–
10 wickets in match	–
Best bowling	2/?
Catches/stumpings	1/–
- Source: Cricinfo, 17 August 2019

John Henry Griffith Wynne (31 March 1819 – 17 October 1893) was an English first-class cricketer and clergyman.

The son of the politician Charles Griffith-Wynne and his wife, Sarah Hildyard, he was born in March 1819 at Coleshill, Warwickshire. He was educated at Eton College, before going up to Christ Church, Oxford. While studying at Oxford, he made his debut in first-class cricket for Oxford University against the Marylebone Cricket Club (MCC) at Lord's in 1838. He played first-class cricket for Oxford until 1840, making six appearances, in addition to also making one appearance for a combined Oxford and Cambridge Universities cricket team in a tied match against the MCC in 1839.

After graduating from Christ Church, Wynne undertook graduate studies at All Souls College, Oxford, from 1841. Members of All Souls automatically become fellows, however Wynne had his fellowship removed by the college warden in 1851 after perceived misconduct from Wynne after he renounced his communion with the Church of England and denied the Supremacy of the Queen in letters published in October 1850, following his conversion to the Catholic Church. Wynne made further appearances in first-class cricket, playing for the MCC in four matches in 1850, before appearing for the Gentlemen of England against a United England Eleven at Hove in 1853. He became estranged from his father in 1864, and was disinherited from his will. Wynne died at Windsor in October 1893. His brother, Charles, and nephew, Edward Wynne-Finch, both played first-class cricket.
