= Cressy (ship) =

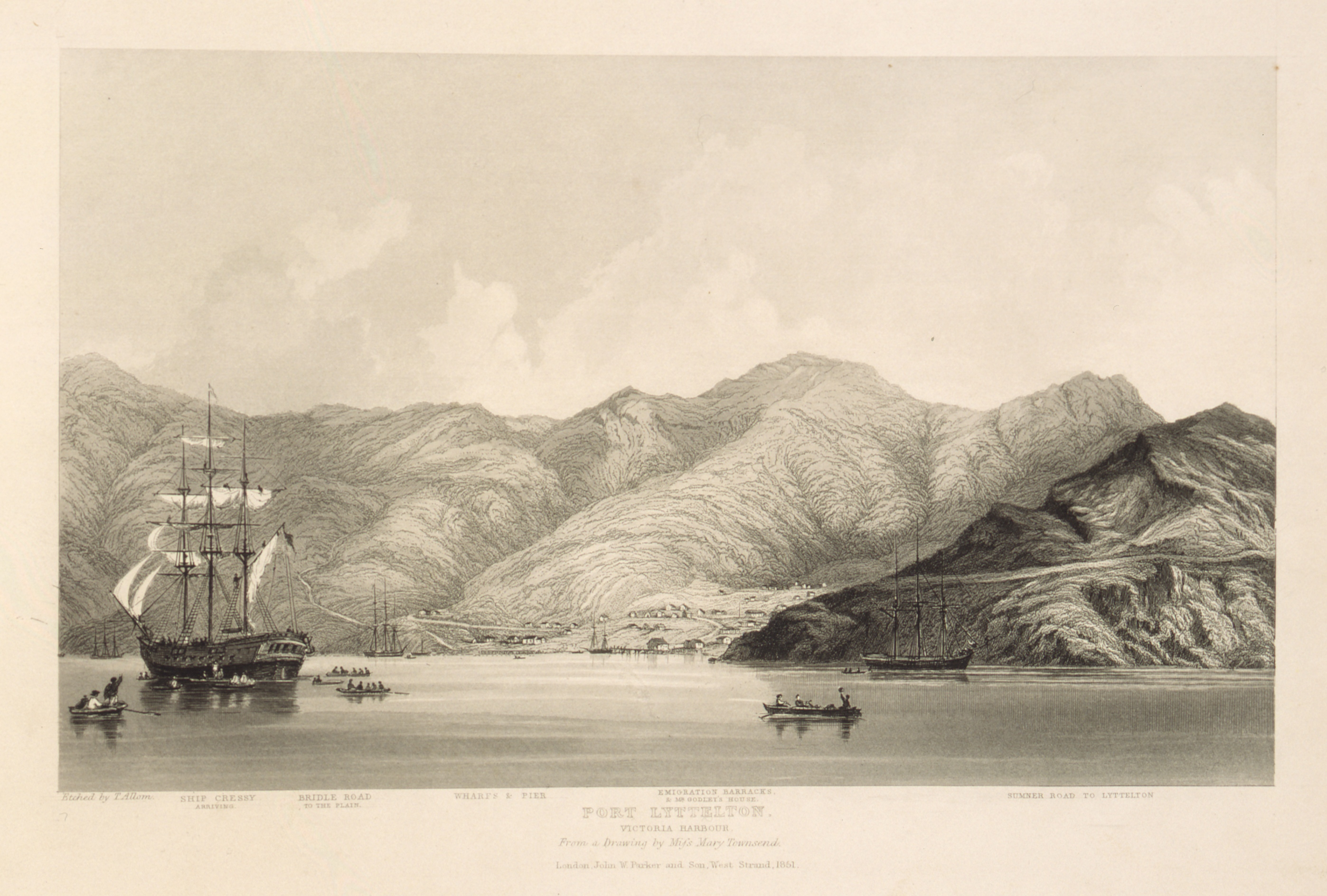
- Cressy anchored at Port Lyttelton; drawing by Mary Townsend

History

United Kingdom
- Name: Cressy
- Builder: Laing shipyard, River Wear, Sunderland
- Launched: 1843

General characteristics
- Class & type: barque
- Tons burthen: 720
- Propulsion: sail

Cressy was one of the First Four Ships in 1850 to carry emigrants from England to the new colony of Canterbury in New Zealand. Cressy was the last to arrive on 27 December.

The passengers aboard these four ships were referred to as the "Canterbury Pilgrims" of Christchurch. Their names are inscribed on a marble plaque in Cathedral Square in the centre of Christchurch.

The ship is remembered in the name of a road, Cressy Terrace, in the port town of Lyttelton.

== Voyage from England to New Zealand ==
On the morning of 4 September 1850. the barque Cressy, J. D. Bell, master, left Gravesend, and was towed down the river. After sailing down the Channel and nearly becalmed off the Isle of Wight, she did not drop anchor in Plymouth Sound until after 3 AM on 7 September. At midnight she left Plymouth, and initially had a run in light air until the end of the month but then encountered breezes from the south and east for almost a month forcing the ship to sail more westward before commenced a good run. From 9 November to 5 December the ship sailed 100 degrees of longitude east between parallels of 37. 30 and 40 S. On 21 December she was in lat. 47. 30 S., 162.48 E. but experienced bad weather. Land was sighted land on the evening of 23 December and the next day she turned to the north for Banks' Peninsula, and at last dropping anchor in Port Victoria before noon on 27 December. Her passage was 110 days from Plymouth Sound. The long passage was put down to fore-topsail being reefed whenever the breeze freshened, as the fore-top-mast had been badly sprung South of the Cape of Good Hope and no confidence could be placed in it taking a heavy load. There was one birth and two deaths, both sickly children. The captain consulted the passengers about their health and comfort and did not run further south, where a shorter passage might have been made, but in colder latitudes.

== Notable passengers ==
- Harry Allwright (1836/1837 – 1892), Member of Parliament for the Lyttelton electorate 1879–1887
- Frances Caverhill (1834–1897), diarist and homemaker
- Arthur Dudley Dobson (1841–1934), pioneer surveyor and engineer, son of Edward Dobson
- Edward Dobson (1816–1908), Provincial Engineer
- George Dobson (1840–1866), surveyor and murder victim (son of Edward Dobson)
- Benjamin Dudley (1805–1892), Anglican priest
- Michael Hart (1814? – 1878), Mayor of Christchurch 1874–1875
- James Townsend (1788–1866), pioneer settler
- Mary Townsend (1822–1869), artist (daughter of James Townsend)
