= Sean Godley =

Irish poet

- Born: 17 November 1981 (age 44); Cavan, County Cavan, Ireland
- Education: University of Gloucestershire; NUI Galway
- Occupation: Writer
- Father: John Godley

The Hon. Sean Godley (born 17 November 1981) is an Irish-Australian writer and poet.

Godley was born in Cavan to The 3rd Baron Kilbracken and his second wife, Susan Heazlewood. He grew up between the family's estate at Killegar, near Carrigallen, County Leitrim, and England.

He was educated at Bradfield College, and gained a BA in Film Studies and Psychology (2004) from The University of Gloucestershire and an MA in Writing (2007) from NUI Galway.

His sonnet "Sitting Still" won the prize for the best short poem at the 2006 Listowel Writer's Week literary festival. He also received the Leitrim Guardian Literary Award for his short story "Flying the Nest".
