= Arthur Godley, 1st Baron Kilbracken =

British aristocrat and civil servant (1847–1932)

The Right Honourable The Lord Kilbracken GCB
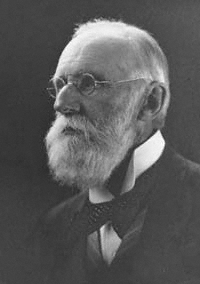
- Lord Kilbracken in later life

Principal Private Secretary to the Prime Minister
- In office 1880–1882
- Prime Minister: William Ewart Gladstone
- Preceded by: Montagu Corry
- Succeeded by: Edward Walter Hamilton

Personal details
- Born: John Arthur Godley; 17 June 1847
- Died: 27 June 1932 (aged 85)
- Spouse: Sarah (Sarina) James (m. 1871)
- Children: 5
- Relatives: Hugh Godley; John Robert Godley; Charlotte Godley; A. D. Godley; Alexander Godley
- Education: Radley College; Rugby School
- Alma mater: Balliol College, Oxford
- Awards: GCB (1908)

John Arthur Godley, 1st Baron Kilbracken, GCB (17 June 1847 – 27 June 1932), was an Anglo-Irish aristocrat and British civil servant and the longest serving, and probably the most influential, Permanent Under-Secretary of State for India.

== Early life ==
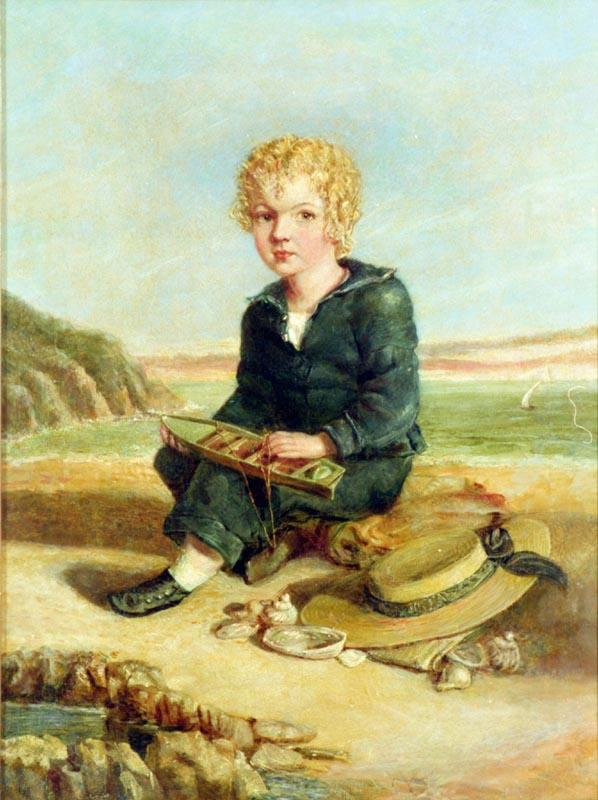
Godley painting by Mary Townsend (July 1851)

Arthur Godley was the only son of John Robert Godley, a colonial reformer, and Charlotte Godley, a letter-writer and community leader. From April 1850 to December 1852, he was with his parents in New Zealand; his father has become to be regarded as the founder of Canterbury. Godley Jr. was painted by Mary Townsend in 1851; the original is held by Canterbury Museum. He studied at Radley, Rugby, and Balliol College, Oxford (where he won the Gaisford Prize for Greek Verse).

== Career ==
His first important role was acting as Assistant Private Secretary to William Ewart Gladstone, then Prime Minister, during the years 1872 to 1874 and called to Lincoln's Inn bar in 1876. He was elected a fellow of Hertford College, Oxford for the period 1874 to 1881. In 1880 Godley was appointed Commissioner for Inland Revenue, a position he held till 1882. Appointed Under-Secretary of State at the India Office in 1883, he remained there for 26 years, retiring in 1909. He was a member of the 'Royal Commission on Indian Finance and Currency' in 1913.

He was bestowed a GCB in the 1908 Birthday honours list, and on 8 December 1909 he was raised to the peerage as The Baron Kilbracken, of Killegar in the County of Leitrim.

His autobiography, Reminiscences of Lord Kilbracken, was published in 1931, the year before he died.

== Personal life ==
Lord Kilbracken was a first cousin of the classical scholar A. D. Godley. He was married to Sarah (Sarina) James daughter of 1st Baron Northbourne on 26 September 1871 until her death on 13 September 1921. The union bore two sons and three daughters. The barony was inherited by his eldest and only surviving son, Hugh.

In 1904, Kilbracken's daughter Katharine Euphemia Godley married the architect J. D. Coleridge, and they had two sons and a daughter.

Government offices
Preceded by Montagu Corry	Principal Private Secretary to the Prime Minister; 1880–1882	Succeeded by Edward Walter Hamilton
Preceded by Louis Mallet	Permanent Under-Secretary of State for India; 1883–1909	Succeeded by Richmond Ritchie
Peerage of the United Kingdom
New creation	Baron Kilbracken; 1909–1932	Succeeded by Hugh John Godley
