= First Four Ships =

1850 settler ships to Canterbury, New Zealand

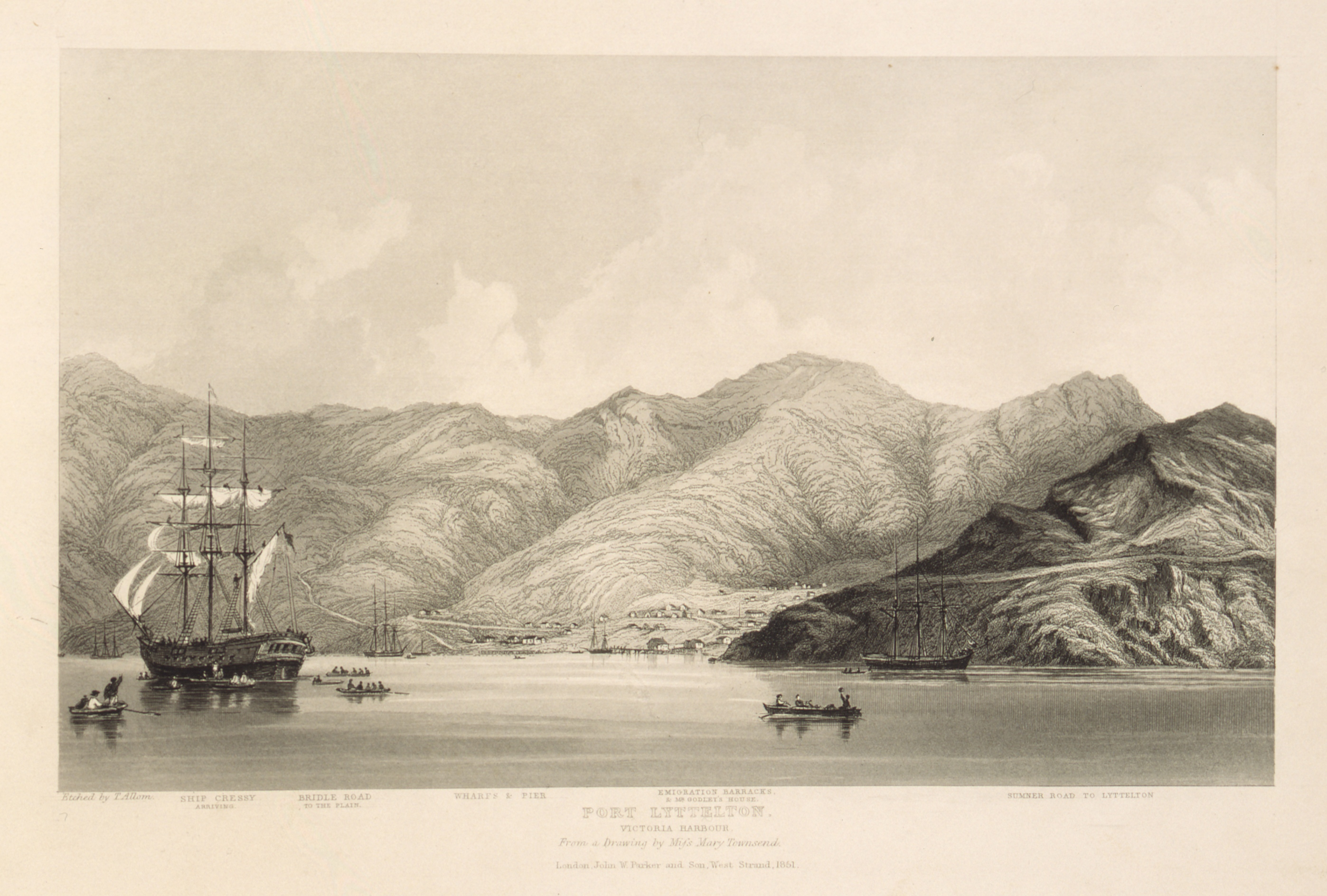
Passengers disembarking from Cressy. In the background are Lyttelton town and other ships riding at anchor in Port Victoria, December 1850

The First Four Ships refers to the four sailing vessels chartered by the Canterbury Association which left Plymouth, England, in September 1850 to transport the first English settlers to new homes in Canterbury, New Zealand. The colonists or settlers who arrived on the first four ships are known as the Canterbury Pilgrims.

== Background ==
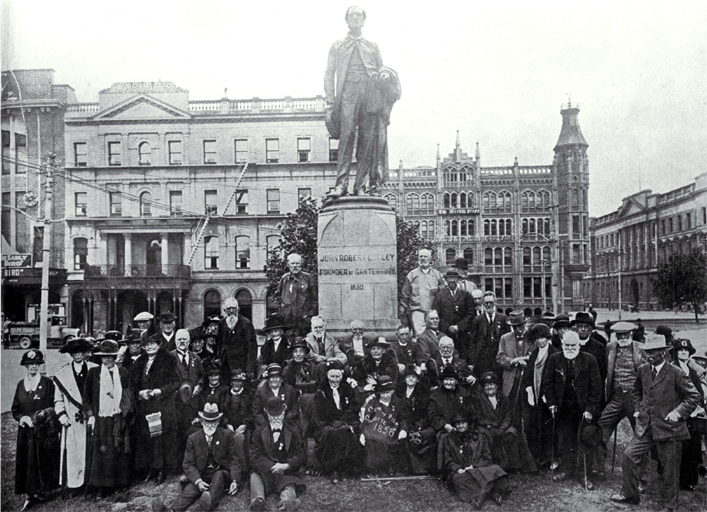
Surviving immigrants from the first six ships celebrate 75 years in Christchurch (Godley Statue, 1925)

Edward Gibbon Wakefield and Irish-born John Robert Godley, the guiding forces within the Canterbury Association, organised an offshoot of the New Zealand Company, a settlement in a planned English enclave in an area now part of the Wairarapa in the North Island of New Zealand. The inaugural meeting of the Canterbury Association took place at 41 Charing Cross, London, on 27 March 1848. The meeting passed a resolution "that the name of the proposed settlement be "Canterbury" and the name of the chief town be "Christchurch"."

== Preparations ==
=== Explorations ===
The Canterbury Association sent Captain Joseph Thomas as chief surveyor and leader of the Association's preliminary expedition. With his two assistants, Thomas Cass and Charles Torlesse (a nephew of Edward Wakefield), Thomas was sent to select, survey and prepare for the proposed settlement. They arrived at New Plymouth aboard Bernicia on 2 November 1848, destined for Wairarapa.

Bernicia called at Nelson where Thomas was told by settlers of unexplored plains stretching north and west of Banks Peninsula. The surveyor's interest was aroused, so they proceeded to Wellington where Thomas wrote to Bishop George Selwyn saying he intended to head to Port Cooper (present-day Lyttelton) to inspect this area. The three, along with Sir William Fox (the newly appointed principal agent to the New Zealand Company) and five survey hands, arrived in Port Cooper aboard the sloop HMS Fly in December 1848. A quick but thorough exploration of the plains left them in no doubt that they had found an ideal site for Canterbury.

=== Preparations in Canterbury ===
With Thomas's suggestion, Governor Grey and Bishop Selwyn decided to site the Canterbury Settlement in this area rather than in the Wairarapa. With Godley, Thomas and his companions set about arranging immigration barracks and the other necessary infrastructure for the settlement at Port Cooper and the new Christchurch. Port Cooper had been named after the proprietors of the Sydney whaling and trading firm of Cooper & Levy.

but he chose the name Lyttelton after Lord Lyttelton of Hagley, a member of the Canterbury Association, and Port Levy's name was never changed.

An initial survey having been completed in early 1849, Thomas went to Wellington and arranged contracts for further surveyors and labourers. Thirty-five arrived on the Fair Tasmanian on 2 July 1849, including architect and civil engineer Henry John Cridland as Superintendent of Works, as well as Donald Gollan as Works Overseer, and assistant surveyor Sydney Scroggs. On 12 August 1849, they were joined by assistant surveyor Edward Jollie and Thomas Brunner as Clerk of Works. During the following six months, Jollie surveyed and drew up town plans for Lyttelton, Sumner and Christchurch as well as laying off the line of road between Lyttelton and Sumner that Cridland had devised. Gollan and the labourers meanwhile constructed a jetty at Lyttelton, formed roads and constructed other engineering works while Scroggs surveyed the road line from Sumner to Christchurch. However, when Godley arrived in April 1850 he stopped all work on account of lack of funds.

In November 1850, Godley was able to secure further funding and Thomas had Jollie survey a Bridle road over a saddle in the Port Hills behind Lyttelton, which was formed by Gollan's road gang. While Thomas and Jollie had named the street of the three towns after the Bishoprics of England, Ireland and the Colonies, the road over the saddle simply became known as the Bridle Path because riders had to dismount and lead their horses by the bridle over the steepest portion of the path near the summit.

== Journey ==
=== The ships ===
Randolph, Cressy, Sir George Seymour, and Charlotte Jane together carried an estimated 790 passengers. In addition, about another 60 worked their passage on the ships or deserted and disembarked. The first of the vessels, Charlotte Jane, landed at Lyttelton Harbour on the morning of 16 December 1850. Randolph followed that afternoon. Sir George Seymour arrived on 17 December, followed ten days later by Cressy on 27 December. Cressy had taken longer because she had sprung her foremast south of the Cape of Good Hope and had to reef those sails.

By the end of summer the colony had been joined by settlers from the Castle Eden, which arrived on 17 February 1851, and then the Isabella Hercus on 1 March. Between March 1851 and early May 1853, a further 22 shiploads of settlers had arrived from England. By then the colony had an estimated population in excess of 3,000. (This figure may be an under-estimate because various lists of passengers didn't always agree, there were also ships arriving from Australia with both passengers and animals, movement within New Zealand was unrestricted, and ships also stopped at other New Zealand settlements before or after visiting Canterbury, but immigrants were registered at their first port of entry.)

=== Social cross section ===
The "colonists", who travelled in the relative luxury of the cabins, included those men and their families who could afford to buy land in the new colony. Some of these settlers' families remain prominent in Christchurch to this day. "Emigrants" included farm workers, labourers and tradesmen, who made the journey in steerage, some having assisted passage. Like their employers, the emigrants included devout Anglicans selected to help build a community founded on religious virtues. Each ship carried a chaplain, a doctor and a schoolmaster, and included in the cargo was a printing press, a library of 2,000 books, a church organ and several pre-fabricated houses in sections. Cabin passengers paid £42 and cheaper berths were £25, whilst steerage passengers paid £15.

=== Greeting the settlers ===
Sir George Grey, the Governor, came down the coast in Her Majesty's sloop of war Fly to welcome their arrival. He and Lady Grey left before the arrival of Cressy. John Robert Godley was also at Lyttelton to meet the settlers.

A marble plaque in Cathedral Square in Christchurch lists the names of the Canterbury Pilgrims, as those who arrived on the first four ships are known.
