= Charles Finch (MP) =

English politician

Member of Parliament for Maidstone
- In office 1777–1780

Member of Parliament for Castle Rising
- In office 1775–1777

Personal details
- Born: 4 June 1752
- Died: 17 December 1819 (aged 67)
- Spouse: Jane Wynne (m. 1778)
- Children: 1, Charles
- Parent: Heneage Finch (father)
- Relatives: Heneage Finch (brother); Edward Finch (brother)
- Education: Christ Church, Oxford

Hon. Charles Finch (4 June 1752 – 17 December 1819) was an English politician who sat in the House of Commons from 1775 to 1780.

== Biography ==
Finch was the son of Heneage Finch, 3rd Earl of Aylesford and his wife Lady Charlotte Seymour, daughter of Charles Seymour, 6th Duke of Somerset. He was educated at Westminster School and matriculated at Christ Church, Oxford on 24 May 1769. On 16 May 1772 he was admitted to Lincoln's Inn.

Finch was returned unopposed as Member of Parliament (MP) for Castle Rising at a by-election on 2 February 1775, on the interest of his cousin, Lord Suffolk. When his brother Lord Guernsey succeeded to the Earldom in 1777 he left his seat at Maidstone vacant. Finch convincingly won a contest at the by-election on 16 May 1777 and was returned as MP for Maidstone. He was defeated at 1780 general election.

Finch married Jane Wynne, the daughter of Watkin Wynne of Pentrefoelas, Denbighshire on 28 December 1778. He died on 17 December 1819. Their only child was their son was Charles Wynn Griffith-Wynne (4 March 1780 – 22 March 1865).

Parliament of Great Britain
Preceded by Alexander Wedderburn; Robert Mackreth	Member of Parliament for Castle Rising; 1775–1777; With: Robert Mackreth	Succeeded by John Chetwynd-Talbot; Robert Mackreth
Preceded by Lord Guernsey; Horatio Mann	Member of Parliament for Maidstone; 1777–1780; With: Horatio Mann	Succeeded by Clement Taylor; Horatio Mann
