= A. D. Godley =

British classical scholar and poet (1856–1925)

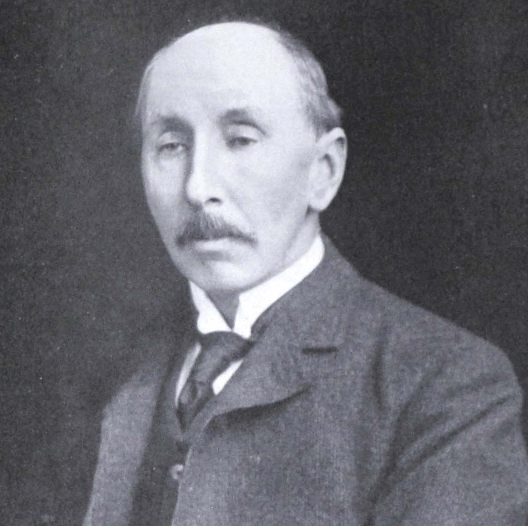
- Born: Alfred Denis Godley; 22 January 1856; Ashfield, County Cavan, Ireland
- Died: 27 June 1925 (aged 69)
- Education: Balliol College, Oxford
- Occupation: Classicist

Alfred Denis Godley (22 January 1856 – 27 June 1925) was an Anglo-Irish classical scholar and author of humorous poems.

Godley was born in Ashfield, County Cavan, to Rev James Godley and his wife Eliza La Touche. James was the Church of Ireland Rector of Ashfield from 1849 to 1861, then Rector of Lavey. From 1866 to 1904 he served as Rector of Carrigallen, County Leitrim.

He was educated at Harrow and Balliol College, Oxford and was elected to a Fellowship at Magdalen College, Oxford in 1883. From 1910 to 1920, A. D. Godley was Public Orator at the University of Oxford, a post that involved composing citations in Latin for the recipients of honorary degrees. One of these was for Thomas Hardy who received an Honorary D. Litt. in 1920, and whose treatment of rural themes Godley compared to Virgil.

He is known for his humorous verse, including macaronic pieces such as The Motor Bus, in which the English phrase "motor bus" is declined as though it were Latin. He was a contributor to several periodicals, especially The Oxford Magazine, which he edited from 1890, and published several collections of his poems.

Godley's published works include:

- Verses to Order (1892)
- Aspects of Modern Oxford (1894)
- Socrates and Athenian Society in His Day (1896)
- Lyra Frivola (1899)
- Second Strings (1902)
- Oxford in the Eighteenth Century (1908)
- The Casual Ward (1912)
- Reliquiae A. D. Godley (1926)

He also published translations of Herodotus (1921) and Horace's Odes (1898).

Godley was a first-cousin of The 1st Baron Kilbracken, who, as Sir Arthur Godley, was the long-serving Permanent Under-Secretary of State for India.

He was also an active mountaineer and the vice-president of the Alpine Club in 1924.
