= John Robert Godley =

Irish administrator, influential in foundation of Canterbury, New Zealand

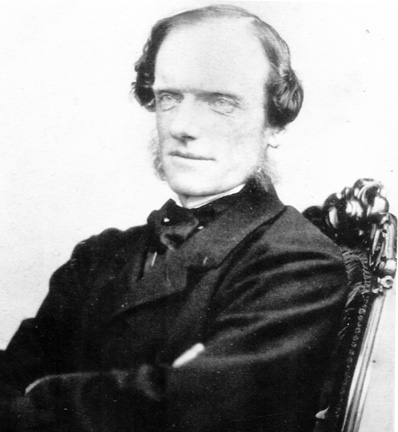
- Portrait of John Robert Godley
- Born: 29 May 1814; Dublin, Ireland
- Died: 29 November 1861 (aged 47); London, England
- Monuments: Godley Statue in Christchurch
- Education: Christ Church, Oxford
- Occupation: Colonial reformer
- Employer: Canterbury Association
- Known for: Founder of Canterbury
- Spouse: Charlotte Godley
- Children: Arthur Godley, 1st Baron Kilbracken
- Relatives: Denis Daly (grandfather); James Daly, 1st Baron Dunsandle and Clanconal (uncle); Robert Daly (uncle); Sir Morgan George Crofton, 3rd Baronet (uncle by marriage); A. D. Godley (nephew); Alexander Godley (nephew); Charles Griffith-Wynne (father-in-law); Charles Wynne (brother-in-law); Hugh Godley, 2nd Baron Kilbracken (grandson)

John Robert Godley (29 May 1814 – 17 November 1861) was an Anglo-Irish statesman and bureaucrat. Godley is considered to be the founder of Canterbury, New Zealand, although he lived there for only two years.

== Early life ==
Godley was born in Dublin, the eldest son of John Godley and Katherine Daly. His father was an Anglo-Irish landlord with country estates in County Leitrim and County Meath in Ireland. He was educated at Harrow School and Christ Church, Oxford, graduating in classics in 1836. He was always very sickly, which prevented him from pursuing a chosen career in law.

== Adult life ==
After graduating from university, Godley travelled over much of Ireland and North America. His travelling influenced and helped to form his ideas about the establishment and governing of colonies. In 1843 he was appointed High Sheriff of Leitrim and, in the following year, Deputy Lieutenant and a Justice of the Peace. He married Charlotte Griffith Wynne, daughter of Charles Griffith-Wynne of Denbighshire, in September 1846. In 1847, he failed in a bid to represent County Leitrim in the UK parliament. He was one of three candidates in the two-member electorate, and he faced strong opposition by the Roman Catholic priests, who opposed his emigration scheme to Canada as a measure to address the Irish famine. Edward King Tenison and Charles Skeffington Clements beat Godley with 385 and 354 votes to 319.

At this time, because of his extensive travel and ideas on the subject of colonisation Godley was asked by Edward Gibbon Wakefield, the owner of the New Zealand Company, to found a colony in New Zealand that would follow the beliefs of the Church of England. Godley was persuaded to lead this new colony because of his political connections, which helped to secure funds for the colony.

Four years later he and his family arrived in Port Cooper (Lyttelton) in April 1850. Upon arrival he was met by Captain Joseph Thomas and shown the construction plans for three separate towns and housing plans for the current settlement at Lyttelton. A fleet of four ships reached Lyttelton in December 1850. Randolph, Cressy, Sir George Seymour, and Charlotte Jane all carried pilgrims and supplies for the planned colony. For the next two years he served as leader of the settlement, which was called Christchurch. He negotiated with the Canterbury Association in order to get them to change their conditions for pastoral leases to ensure that the colony was able to make a good start with a strong farming base. Godley believed that the Canterbury Association's purpose was to found Canterbury, not to rule it. He thought that the colony should be self-governing. In November 1852, a deputation put a requisition to John Robert Godley, asking him to allow himself to be nominated for the first election for Superintendent of the Canterbury Province; James FitzGerald was part of that deputation, which he declined.

He left Canterbury for England in December 1852. At a banquet held in his honour at Greenwich's Trafalgar Hotel, Godley gave an insightful overview of the progress made in Canterbury during the short time since its founding. In England, Godley worked as a columnist and essayist for several newspapers. He mainly wrote about colonial reform, a subject clearly dear to his heart. He also was employed at the War Office. There he continued his argument for the self-governing of the British colonies.

Godley died on 17 November 1861 in London. A bronze statue bearing his likeness was erected in Cathedral Square by the people of Christchurch in 1867. It was designed by artist Thomas Woolner. The statue fell off its pedestal during the February 2011 Christchurch earthquake, but has been re-erected.

Godley's only son was Sir Arthur Godley, later created Baron Kilbracken. His nephew was General Sir Alexander Godley, the controversial commander of the New Zealand Expeditionary Force (NZEF) in WWI.

The house that had been built for Godley in Lyttelton was later demolished to make way for a building of the Plunket Society. The Plunket building was from 1943 and was damaged in the February 2011 earthquake. Upon its eventual demolition in June 2012, the post holes of Godley's house were discovered. Archaeologists believe that Godley's two-storey house had at least six rooms, which is substantial for a very early colonial building.
