= Cotons' Cottage =

Historic cob house museum in Hororata, New Zealand

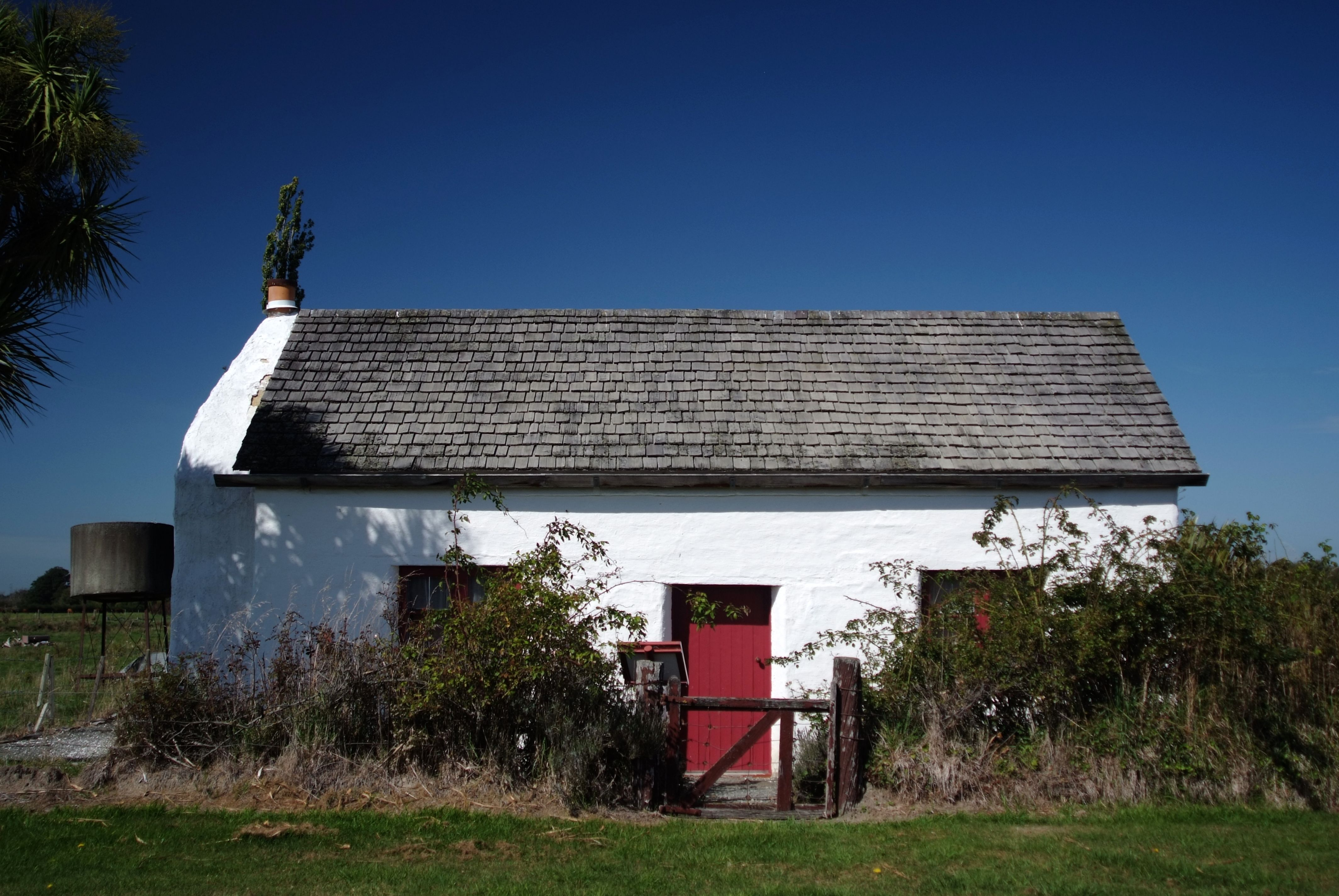
- Cotons' Cottage in 2008

General information
- Type: Homestead
- Location: 50 Cotons Road, Hororata, New Zealand
- Coordinates: 43°32′34″S 171°57′37″E.
- Completed: c. 1864
- Renovated: 1977–1978; 2013–2014
- Closed: 2010–2014

Technical details
- Material: Cob

Website
- Official

Heritage New Zealand – Category 2
- Designated: 23 June 1983
- Reference no.: 3071

References
- "Cotons' Cottage". New Zealand Heritage List/Rārangi Kōrero. Heritage New Zealand.

Cotons' Cottage is an historic cob house museum in Hororata, New Zealand. It was built sometime after 1864 by Bentley and Sarah Coton. It is Category II-listed by Heritage New Zealand.

== History ==
Bentley and Sarah Coton arrived from Yorkshire, England to Lyttelton in 1859 onboard the ship Mystery. Upon their arrival, they purchased 50 acres of land, where it is thought this made them the first smallholder farmers in the Hororata area. Bentley used clay from this farm to build the cottage, which consisted of five rooms: an attic, two bedrooms, a living room, and a general store room and dairy at the back of the building. The roof consisted of thatch, sourced from tussock grasses growing around the farm. This was replaced by wooden shingles later on.

The cottage was used for Anglican services until 1875, when St John's Church (the wooden church) was built.

In 1913, Bentley died, and Sarah Coton moved to Christchurch and remained there until her death in 1919. The cottage passed ownership twice; first by Jonathan Rudd in 1913, and then David Bruce (1913–1927). After Herbert Oliver purchased the cottage, it became uninhabited and its condition started to deteriorate. It was reportedly used as a barn in a report dated 1939. Already here, the chimney and chimney breast were in a poor condition. By the time of this report, the roof was made of corrugated iron.

=== Donation ===
In 1974, the cottage and a quarter of an acre of land was donated by Raymond Oliver (descendant of Herbert Oliver) to the Department of Lands and Survey in order to establish a museum and reserve, as well as to address the issue of the deteriorating nature of the building. In 1977, the cottage and land were gazetted as an historic reserve and passed into the control of the New Zealand Historic Places Trust (now Heritage New Zealand).

Volunteers from the Hororata Historic Society Inc. began the renovation of the cottage the same year, using the original clay from the building and reusing approximately a third of the original timber A-frame for the roof.

=== 2010 Canterbury earthquake ===
The cottage was damaged in the 2010 Canterbury earthquake and closed to the public. It was repaired from 2013–2014 using clay sourced from the same area as the original building materials were from.
