= Hororata Highland Games =

Scottish game event festival hosted in New Zealand

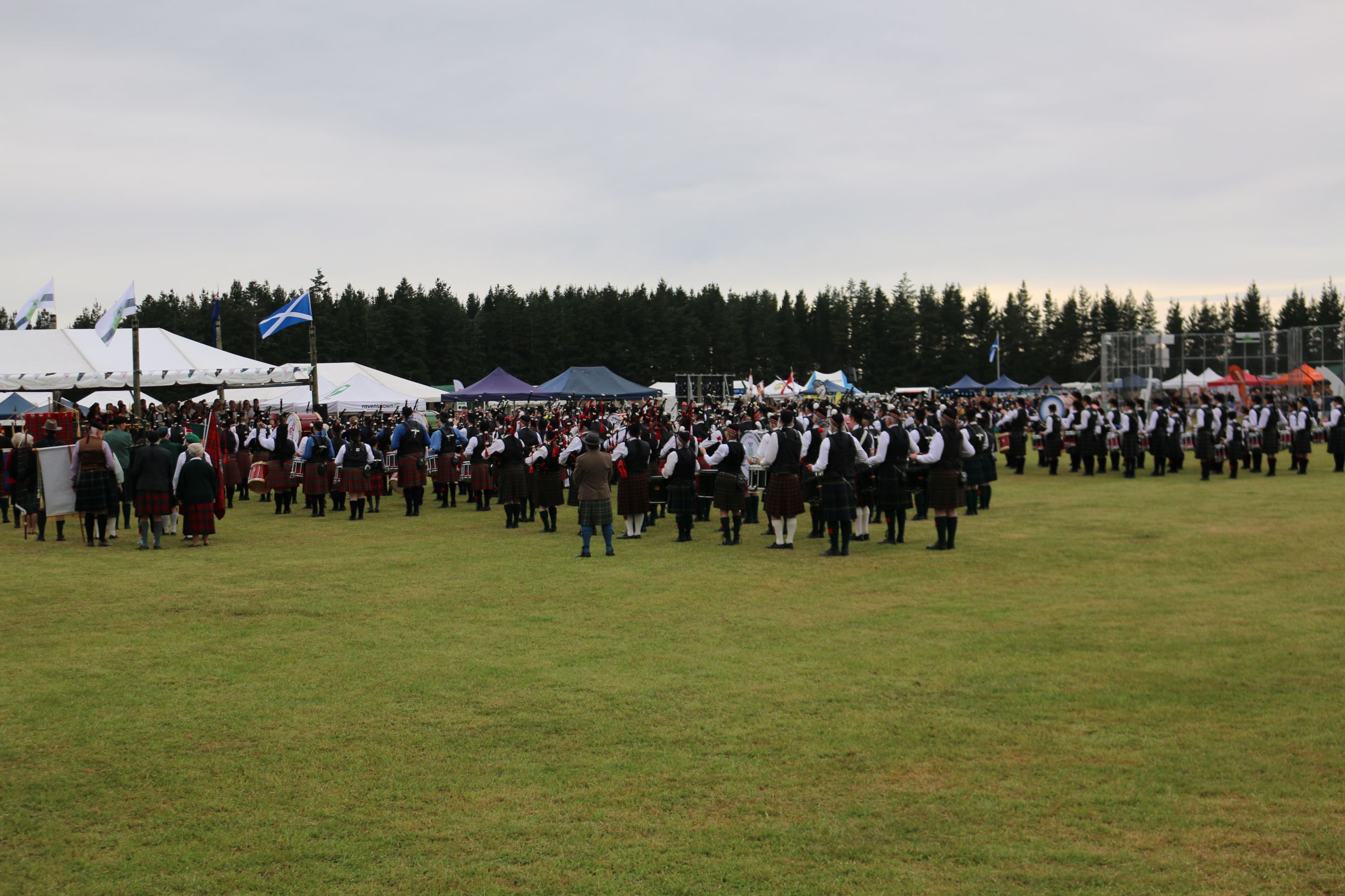
- Pipe Bands at the opening of the 2020 Hororata Highland Games
- Status: Active
- Locations: Hororata, Canterbury
- Coordinates: 43°32′1.88″S 171°57′14.92″E
- Country: New Zealand
- Inaugurated: 5 November 2011
- Most recent: 11 November 2023
- Attendance: 10,000 (2022)
- Website: hororatahighlandgames.org.nz

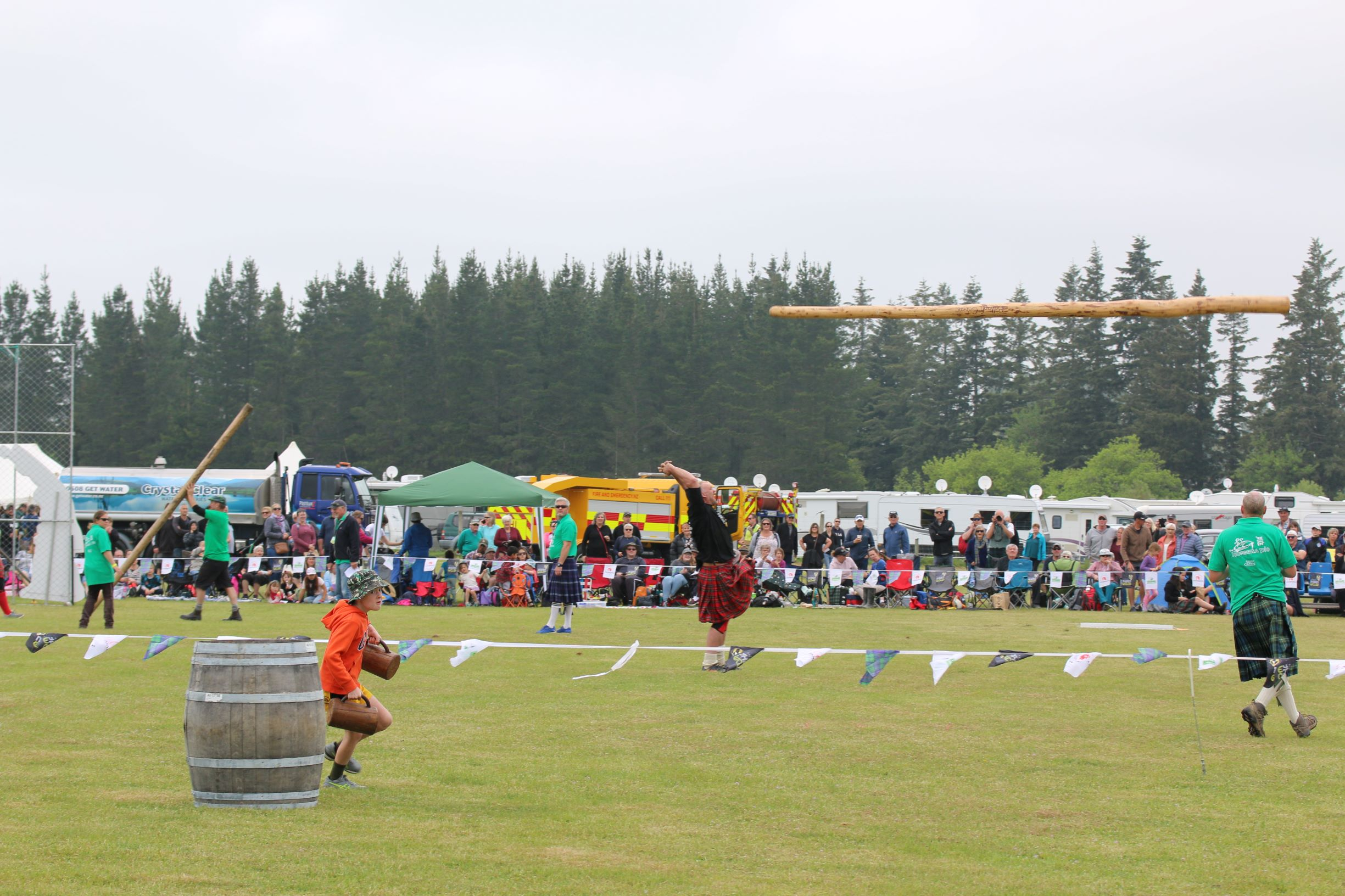
Competitors in the senior and junior competitions strive to win.

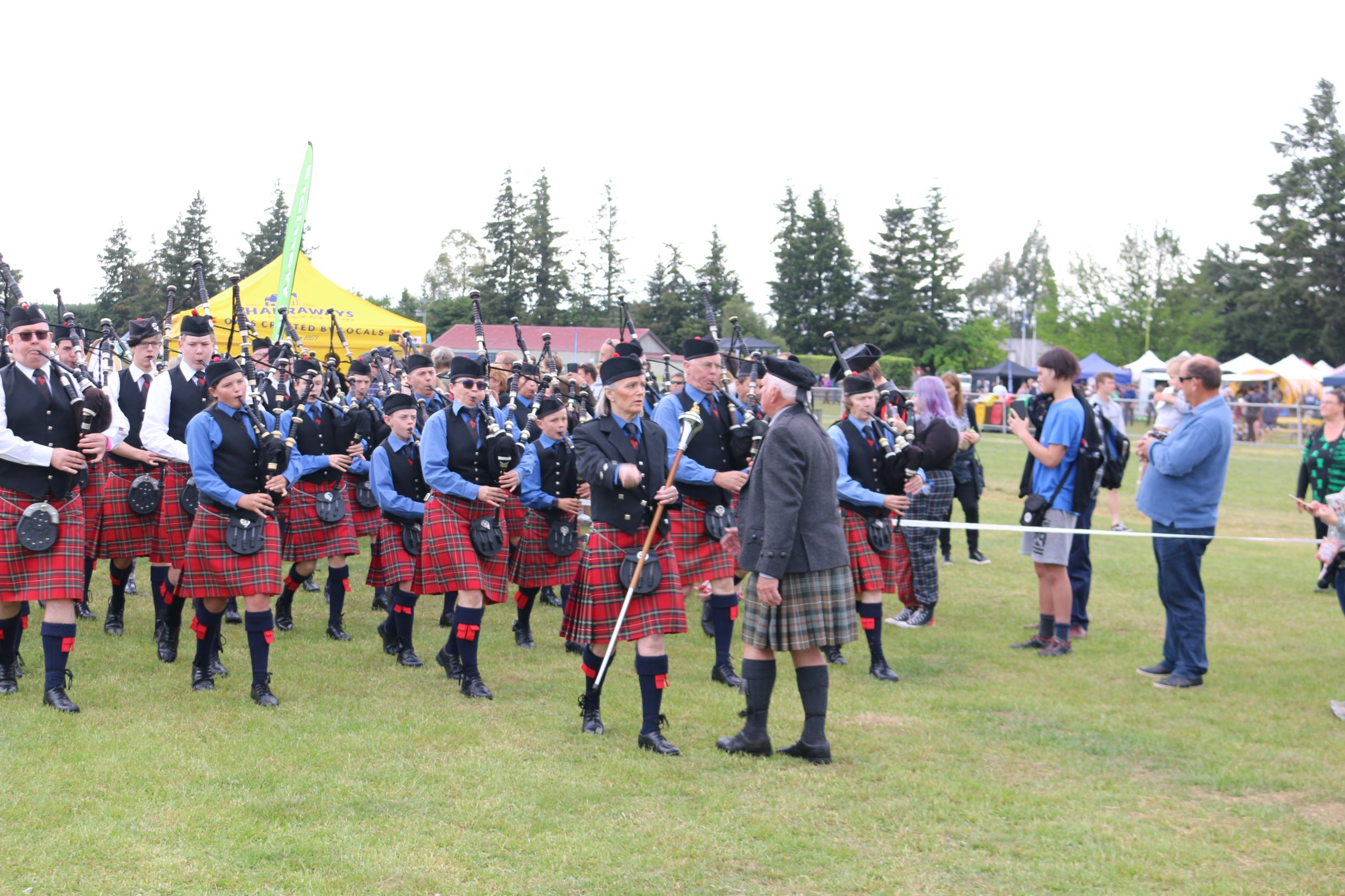
Pipe bands performing on the Hororata Domain during the Hororata Highland Games, (November 2020)

The Hororata Highland Games is an annual event held in Hororata, New Zealand. The Games began in 2011, following the 2010 Canterbury earthquake. The Hororata community had a desire to make a positive change following the damage of the Canterbury earthquakes. The annual event has increased in popularity with 10,000 people coming to the 2016 edition. It has since become New Zealand's biggest Scottish festival.

In 2020, the coronavirus pandemic closed New Zealand's borders. This left overseas tourists unable to attend the Games. Despite this, 8,500 people showed up to its tenth event. However, the 2021 event was cancelled. In 2022, the event was held again, with 10,000 people attending the eleventh games and six hundred competitors taking part in traditional Scottish Sports.

== Chieftain ==
There is a Chieftain for each games who presides over the opening ceremony. These have included:

- 2011: Simon Dallow
- 2012: Gerry Brownlee (MP for Ilam, Minister for Christchurch)
- 2013: Sir Jerry Mateparae (20th Governor-General of New Zealand)
- 2014: Sir Bob Parker (Mayor of Christchurch)
- 2015: Alex Bruce (Director of Adelphi Distillery, Scotland)
- 2016: Kyle Warren (Bagpipe musician)
- 2017: Amy Adams (MP for Selwyn)
- 2018: Patrick Hellier (Highland Games Heavy athlete)
- 2019: Peri Drysdale
- 2020: John de Vries
- 2022: Kate Foster (local historian)
- 2023: Colin Forsyth (founding committee member)

== Economy ==
A study conducted by the University of Canterbury looked at the economic benefits of the Hororata Highland Games. This found that they provided $370,000 to the Selwyn District economy in 2019.

== Events ==
The Games have over 300 competitors turn up each year, with about 570 competitors competing in 2020. Competitions include Highland Dancing, Piping and Drumming, Tug O’ War and Scottish heavy athletics (men's and women's). The heavy athletics include the hammer throw, the sheaf toss, the Hororata stones and tossing the caber. The Kilted mile is a race over a mile which includes eating a Hororata Pie, Drinking a traditional Scottish drink and negotiating a series of obstacles. There are also stalls, food vendors and a fairground each year.

== Statistics ==
No.	Year	Attendees	Competitors	Ref
1	2011			
2	2012			
3	2013			
4	2014	8,000	350	
5	2015	9,000+	300+	
6	2016	10,000		
7	2017	10,000+		
8	2018	~ 9,000	500+	
9	2019			
10	2020	8,500	~570	
11	2022	10,000	600	
12	2023		~1000	
