= 1862 Heathcote by-election =

New Zealand by-election

The 1862 Heathcote by-election was a by-election held on 12 June 1862 during the 3rd New Zealand Parliament in the Christchurch electorate of Heathcote.

The by-election was caused by the resignation of the incumbent MP George Williamson Hall.

The by-election was won by William Sefton Moorhouse. He was unopposed.

At two other by-elections held in June 1862 for Avon and Ellesmere the candidates were also returned unopposed; see 1862 by-election and 1862 by-election.
