= George Williamson Hall =

New Zealand politician (1818–1896)

George Hall

Member of the New Zealand Parliament for Heathcote
- In office 12 February 1861 – 1862
- Preceded by: Office established
- Succeeded by: William Moorhouse

Personal details
- Born: 7 September 1818 Sculcoates, England
- Died: 27 February 1896 (aged 77) Christchurch, New Zealand
- Resting place: St John Cemetery, Hororata
- Party: Independent
- Spouse: Agnes Dryden
- Relatives: Sir John Hall (brother)

George Williamson Hall (7 September 1818 – 27 February 1896) was a 19th-century Member of Parliament in Christchurch, New Zealand.

== Biography ==
New Zealand Parliament
| Years | Term | Electorate | Party |
|---|---|---|---|
| 1861–1862 | 3rd | Heathcote | Independent |

George Hall was born in Sculcoates, Yorkshire, in 1818. He married Agnes Emma Dryden in 1850 at Kingston upon Hull. She died aged 91 at Christchurch, Canterbury, New Zealand.

George was the eldest brother of Sir John Hall, 12th Premier of New Zealand. George and Agnes Hall emigrated to Canterbury in 1853, arriving on the Royal Albert; John Hall had emigrated a year before them.

Agnes's sister, Rose Anne Dryden married John Hall in 1861 at Kingston upon Hull.

Hall began his early life at sea, as a merchant seaman and after arriving in New Zealand, became a pastoralist. Hall stood for the Heathcote seat in the General Assembly in 1861 and defeated Feliz Wakefield comfortably.

== Political career ==
The polling for the 1861 election in the Heathcote electorate took place on 12 February 1861. Hall and Edward Wakefield contested the election. Hall was a local resident with no prior political experience. Wakefield, on the other hand, came from a family of politicians. He had just been beaten in the Wellington electorate and then came to Heathcote, as the election was held later than in Wellington. Hall and Wakefield received 94 and 35 votes, respectively. Thus, Hall was elected to represent Heathcote in the 3rd New Zealand Parliament.

He represented the Heathcote electorate to 1862, when he resigned. The resulting by-election was won by William Sefton Moorhouse.

Hall died at his residence in Christchurch's Park Terrace on 27 February 1896 and was buried in the cemetery at St John's Church in Hororata.

New Zealand Parliament
| New constituency | Member of Parliament for Heathcote; 1861–1862 | Succeeded by William Sefton Moorhouse |
