= St John's Church, Hororata =

St John's Church
- St John's Memorial Church
- Hororata Memorial Church
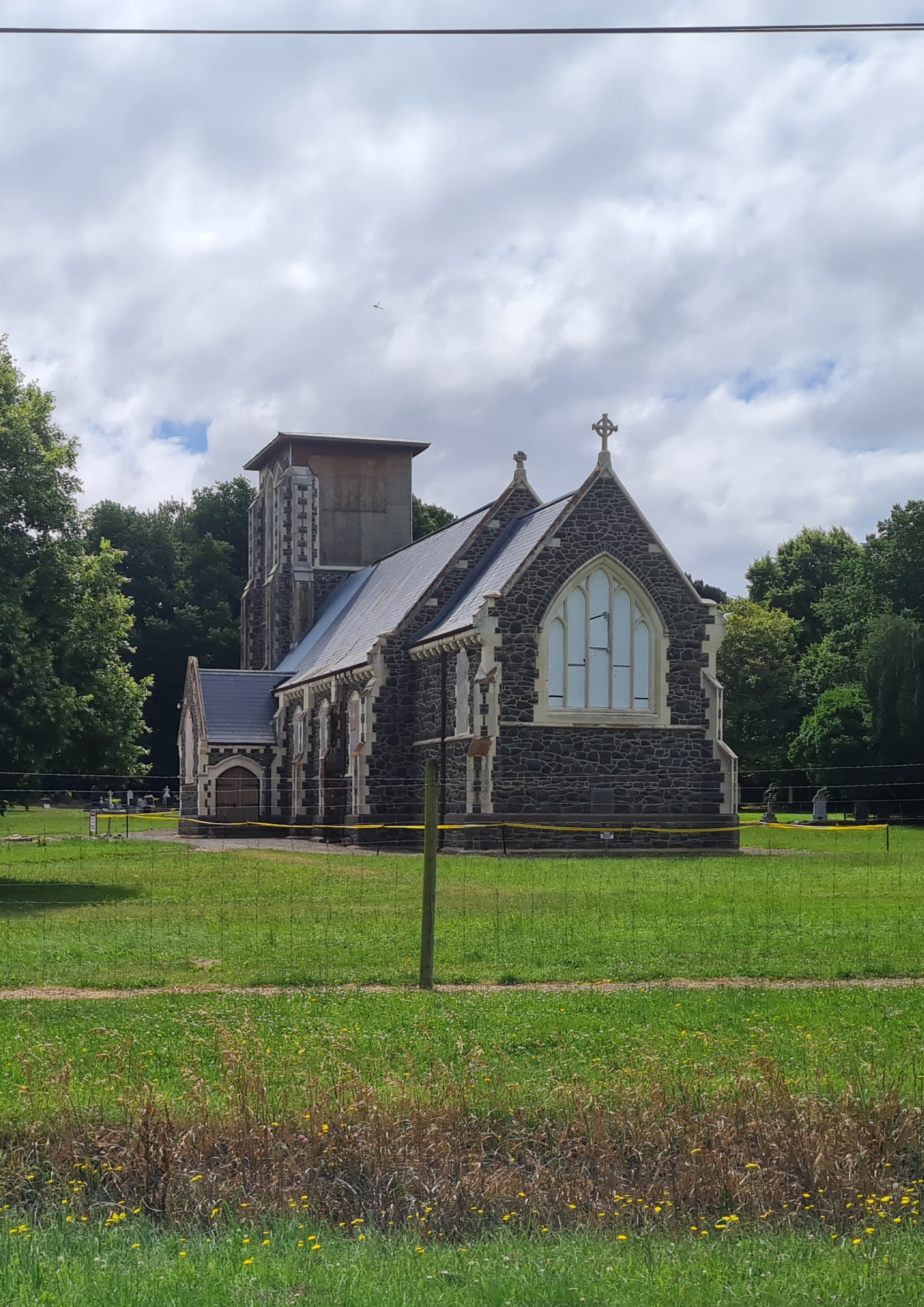
- St John's Church in 2024
- St John's Church
- 43°31′09″S 171°56′47″E
- Location: Scotts Road, Hororata
- Country: New Zealand
- Previous denomination: Anglican
- Website: www.hororataparish.co.nz

History
- Status: Church
- Founded: 1875
- Dedication: John the Apostle; Lady Rose Hall, wife of Sir John Hall
- Consecrated: 27 February 1911
- Events: 2010 Canterbury earthquake

Architecture
- Functional status: Closed
- Architectural type: Church
- Style: Gothic Revival
- Completed: 1911
- Closed: 4 September 2010

Specifications
- Materials: Stone

St John's Church, Hororata also known as St John's Memorial Church and the Hororata Memorial Church is a former Anglican church located on Scotts Road, Hororata, New Zealand.

The church was closed in September 2010 and the Hororata congregation use the heritage-listed St John's Hall for services.

== History ==
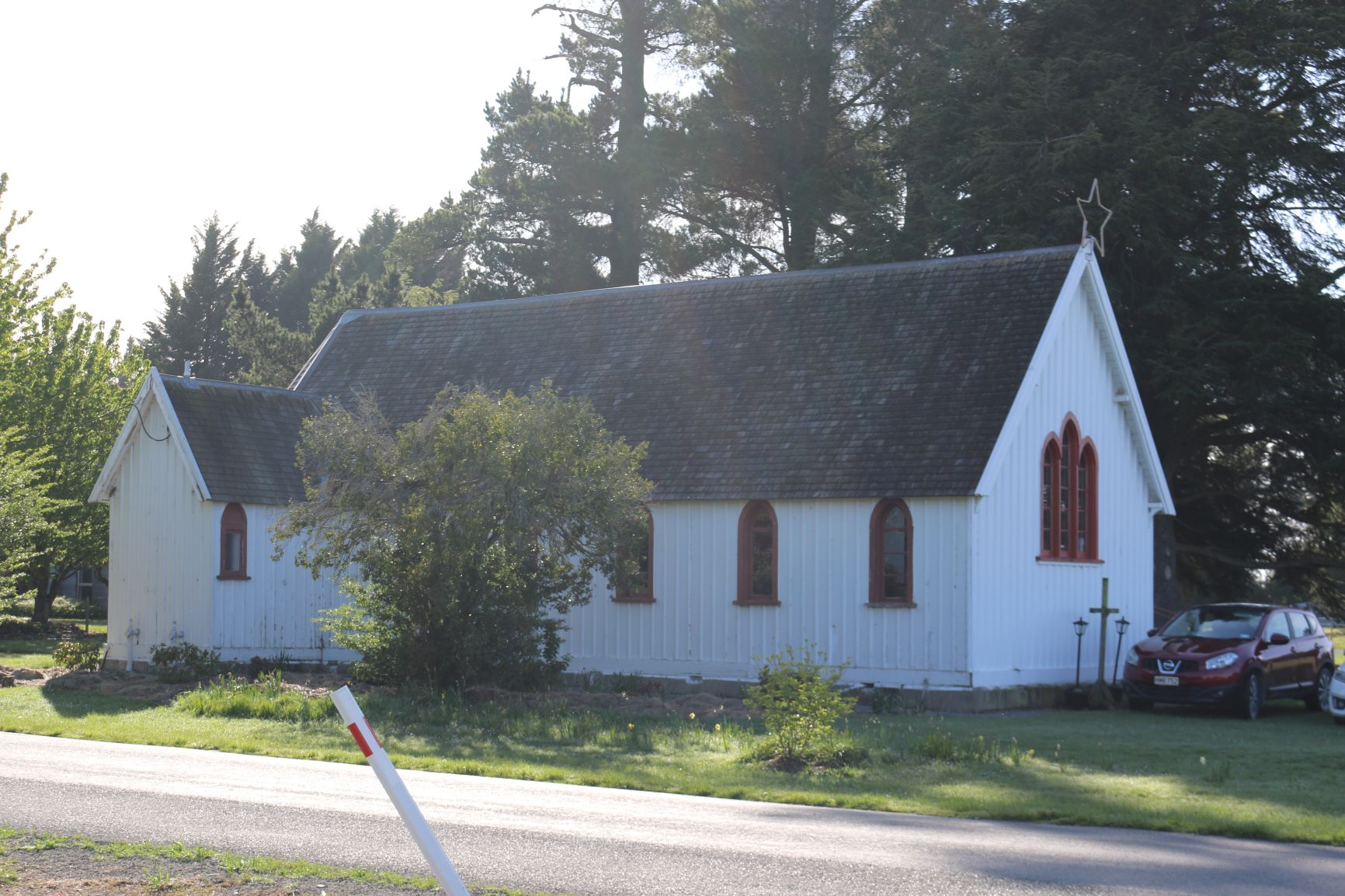
St John's Hall, now used as the church

=== St John's Hall ===
The first building to be built on the site was a small wooden church, which was built in 1875. On 23 June 1983, the wooden church was registered by the New Zealand Historic Places Trust as a Category 2 historic place, with the registration number being 1785. The building was later moved across the road to its present day location for the construction of the current stone church. Meanwhile, the 1881 wooden church had become the parish hall, but since the 2010 Canterbury earthquake it has been used for services.

=== St John's Church ===
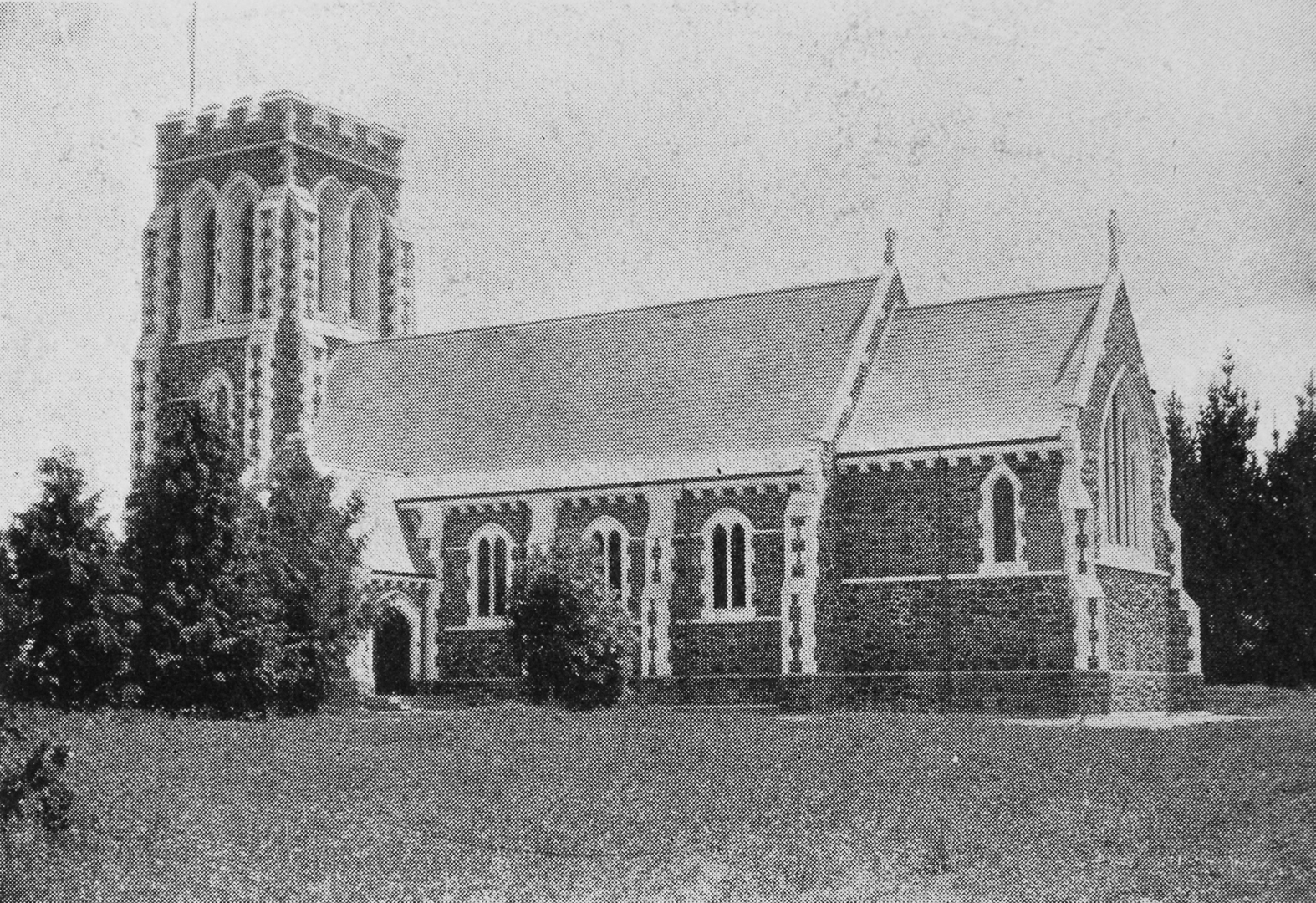
The church, shortly after it was completed

On 6 February 1910, the stone church had its foundation stone laid and the building consecrated on 27 February 1911. The funds were bequeathed by former New Zealand Premier, Sir John Hall as a memorial for his late wife, Rose, Lady Hall.

The new church was built of local stone from the Malvern Hills – volcanic rock from the Wairiri Valley, Glentunnel and the interior of Oamaru stone. Before construction was started, samples of the stone were sent to England for testing and were pronounced to be of excellent quality. However, as far as is known, no other building has been made of it.

In June 1914, the stained glass window was made in England, and installed. The pulpit was added in 1961 for the church's 50th Jubilee.

The organ was built from ranks of pipes from the organ of St Augustine's in Cashmere, and also Christchurch Cathedral's first organ. It was completed in 1970.

=== 2010 Canterbury earthquake ===
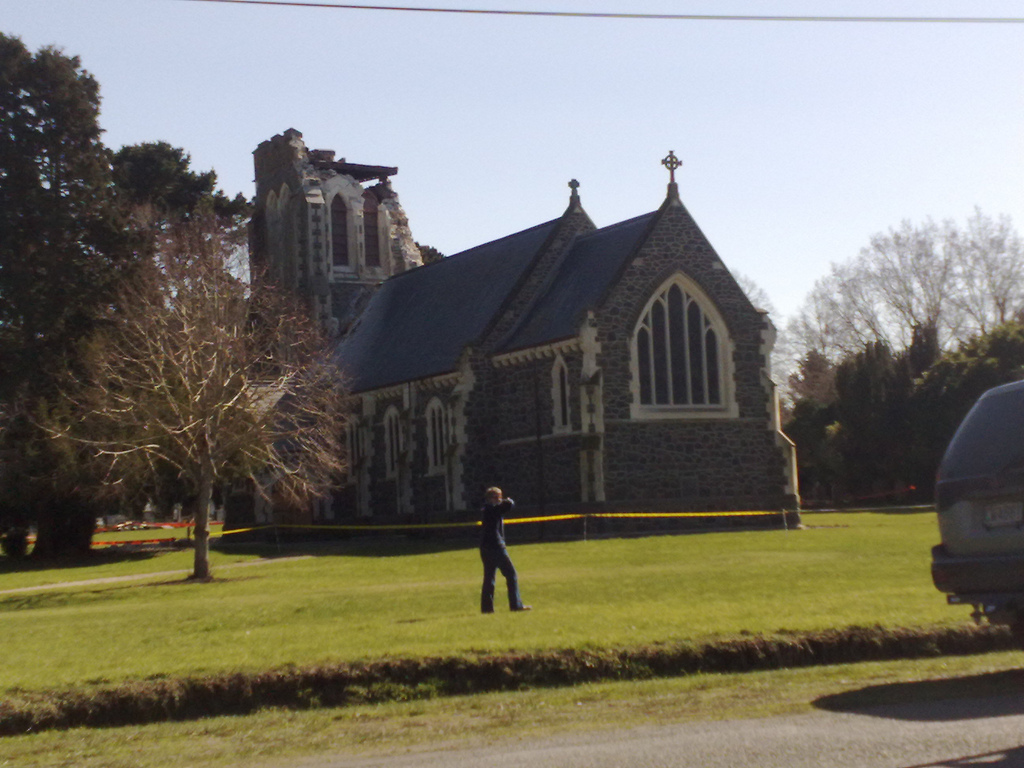
St John's Church on the morning of 4 September 2010

The church suffered major damage during the 2010 Canterbury earthquake, causing the bell tower to partially collapse into the nave and surrounding gravestones. The church's organ, which was originally installed at ChristChurch Cathedral had been totally destroyed. The church will be repaired at a cost of NZ$3 million. Local initiatives were set up in the years following the earthquake to help raise the restoration costs, notably the Hororata Highland Games (first held in 2011) and the Hororata Night Glow.

== Notable burials ==
- Sir John Hall (1824–1907), New Zealand politician.
- George Williamson Hall (1818–1896), New Zealand politician
