= Hororata =

Settlement in Canterbury, New Zealand

- Village
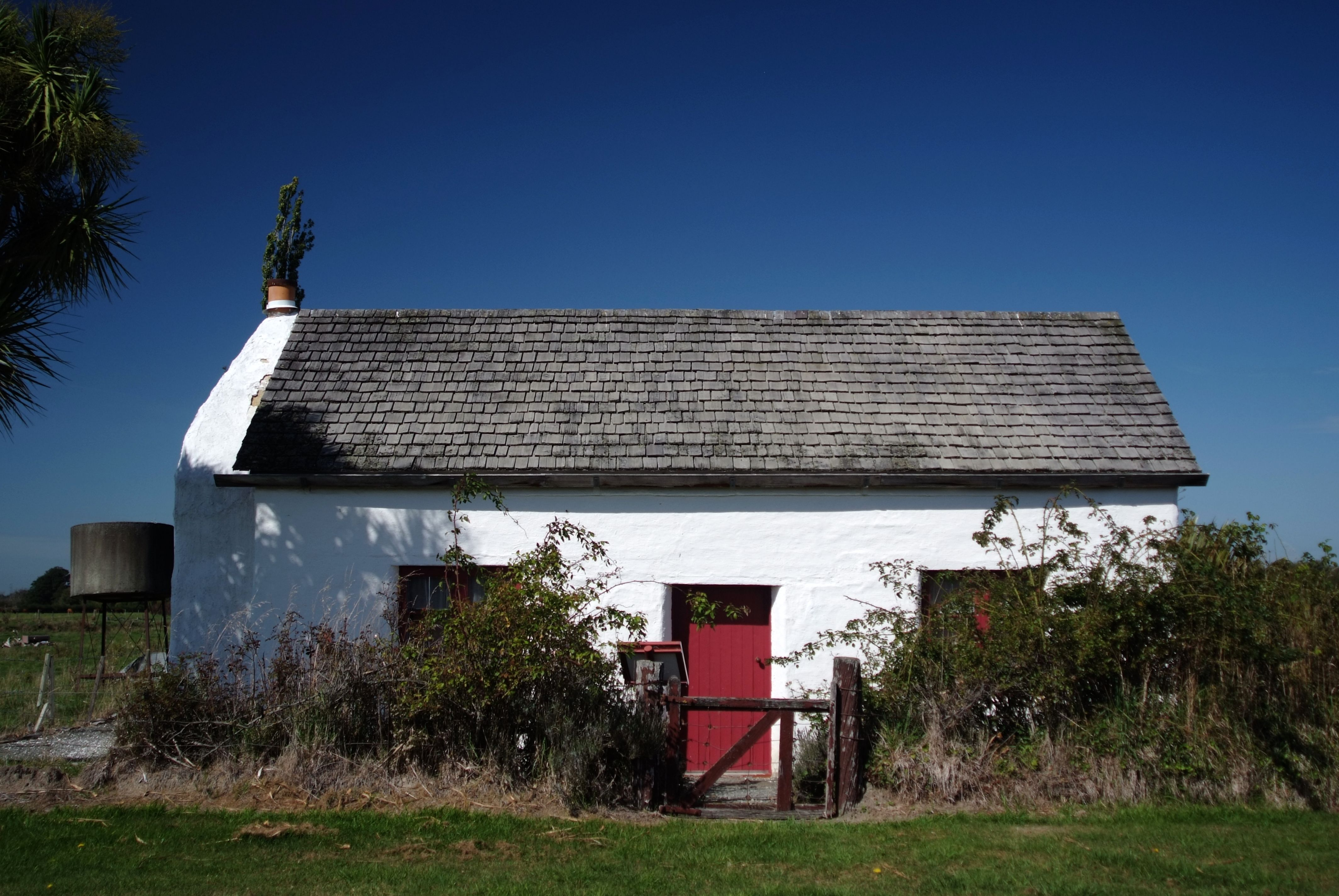
- Cotons' Cottage, March 2008
- Interactive map of Hororata
- Country: New Zealand
- Region: Canterbury
- Territorial authority: Selwyn District
- Ward: Malvern
- Community: Malvern
- Electorates: Selwyn; Te Tai Tonga (Māori)

Government
  - Territorial authority: Selwyn District Council
  - Regional council: Environment Canterbury
  - Mayor of Selwyn: Lydia Gliddon
  - Selwyn MP: Nicola Grigg
  - Te Tai Tonga MP: Mananui Ramsden

Area
  - Total: 1.17 km^{2} (0.45 sq mi)

Population (June 2025)
  - Total: 230
  - Density: 200/km^{2} (510/sq mi)
- Time zone: UTC+12 (New Zealand Standard Time)
  - Summer (DST): UTC+13 (New Zealand Daylight Time)
- Area code: 03

Hororata is a village at the northwestern edge of the Canterbury Plains in the South Island of New Zealand. It is located 15 kilometres southwest of Darfield, five kilometres south of Glentunnel, and 50 kilometres west of Christchurch, on the banks of the Hororata River. Hororata, when translated from Maori means "drooping rātā". There are a large number of rātā growing in the district.

== History ==
Hororata developed as a village to service the local farming community. In the early 1900s, the village had all the services that a small town would expect. These include a hotel, a Presbyterian and an Anglican church, stores, a school, post office, flour mill and a brewery. There was a large blacksmiths shop with a total of five forges.

Early European New Zealand pioneer John Studholme and his wife lived at Terrace Station on Milnes Road before selling the run to John Hall. New Zealand 19th century Premier John Hall and his eldest brother George Williamson Hall are buried in the St. John cemetery.

On 4 September 2010, an earthquake struck the surrounding region with a moment magnitude of 7.1 at 4:35 am local time. It had a maximum perceived intensity of X (Extreme) on the Mercalli intensity scale. The earthquake caused widespread damage and several power outages.

In May 2021, the Hororata Golf Course was damaged by flooding, with it being "largely unrecognisable" as a result. It is thought that it would take weeks to repair the damage caused by the Selwyn river breaching its banks.

== Demographics ==
Hororata is described by Stats NZ as a rural settlement, and covers 1.17 km^{2} (0.45 sq mi). It had an estimated population of 230 as of June 2025, with a population density of 197 people per km^{2}. It is part of the statistical area of Glenroy-Hororata.

Historical population
Year	Pop.	±% p.a.
2006	174	—
2013	180	+0.49%
2018	204	+2.53%
2023	222	+1.71%

Hororata had a population of 222 in the 2023 New Zealand census, an increase of 18 people (8.8%) since the 2018 census, and an increase of 42 people (23.3%) since the 2013 census. There were 117 males and 102 females in 93 dwellings. 1.4% of people identified as LGBTIQ+. The median age was 37.5 years (compared with 38.1 years nationally). There were 42 people (18.9%) aged under 15 years, 51 (23.0%) aged 15 to 29, 102 (45.9%) aged 30 to 64, and 27 (12.2%) aged 65 or older.

People could identify as more than one ethnicity. The results were 95.9% European (Pākehā), 10.8% Māori, 1.4% Pasifika, and 1.4% Asian. English was spoken by 94.6%, Māori by 1.4%, and other languages by 5.4%. No language could be spoken by 4.1% (e.g. too young to talk). The percentage of people born overseas was 13.5, compared with 28.8% nationally.

Religious affiliations were 9.5% Christian, 1.4% Māori religious beliefs, 1.4% New Age, and 1.4% other religions. People who answered that they had no religion were 75.7%, and 12.2% of people did not answer the census question.

Of those at least 15 years old, 21 (11.7%) people had a bachelor's or higher degree, 102 (56.7%) had a post-high school certificate or diploma, and 45 (25.0%) people exclusively held high school qualifications. The median income was $49,400, compared with $41,500 nationally. 15 people (8.3%) earned over $100,000 compared to 12.1% nationally. The employment status of those at least 15 was 111 (61.7%) full-time, 24 (13.3%) part-time, and 6 (3.3%) unemployed.

=== Glenroy-Hororata ===
Glenroy-Hororata statistical area covers 644.26 km^{2} (248.75 sq mi). It had an estimated population of 1,280 as of June 2025, with a population density of 2.0 people per km^{2}.

Historical population
Year	Pop.	±% p.a.
2006	987	—
2013	1,086	+1.37%
2018	1,194	+1.91%
2023	1,200	+0.10%

Glenroy-Hororata had a population of 1,200 in the 2023 New Zealand census, an increase of 6 people (0.5%) since the 2018 census, and an increase of 114 people (10.5%) since the 2013 census. There were 627 males, 573 females, and 3 people of other genders in 474 dwellings. 1.8% of people identified as LGBTIQ+. The median age was 38.6 years (compared with 38.1 years nationally). There were 246 people (20.5%) aged under 15 years, 213 (17.8%) aged 15 to 29, 573 (47.8%) aged 30 to 64, and 168 (14.0%) aged 65 or older.

People could identify as more than one ethnicity. The results were 86.2% European (Pākehā); 7.0% Māori; 0.2% Pasifika; 8.8% Asian; 1.2% Middle Eastern, Latin American and African New Zealanders (MELAA); and 6.0% other, which includes people giving their ethnicity as "New Zealander". English was spoken by 96.2%, Māori by 1.8%, and other languages by 9.5%. No language could be spoken by 2.8% (e.g. too young to talk). New Zealand Sign Language was known by 0.2%. The percentage of people born overseas was 18.2, compared with 28.8% nationally.

Religious affiliations were 30.2% Christian, 1.0% Hindu, 0.8% Islam, 0.2% Māori religious beliefs, 0.8% Buddhist, 0.2% New Age, and 1.5% other religions. People who answered that they had no religion were 57.2%, and 7.8% of people did not answer the census question.

Of those at least 15 years old, 180 (18.9%) people had a bachelor's or higher degree, 570 (59.7%) had a post-high school certificate or diploma, and 204 (21.4%) people exclusively held high school qualifications. The median income was $47,200, compared with $41,500 nationally. 81 people (8.5%) earned over $100,000 compared to 12.1% nationally. The employment status of those at least 15 was 570 (59.7%) full-time, 159 (16.7%) part-time, and 9 (0.9%) unemployed.

== Notable buildings ==
=== Cotons' Cottage ===
Originally home to Bentley Coton and his wife Sarah Jane Coton. It was built in approximately 1864. It contains five rooms (including an attic bedroom). It was home to local church services prior to the school taking over this role in 1875. It suffered partial collapse in the 2010 Darfield earthquake, and was then rebuilt and reopened to the public in March 2014. It had been previously restored by members of the Hororata Historical Society in the 1970s. It currently operates as part of the Hororata Museum It was listed as a category 2 historic place in 1983.

=== Hororata Pub ===
The Hororata Pub sits across the road from the Hororata Domain. It was built in 1873 by Edwin Derrett with the second story being added at a later date. It was refurbished in 1967. The Hororata pub was closed immediately after the Canterbury earthquakes due to the damage it sustained. It is now a private dwelling.

=== St John's Church ===
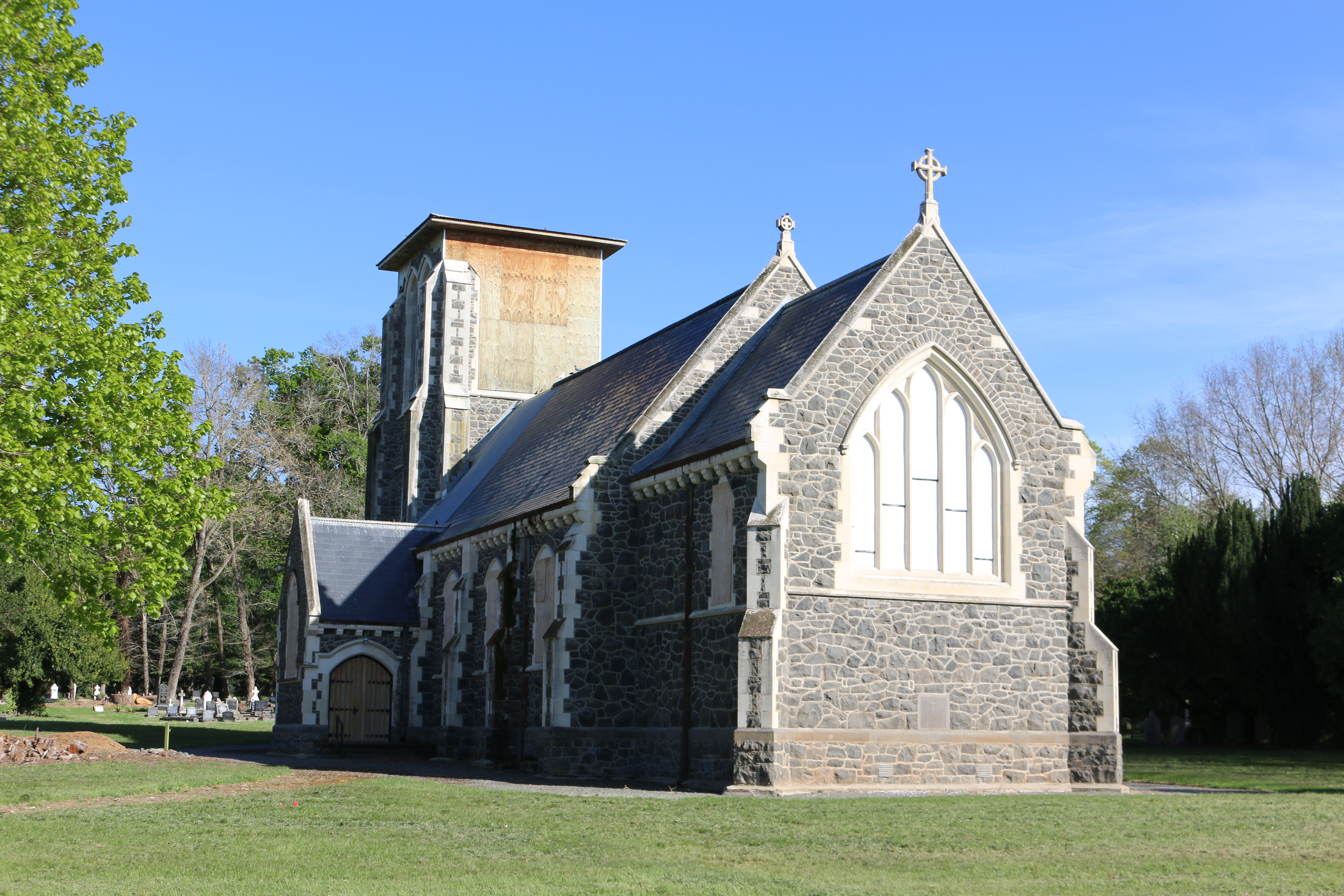
St Johns Church, Hororata (October 2020)

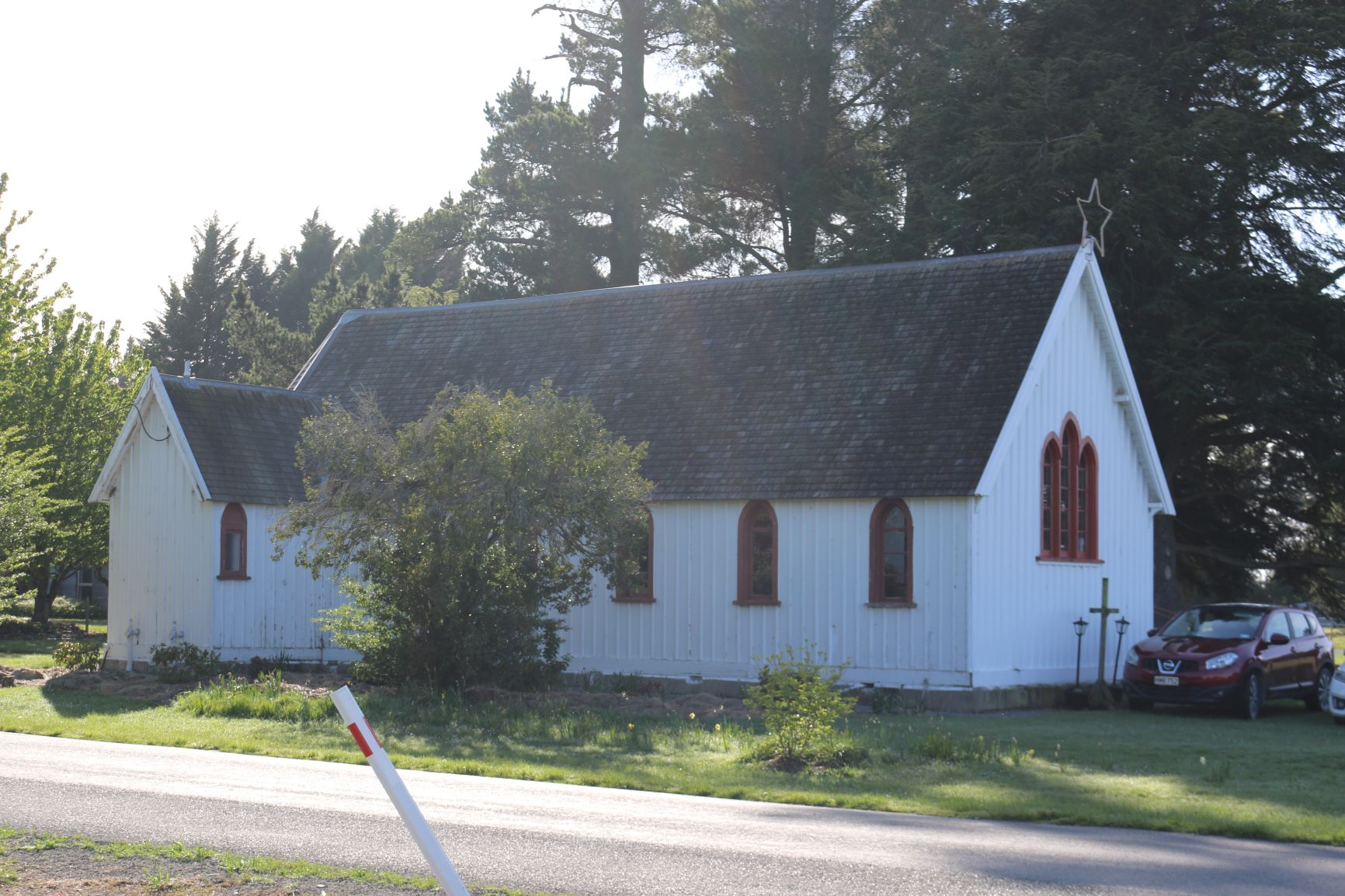
The original St Johns Church. Built in 1875 and once again used for church services following the 2010–11 Canterbury earthquakes

Hororata sustained some damage in the 2010 Canterbury earthquake. The settlement's most prominent building, the Anglican church of St. John, was completed in 1911. This was badly affected by the earthquakes with part of its tower collapsed onto the church's roof. The original 1875 wooden church sits across the road from the 1911 structure.

Across the road from the church is Te Waiora Christian Retreat Centre which was rebuilt as a result of the Canterbury earthquakes.

=== Fairview ===
This cob house and cottage were built near Hororata in 1885. They are surrounded by several acres of gardens and a pond. Tours run occasionally of the house and gardens throughout the year.

=== Terrace Station ===
This large farmhouse has a category one registration with Heritage New Zealand. The building started in the mid-1850s with timber pre-cut from Australia making the first three rooms. Successive rooms were added between 1863 and 1897. The large woolshed, built in 1868, has a category 2 registration from the New Zealand Historic Places Trust. Other farm buildings of note include the managers house and the blacksmiths.

== Hororata Highland Games ==
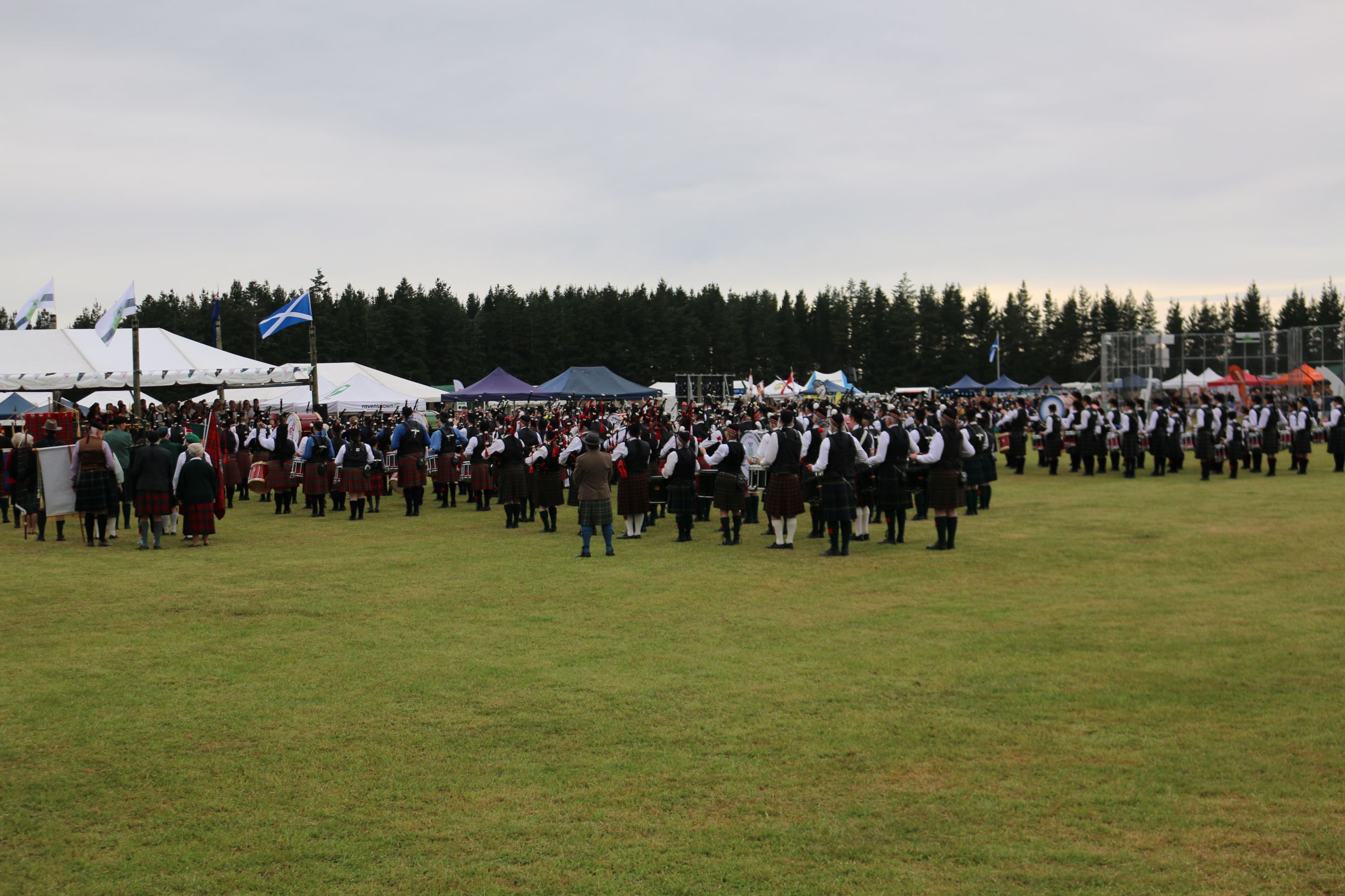
Pipe Bands at the opening of the 2020 Hororata Highland Games

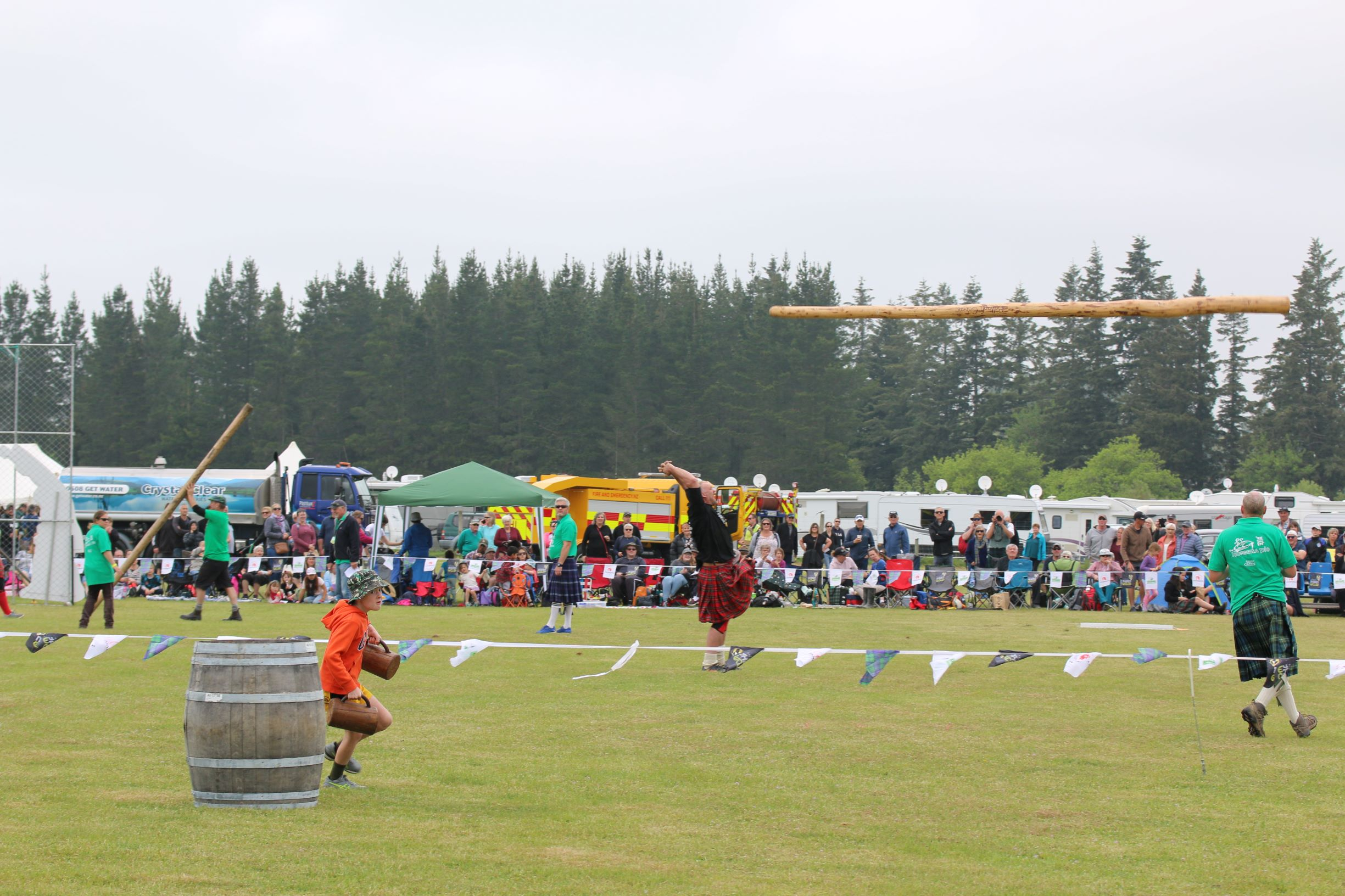
Competitors in the senior and junior competitions strive to win.

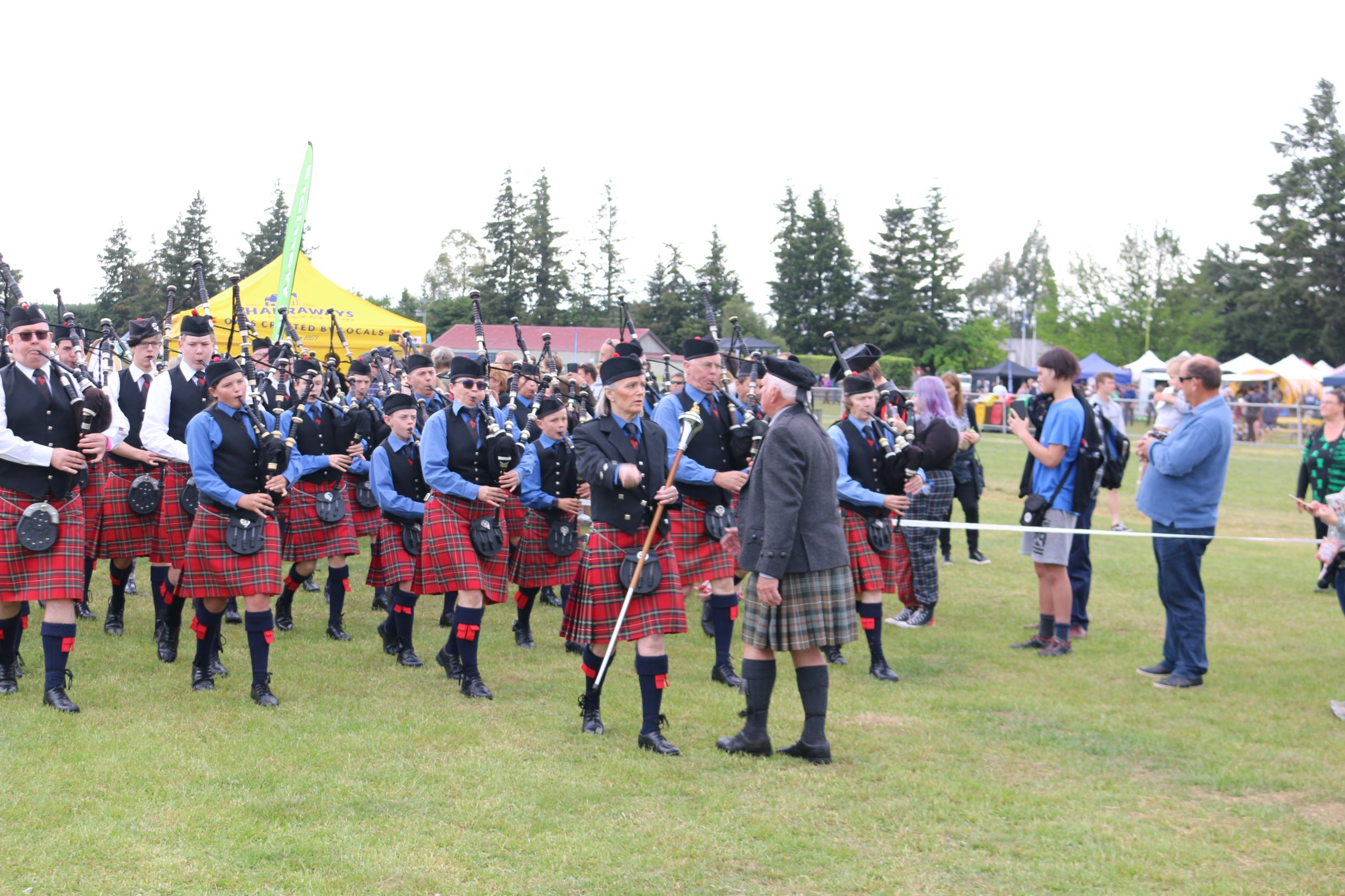
Pipe bands performing on the Hororata Domain during the Hororata Highland Games, (November 2020)

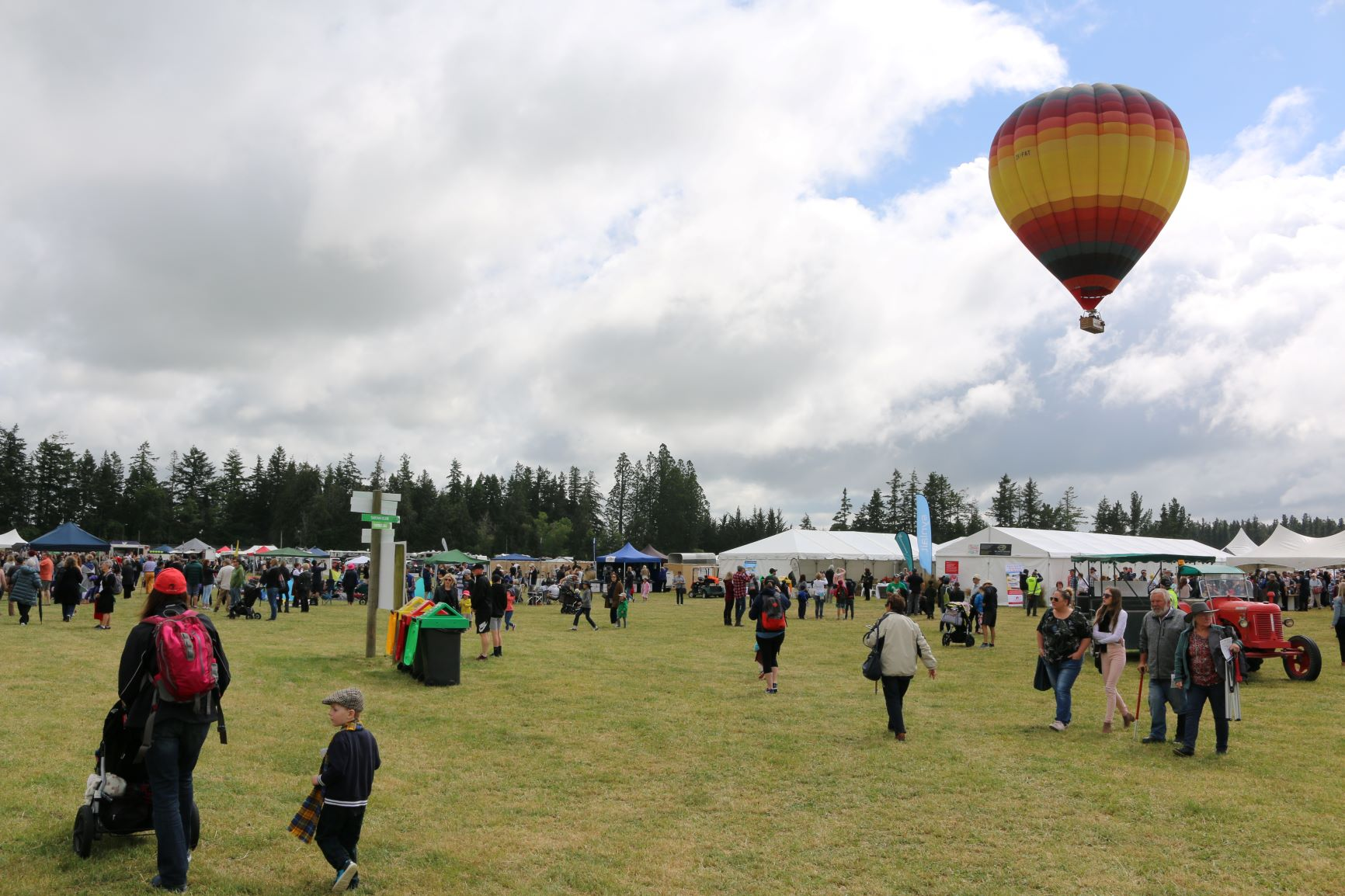
A hot air balloon at the Hororata Highland Games (2017)

The Hororata Highland Games started in 2011. The Hororata community had a desire to make a positive change following the damage of the Canterbury earthquakes. The annual event has increased in popularity with 10,000 people coming to the 2016 edition. It has become New Zealand's biggest Scottish festival. The event has over 300 competitors turn up each year. Competitions include Highland Dancing, Piping and Drumming, Tug O’ War and Scottish heavy athletics (men's and women's) which include the hammer throw, the sheaf toss, the Hororata stones and tossing the caber. The Kilted mile is a race over a mile which includes eating a Hororata Pie, Drinking a traditional Scottish drink and negotiating a series of obstacles. There are also stalls, food vendors and a fairground each year. A study conducted by the University of Canterbury looked at the economic benefits of the Hororata Highland Games. This found that they provided $370,000 to the Selwyn District economy in 2019.

=== Chieftain ===
There is a Chieftain for each games who presides over the opening ceremony. These have included:

- 2011: Simon Dallow
- 2012: Gerry Brownlee (MP for Ilam, Minister for Christchurch)
- 2013: Sir Jerry Mateparae (Governor-General)
- 2014: Sir Bob Parker (Mayor of Christchurch)
- 2015: Alex Bruce (Director of Adelphi Distillery, Scotland)
- 2016: Kyle Warren (Bagpipe musician)
- 2017: Amy Adams (MP for Selwyn)
- 2018: Patrick Hellier (Highland Games Heavy athlete)
- 2019: Peri Drysdale
- 2020: John de Vries
- 2022: Kate Foster (local historian)

=== Hororata tartan ===
Hororata has its own tartan which was created to celebrate the inaugural Hororata Highland Games. The Scottish Tartans Authority donated the design and the first 30 metres of cloth to Hororata. The tartan includes six colours all of which have local meanings: The red represents the colour of the rata flower. The white is the snow and the blue the local rivers of the area. The green is for the grass and Pounamu. Finally the three local schools colours were included: black and yellow (Hororata School), black and blue (Glentunnel School) and white and green (Windwhistle School).

== Hororata Night Glow ==
The Hororata Night Glow is an annual event held in winter. Hot air balloons light up in the evening and light up the night sky. The event is held at the Hororata Domain. The Hororata Highland Games and the Hororata Night Glow were successful in bringing approximately 25,000 people to Hororata in 2019.

== Climate ==
The warmest months of the year are January and February, with an average high temperature of 22 °C. The coldest month of the year occurs in July, when the average high temperature is 10 °C. Monthly rainfall ranges between an average of 35mm in January to 62mm in July.

Climate data for Hororata (1971–2000 normals, extremes 1960–2002, 2011)
Month	Jan	Feb	Mar	Apr	May	Jun	Jul	Aug	Sep	Oct	Nov	Dec	Year
Record high °C (°F)	35.4 (95.7)	38.0 (100.4)	33.0 (91.4)	30.2 (86.4)	24.5 (76.1)	22.3 (72.1)	22.0 (71.6)	21.4 (70.5)	26.5 (79.7)	29.6 (85.3)	31.2 (88.2)	32.7 (90.9)	38.0 (100.4)
Mean maximum °C (°F)	32.6 (90.7)	32.7 (90.9)	29.5 (85.1)	26.7 (80.1)	22.0 (71.6)	18.5 (65.3)	17.5 (63.5)	18.7 (65.7)	22.2 (72.0)	25.4 (77.7)	27.5 (81.5)	29.7 (85.5)	33.6 (92.5)
Mean daily maximum °C (°F)	23.4 (74.1)	23.4 (74.1)	20.9 (69.6)	18.0 (64.4)	14.3 (57.7)	11.2 (52.2)	10.8 (51.4)	12.1 (53.8)	14.8 (58.6)	17.2 (63.0)	19.1 (66.4)	21.4 (70.5)	17.2 (63.0)
Daily mean °C (°F)	16.8 (62.2)	16.6 (61.9)	14.5 (58.1)	11.6 (52.9)	8.3 (46.9)	5.5 (41.9)	5.3 (41.5)	6.5 (43.7)	8.9 (48.0)	11.1 (52.0)	12.9 (55.2)	15.2 (59.4)	11.1 (52.0)
Mean daily minimum °C (°F)	10.1 (50.2)	9.8 (49.6)	8.0 (46.4)	5.2 (41.4)	2.3 (36.1)	−0.1 (31.8)	−0.2 (31.6)	0.9 (33.6)	3.0 (37.4)	5.0 (41.0)	6.6 (43.9)	9.0 (48.2)	5.0 (40.9)
Mean minimum °C (°F)	3.9 (39.0)	3.4 (38.1)	0.7 (33.3)	−1.1 (30.0)	−3.8 (25.2)	−5.3 (22.5)	−5.4 (22.3)	−4.7 (23.5)	−2.9 (26.8)	−1.4 (29.5)	0.2 (32.4)	2.4 (36.3)	−6.0 (21.2)
Record low °C (°F)	1.2 (34.2)	1.0 (33.8)	−3.2 (26.2)	−4.8 (23.4)	−7.1 (19.2)	−7.5 (18.5)	−8.4 (16.9)	−7.5 (18.5)	−5.4 (22.3)	−4.0 (24.8)	−2.7 (27.1)	0.0 (32.0)	−8.4 (16.9)
Average rainfall mm (inches)	65.5 (2.58)	58.8 (2.31)	74.0 (2.91)	64.2 (2.53)	72.5 (2.85)	58.9 (2.32)	66.7 (2.63)	72.0 (2.83)	53.0 (2.09)	83.7 (3.30)	53.0 (2.09)	73.7 (2.90)	796 (31.34)
Source: NIWA

== Education ==
The original Hororata school was located on the corner or Downs Road and Hororata Road and built in 1870. It was completely destroyed by fire on 17 February 1914. Hororata Primary School is Hororata's sole primary school. This was built on Bealey Road. The buildings were expanded significantly in 1952 and a further classroom was added in 1963 when the Te Pirita and Hororata schools were amalgamated. Hororata Primary caters for years 1 to 6 and has a roll of 71 as of July 2026.

== Government ==
Hororata is part of the Selwyn electorate. The Selwyn District Council provides local government services to Hororata.

== Recreation ==
Hororata has a domain, which includes duck ponds and a picnic area. It was established in 1877 thanks to the generosity of local land owners. A tennis court and a Scouts building are located in the domain as well. Large expansive fields are located there, which are primarily used for the Hororata Highland Games and the Hororata Night Glow. A horse riding track, a tennis court, a Scouts building, are also located in the domain. A walking track links the domain to St John's Church. Ice skating used to occur on the Edwardian lake at the Hororata Domain.

== Services ==
Hororata has a café and bar, petrol station and a fire station. Hororata also has a community centre where it houses a clothing shop.
