= 2010 Canterbury earthquake =

Earthquake in New Zealand

- Location within New Zealand
- UTC time: 2010-09-03 16:35:47
- ISC event: 15155483
- USGS-ANSS: ComCat
- Local date: 4 September 2010
- Local time: 04:35 NZST
- Magnitude: 7.1 M_{w}
- Depth: 10 km (6.2 mi)
- Epicentre: 43.55°S 172.18°E near Darfield, Canterbury
- Areas affected: New Zealand
- Max. intensity: MMI X (Extreme)
- Peak acceleration: 1.26 g
- Aftershocks: ~17,600 (as of early August 2016)
- Casualties: 2 dead, over 1,700 injured

The 2010 Canterbury earthquake (also known as the Darfield earthquake) struck the South Island of New Zealand with a moment magnitude of 7.1 at 4:35 am local time on 4 September, and had a maximum perceived intensity of X (Extreme) on the Mercalli intensity scale. Some damaging aftershocks followed the main event, the strongest of which was a magnitude 6.3 shock known as the Christchurch earthquake that occurred nearly six months later on 22 February 2011. Because this aftershock was centred very close to Christchurch, it was much more destructive and resulted in the deaths of 185 people.

The earthquake on 4 September caused widespread damage and several power outages, particularly in the city of Christchurch, New Zealand's second largest city at that time. Two residents were seriously injured, one by a collapsing chimney and a second by flying glass. At least two people died and over 1,700 were injured. Mass fatalities were avoided partly due to there being few houses of unreinforced construction, although this was also aided by the quake occurring during the early hours of the morning when most people were off the street.

The earthquake's epicentre was 40 kilometres (25 mi) west of Christchurch, close to the town of Darfield. The hypocentre was at a depth of 10 km. A foreshock of roughly magnitude 5.8 hit five seconds before the main quake, and strong aftershocks were reported, up to magnitude 5.4. The quake was felt as lasting up to 40 seconds, and was felt widely across the South Island, and in the North Island as far north as New Plymouth. As the epicentre was on land away from the coast, no tsunami occurred.

The National Crisis Management Centre in the basement of the Beehive in Wellington was activated, and Civil Defence declared a state of emergency for Christchurch, the Selwyn District, and the Waimakariri District, while Selwyn District, Waimakariri and Timaru activated their emergency operation centres. Initially, a curfew was established for parts of Christchurch Central City from 7 pm to 7 am in response to the earthquake. The New Zealand Army was deployed to the worst affected areas in Canterbury.

Insurance claims totalled between NZ$2.75 and $3.5 billion, although it is unclear how much cost can be attributed to each of the earthquake events in the 2010–2011 Canterbury earthquake sequence. The total estimated damage bill was up to $40 billion, making it the fifth-biggest insurance event in the world since 1953.

== Geology ==
=== Background ===
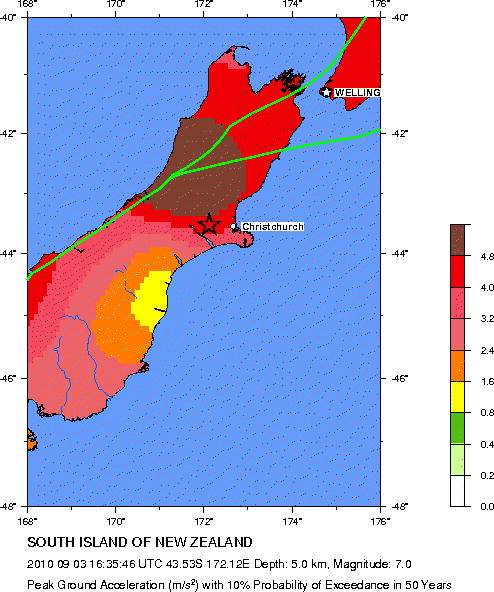
Seismic hazard near the epicentre

In the first eighty years of European settlement in Christchurch (1850–1930), four earthquakes caused significant damage, the last of these centred at Motunau on the North Canterbury coast in 1922.

Modelling conducted for the New Zealand Earthquake Commission (EQC) in 1991 found that earthquakes with a Mercalli intensity of VIII (significant property damage, loss of life possible) could recur on average in the Christchurch area every 55 years. The study also highlighted the dangers of soil liquefaction of the alluvial sediments underlying the city, and the likelihood of significant damage to water, sewer and power supply services.

Geologists have recognised about 100 faults and fault segments in the region, some as close as 20 km to central Christchurch. The closest faults to Christchurch capable of producing powerful earthquakes occur in the Rangiora-Cust area, near Hororata, and near Darfield. However, the 2010 quake ruptured the ground surface on a previously unknown fault and involved slip on up to seven individual faults.

=== Event ===
The main quake occurred as a result of strike-slip faulting within the crust of the Pacific plate, near the eastern foothills of the Southern Alps at the western edge of the Canterbury Plains. The earthquake epicentre was located about 80–90 km (50–56 mi) to the south and east of the current surface expression of the Australia–Pacific plate boundary through the island (the Alpine and Hope Faults). Though removed from the plate boundary itself, the earthquake likely reflects right-lateral motion on one of a number of regional faults related to the overall relative motion of these plates and may be related to the overall southern propagation of the Marlborough fault system in recent geologic time. The peak ground acceleration (PGA) measured was 1.26 g (12.36 m/s^{2}), recorded near Darfield. GNS scientists considered this an "extremely rare seismic recording made near a fault rupture". The February 2011 Christchurch earthquake experienced PGA of 1.51 g.

GNS seismologists and geophysicists, who believed the 7.1 M_{w} quake consisted of three or four separate quakes, quickly proposed at least two models for the quake. John Beavan proposed a four-fault model consisting of a 6.5 M_{w} quake on the Charing Cross fault, followed by a 7.0 M_{w} quake on the Greendale Fault, and a 6.2 M_{w} quake near Hororata, with a 6.5 M_{w} quake on the fourth fault, which could run between West Melton, Sandy Knolls and Burnham. Caroline Holden proposed a three-fault model, consisting of a 6.3 M_{w} quake of 2–4 seconds on the Charing Cross fault, followed by a 6.9 M_{w} quake lasting 7–18 seconds on the Greendale Fault, and an approximately 6.5 M_{w} quake of 15–18 seconds near Hororata. Ultimately, the event appears to have been an extremely complex earthquake that involved up to seven faults.

=== Aftershocks ===
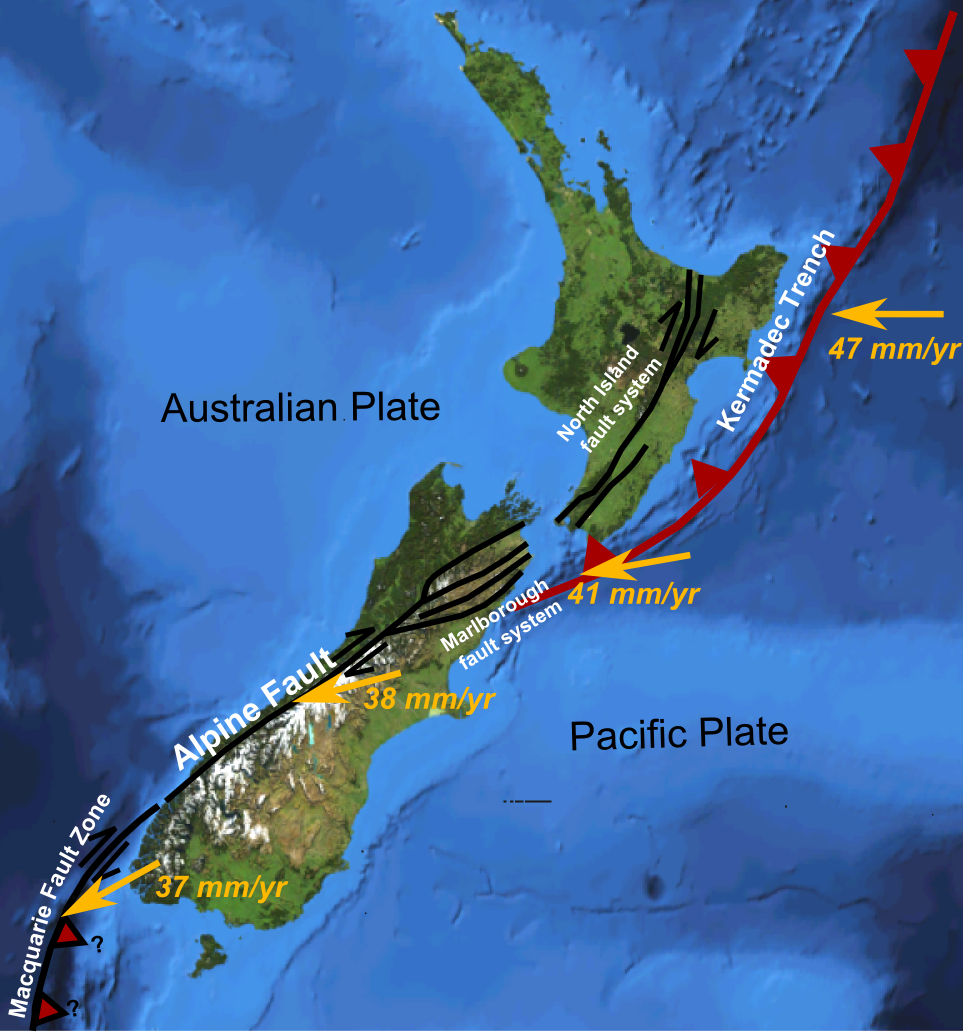
Major fault zones in New Zealand, with the plate boundary and relative motion of the Pacific plate shown

By 7 August 2012, the area had experienced 11,000+ recorded aftershocks of magnitude 2 or more, including 26 over 5.0 magnitude, and 2 over 6.0 magnitude. Many caused further damage to buildings in the Christchurch central business district, and some were felt as far away as 300 km to the south in Dunedin.

Notable aftershocks, in chronological order, include:

- On 8 September 2010 a 5.1 magnitude aftershock had an epicentre just 7 km from the Christchurch city centre.
- On 19 October 2010 a magnitude 5.0 aftershock with a depth of just 9 km caused surface shaking – reported at the time to be the worst since the original earthquake.
- On 26 December 2010, Boxing Day, a swarm of more than 32 shallow aftershocks, many centred directly under the city, occurred throughout the day, beginning with a 4.2 jolt at 2:07 am. The largest of these, the "Boxing Day aftershock", with a magnitude of 4.9, at a depth of 12 km below Opawa was felt very strongly. It caused further damage to at least 20 buildings, the closure of central Christchurch, and cut power to more than 40,000 residents for some time.
- On 20 January 2011 a magnitude 5.1 aftershock with a depth of 10 kilometres (6.2 mi) struck at 6:03 am, waking many residents. The shock caused some minor damage and was felt as far away as the West Coast and Oamaru.
- On 22 February 2011 an earthquake of magnitude 6.3 was centred at Heathcote Valley, 5 kilometres (3.1 mi) from Lyttelton and at a depth of 5 kilometres (3.1 mi). Seismologists regard it as an aftershock of the 2010 earthquake. Many buildings collapsed or were significantly damaged in the quake, among them Christchurch's iconic ChristChurch Cathedral. The earthquake resulted in 185 deaths.
- On 6 June 2011 a magnitude 5.5 aftershock with a depth of 15 km centred in Rolleston occurred at 9:09 am, causing power cuts and supermarket closures. The shock was felt widely in the South Island, with reports from as far south as Dunedin and as far north as Nelson. It was the sixth-largest aftershock since the magnitude 7.1 shake in September 2010.
- On 13 June 2011 a magnitude 6.3 earthquake struck Christchurch at a depth of 6 kilometres (3.7 mi). It was preceded by a magnitude 5.6 tremor, and affected many structures previously damaged by other earthquakes. The earthquake injured a total of 46 people, while many others were evacuated from the city centre.
- On 21 June 2011 a magnitude 5.4 aftershock with a depth of 8 km centred south-west of Halswell occurred at 10:34 pm. The shock was felt heavily in Christchurch, causing moderate-heavy content damage in western suburbs such as Upper Riccarton and Hornby. Halswell New World reported that more stock had fallen from shelves in this shake than in the 22 February and 13 June quakes.
- On 22 July 2011 a magnitude 5.1 aftershock with a depth of 12 km occurred at 5:39 am.
- 23 December 2011 featured another series of strong shocks, including a 5.8 at 1:58 pm and a 6.0 at 3:18 pm. The earthquakes interrupted power and water supplies, three unoccupied buildings collapsed and there was again liquefaction in eastern suburbs and rockfalls in hill areas. One person died after tripping on uneven ground caused by the earthquake.

== Geotechnical reports ==
The Earthquake Commission has published two Geotechnical Land Damage Assessment & Reinstatement Report[s]. The first Stage-1 report was published on 21 October 2010. The report briefly describes the mechanics of the earthquake, underlying geology, residential land damage assessment, reconstruction considerations, land and building reinstatement, and remediation options.

The second Stage-2 report was published on 1 December 2010. It divides the quake-affected areas into three zones, and outlines the remediation plans for these areas.

== Casualties, damage, and other effects ==
Most of the damage was in the area surrounding the epicentre, including the city of Christchurch, New Zealand's second-largest urban area with a population of 386,000. Minor damage was reported as far away as Dunedin and Nelson, both around 300–350 kilometres (190–220 mi) from the earthquake's epicentre.

The September 2010 earthquake caused two Christchurch residents to be seriously injured, one by a falling chimney and a second by flying glass, and led to many with less serious injuries. One person died of a heart attack suffered during the quake, with the coroner's report identifying the earthquake as being a contributing factor. Another person died after falling during the quake, although Coronial Services was unable to find the coroner's report for that death.

The subsequent 22 February 2011 aftershock caused a large number of deaths and casualties, along with significant damage to buildings and infrastructure.

=== Financial exposure ===
Total Earthquake Commission (EQC), private insurance and individual costs were estimated to reach as high as NZ$4 billion according to the New Zealand Treasury. Another projection of the cost covered by insurance (including EQC) was lower at $2.1 billion to $3.5 billion, but would still rank the quake as the world's fifth most costly to insurers.

The Earthquake Commission covers only domestic residences with private insurance and does not provide cover for businesses. The EQC payout is limited to the first $100,000 plus GST of any individual claim, with any amount above that covered by the insurance company holding the policy. The insurance companies themselves had limited or no exposure, having offloaded most of their risk to reinsurance companies. The EQC had reinsurance of $2.5 billion with a $1.5 billion excess, so its exposure was the first $1.5 billion and any amount after the first $4 billion. It had a total fund prior to this earthquake of approx $6 billion.

For comparison, the 1931 Hawke's Bay earthquake cost NZ£7 million, equal to approximately $650 million in 2010 dollars.

=== Effects in Christchurch ===
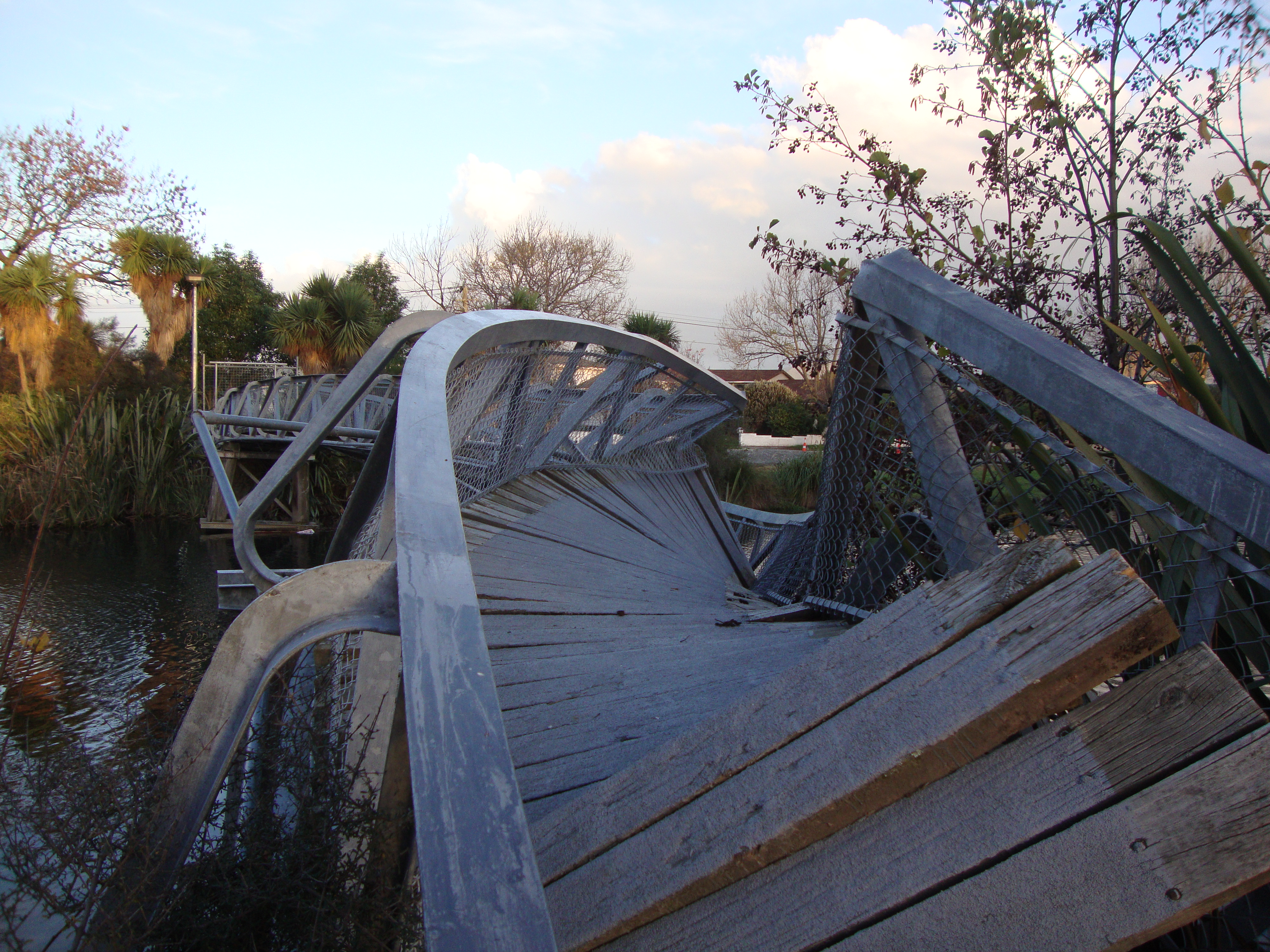
Medway footbridge over the Avon River

Reports of the quake's intensity in Christchurch generally ranged from V to VIII (Moderate to Severe) on the Modified Mercalli Intensity Scale. A strong smell of sulphur was widely reported in Christchurch following the earthquake. Sewers and water lines were damaged or broken. The water supply at Rolleston, located to the southwest of Christchurch, was contaminated. Power to up to 75 percent of the city was disrupted. Christchurch Hospital was forced to use emergency generators in the immediate aftermath of the quake. About 90% of the electricity in Christchurch had been restored by 6:00 pm the day of the earthquake. The repair of electricity was estimated to be more difficult in the rural areas. One building caught fire after its electricity was turned back on, igniting leaking LPG in the building. The fire was quickly extinguished by the Fire Service before it could spread. Damage to buried pipes may have allowed sewage to contaminate the residential water supply. Residents were warned to boil tap water before using it for brushing teeth, drinking, and washing or cooking food. Several cases of gastroenteritis were reported. By 7 September 28 cases had been observed at the city's welfare centres. The boil water notice for Christchurch and Banks Peninsula was lifted late on 8 September 2010, after more than 500 tests conducted over three days found no contamination.

Christchurch International Airport was closed following the earthquake and flights in and out of it cancelled. It reopened at 1:30 pm, following inspection of the terminals and main runway. All schools and early childhood centres in Christchurch City, Selwyn and Waimakariri Districts were ordered shut until Monday 13 September for health and safety assessments. The city's two universities, the University of Canterbury and Lincoln University, and the Christchurch campus of the University of Otago were also closed until 13 September awaiting health and safety assessments.

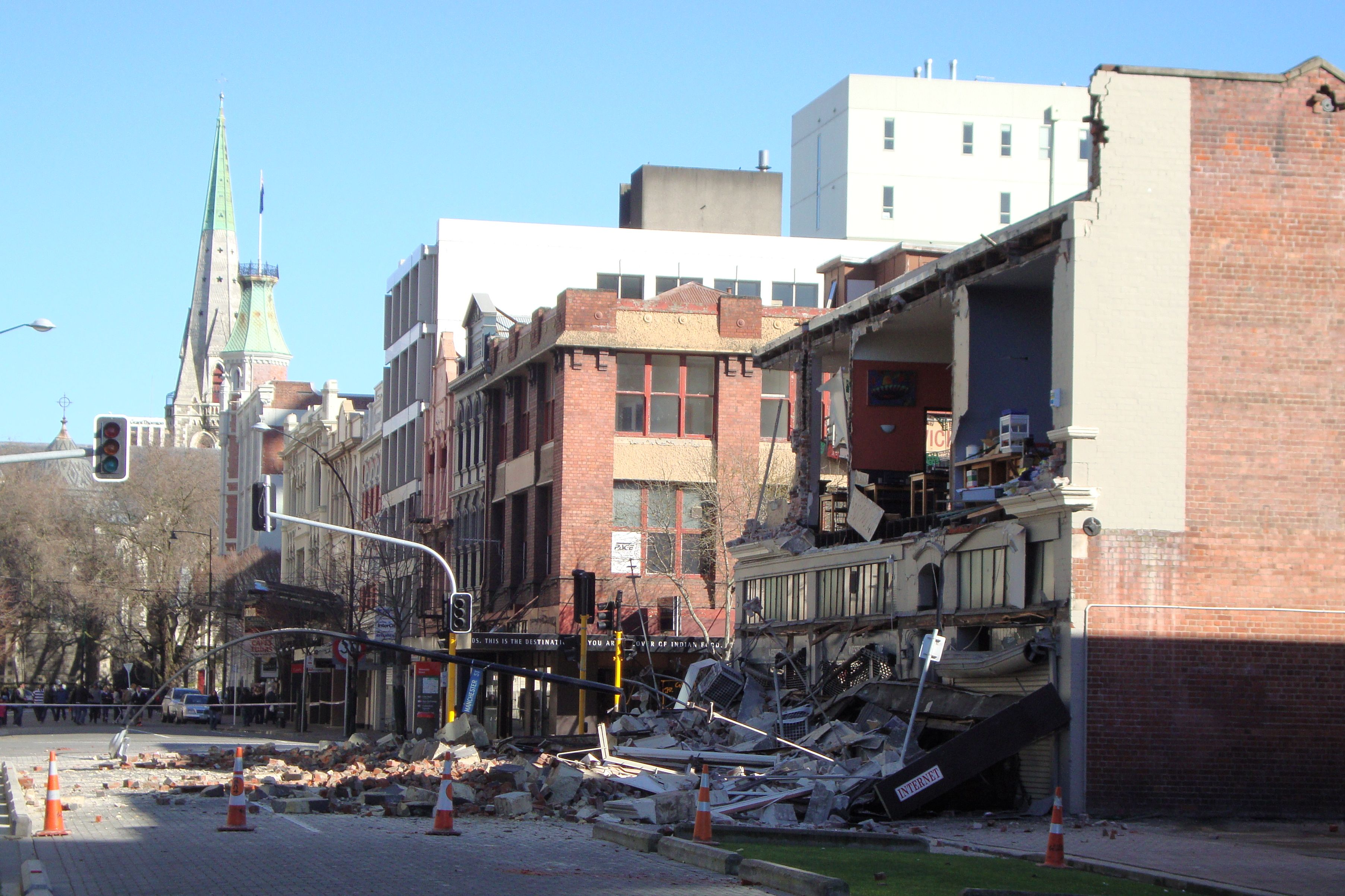
Building damage in Worcester Street, corner Manchester Street, with Christ Church Cathedral in the background

Crime in Christchurch decreased eleven percent compared with the previous year following the earthquake, although there were initial reports of looting in the city centre and "known criminals" trying to pass off as council workers to get into the central city cordon area. Police also observed a fifty-three percent rise in the rates of domestic violence following the earthquake. Many more heart attacks than usual were reported in the days following the quake. Usually the heart unit at Christchurch Hospital handles two to three heart attacks a day, but the rate had risen to eight to ten a day after the earthquake. A record number of babies for a Saturday were born at Christchurch Women's Hospital in the twenty-four hours after the quake, with the first baby arriving six minutes after the initial shock. This was at least in part due to outlying birthing centres being closed, pending structural checks, forcing more mothers to deliver at hospitals than was generally the case.

=== Effects outside Christchurch ===
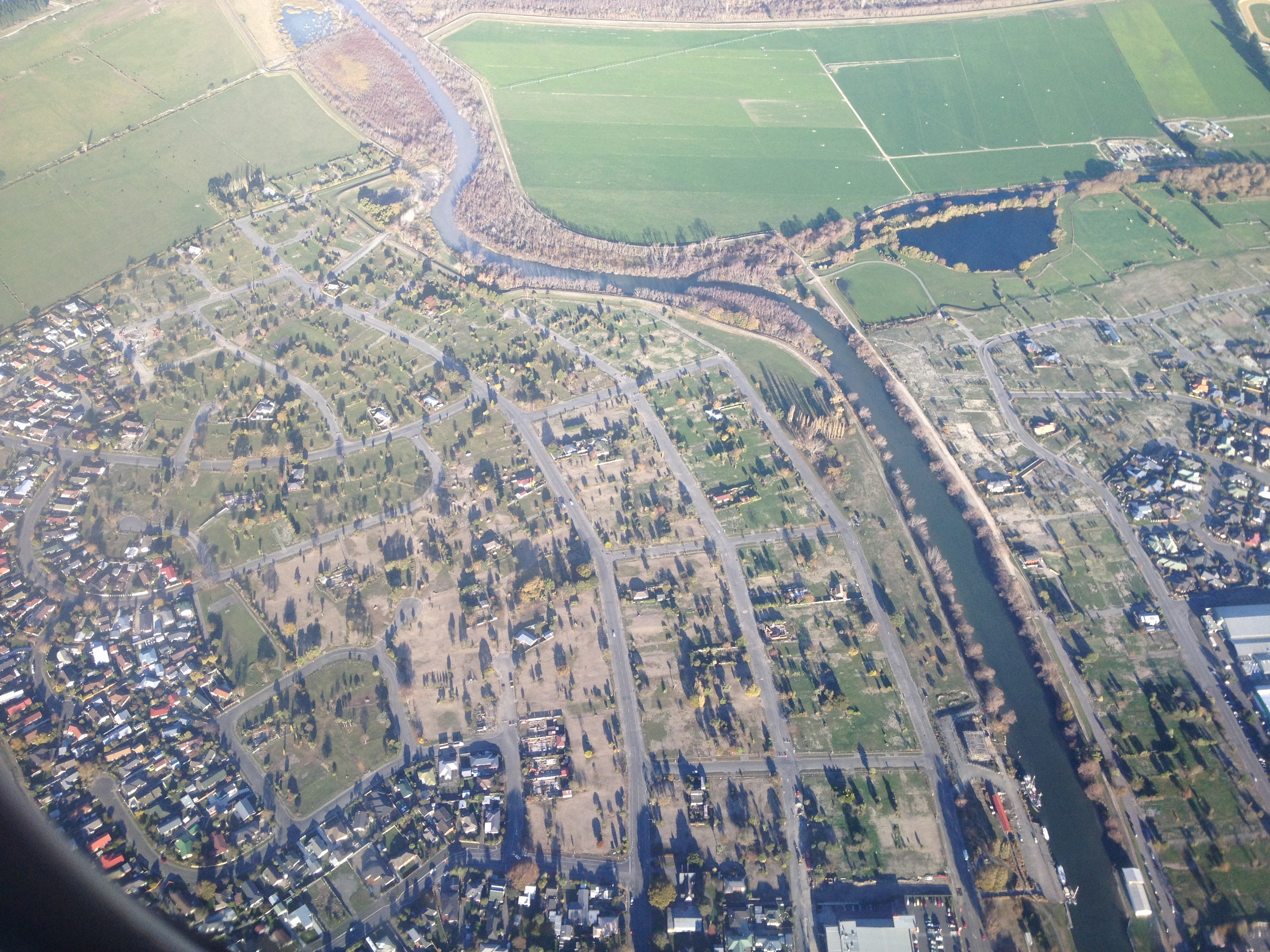
Central Kaiapoi suffered major damage; many of the town's buildings had to be bulldozed as a result of the 2010 earthquake and subsequent quake in February 2011.

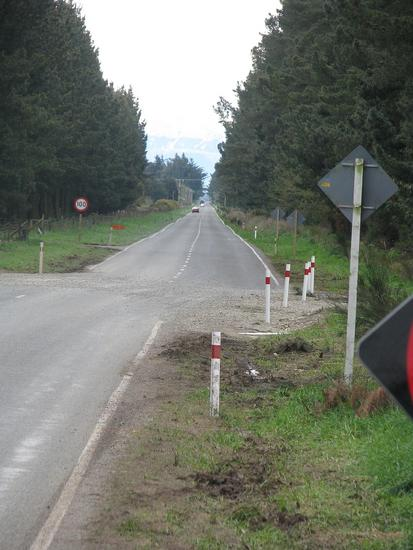
Displacement on Telegraph Road, near the intersection with Clintons Road

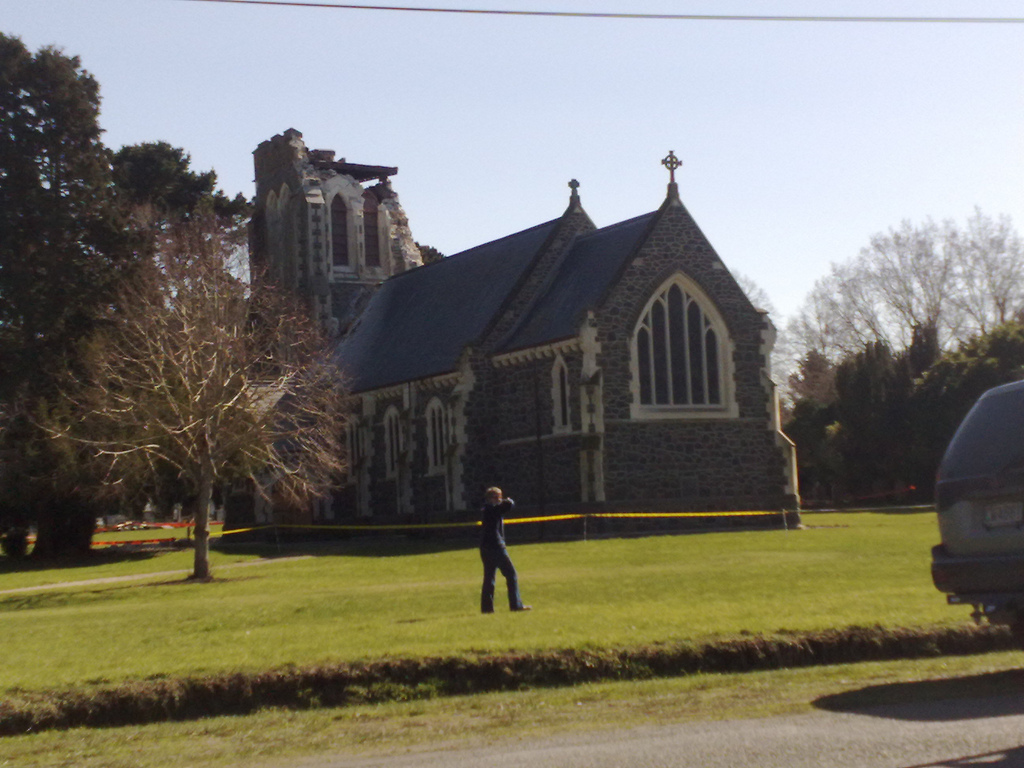
The tower of St John's Church, Hororata, was badly damaged in the quake, as were many other historic buildings.

The quake's epicentre was near Darfield, approximately 40 kilometres (25 mi) from Christchurch. Four metres (13 ft) of sideways movement has been measured between the two sides of the previously unknown fault.

In many towns outside Christchurch, the electrical grid was disrupted, with it taking an estimated two days to fully restore power to those affected. Power outages were reported as far away as Dunedin.

Access was restricted to over 350 homes in the town of Kaiapoi, of which about 100 were deemed unsafe. Some 22 commercial properties were deemed unsafe. Ron Keating, Mayor of Waimakariri District, stated that the town "will never be the same again". As noted above, damage to buried pipes may have allowed sewage to contaminate the residential water supply, and residents were warned to boil tap water before using it for brushing teeth, drinking, and washing or cooking food. A boil water notice for most of Selwyn District was lifted on 9 September. E. coli had been found in a water sample from Kaiapoi, and a boil water notice remained in effect for parts of Waimakariri District until 19 September.

A 5 km (3.1 mi) section of rail track was damaged near Kaiapoi and there was lesser track damage at Rolleston and near Belfast. As a precaution, state rail operator KiwiRail shut down the entire South Island rail network after the earthquake, halting some 15 trains. Two locomotives running light (i.e. without any carriages or wagons) came to a stop just 30 metres short of a major buckle in the line. After inspection, services south of Dunedin and north of Kaikōura recommenced at 10:30 am that day. The Main South Line, linking Christchurch with Dunedin, was given the all-clear and reopened, albeit with a 40 km/h speed restriction north of Ashburton, just after 6 pm to allow emergency aid, including 300,000 litres (70,000 imp gal; 80,000 US gal) of drinking water, to be railed into Christchurch. By the afternoon of Monday 6 September, the entire South Island rail network had reopened with the exception of the Main North Line between Rangiora and Addington. Freight was shuttled by road between the two points, while the TranzCoastal was replaced with a coach service.

Major bridges on state highways and the Lyttelton road tunnel were inspected by the NZ Transport Agency, and found to be in structurally sound condition. The only major road closure outside Christchurch was a slip in the Rakaia Gorge, blocking State Highway 77. The slip was partially cleared by 4 pm to allow a single lane of traffic through the site. Kaiapoi's main road was closed for a few days.

The quake caused damage to historic buildings in Lyttelton, Christchurch's port town, including cracks in a church and the destruction of parts of a hotel. The Akaroa area of Banks Peninsula came through the earthquake relatively unscathed, though there was some damage to the town's war memorial and hospital and some homes were extensively damaged. Duvauchelle Hotel was also seriously affected.

Surface rupture of the Greendale crossing Highfield Road

In Oamaru, 225 kilometres southwest of Christchurch, the earthquake caused part of a chimney on the St Kevin's College principal's residence to fall through the house, and caused the clock atop the Waitaki District Council building to stop at 4:36 am. The earthquake also caused the Dunedin Town Hall clock and the University of Otago clocktower to stop working in Dunedin, some 350 km away from the quake epicentre.

The earthquake was a wake-up call to many New Zealand residents. Two Dunedin supermarkets sold out of bottled water following the earthquake as people stocked up on emergency supplies. Major stores across the South Island were affected as their distribution centres in Christchurch were closed. Both The Warehouse and Progressive Enterprises (owners of Countdown), which have their sole South Island distribution centres in Christchurch, had to ship essential products to their South Island stores from the North Island, while Foodstuffs (owners of New World and Pak'n Save) had to ship to all their South Island stores from their Dunedin distribution centre.

=== Notable buildings ===
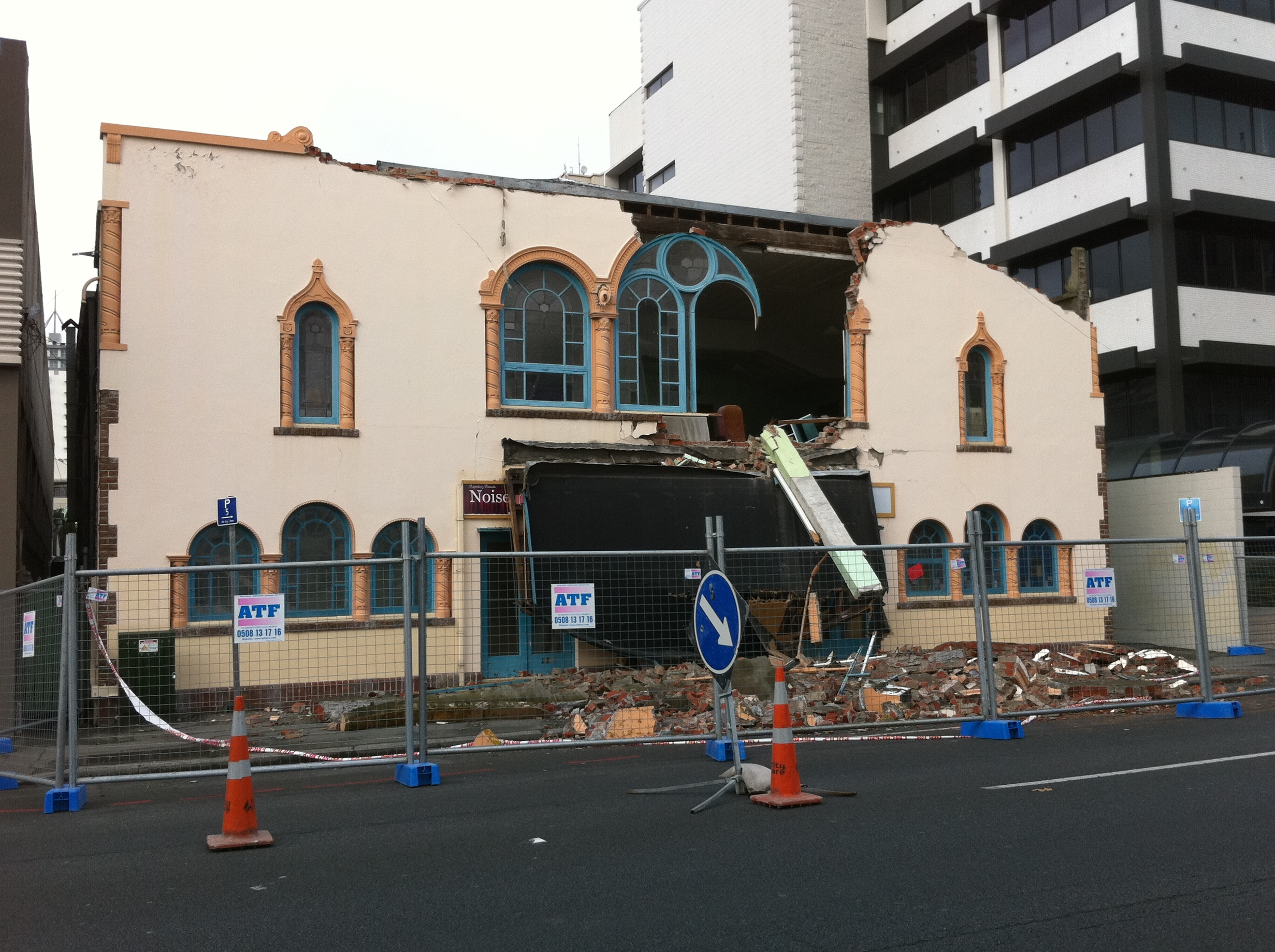
The façade of the Repertory Theatre was extensively damaged.

Many of the most badly affected structures in both Christchurch and the surrounding districts were old buildings, including several notable landmarks. Heritage New Zealand board member Anna Crighton said the earthquake had been "unbelievably destructive." The historic homesteads of Hororata and Homebush inland from Christchurch were both extensively damaged, as were Ohinetahi homestead and Godley House on Banks Peninsula. Homebush, located four kilometres from Glentunnel and only 15 kilometres from the earthquake's epicentre, was the historic home of the Deans family, one of the Canterbury Region's pioneer settler families, but was so extensively damaged that it has been described as being "practically in ruins".

The seven-storey Manchester Courts (or MLC Building), located at the busy intersection of Manchester and Hereford Streets, was extensively damaged. It was the tallest commercial building in Christchurch when it was built in 1905–06 for the New Zealand Express Company, and blended 1890s Chicago Skyscraper style with English Edwardian architecture. The building had a Category One Historic Places trust classification, but was deemed unsafe and was one of just two historic CBD buildings the City Council initially proposed for immediate demolition. That decision was reversed hours later when the building's owner proposed to dismantle the building over several weeks. Demolition began on 19 October 2010 and was continuing in late January.

The 1911 Anglican church of St. John's in Hororata, five kilometres south of Glentunnel, was extensively damaged when part of its tower collapsed. The port town of Lyttelton's most notable building, the 1876 Timeball station, was also affected by the earthquake, though strengthening work completed in 2005 may have saved it from further damage. In the later Christchurch earthquake in February 2011 the building was severely damaged, and it is planned by Heritage New Zealand for it to be dismantled, with the possibility of reconstruction.

The Valley Inn Tavern in Heathcote, built in 1877, survived the initial quake, but had to be torn down after the 5.1 magnitude aftershock on 8 September. Lincoln's historic 1883 public house, The Famous Grouse, was also irreparably damaged and was demolished within days of the earthquake.

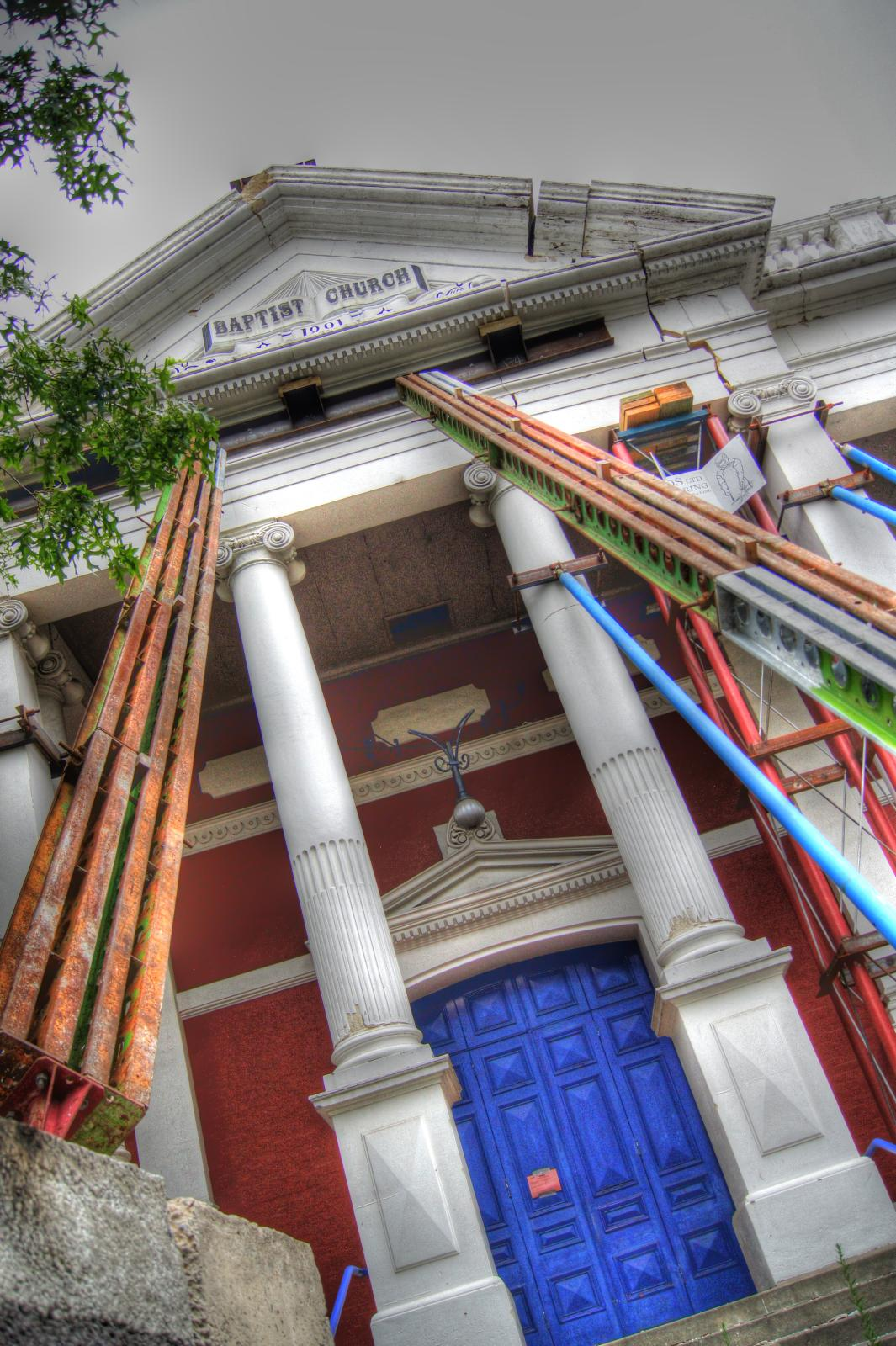
View of the Oxford Terrace Baptist Church after the 2010 Canterbury earthquake, with props holding the frontage up (It was later destroyed in the 22 February aftershock).

Many of Christchurch's major landmarks survived intact, including the Canterbury Provincial Council Buildings, the Anglican cathedral, and Christ's College. The Catholic Cathedral of the Blessed Sacrament (Christchurch Basilica) also survived, although it suffered severe structural damage and also had some windows broken. The central city's iconic Christchurch Press building also survived with only minor damage.

Most modern buildings performed as they were designed to do, preserving life rather than keeping the interior in good order. The City Council's own new Civic Building sustained some interior damage, mainly to fixtures and fittings that delayed it being reopened for a week. Others, such as the city's International Antarctic Centre and Christchurch Art Gallery, the latter of which served as the Civil Defence Headquarters during the earthquake aftermath, suffered little or no damage and were able to be used immediately.

Christchurch Arts Centre, housed in the former Canterbury College buildings, was less fortunate, with moderate damage to the Great Hall, the Clocktower, and the Observatory.

The structure of the University of Canterbury's buildings survived the earthquake, but its museum collection of Greek and Roman artefacts (the Logie Memorial Collection) was significantly damaged. Also, as many of the bookshelves in the main library were toppled, with repairs expected to take until Christmas, the university arranged electronic access to many academic publishers databases for students about to sit exams.

The Oxford Terrace Baptist Church, constructed 1881–1882, was extensively damaged. Several other Christchurch area churches also suffered serious damage, including St. Mary's Anglican church in Merivale, St. John's Anglican church in Latimer Square, and the Rugby Street Methodist church.

The city's Repertory Theatre, on Kilmore Street in the central city, was reported to be extensively damaged and may be beyond repair, however the Repertory Theatre website notes "Beneath the rubble the lower façade is intact with not even a broken window. Further into the theatre everything was undisturbed; the auditorium, stage area, fly tower and dressing rooms intact. The historic proscenium undamaged."

Several notable buildings in the Timaru area, 160 kilometres (99 mi) southwest of Christchurch, were also badly affected. A pinnacle on the tower of St Mary's Anglican Church tower fell to the ground, and the recently restored tower itself sustained "significant cracking". The spire of St. Joseph's Catholic Church in Temuka was also shifted 10 centimetres (4 in) by the earthquake, leaving it precariously balanced, and the town's historic Royal Hotel was also damaged.

Heritage experts urged building owners not to hastily demolish their buildings. The mayor warned of significant penalties for demolishing buildings without consent, and launched a fund to help repair historic buildings damaged by the quake. The Government allocated NZ$10 million towards restoration of such buildings a few days later.

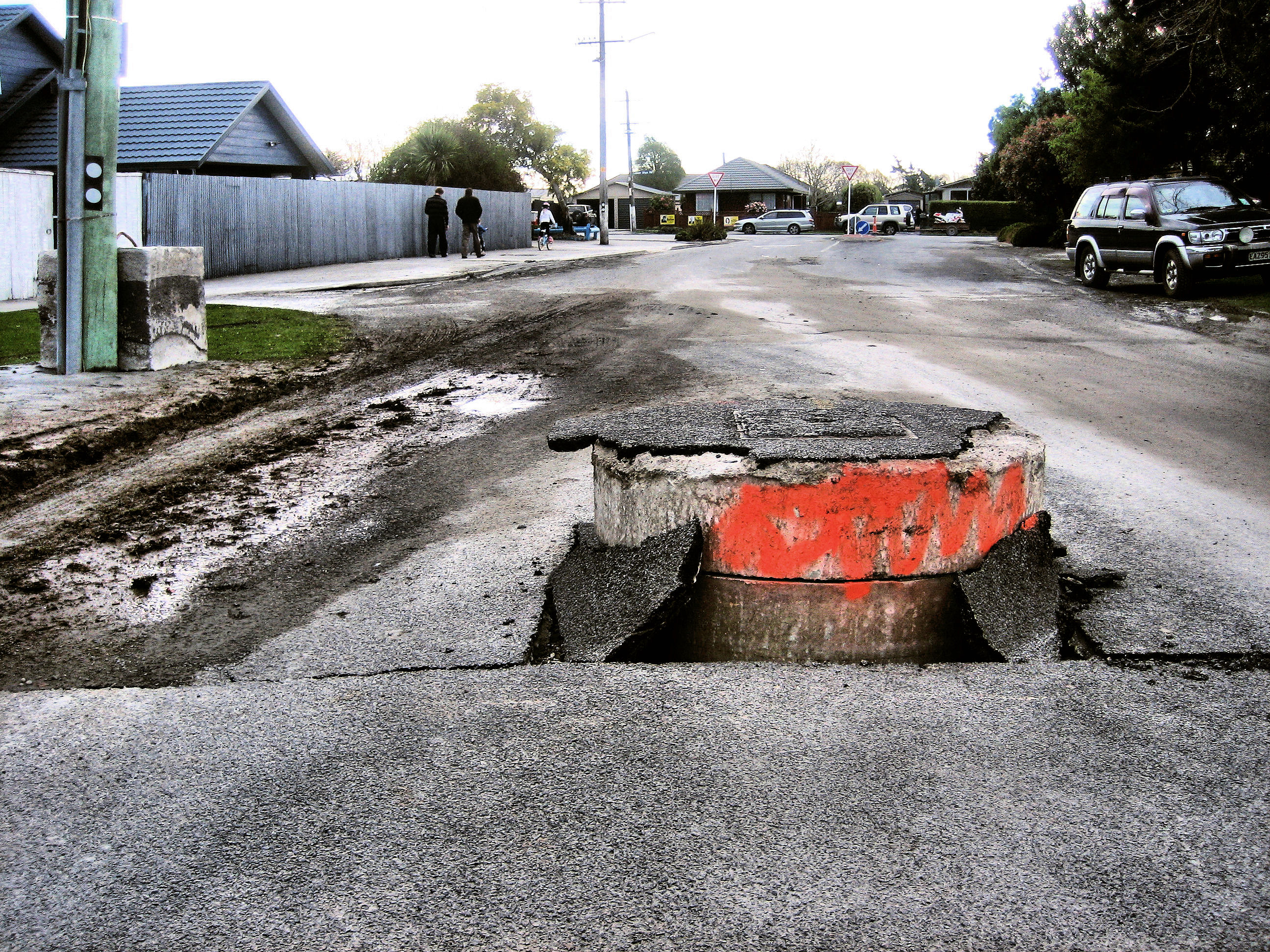
Storm drain emerges from a road in Brooklands

=== Liquefaction ===
A feature of the quake was the damage caused by soil liquefaction. This was particularly the case in the riverside areas of Avonside, Dallington, Burwood, Avondale, and Kaiapoi, and in river delta areas near Bexley, Brooklands, Spencerville, Pines Beach, and Kairaki, with other areas being affected to a substantially lesser degree or not at all. Damage from liquefaction may have been worsened by the high water table from a wet winter.

Liquefaction can also cause buried pipes to float up to the surface. This has caused problems for the gravity-fed sewer system, which may need to be completely rebuilt in some areas.

While the problem had long been well understood by planners, it is not clear that the public understood it as well, or that it widely influenced development, buying or building decisions. Liquefaction risk at the Pegasus Town site was identified in 2005, so the developers spent approximately $20 million on soil compaction, and the ground there held firm during the quake.

=== Relative lack of casualties ===
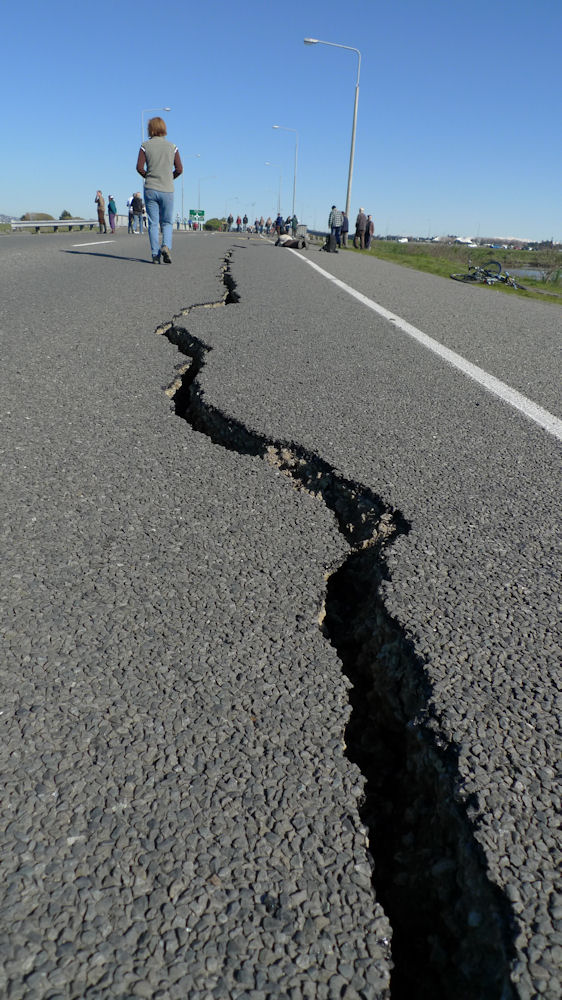
Crack in Bridge Street, South New Brighton

The media have remarked on the lack of casualties, despite the close parallels of the quake to incidents that have had devastating consequences in other countries, such as the 1989 San Francisco quake, which killed 63 people and was magnitude 7.1 also. The analysis especially compared the Canterbury quake with the 2010 Haiti earthquake, which also occurred in similar proximity to an urban area, also occurred at shallow depth under the surface, and was of very similar strength. Unlike the many tens of thousands of deaths in Haiti (with some estimates placing the death toll at one in ten or higher), only two deaths directly attributable to the earthquake were reported in New Zealand.

This was ascribed to the fact that the quake happened in the early hours of a Saturday morning, when most people were asleep in timber-framed homes, and "...there would almost certainly have been many deaths and serious injuries had it happened during a busy time of the day...". Another important factor was building practices which took earthquakes into account, starting after the 1848 Marlborough earthquake and the 1855 Wairarapa earthquake, both of which badly affected Wellington. These led to formal standards after the 1931 Hawke's Bay earthquake, which have since been progressively updated. By contrast, Haiti's much lower standard codes were poorly enforced and many buildings were made of hand-made non-reinforced concrete, which is extremely vulnerable to seismic damage. Ground shaking in populated areas of Canterbury was also generally less strong than for the Haiti quake.

== Emergency response and relief efforts ==
Christchurch's emergency services managed the early stages of the emergency as the Civil Defence organisation was activated. The St John Ambulance service had sixteen ambulances operational within half an hour of the earthquake and received almost 700 calls within the first 6 hours.

Isolated reports of looting also took place in the immediate aftermath of the earthquake, primarily relating to either young people or people struggling with addiction. Charges laid by police included looting of a sports bar, pharmacy, and a cafe, with charges ranging from community service to imprisonment.

A state of emergency was declared for Christchurch at 10:16 am on 4 September, and the city's central business district was closed to the general public. A curfew was put in place from 7 pm to 7 am for parts of the central business district. The New Zealand Army was deployed to help the police enforce the closure and curfew.

Civil Defence also declared a state of emergency for Selwyn District and Waimakariri District. The National Crisis Management Centre in the basement of the Beehive in Wellington was activated, while Selwyn District, Waimakariri and Timaru activated their emergency operation centres.

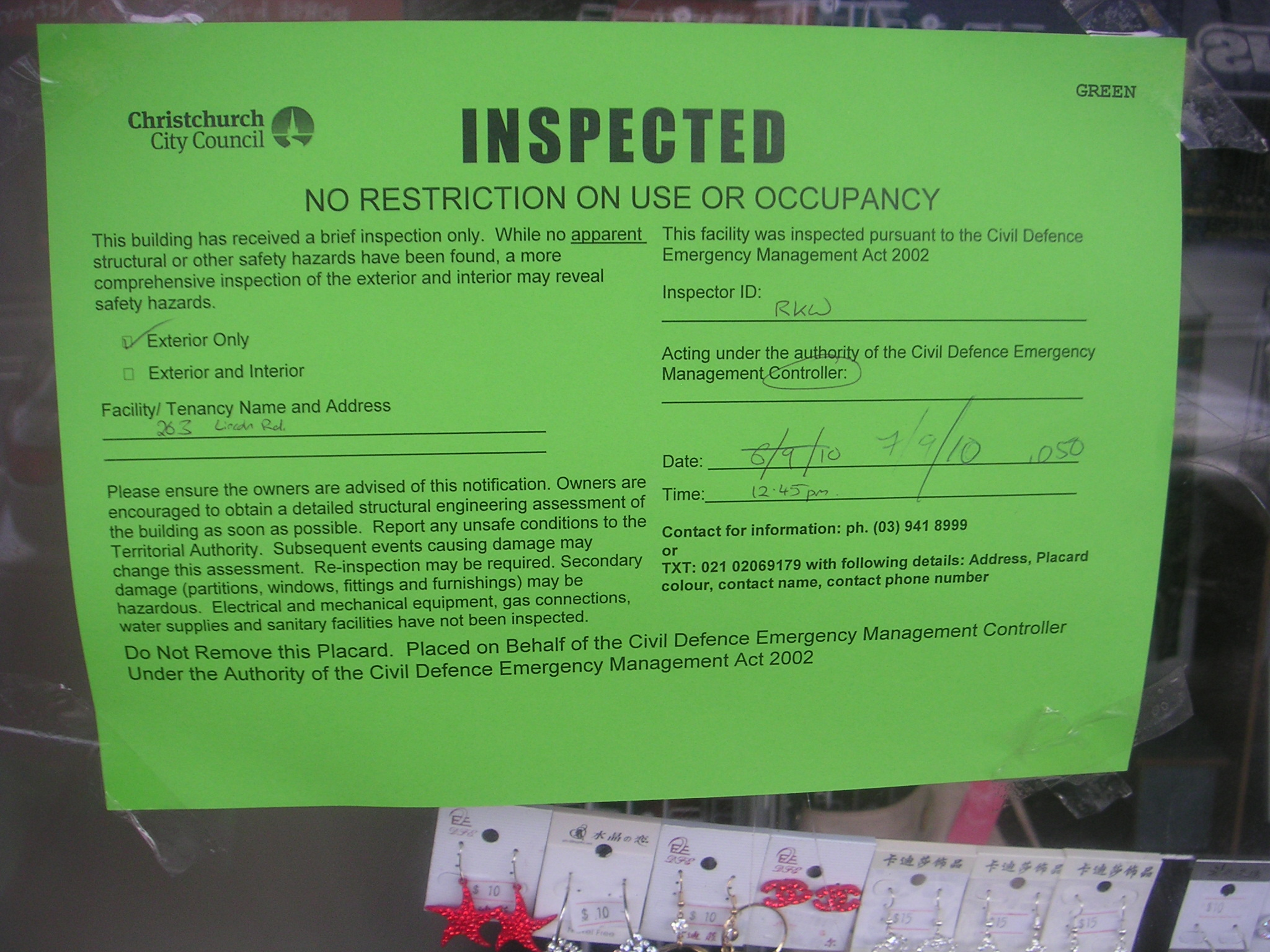
A structural inspection notice verifies a shop as safe for use

A Royal New Zealand Air Force C-130 Hercules plane brought 42 urban search and rescue personnel and three sniffer dogs from the North Island to Christchurch the day of the quake, to help check for people buried in the rubble and determine which buildings are safe to use. There were a large number of police and engineers present in the disaster areas. The New Zealand Army deployed personnel upon the request of the Christchurch mayor. Eighty police officers from Auckland were dispatched to Christchurch to assist with general duties there.

The United Nations contacted the New Zealand Government and offered its assistance. The United States military offered to send help from Hawaii; local authorities expressed gratitude for the offer, but turn it down saying they had matters under control. Queen Elizabeth II asked the Prime Minister to send her good wishes to the people affected by and helping recover from the quake.

Prime Minister John Key, who was raised in Christchurch, visited the scene of the devastation within hours of the earthquake. Christchurch mayor Bob Parker requested that the Prime Minister order the deployment of the New Zealand Army to keep stability and to assist in searches when possible within Christchurch, and the Prime Minister stated that the Army was on standby. New Zealand's Earthquake Commission, which provides government natural disaster insurance, had the role of paying out on claims from residential property owners for damage caused by the earthquake. On 7 September, John Key appointed Cabinet Minister, Leader of the House and MP for the Christchurch electorate of Ilam Gerry Brownlee as the Minister for Earthquake Recovery to oversee the response to the earthquake.

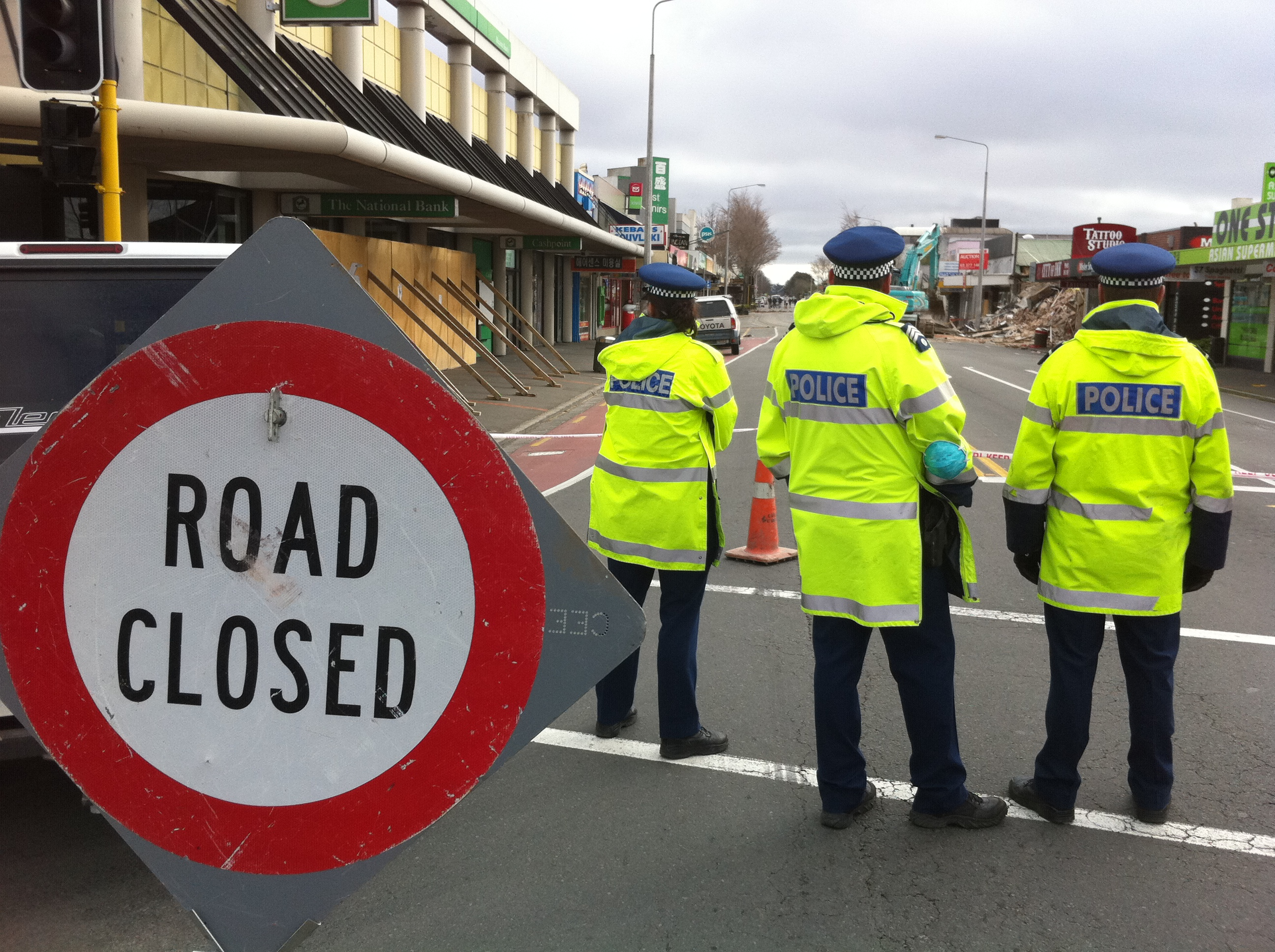
Police cordon in Riccarton Road during demolition of damaged buildings

'Welfare centres' were set up with the help of Red Cross, The Salvation Army and St. John Ambulance at Burnside High School, Linwood College and Addington Raceway, where over 244 people slept on the night after the quake. Tankers delivered drinking water to the welfare centres.

A joint mayoral relief fund was established by Selwyn District Council, Christchurch City Council and Waimakariri District Council, to which the government initially gave NZ$5 million. The Red Cross and The Salvation Army also appealed for donations to fund their own efforts.

Under the National-led Government the Canterbury Earthquake Response and Recovery Act was drafted and passed to assist reconstruction. The Act permitted Government ministers to suspend almost any New Zealand law and attracted criticism from New Zealand and international academics specialising in constitutional law, who claimed that it lacked constitutional safeguards and set a dangerous precedent for future natural disasters.

The response to the earthquake was praised by most citizens with 94% saying that Civil Defence had performed well and 90% saying the City Council had performed well.

The earthquake occurred five weeks to the day before the Christchurch local elections. Following the earthquake, the polls for the mayoral election swung from favourite Jim Anderton to incumbent Bob Parker. Parker went on to win the 9 October election with a majority 53.7% of the vote.

A benefit concert, Band Together, was held on 23 October 2010 at Hagley Park.

== See also ==
- 2016 Christchurch earthquake
- UC CEISMIC Canterbury Earthquakes Digital Archive
- Geology of Canterbury, New Zealand
- June 2011 Christchurch earthquake
- List of earthquakes in 2010
- List of earthquakes in New Zealand
- Memorials and services for the Canterbury earthquakes
