= Peri Drysdale =

New Zealander entrepreneur (born 1953)

Peri Drysdale MBE
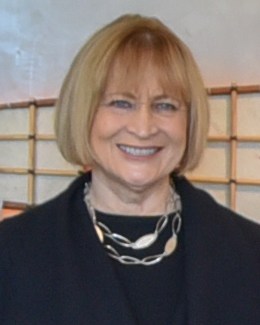
- Drysdale in 2021
- Born: Perilyn Richards; 18 March 1953 (age 73); Christchurch, New Zealand
- Known for: founder and CEO of "Snowy Peak" and "Untouched World" brands; founder of "Untouched World Foundation"
- Spouse: Alexander Drysdale (m. 1973)
- Children: 2

Perilyn Drysdale MBE (née Richards, born 18 March 1953) is a New Zealand entrepreneur and business owner. She is the founder and CEO of the fashion companies "Snowy Peak" and "Untouched World", which produce ecologically sustainable clothing, and the founder of the Untouched World Foundation, which runs programmes in sustainable leadership.

== Early life and family ==
Born in Christchurch on 18 March 1953, Drysdale grew up on a sheep station near the Rakaia Gorge in the South Island of New Zealand. She was educated at Craighead Diocesan School in Timaru and St. Margaret's College in Christchurch. She went on to train as a nurse, specialising in cardiology. In 1973, she married Alexander Drysdale, and the couple went on to have two children. She gave up nursing in 1979.

== Business career ==
While her children were young, Drysdale decided to start a home-based garment manufacturing business. She called it "Snowy Peak" and employed outworkers to knit luxury clothes such as jumpers, hats, scarves and gloves for supply to a few Christchurch stores. She started with 10 outworkers, and by 1985, after four years operation, she had 500 working for her.

Drysdale experimented with certified organic, eco-friendly wools and cottons. In 1996 she launched the world's first yarn that blended possum fur with merino wool, calling the new yarn "merinomink". She also began to export her clothes to Australia, Europe, Japan and Canada, expanded operations in Christchurch with a cafe and retail store, and opened stores in Auckland and Queenstown.

In 1999 the brand received international attention when it was chosen to provide garments for world leaders attending the Asia-Pacific Economic Cooperation Forum in Auckland. President Bill Clinton particularly admired his sweater, and he and his family became fans and customers.

In 2014, Drysdale began using a second new textile which she calls "kapua" - a mixture of cashmere, silk and possum - which had been in development since 2000.

== Charity foundation ==
In 2000, Drysdale founded the "Untouched World Foundation", a charitable trust which is focused on developing sustainable leadership in young people. One percent of the retail sales from Untouched World contribute to the foundation.

Since 2002, students involved in the programme have worked on a nature programme based at Blumine Island in the Marlborough Sounds. After several years' work the island achieved predator-free status and kiwi were released there in 2010.

== Recognition ==
- 1993 – appointed a Member of the Order of the British Empire in the 1993 New Year Honours, for services to manufacturing and export
- 1999 – included in list of 100 New Zealanders who have made the most significant contribution to the economy.
- 2002 – South Island Businesswoman of the Year Award
- 2002 – Snowy Peak won Most Ethical Company Award
- 2004 – Snowy Peak won Best Retailer Award
- 2005 – North & South magazine's "New Zealander of the Year" Award
- 2007 – honorary doctorate from Lincoln University (New Zealand)
- 2008 – Supreme Award at the World Class New Zealand Awards for her business achievements, work in showcasing New Zealand overseas and in recognition of her leadership in social and environmental sustainability issues.
- 2020 – inducted into the New Zealand Business Hall of Fame
