= Isitt =

Isitt is an English surname. It may refer to:

- Debbie Isitt, English director and writer
- Frank Isitt (1843–1916), New Zealand Methodist minister
- Kate Isitt (journalist) (1876–1948), New Zealand journalist and writer
- Kate Isitt, English actress
- Leonard Isitt (minister) (1855–1937), New Zealand Methodist minister and politician
- Sir Leonard Isitt (aviator) (1891–1976), New Zealand military aviator and administrator
