= 1860 Christchurch Country by-elections =

Two New Zealand by-elections

The 1860 Christchurch Country by-elections were two by-elections held in the Christchurch Country electorate in Canterbury in April and May 1860 following two resignations.

The Christchurch Country electorate was one of the original 24 electorates used for the 1st New Zealand Parliament in 1853 and existed until the end of the term of the 2nd New Zealand Parliament in 1860. It was a two-member electorate.

The first by-election on 2 April after the resignation of John Ollivier on 21 January 1860 resulted in the election unopposed of Isaac Cookson on 2 April.

The second by-election was held on 21 April after the resignation of John Hall on 10 March and resulted in the election of Charles Hunter Brown. John Ollivier nominated Brown and as he was the only candidate at the nomination meeting, he was thus declared elected unopposed. Brown's election was on 21 April and was gazetted at the end of May.
