= Isaac Cookson =

Isaac Cookson may refer to:

- Isaac Cookson (foundryman) (1679–1743), founder of the Cookson Group, UK
- Isaac Cookson (politician) (1817–1870), politician and merchant in New Zealand
