= Terrace Station Homestead =

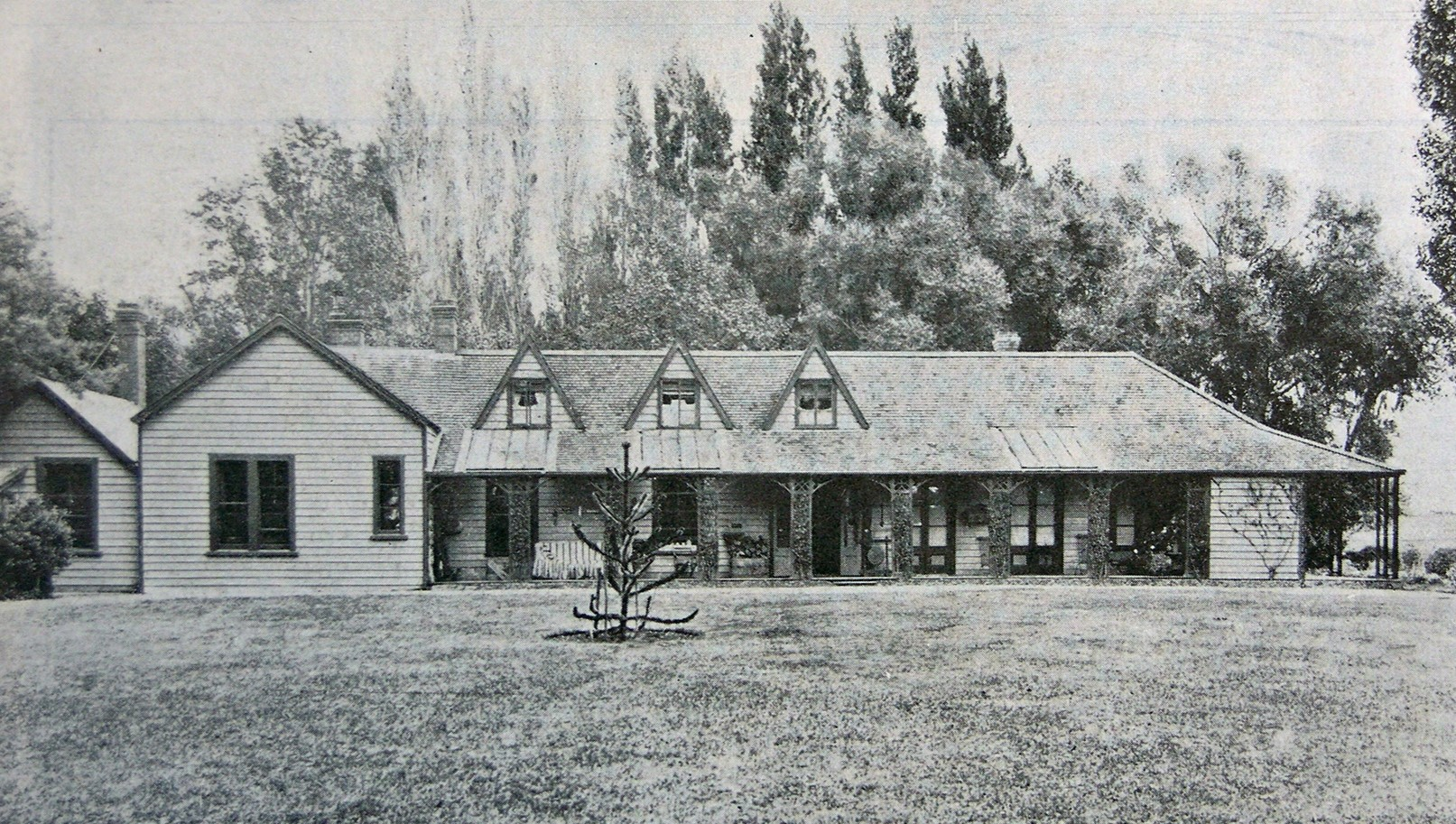
- The homestead in February 1907

General information
- Type: Homestead
- Architectural style: Victorian
- Location: 151 Milnes Road, Hororata, New Zealand
- Coordinates: 43.5437°S 171.9022°E
- Elevation: 216 metres
- Current tenants: Richard and Kate Foster (great-granddaughter of John Hall)
- Groundbreaking: Mid 1850s
- Completed: 1897
- Owner: Hall family

Technical details
- Material: Timber
- Floor count: Two

Website
- www.terracestation.org.nz

Heritage New Zealand – Category 1
- Designated: 23 June 1983
- Reference no.: 42

References
- "Terrace Station Homestead". New Zealand Heritage List/Rārangi Kōrero. Heritage New Zealand.

Terrace Station Homestead is a historic rural homestead located in Hororata, New Zealand. The property is recognised as a Category I Historic Place by Heritage New Zealand and is notable for its association with Sir John Hall, a 19th-century New Zealand politician and Premier. The homestead and surrounding station remain in the ownership of descendants of the Hall family and are managed by the Terrace Station Charitable Trust. The property was formerly known as Rakaia Terrace Station, reflecting its geographical extent.

== History ==
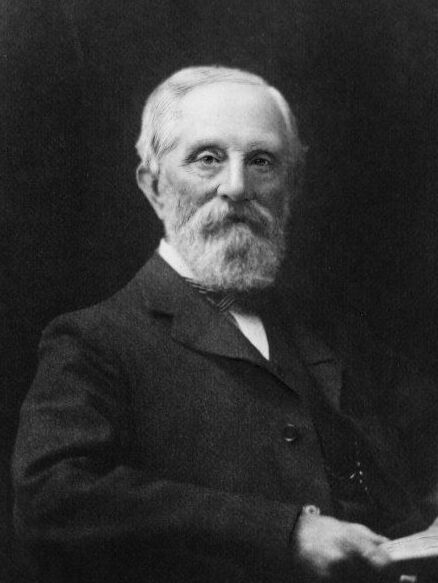
Sir John Hall, 1880

Terrace Station was established in the mid-19th century as part of a pastoral run in Canterbury. The property was acquired by Sir John Hall and his wife Rose, Lady Hall, in the 1850s. An initial three-room house was constructed in 1854 from prefabricated materials imported from Australia. This structure remains incorporated within the present homestead (what is now the drawing room and morning room).

The homestead was extended in several stages between 1863 and 1898 as the property developed and space was needed. A north-facing verandah was added in 1864. From 1866 to 1868, the dining room, two bedrooms, a study, and a kitchen were added. In the 1880s, a new homestead was planned, but plans for this were abandoned due to economic instability at the time. After his resignation from the premiership in 1882, Hall decided to place Terrace Station on the market and left with his family for England in 1883. Upon their return in 1886, the plan to sell the property appears to have been abandoned. In 1890, the two-storyed section (housing bedrooms) was built, followed by a new kitchen and study between 1896 and 1898.

An entrance hall was redesigned by Christchurch architect Samuel Hurst Seager. Seager used native timbers of kauri and rimu wood panels to line the walls of the entrance hall. Hall purchased two carved Māori panels in 1889 (carved in the early 1870s). These were placed here, with the rest of the entrance hall being decorated with Hall's collection from his international travels.

During this period, the station functioned as both a working pastoral farm and a site of political activity associated with Hall’s public career.

== Gardens and woodland ==
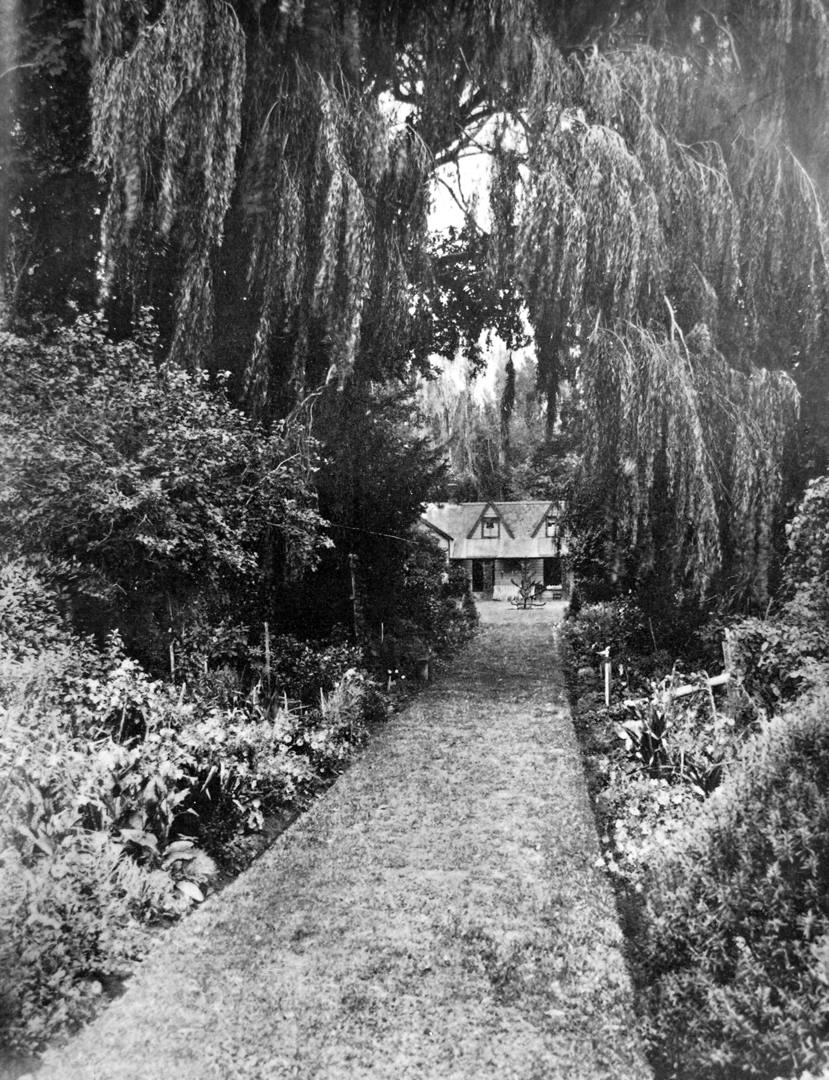
Gardens at Terrace Station Homestead, March 1907

The driveway to the homestead is planted in a design inspired by the English landscape designer Capability Brown, with specimen trees framing views toward Mount Hutt. It is planted with Wellingtonia on one side and Atlas cedar on the other. These were planted likely in 1887 (to commemorate Queen Victoria's Diamond Jubilee) and sometime in the 1940s, respectively. Four trees then define the 19th century eastern side of the garden: elm, sycamore, Portuguese laurel, and hornbeam, likely planted around 1863.

Woodland planting was undertaken to provide shelter for sheep, with 37 acres (14.97 hectares) planted out with oak, elm, ash and sycamore.

The 1850s gardens combine formal Victorian planning with a more relaxed country-garden style that evolved over the twentieth century. Originally, the garden was divided into a series of 'garden rooms' by laurel hedges. Although many of these hedges have disappeared, the underlying layout remains visible.

== Today ==
Terrace Station has remained in continuous occupation by the same family since the 19th century. In 2002, the Terrace Station Charitable Trust was established to support the preservation of the homestead and its associated collections. The Trust owns the homestead, while it continues to be occupied by the Foster family, descendants of Sir John and Lady Hall.
