= Crosbie Ward =

New Zealand politician and journalist (1832–1867)

The Honourable Crosbie Ward
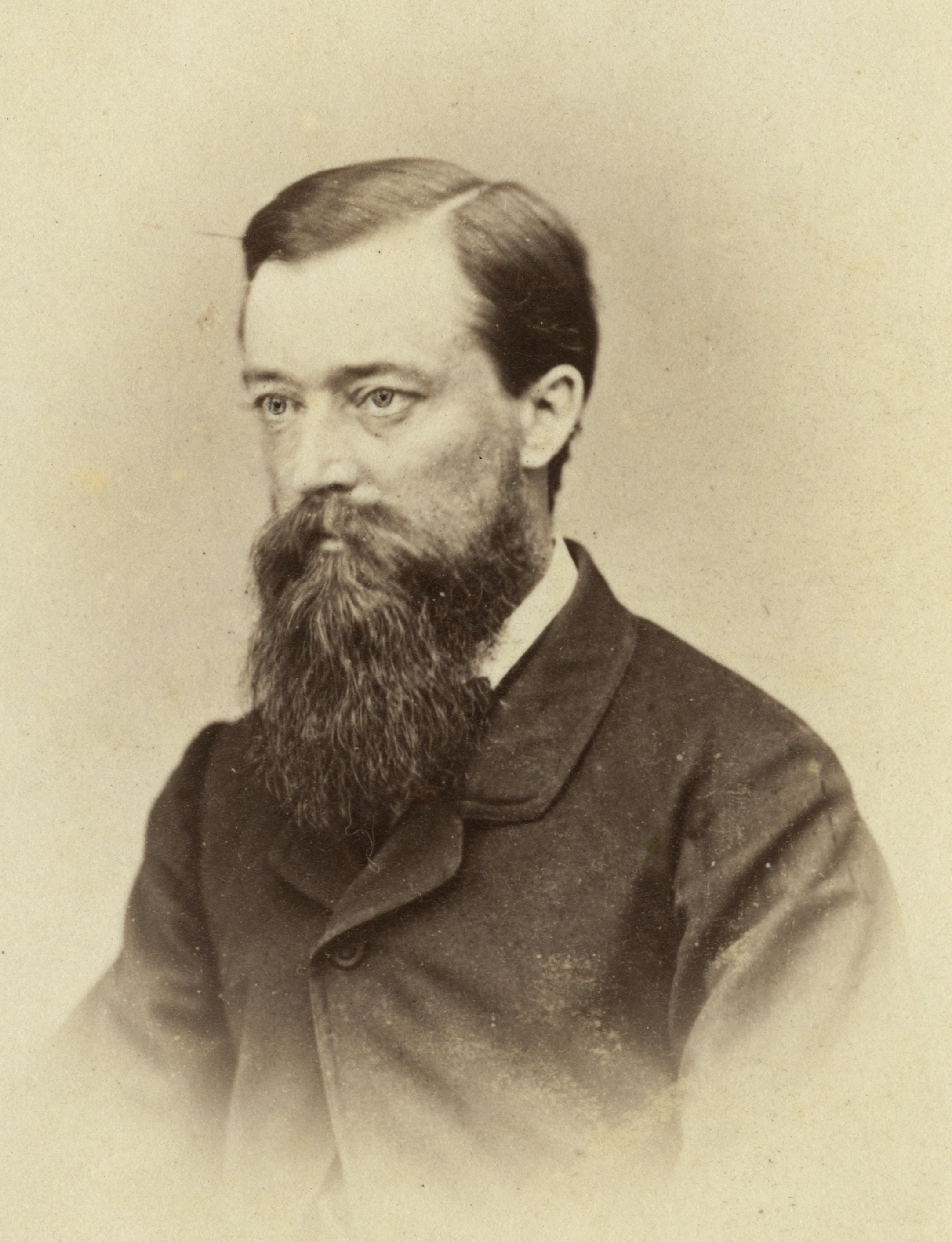
- Ward in April 1867

2nd Postmaster-General (New Zealand)
- In office 2 August 1861 – 6 August 1862
- Prime Minister: William Fox
- In office 21 August 1862 – 30 October 1863
- Prime Minister: Alfred Domett

Secretary for Crown Lands
- In office 2 August 1861 – 6 August 1862
- Prime Minister: William Fox

Member of the New Zealand Parliament for Town of Lyttelton
- In office 1858–1866

Member of the New Zealand Parliament for Town of Avon
- In office 1866–1867

Personal details
- Born: 10 February 1832 Killinchy, Ireland
- Died: 10 November 1867 (aged 35) London, England
- Spouse: Maggie Townsend (m. 1857)

Crosbie Ward (10 February 1832 – 10 November 1867) was a New Zealand politician who served as a member of the Canterbury Provincial Council (1855–1867) and as a member of parliament (1858–1867). His younger brother Hamilton and two elder brothers (who were Hamilton's caregivers) had gone to New Zealand and when the elder brothers drowned, Crosbie Ward came to New Zealand to support Hamilton. Together with Charles Bowen, Ward bought the Lyttelton Times in 1856 and he was soon regarded as "Canterbury's best satirical writer" with a "penetrating wit". He successfully negotiated a contract for postal transport by steamer with England, which improved the speed by which mail travelled between the two countries. He resigned from parliament in January 1867 when he was appointed agent for the Canterbury Provincial Council in London. He died later that year while in London at age 35.

== Early life ==
Ward was born in Killinchy, Ireland, on 10 February 1832, to Rev. Henry Ward. His paternal grandfather was Edward Ward (1753–1812), who was a member of the Irish House of Commons for 14 years. His grandfather's father-in-law was William Crosbie, 1st Earl of Glandore (1716–1781); from this part of the family came Crosbie Ward's given name. Ward received his education at King William's College in Castletown, Isle of Man, and at Trinity College Dublin.

Two elder (Edward and Henry) and one younger brother (Hamilton) were encouraged by their father to join the emigration to Canterbury in New Zealand. They travelled to Lyttelton on the Charlotte Jane, one of the First Four Ships to arrive in December 1850. They chose Ōtamahua / Quail Island in Lyttelton Harbour as their farm settlement, but the two elder brothers drowned in June 1851. Hamilton Ward, who had just turned 16, was taken in by Charlotte Godley, the wife of the founder of Canterbury, John Robert Godley. She wrote to the Ward family in Ireland, requesting that somebody come out to take care of Hamilton. Crosbie Ward was sent out; he arrived on the Stag on 17 May 1852.

== Professional career ==
The Ward brothers found Quail Island uneconomic to farm and bought land north of Rangiora instead. The two brothers bought part of the Racecourse Hill run near Darfield; this was managed by Hamilton Ward.

Ward and Charles Bowen bought the Lyttelton Times in 1856 for NZ£5,000, with most of the content produced by them from then on. Ward became a prominent journalist, showing deep talent for the task. His biographer, Geoffrey Rice, described him as having "a penetrating wit ... so free from malice that very few were seriously angry when jokes were made at their expense". The 1866 election for the superintendency of Canterbury Province was contested by William Sefton Moorhouse, James Dupré Lance, and William Travers. The Press had been founded in 1860 to oppose William Moorhouse, and its owner, vigorously backed Lance. The Lyttelton Times had always backed Moorhouse in his endeavour to build the Lyttelton Rail Tunnel. The rivalry of those newspapers "greatly enlivened" the election.

== Political career ==
New Zealand Parliament
| Years | Term | Electorate | Party |
|---|---|---|---|
| 1858–1860 | 2nd | Town of Lyttelton | Independent |
| 1861–1866 | 3rd | Town of Lyttelton | Independent |
| 1866–1867 | 4th | Avon | Independent |

Ward's political career started when he was elected to the Canterbury Provincial Council for the Akaroa electorate in March 1855. At the time, the number of Akaroa representatives was increased by two new seats due to population growth in the electorate, and Ward alongside William Sefton Moorhouse were returned unopposed. Ward represented Akaroa until the end of the first council in July 1857. Ward was prepared to stand again for Akaroa in the November 1857 election, but when unexpected opposition came up, he withdrew on nomination day (2 November). On the same day, the nomination meeting was held in the Lyttelton electorate, where Ward was also put forward as a candidate. With six candidates contesting four seats, the election was held the following day. Ward returned to Lyttelton at 2 pm on election day, when he was in last place—at the time, voters informed a polling officer orally of their chosen candidate and people kept a tally. After it became known that Ward had not been elected in Akaroa, voting for him picked up, but he ended up in fifth place when polling closed at 4 pm and was thus unsuccessful. Robert Waitt resigned from the provincial council's Lyttelton electorate and Ward was declared elected unopposed at the nomination meeting on 6 October 1858. With effect of 3 February 1860, he resigned from the provincial council as was required by law as he had an interest in a contract for the province. Nothing prevented him from getting re-elected, though, and Ward was returned unopposed on 20 October 1860. He remained on the provincial council until the end of the second council on 24 July 1861. In late August 1861, Ward was one of six candidates for four positions in the Lyttelton electorate of the Canterbury Provincial Council. The election was held just after Ward had joined the 1861–1862 Fox ministry on 2 August and he was at Parliament in Auckland at the time. Ward and Isaac Cookson, another incumbent who was also in Auckland as a member of the House of Representatives, both lost their provincial council seats in the election. The editor of The Press voiced surprise and regret about the Lyttelton election results:

There are, however, only three cases of failure among those who desired to be re-elected, (Note: This refers to all elections for the third Canterbury Provincial Council.) and of those only one is of any political significance—we refer to the case of Mr. Ward. And here, in passing, we cannot but express our regret that a gentleman of such eminence, and so distinguished by talent, should have been excluded from a position in which he could scarcely have failed to render some service to the Province. Indeed, the result of the Lyttelton election is altogether a puzzle. We know nothing of the three new candidates beyond that which their addresses communicate.

Ward stood in the 1855 general election for the Christchurch Country electorate. Two seats were available, and the election was contested by four candidates. John Ollivier and Ward were the unsuccessful candidates. When one of the successful candidates of that election—Dingley Brittin—resigned the following year, Ollivier and Ward contested the resulting 1856 Christchurch Country by-election. Ollivier defeated Ward by 191 votes to 120.

Ward represented the Town of Lyttelton electorate from the 1858 Town of Lyttelton by-election to 1866. Initially very shy in Parliament, he became known for taking on a great workload, which saw him rise in prominence. Due to his advocacy for postal transport via steamer, he became Postmaster-General and was in addition appointed Secretary for Crown Lands, in the 1861–1862 Fox ministry. In the 1862–1863 Domett ministry, he was Postmaster-General. He then represented the Avon electorate from 1866 to 28 January 1867, when he resigned. During 1863–1864, Ward was in England to negotiate a contract for postal services via the Panama Canal, which he concluded successfully. While there, he encountered misconceptions about New Zealand in regards to the cost of the New Zealand Wars and wrote an influential letter to Lord Lyttelton.

Following the resignation of Henry Selfe as agent for the Canterbury Provincial Council in late 1866, Ward had applied to be his successor and was appointed to the position through the provincial council's 1866 English Agent's Bill; this was the reason for resignation from Parliament. His main task in London was to sell provincial debentures.

== Family and death ==
On 13 January 1857, he married Margaret (Maggie) Townsend of Rangiora. Their only child was Harriett Louise Frances Ward. He died on 10 November 1867, aged 35, in London. On 18 September 1868, his widow married John George Cooke at Holy Trinity Church in New Plymouth.

== Notes ==
Political offices
| Preceded by Henry Tancred | Postmaster-General; 1861–1862; 1862–1863 | Succeeded by Walter Mantell |
| Preceded by Walter Mantell | Postmaster-General; 1861–1862; 1862–1863 | Succeeded by Thomas Gillies |
New Zealand Parliament
| Preceded by James FitzGerald | Member of Parliament for Lyttelton; 1858–1866 | Succeeded by Edward Hargreaves |
| Preceded by William Thomson | Member of Parliament for Avon; 1866–1867 | Succeeded by William Reeves |
