= 1911 Christchurch North by-election =

New Zealand by-election

- 17 August 1911
- Turnout: 6,921
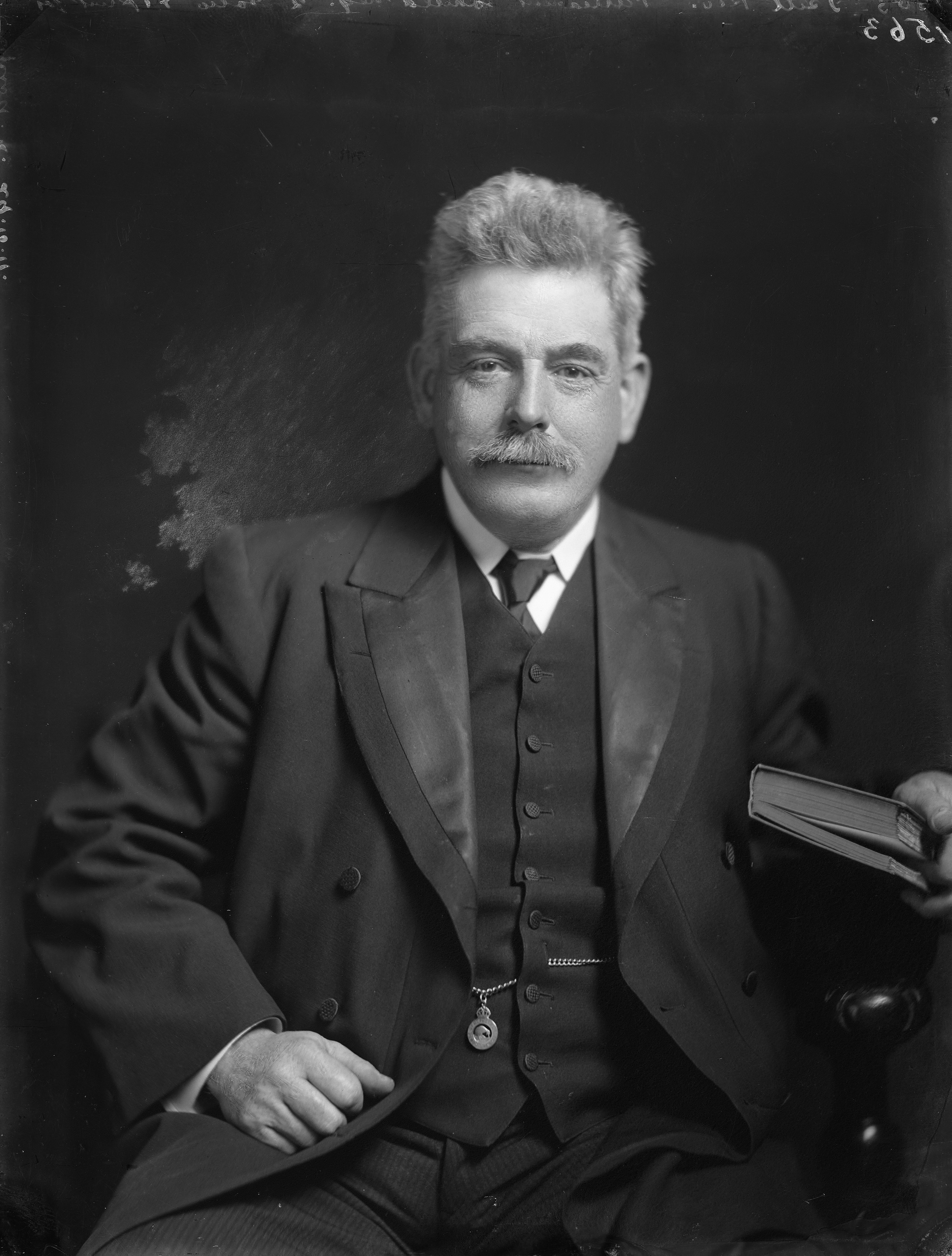

Candidate	Leonard Isitt	Dryden Hall
Party	Independent Liberal	Reform
Popular vote	3,815
Member before election
Tommy Taylor
Liberal–Labour
Elected Member
Leonard Isitt
Independent Liberal

The 1911 Christchurch North by-election was a by-election during the 17th New Zealand Parliament held on 17 August that year in the Christchurch North electorate. It was triggered by the death of sitting member Tommy Taylor on 27 July and was won by his close friend and political ally, Leonard Isitt.

== Background ==
Taylor had come to national prominence over prohibition even before he was first elected to parliament in the 1896 election. A radical politician, he was interested in a variety of labour and liberal issues, but was a staunch opponent of Richard Seddon and always maintained his independence, going as far as refusing company ownership or joining cabinet. On a personal level, he was deeply popular with the population, and when he died aged 49 only months after having been elected Mayor of Christchurch, 50,000 people lined the streets during his funeral procession.

== Candidates and campaign ==
At the time, Taylor had been one of New Zealand's most colourful politicians. Naturally, when it came to discussions around his succession in the Christchurch North electorate, a focus was on people who could advance some of the causes that had been important to Taylor. The two politicians mentioned in this context were Leonard Isitt and James McCombs. The next general election was not too far away and McCombs had already committed himself to contest Christchurch East, and he thus declined. He also stated that he was too busy during the by-election campaign period, as he had committed himself to organise the Taylor memorial fund, for which he was secretary.

Isitt accepted the nomination. Also a prohibitionist and a close friend of Taylor's, Isitt was at his bedside when he died. Labour interests did not stand a candidate against Isitt out of respect for Taylor. The conservative candidate was Dryden Hall, the second son of a former premier, John Hall.

== Results ==
The following table gives the election results:

1911 Christchurch North by-election
Party	Candidate	Votes	%	±%
Independent Liberal	Leonard Isitt	3,815	55.12	
Reform	Dryden Hall	3,106	44.88	
Majority		709	10.24	
Turnout		6,921		

Commentators attributed the win of successful candidate Leonard Isitt to floods of sympathy votes. Isitt held the Christchurch North electorate until he retired at the 1925 election. Hall contested the Christchurch North electorate in the 1911 general election a few months after the by-election, but was beaten by Isitt in the second ballot.
