= Alent =

Alent plc
- Company type: Public
- Founded: 2012
- Headquarters: Woking, Surrey
- Key people: Peter Hill, Chairman; Andrew Heath, CEO
- Products: Performance materials
- Revenue: £644.8 million (2014)
- Operating income: £95.1 million (2014)
- Net income: £46.8 million (2014)
- Number of employees: 2,600 (2014)
- Subsidiaries: Fernox

Alent plc is a supplier of surface treatment plating chemicals and electronics assembly materials. The company was listed on the London Stock Exchange and was a constituent of the FTSE 250 Index until it was acquired by Platform Specialty Products in November 2015.

== History ==
The company was established as a supplier of materials which facilitate electrical connectivity. It remained under the ownership of Alpha Inc until that group was acquired by Cookson Group in 1984. The business was demerged when Cookson Group split into two businesses (Alent and Vesuvius plc) in December 2012.

On 13 July 2015, it was announced that Platform Specialty Products would acquire Alent in a $2.1 billion deal. Following the acquisition the Enthone business (in addition to recently acquired businesses from OM Group, Inc.) will be merged with MacDermid to create a new market leader, while the Alpha division will remain as a standalone business for the foreseeable future. The transaction was completed in November 2015.

== Operations ==
The company makes materials for the electronics, automotive, industrial/construction markets and comprises two business segments.

- Enthone Inc. (Surface Chemistries) - a supplier of electro-plating chemistry to electronic, automotive and industrial end-markets.
- Alpha Inc. (Assembly Materials) - a supplier of interconnect materials, primarily into the electronics market.
