= 1856 Christchurch Country by-election =

New Zealand by-election

- 14 October 1856
- Turnout: 311
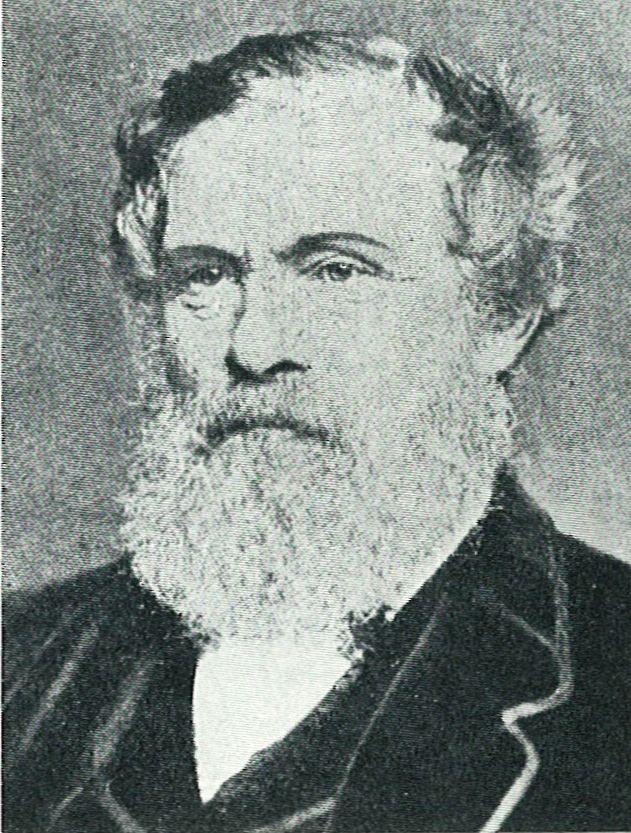

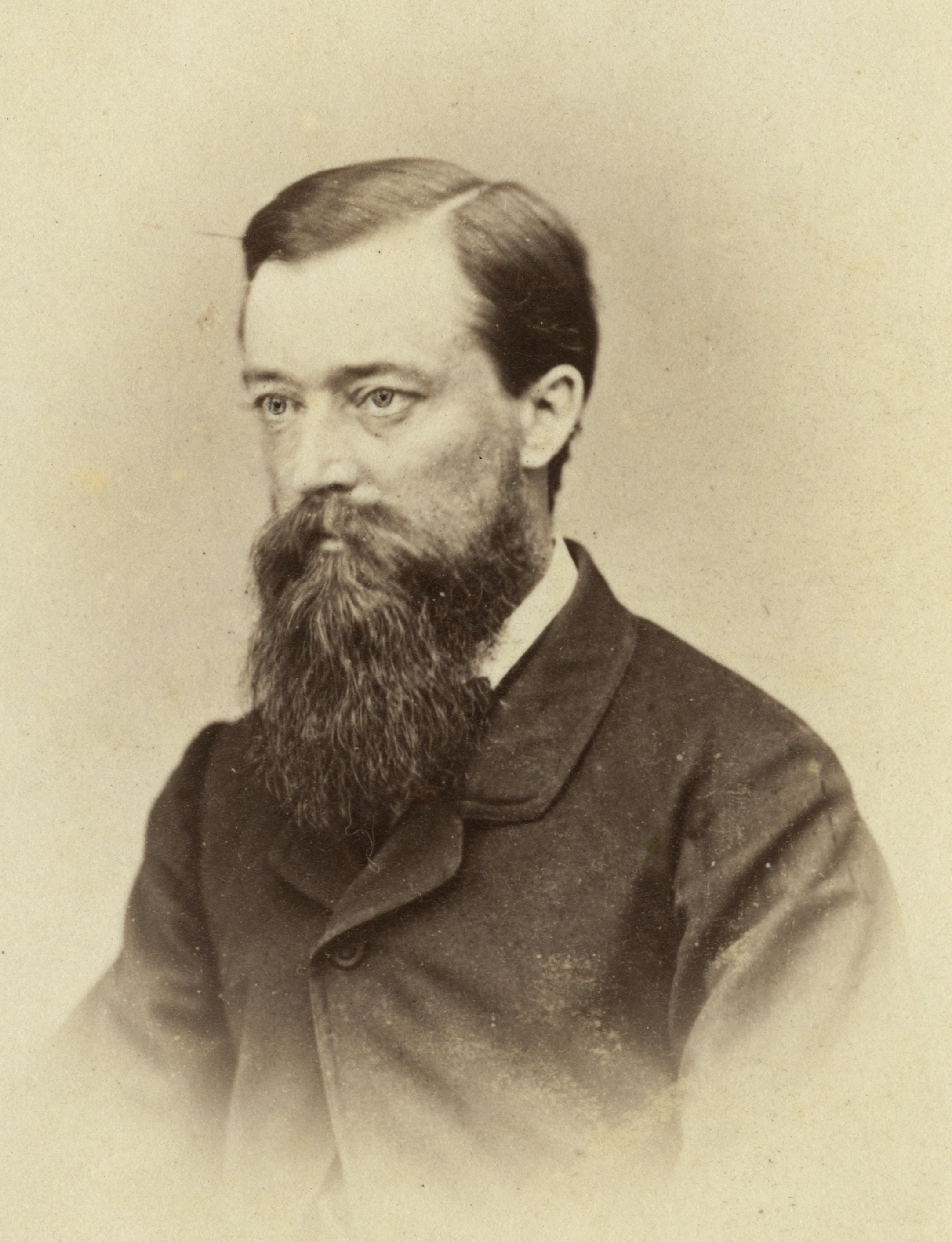
Candidate	John Ollivier	Crosbie Ward
Party	Independent	Independent
Popular vote	191	120
Percentage	61.4%	38.6%
MP before election
Dingley Brittin
Independent
Elected MP
John Ollivier
Independent

The Christchurch Country by-election 1856 was a by-election held in the multi-member Christchurch Country electorate during the 2nd New Zealand Parliament, on 14 October 1856, and was, along with the Grey and Bell 1856 by-election, the second equal contested by-election in New Zealand political history.

The by-election was caused by the resignation of incumbent MP Dingley Brittin on 7 July 1856.

The election was won by John Ollivier. On nomination day (13 October) Ollivier and Crosbie Ward were nominated, and after a show of hands in favour of Ollivier, Ward demanded a poll. Ollivier was subsequently elected the following day.

== Results ==
1856 Christchurch Country by-election
Party	Candidate	Votes	%	±%
Independent	John Ollivier	191	61.4	
Independent	Crosbie Ward	120	38.6	
Turnout		311		
Majority		71		
