= Christchurch North (electorate) =

Christchurch North is a former New Zealand parliamentary electorate. The electorate comprised the northern half of what is now considered the Christchurch Central City.

== Population centres ==
The previous electoral redistribution was undertaken in 1875 for the 1875–1876 election. In the six years since, New Zealand's European population had increased by 65%. In the 1881 electoral redistribution, the House of Representatives increased the number of European representatives to 91 (up from 84 since the 1875–76 election). The number of Māori electorates was held at four. The House further decided that electorates should not have more than one representative, which led to 35 new electorates being formed, including Christchurch North, and two electorates that had previously been abolished to be recreated. This necessitated a major disruption to existing boundaries.

The boundaries of the Christchurch North electorate were Bealey Avenue in the north (then called North Town Belt), Fitzgerald Avenue in the east (then called East Town Belt), Worcester Street in the south (through Latimer and Cathedral Squares), and Park Terrace in the west (then called Antigua Street). The electorate thus comprised the northern half of what is now considered the central city. The civic offices in Worcester Street were used as the polling station for the 1881 election, and Leslie Lee acted as the returning officer.

The 1981 census had shown that the North Island had experienced further population growth, and three additional general seats were created through the 1983 electoral redistribution, bringing the total number of electorates to 95. The South Island had, for the first time, experienced a population loss, but its number of general electorates was fixed at 25 since the 1967 electoral redistribution. More of the South Island population was moving to Christchurch, and two electorates were abolished, while two electorates were recreated (including Christchurch North). In the North Island, six electorates were newly created, three electorates were recreated, and six electorates were abolished.

== History ==
The electorate existed three times:

- 1881 to 1890;
- 1905 to 1946;
- 1984 to 1996, replacing the Papanui electorate, and then replaced by the Waimakiriri electorate for MMP.

It was held by three Premiers or Prime Ministers, Julius Vogel (1884 to 1889), Sidney Holland and Mike Moore.

Henry Thomson, a former Mayor of Christchurch, was the electorate's first representative in 1881. Thomson retired at the 1884 election and was succeeded by Julius Vogel, who beat John Crewes. Vogel returned to England in 1888, never to return to New Zealand, and his resignation became effective in early 1889. Edward Wingfield Humphreys won the resulting 1889 by-election and served until the end of the parliamentary term in the following year.

For the 1890 election election, a number of Christchurch electorates were amalgamated to form the three-member Christchurch electorate. Humphreys came fifth in that election and was thus unsuccessful.

=== Members of Parliament ===
The electorate was represented by nine members of parliament.

Key

Independent Liberal–Labour Independent Liberal

Liberal Reform National Labour

Election	Winner
1881 election	Henry Thomson
1884 election	Julius Vogel
1887 election	Julius Vogel
1889 by-election	Edward Wingfield Humphreys
(Electorate abolished 1890–1905, see Christchurch)
1905 election	Charles Gray
1908 election	Tommy Taylor
1911 by-election	Leonard Isitt
1911 election	Leonard Isitt
1914 election	Leonard Isitt
1919 election	Leonard Isitt
1922 election	Leonard Isitt
1925 election	Henry Holland
1928 election	Henry Holland
1931 election	Henry Holland
1935 election	Sidney Holland
1938 election	Sidney Holland
1943 election	Sidney Holland
(Electorate abolished 1946–1984, see Fendalton)
1984 election	Mike Moore
1987 election	Mike Moore
1990 election	Mike Moore
1993 election	Mike Moore
(Electorate abolished in 1996; see Waimakariri)

== Election results ==
=== 1993 election ===
1993 general election: Christchurch North
Party	Candidate	Votes	%	±%
Labour	Mike Moore	11,605	53.76	+2.97
National	Lee Morgan	5,581	25.85	
Alliance	Jan Davey	3,072	14.23	
NZ First	Chris Fulford	726	3.36	
Christian Heritage	Alex Mann	444	2.05	
McGillicuddy Serious	Cecil G. Murgatroyd	108	0.50	−0.18
Natural Law	Charles Drace	47	0.21	
Majority		6,024	27.91	+18.04
Turnout		21,583	86.17	−1.66
Registered electors		25,045		

=== 1990 election ===
1990 general election: Christchurch North
Party	Candidate	Votes	%	±%
Labour	Mike Moore	11,050	50.79	−8.96
National	Peter Yarrell	8,902	40.92	
NewLabour	John Strange	1,205	5.53	
Christian Heritage	Bill Smith	297	1.36	
McGillicuddy Serious	Cecil G. Murgatroyd	149	0.68	
Democrats	Mark Sadler	148	0.68	−1.72
Majority		2,148	9.87	−12.73
Turnout		21,753	87.83	−0.54
Registered electors		24,767		

=== 1987 election ===
1987 general election: Christchurch North
Party	Candidate	Votes	%	±%
Labour	Mike Moore	12,420	59.75	+3.20
National	Brendan McNeill	7,722	37.15	
Democrats	Mark Sadler	499	2.40	
Wizard Party	John Appleby	145	0.69	
Majority		4,698	22.60	−3.62
Turnout		20,786	88.37	−4.90
Registered electors		23,520		

=== 1984 election ===
1984 general election: Christchurch North
Party	Candidate	Votes	%	±%
Labour	Mike Moore	12,350	56.55	
National	David Dumergue	6,662	30.50	
NZ Party	Stephen Nicholson	2,047	9.37	
Social Credit	Thomas Langridge	679	3.10	
Values	Roger McArthur	101	0.46	
Majority		5,728	26.22	
Turnout		21,839	93.27	
Registered electors		23,413		

=== 1943 election ===
1943 general election: Christchurch North (Note: Registered electors refers to civilian voters only; nationwide, 93,295 servicemen also cast valid votes although their names did not appear on electoral rolls.)
Party	Candidate	Votes	%	±%
National	Sidney Holland	8,542	55.23	
Labour	George Manning	5,897	38.13	
Democratic Labour	John Thomas Lauder Hart Parry	508	3.28	
Independent	Lancelot Charles Walker	459	2.97	
Independent	Maud Trisillian Fere	61	0.39	
Majority		2,645	17.10	
Informal votes		189	1.21	
Turnout		15,656	89.97	
Registered electors		17,402		

Table footnotes:

=== 1931 election ===
1931 general election: Christchurch North
Party	Candidate	Votes	%	±%
Reform	Henry Holland	5,527	45.11	
Labour	Elizabeth McCombs	3,450	28.16	
Independent	Lancelot Charles Walker	3,275	26.73	
Majority		2,077	16.95	
Informal votes		53	0.43	
Turnout		12,305	84.75	
Registered electors		14,520		

=== 1928 election ===
1928 general election: Christchurch North
Party	Candidate	Votes	%	±%
Reform	Henry Holland	5,493	43.37	
United	Ernest Andrews	3,601	28.43	
Labour	John Archer	3,572	28.20	
Majority		1,892	14.94	
Informal votes		125	0.98	
Turnout		12,791	88.10	
Registered electors		14,518		

=== 1914 election ===
1914 general election: Christchurch North
Party	Candidate	Votes	%	±%
Liberal	Leonard Isitt	5,222	56.59	+1.47
Reform	Henry Toogood	4,005	43.41	
Majority		1,217	13.19	+2.95
Informal votes		101	1.08	
Turnout		9,328	86.80	
Registered electors		10,746		

=== 1911 by-election ===
1911 Christchurch North by-election
Party	Candidate	Votes	%	±%
Independent Liberal	Leonard Isitt	3,815	55.12	
Reform	Dryden Hall	3,106	44.88	
Majority		709	10.24	
Turnout		6,921		

=== 1889 by-election ===
1889 Christchurch North by-election
Party	Candidate	Votes	%	±%
Independent	Edward Humphreys	403	41.76	
Independent	John Ollivier	378	39.17	
Independent	Eden George	184	19.07	
Majority		25	2.59	
Turnout		965		

=== 1884 election ===
1884 general election: Christchurch North
Party	Candidate	Votes	%	±%
Independent	Julius Vogel	930	80.66	
Independent	John Crewes	223	19.34	
Majority		707	61.32	
Turnout		1,153	51.15	
Registered electors		2,254		
