= Charles Hunter Brown =

New Zealand politician

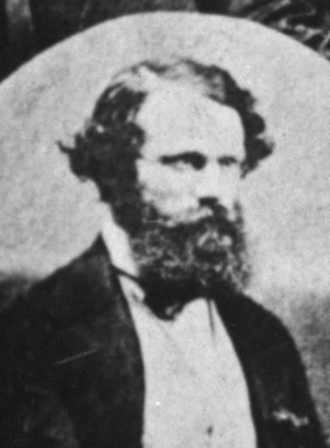
Brown in 1860

New Zealand Parliament
Years	Term	Electorate	Party
1860	2nd	Christchurch Country	Independent

Charles Hunter Brown (1825–1898) was a New Zealand politician from Canterbury, New Zealand.

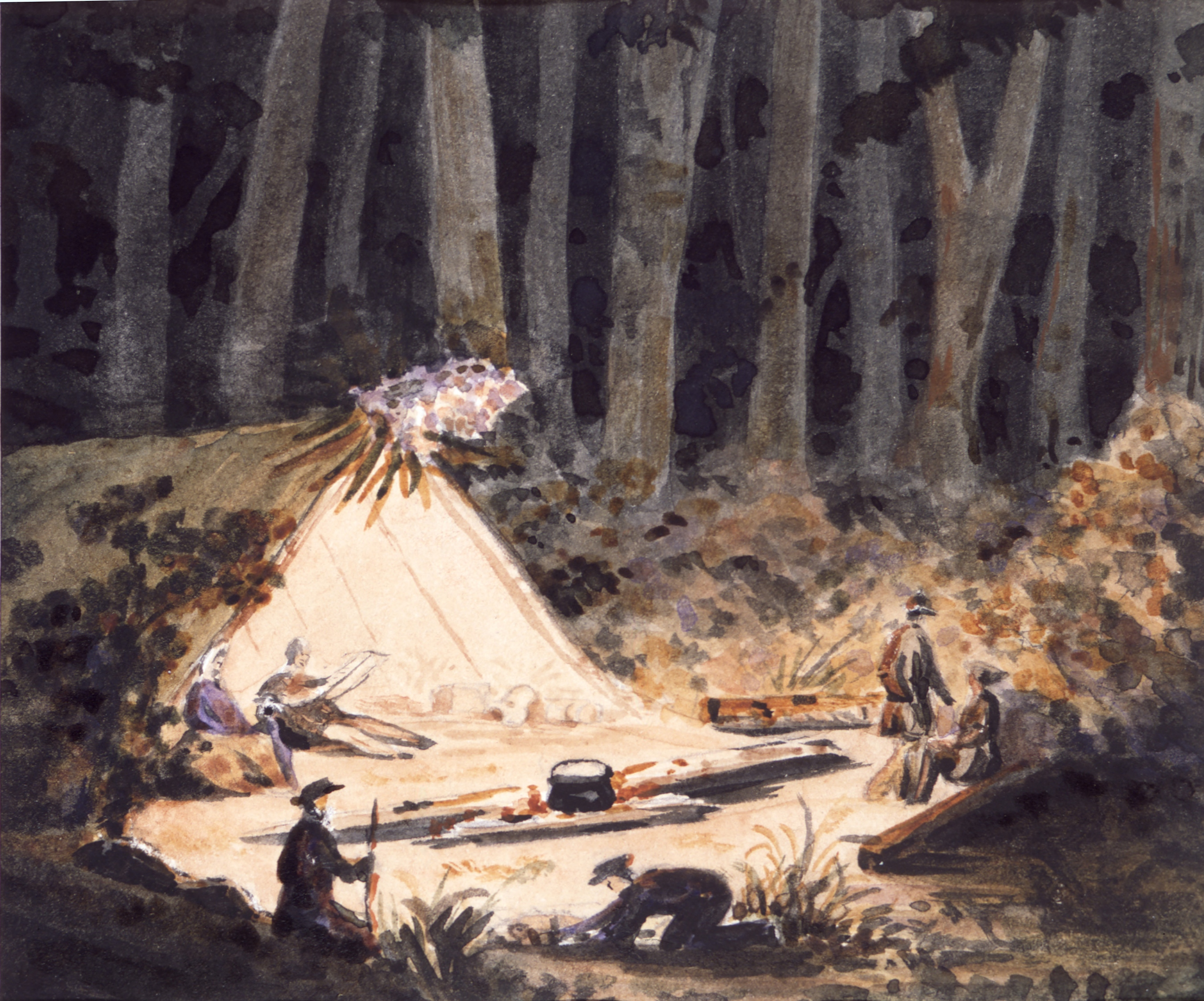
Night-time camping scene at Rangiora bush with John Robert Godley, Charlotte Godley, Arthur Godley, Charles Torlesse, Charles Hunter Brown, and Jerningham Wakefield. Painted on 6 December 1850 by Frederick Weld.

He represented Christchurch Country in the 2nd Parliament in 1860 from 21 April to 5 November, but was defeated when he then stood for the Cheviot electorate in North Canterbury in the 1861 election.

New Zealand Parliament
Preceded by John Hall	Member of Parliament for Christchurch Country; 1860; Served alongside: Isaac Cookson	Constituency abolished
