= Robert Malpas =

British engineer and businessman (1927–2023)

Sir Robert Malpas
- Born: August 9, 1927; Wallington, Surrey, England
- Died: June 18, 2023 (aged 95); London, England
- Occupations: Engineer, businessman
- Known for: Chairman of ICI and being pushed onto a train track
- Spouse: Josephine Dickenson (m. 1956; died 2004) Joan Holloway (m. 2005)
- Children: 2

Sir Robert Malpas CBE FREng FRSA FIMechE (9 August 1927 – 18 June 2023) was a British engineer and businessman. Much of his career was spent with ICI. He was chairman of ICI Europa Ltd and a ICI main board director before becoming a managing director of BP, chairman of PowerGen and the Cookson Group, and co-chairman of Eurotunnel.

In April 2018, Malpas was pushed onto the tracks at Marble Arch station where he suffered serious injuries. His attacker was sentenced to life in prison in June 2019.

== Early life ==
The son of Cheshyre Malpas and his wife Louise Marie Marcelle Malpas, he was educated at Taunton School and St George's College, Quilmes, Argentina, and then at the University of Durham, where he earned a bachelor's degree in mechanical engineering.

== Career ==
In 1948, Malpas joined Imperial Chemical Industries, remaining with the company until 1963. He then transferred to Alcudia SA, a Spanish company then almost half-owned by ICI, and in 1965 to ICI Europa Ltd, based in Brussels. He became chairman of ICI Europa Ltd in 1973 and from 1975 to 1978 was a member of the ICI main board. From 1978 to 1982, he was president of Halcon International Inc., from 1983 to 1989, a managing director of BP, from 1990, chairman of PowerGen, from 1991 to 1998, chairman of the Cookson Group, simultaneously serving as co-chairman of Eurotunnel from 1996 to 1998. From 1998 to 2002, he was chairman of Ferghana Partners Ltd. He was also a director of Repsol SA (1989–2002), the BOC Group (1981–1996), Eurotunnel (1987–1999), Enagas, Spain (2002–2006) and Agcert PLC (2005–2008).

In retirement, he was chairman of the board of RL Automotive.

His book Energy for Planet Earth (1991), based on a series of articles which appeared in a special issue of Scientific American in 1990, considers the factors governing the way people use energy, dividing them into economic and social forces.

== Voluntary work and private life ==
In 1956, Malpas married Josephine Dickenson. After her death in 2004, he married secondly in 2005, Josephine's nurse, Joan Holloway.

Malpas was a member of the Engineering Council from 1983 to 1988 and was its vice-chairman from 1984 to 1988, a member of the Advisory Council for Applied Research and Development, 1983–1986, chairman of the LINK Steering Group, 1987–1993 and of the Natural Environment Research Council, 1993–1996. In Who's Who, he states his recreations as "Sport, music, theatre, golf". Malpas was elected a member of the National Academy of Engineering in 1985 for substantial contributions to the industrial engineering community and to its relations with academe in England, Europe and the United States.

On 27 April 2018, Malpas was suddenly and without warning pushed onto the train tracks at Marble Arch tube station suffering a broken pelvis and a head wound. A bystander rescued him from the tracks and the perpetrator who was unknown to Malpas, was later found guilty of attempted murder and jailed for life. The incident was captured on CCTV.

In June 2021, Malpas was featured on an episode of 24 Hours in A&E, being treated at St George's Hospital, London, in Autumn 2020 after suffering from a low heart rate, dizziness and confusion, from which he recovered.

Malpas died on 18 June 2023, at the age of 95.

== Publications ==
- Energy for Planet Earth (1991)

== Honours ==
- Order of Civil Merit, Spain, 1967
- Fellow of the Royal Academy of Engineering
- Appointed Commander of the Order of the British Empire (CBE), 1975 Birthday Honours, "for services to British commercial interests in Belgium."
- Hon. Doctorate, University of Loughborough, 1983
- Hon. Doctorate, University of Surrey, 1984
- Member, National Academy of Engineering, 1985
- Hon. Fellow of the Royal Society of Chemistry, 1988
- Hon. Doctorate, University of Newcastle, 1991
- Hon. DSc, University of Bath, 1991
- Hon. Fellow, University of Westminster, 1992
- Hon. Doctorate, University of Durham, 1997
- Appointed Knight Bachelor, 1998 Birthday Honours, "for services to Industry and to Science and Technology."
- Hon. FIMechE, 1999
- Hon. Doctorate, Sheffield Hallam University, 2001
