= 1858 Town of Lyttelton by-election =

New Zealand by-election

The Town of Lyttelton by-election 1856 was a by-election held in the Town of Lyttelton electorate during the 2nd New Zealand Parliament, on 28 May 1856.

The by-election was caused by the resignation of incumbent MP James FitzGerald and was won unopposed by Crosbie Ward.
