= Vesuvius plc =

British ceramics company

- Type: Public
- Traded as: LSE: VSVS; FTSE 250 component
- Industry: Materials technology
- Founded: 1704
- Headquarters: London, UK
- Key people: Carl-Peter Forster, Chairman; Patrick André, CEO
- Revenue: ▼£1,809.5 million (2025)
- Operating income: ▼£151.1 million (2025)
- Net income: ▼£64.8 million (2025)
- Website: www.vesuvius.com

Vesuvius plc is a British engineered ceramics company headquartered in London whose products are used by steelmakers and foundries as well as in the glass and solar energy industries. The company is listed on the London Stock Exchange and is a constituent of the FTSE 250 Index.

== History ==
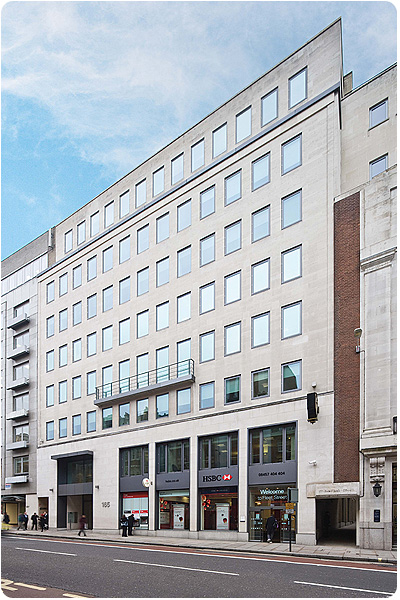
The Vesuvius head office in Fleet Street, City of London

The company was founded by Isaac Cookson in 1704 as a collection of metal and glass businesses on Tyneside. In 1851, the company diversified into lead manufacturing. In 1924, it merged with Lock Lancaster and W.W. & R. Johnson & Sons to form Associated Lead Manufacturers. During 1930, the firm was first listed on the London Stock Exchange. In 1966, Associated Lead Manufacturers was renamed Lead Industries Group. In 1977, it re-acquired the one-time largest antimony smelter in the world, based in Laredo, Texas. Two years later, the company acquired the A.J. Oster Company, a non-ferrous metal producer.

During 1982, Lead Industries Group was rebranded to Cookson Group to reflect the name of the company's founder; five years later, the firm bought the Vesuvius Crucible Company, a ceramics supplier. Between 1991 and 1998, Sir Robert Malpas was chairman of the company. In 1994, Cookson Group sold part of its engineering product operations for £84.5 million via a management buyout. During the mid-1990s, following regulatory approval, it opted to merge its consumable refractory products with those of the German firm Thyssen AG to create two new European-based joint ventures.

In December 1999, Cookson Group made its biggest acquisition so far in its purchase of the specialty chemicals manufacturer Enthone-OMI in exchange for £310 million in cash; the transaction strengthened the company's product line for the manufacturers of printed circuit boards. That same year, the company acquired the Premier Refractories division of Alpine Group for £252 million. Furthermore, around this period, the company was conducting a series of divestments and reducing its debt levels while reorienting towards three core markets: electronics ceramics and precious metals.

The early 2000s was a time of financial hardship for the firm, in part due to falling demand but also but also as a result of its debt burden; after it recording a loss of £44.5 million, the dividend was suspended and a heavily discounted rights issue of £277.5 million was enacted in mid 2002. Some reports speculated that the company was facing collapse during this time.

In 2005, Cookson Group announced that it would be focusing on high technology products and emerging markets. Two years later, Cookson Electronics announced the relocation of its Indian R&D efforts to a new research center based in Bangalore. In early 2008, it acquire Foseco, a supplier to the foundry and steel industries, in exchange for $1 billion following the settlement of anti-trust concerns. One year later, amid the Great Recession, the company implemented job cuts that totaled seven percent of its global workforce.

In December 2012, Cookson Group changed its name to Vesuvius, the former performance materials division was demerged to form a new company called Alent and the name Cookson ceased to be used. In August 2015, it acquired the Italian specialist firm Sidermes Group. In 2018, while amid a restructuring programme aimed at saving £22 million per year, the firm reported record profits of £99.6 million over a six month period.

In March 2022, in response to the Russian invasion of Ukraine, Vesuvius opted to cease all deliveries to Russian customers for the duration of the conflict. In February 2023, the firm was the victim of a cyberattack that compelled the shut down of multiple affected systems. In response to an international economic downturn during the early 2020s, it opted to invest in its existing facilities as well as several research and development programmes.

== Operations ==
The company's operations are formed into four activities: Steel Flow Control, Foundry Technologies, Advanced Refractories and Precious Metals Processing.
