= Jerningham Wakefield =

New Zealand politician (1820–1879)

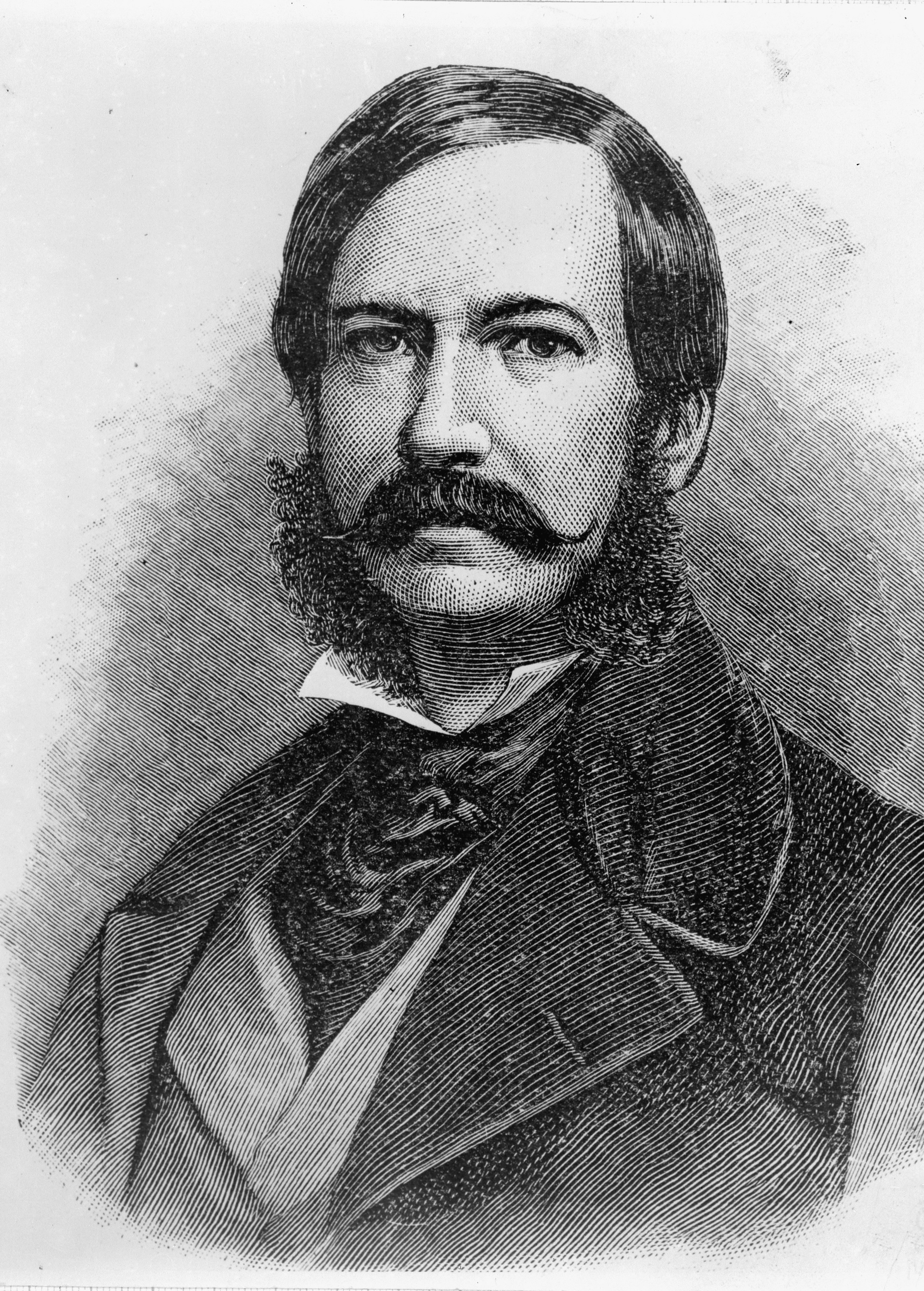
- Portrait of Jerningham Wakefield from ca 1850

Member of the New Zealand Parliament for Christchurch Country
- In office 27 August 1853 – 15 September 1855
- Preceded by: New constituency
- Succeeded by: Dingley Askham Brittin; John Hall

Member of the New Zealand Parliament for Christchurch City East
- In office 18 January 1871 – 6 December 1875
- Preceded by: New constituency
- Succeeded by: In abeyance

Personal details
- Born: 25 June 1820 London, England
- Died: 3 March 1879 (aged 58) Ashburton, New Zealand
- Relations: Edward Gibbon Wakefield (father); Edward Wakefield (grandfather); Daniel Bell Wakefield (uncle); William Wakefield (uncle); Arthur Wakefield (uncle); Felix Wakefield (uncle); Charles Torlesse (cousin)

Edward Jerningham Wakefield (25 June 1820 – 3 March 1879), known as Jerningham Wakefield, was the only son of Edward Gibbon Wakefield. As such, he was closely associated with his father's interest in colonisation. He worked for the New Zealand Company and later was a member of the Canterbury Association. He was active as a politician in New Zealand, both at national and provincial level, but became an alcoholic and died penniless in an old people's home.

== Early life ==
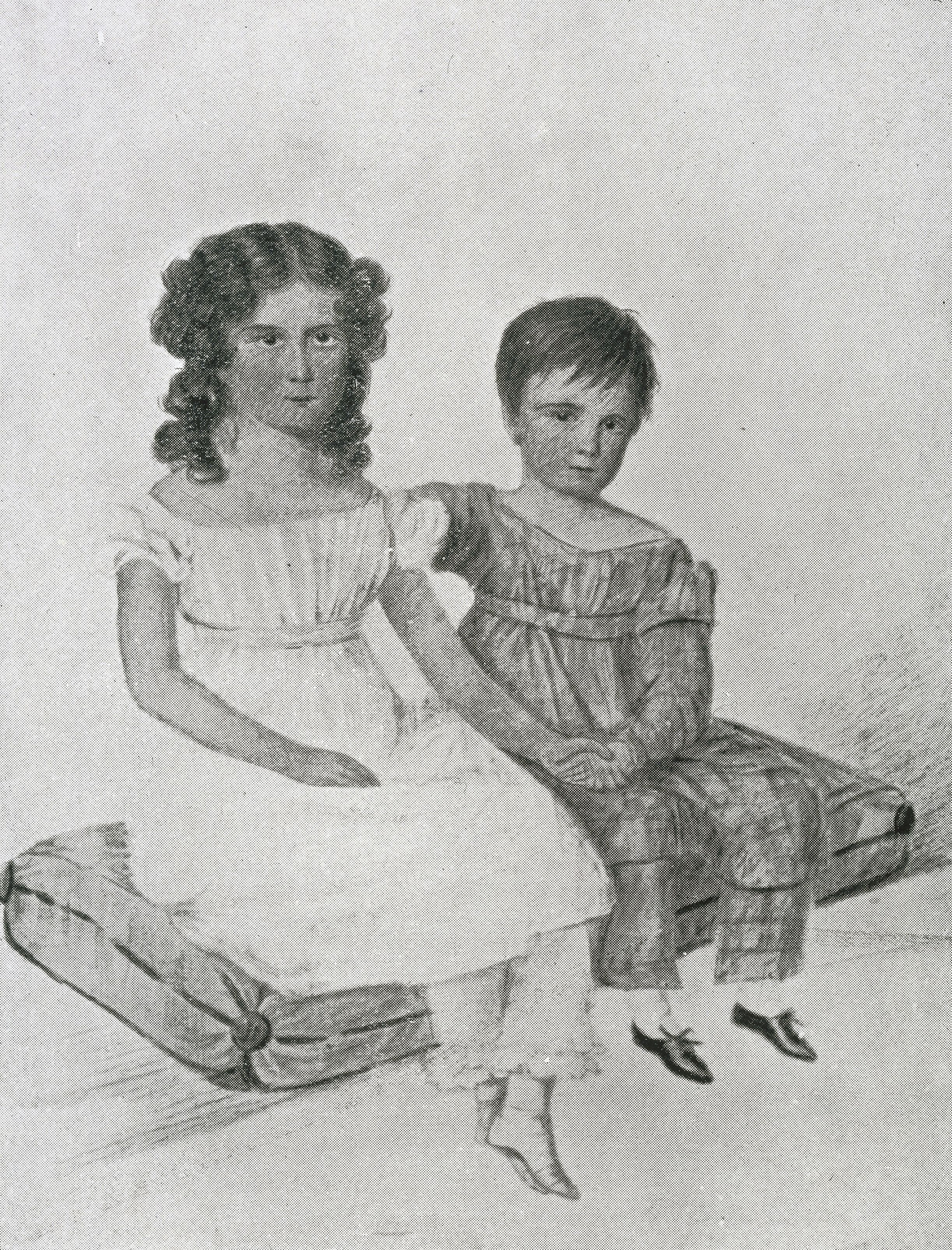
Nina and Jerningham Wakefield in 1822

Wakefield was born in London in 1820. His parents were Edward Gibbon Wakefield and Eliza Anne Frances Pattle, but his mother died within days of his birth. Together with his sister Nina, he was mostly brought up by Catherine Torlesse, his father's sister and mother of Charles Torlesse. Wakefield was known by his middle name and educated at Bruce Castle School and King's College London.

== Later life ==
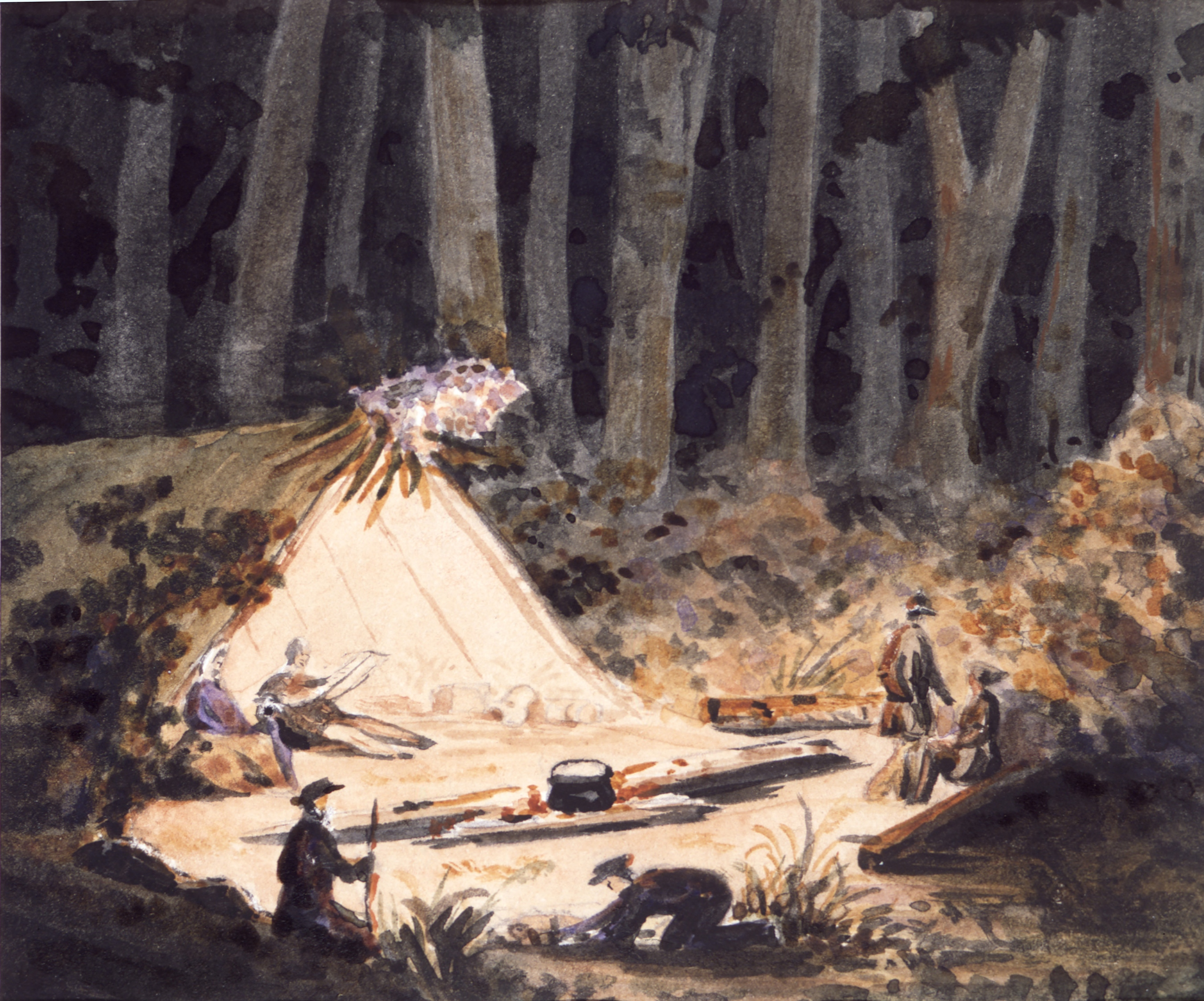
Night-time camping scene at Rangiora bush with John Robert Godley, Charlotte Godley, Arthur Godley, Charles Torlesse, Charles Hunter Brown, and Jerningham Wakefield. Painted on 6 December 1850 by Frederick Weld.

In 1839 he accompanied Colonel William Wakefield, his uncle, to New Zealand on the New Zealand Company ship Tory. This expedition was an advance party seeking a suitable site to found a colony in the Cook Strait area. In 1840 he explored the coast from Wellington to Whanganui River, guided by a group of Maori he referred to as his "slaves".

Jerningham Wakefield had intended to stay in New Zealand for only a few months, but he found the growth of the new colony so fascinating that it was four years before he returned to England in 1844. He quickly assembled his journals and they were published as Adventure in New Zealand in April 1845. The favourable picture he presented of the colony founded by the New Zealand Company helped the company to avoid censure in the House of Commons.

For the next five years he lived a dissipated life in London. In September 1845 he attended a lecture there at the Royal Adelaide Gallery by Barnet Burns, a tattooed Pākehā Māori who had previously applied unsuccessfully to join the New Zealand Company on the Tory. He joined the Canterbury Association on 6 May 1848, but resigned on 8 November 1849. Then, in 1850, faced with bankruptcy, Wakefield sailed for New Zealand, this time with the advance party for the Canterbury settlement.

New Zealand Parliament
Years	Term	Electorate	Party
1853–1855	1st	Christchurch Country	Independent
1871–1875	5th	Christchurch City East	Independent

He entered politics, in New Zealand's 1st Parliament, as one of the two members for Christchurch Country for 1853–1855. He moved to Wellington in 1855 to be near his sick father, and represented the City of Wellington in the Provincial Council from 1857 to 1861. He was a member of the 5th Parliament for Christchurch City East for 1871–1875. He stood in the 1875 election in the Christchurch electorate, where six candidates were contesting three available positions, but came fifth and was thus defeated.

He had a financial interest in the earliest daily newspapers.

Because of his increasing alcoholism, his behaviour was very erratic and he was an embarrassment to his supporters. He was one of the MPs sometimes locked in small rooms at Parliament by whips to keep them sober enough to vote in critical divisions, though in 1872 this was defeated when political opponents lowered a bottle of whisky down the chimney to him. Gradually over the next few years he dissipated his wealth and substance and destroyed his health. He died, penniless, in Ashburton, New Zealand, in 1879.

== Works ==
- The British Colonization of New Zealand (1837)
- Adventure in New Zealand; from 1839-1844 (1845) 2 vols.
- The Hand-book for New Zealand (1848)
- The Founders of Canterbury; being Letters from the late Edward Gibbon Wakefield to the late John Robert Godley etc. (1868) editor
- The Lost Journal of Edward Jerningham Wakefield; being an Account of his Exploits and Adventures in New Zealand in the Years 1850-1858 (c. 1909) posthumously published
- The London Journal of Edward Jerningham Wakefield 1845-46 (1972) posthumously published; edited by Joan Stevens

New Zealand Parliament
New constituency	Member of Parliament for Christchurch Country; 1853–1855; Served alongside: James Stuart-Wortley	Succeeded by Dingley Askham Brittin; John Hall
New constituency	Member of Parliament for Christchurch City East; 1871–1875	In abeyance Title next held by Thomas Davey
