= 1862–1863 Domett ministry =

Former government of New Zealand

The Domett ministry was a responsible government which held power in New Zealand from August 1862 to October 1863. Although Alfred Domett was the head of the government, he was never appointed Premier as that office had yet to be established. Instead, he was Colonial Secretary and Secretary for Crown Lands.

== Background ==
Domett's ministry has been described as a group of Governor Grey's "more pliant old friends", with Grey even engaging in Cabinet-making by visiting Dillon Bell to recruit him as Native Minister. Grey’s own policy towards Māori was largely adopted by the ministry: troops invaded the Waikato intending to confiscate large tracts of land from the Māori iwi, which would then be sold on to military settlers recruited from Britain. To open up the market in Māori land to private investors, the Domett ministry also began to permit direct land sales without Crown pre-emption.

The Domett ministry was largely provincialist in character, relaxing previous restrictions on borrowing by the provincial councils. Domett also introduced a bill giving provinces the right to legislate on Crown lands within their boundaries, which he admitted was unconstitutional.

The House of Representatives was split between four main factions which voted together in various combinations, with Domett variously depending on Edward Stafford, William Fox and William Fitzherbert to pass legislation. Even the ministry itself was said to have been only kept together by Domett’s "nonchalance and spice of humor". On one occasion, Stafford carried a vote to make the position of Attorney-General a non-political post outside of Cabinet, forcing Henry Sewell to resign in favour of the less politically outspoken Frederick Whitaker. In 1863, the ministry collapsed when Bell recommended that the Waitara Block of land be returned to the owners who had possessed it before the First Taranaki War, which caused the more hawkish Thomas Russell to threaten to dissent. This precipitated Domett’s own resignation; thereafter he was replaced as Premier by Whitaker.

== Ministers ==
The following members served in the Domett ministry:

Name	Portrait	Office	Term
Alfred Domett		Colonial Secretary	6 August 1862 – 30 October 1863
Alfred Domett		Secretary for Crown Lands	22 August 1862 – 30 October 1863
Thomas Gillies		Attorney-General	6 August 1862 – 23 August 1862
Dillon Bell		Colonial Treasurer	6 August 1862 – 21 August 1862
Dillon Bell		Commissioner of Customs	6 August 1862 – 21 August 1862
Dillon Bell		Minister for Native Affairs	6 August 1862 – 30 October 1863
Walter Mantell		Member of the Executive Council	6 August 1862 – 25 November 1863
Walter Mantell		Postmaster-General	6 August 1862 – 21 August 1862
Walter Mantell		Secretary for Crown Lands	6 August 1862 – 21 August 1862
Henry Tancred, MLC		Member of Executive Council	6 August 1862 – 6 February 1863
Thomas Russell		Member of Executive Council	6 August 1862 – 30 October 1863
Thomas Russell		Minister of Colonial Defence	22 July 1863 – 24 November 1864
Reader Wood		Colonial Treasurer	21 August 1862 – 24 November 1864
Reader Wood		Commissioner of Customs	21 August 1862 – 24 November 1864
Crosbie Ward		Postmaster-General	21 August 1862 – 30 October 1863
Henry Sewell, MLC		Attorney-General	23 August 1862 – 1 January 1863

== See also ==
- New Zealand Government
