= Dingley Brittin =

New Zealand politician (1823–1881)

New Zealand Parliament
Years	Term	Electorate	Party
1855–1856	2nd	Christchurch Country	Independent

Dingley Askham Brittin (1823–1881) was an English solicitor. He spent three years in New Zealand as a runholder and during that time, he represented the Christchurch Country electorate in the New Zealand House of Representatives for one term.

Brittin was born in Huntingdonshire, England, in 1823. He received an education as a solicitor, but during his time in New Zealand, he did not practice in that profession. Brittin came out to New Zealand on the Minerva in 1853, together with his wife, and his brother John Danns Brittin, his wife and son. The Minerva, one of the ships chartered by the Canterbury Association, had left London on 29 September and Plymouth on 12 October 1852, and arrived in Lyttelton on 2 February 1853. Other notable passengers on the ship were Henry Sewell, Edward Gibbon Wakefield, Jane and John Deans, Thomas Rowley, John Cuff, and Elizabeth Torlesse.

The Brittin brothers took up run 105 at the mouth of the Rakaia River. They sold their land in 1854, and took land in the Port Hills.

In the 1855 election, Brittin was one of four candidates in the two-member Christchurch Country electorate. He came second and represented the electorate in the 2nd New Zealand Parliament in 1856, but resigned during the 1856 session before the end of his term; the Speaker read out his letter of resignation on 31 July, two weeks before the session finished. He had to return to England on 'urgent business' in 1856 and feared that he may not be back in time for the start of the 1857 parliamentary session. In fact, he did not return to New Zealand, and historian George Macdonald noted that he "was not heard of again" in Canterbury. The resulting by-election was won by John Ollivier, who beat Crosbie Ward.

Brittin died in 1881 and is buried at All Saints, the Parish Church of St Ives. His wife Anna Maria Brittin, who died in 1902, is buried next to him.

New Zealand Parliament
Preceded by Jerningham Wakefield; James Stuart-Wortley	Member of Parliament for Christchurch Country; 1855–1856; Served alongside: John Hall	Succeeded by John Ollivier
