= Frances Caverhill =

NZ diarist and homemaker (1834–1897

- Born: Hannah Rebecca Frances King; 22 November 1834; Northamptonshire, England
- Died: 11 August 1897 (aged 62); Christchurch, New Zealand
- Occupations: Diarist; homemaker
- Spouse: John Scott Caverhill (m. 1855; died 1897)
- Children: 8
- Relatives: Leonard Isitt (son-in-law)

Hannah Rebecca Frances Caverhill (née King; 22 November 1834 – 11 August 1897) was a New Zealand diarist and homemaker. She was born in England, and emigrated to New Zealand with her family at age 16, where she began keeping a diary of her daily activities. She later married a Scottish farmer and settled in North Canterbury, where her diaries recorded the family's life and work. In 1981, her diaries were published in two volumes as A Year at Hawkswood.

== Early life ==
Caverhill was born in either Leamington Spa, Warwickshire or Harlestone, Northamptonshire, in England on 22 November 1834. Her parents were Martha Wykes and John King, a farmer, and she was one of four children. Her father died when she was a child and when she was 16 the family emigrated to New Zealand on the Cressy and settled in Lyttelton. Her mother established a boarding house, and Caverhill began keeping a diary of her daily activities: visiting friends, going for walks and picnics, singing at concerts, and playing the organ at Lyttelton Church. She kept this habit for the rest of her life.

== Family and diaries ==
On 27 February 1855 Frances married John Scott Caverhill, a farmer, explorer and valuer, of Scottish descent. They moved to Motunau in North Canterbury where they had their first three children, and from there to Hawkswood and in 1872 to Highfield Station, still in North Canterbury. They had five more children and acquired a reputation for hospitality. Caverhill's diaries at this time describe the hard work of homemaking and motherhood: making jams, pickles and other preserves, laundry days, supervising the household chores, sewing and knitting, and looking after the children. The family had no servants although a governess was engaged to teach the children until they were old enough to be sent to boarding school. Caverhill taught her children music and supervised their lessons, and as a devout Christian, held prayers for the family and servants every Sunday. She also acted as her husband's secretary in business matters. Both she and her husband were often unwell and she recorded their ailments in her diary.

In 1877 the family moved to the North Island where they farmed wheat in the Hāwera district and settled near New Plymouth. Her husband lost most of the family's money in valueless purchases of land and in early 1897 they moved to Christchurch, where he died on 17 April 1897 and she died on 11 August 1897. They were both buried at Linwood Cemetery. Their eldest daughter, Agnes, married the reverend and politician Leonard Isitt.

In 1981, Caverhill's diaries for the year 1865 were published in two volumes by the Nag's Head Press in Christchurch as A Year At Hawkswood.
