= 1889 Christchurch North by-election =

New Zealand by-election

The Christchurch North by-election of 1889 was a by-election held to elect a member to the New Zealand House of Representatives' 10th session. It was held to fill the gap left by Sir Julius Vogel, the former Premier of New Zealand, by resigning from the Christchurch North electorate.

Samuel Charles Jolly, who in 1884 had contested Ashburton, was one of the candidates campaigning for election, but after he was poorly received at public meetings did not proceed to nomination.

The election was held on 19 June 1889 and the official result was released the following day at noon, declaring Edward Humphreys as the elected representative.

1889 Christchurch North by-election
Party	Candidate	Votes	%	±%
Independent	Edward Humphreys	403	41.76	
Independent	John Ollivier	378	39.17	
Independent	Eden George	184	19.07	
Majority		25	2.59	
Turnout		965		
