= James Stuart-Wortley (New Zealand politician) =

New Zealand politician

The Honourable James Stuart-Wortley JP

Member of Parliament for Christchurch Country
- In office 1853–1855 Serving with Jerningham Wakefield
- Preceded by: New constituency
- Succeeded by: Dingley Askham Brittin; John Hall

Personal details
- Born: James Frederick Stuart-Wortley; 16 January 1833 York, England
- Died: 27 November 1870 (aged 37)
- Parent(s): John Stuart-Wortley, 2nd Baron Wharncliffe; Lady Georgiana Elizabeth Ryder
- Relatives: Edward Montagu-Stuart-Wortley-Mackenzie, 1st Earl of Wharncliffe (brother); Charles James Stuart-Wortley (uncle); James Stuart-Wortley (uncle); Dudley Ryder, 1st Earl of Harrowby (grandfather)

James Frederick Stuart-Wortley JP (16 January 1833 – 27 November 1870) was a politician in New Zealand and the UK. He was New Zealand's inaugural Baby of the House and remains the youngest member of parliament in the country's history; in fact he was too young (at 20 years and 7 months) to even be legally elected at the time.

== Early life ==
Stuart-Wortley was born in York, United Kingdom, on 16 January 1833 and was the third son of the 2nd Lord Wharncliffe and his wife, Lady Georgiana Elizabeth Ryder. He was the younger brother of the 1st Earl of Wharncliffe (1827–1899). Charles James Stuart-Wortley and James Stuart-Wortley were his uncles. Dudley Ryder, 1st Earl of Harrowby was his maternal grandfather.

== Career ==
In 1850, he travelled to New Zealand as a colonist on the Charlotte Jane, one of the First Four Ships sent by the Canterbury Association. In his first year, he lived with other bachelors in Lyttelton—Charles Bowen, Thomas Hanmer, and Charles Maunsell—in a place dubbed "Singleton House" by Charlotte Godley.

He bought 500 acres (200 ha) of land at Tai Tapu near Halswell. In October 1852, he purchased Run 53, located between Lake Ellesmere / Te Waihora and the Selwyn River. He on-sold the land in June 1853 and it became part of the Harman and Davie's Station. Stuart-Wortley then started Hawkeswood Station in partnership with others. This station was located north of the Waiau Uwha River.

=== New Zealand parliament ===
New Zealand Parliament
| Years | Term | Electorate | Party |
|---|---|---|---|
| 1853–1855 | 1st | Christchurch Country | Independent |

On 27 August 1853, Stuart-Wortley was elected to the 1st New Zealand Parliament as a representative of the Christchurch Country electorate, which consisted of rural Canterbury and much of Westland. Henry Sewell, who kept a "secret" journal, (Note: The journal was written for friends and family in England, and Sewell asked that it only be published after his death. It was not before 1920 that his journal became accessible through a library, and 1980 before it was published as a book with two volumes.) recorded the following about the young man's candidacy:

There is doubt whether he is actually of age. The Peerage says no, but he says yes, and upon the best authority, namely that of his family lawyers.

Stuart-Wortley was 20 years and 7 months when elected; so was not yet 21, the minimum age to qualify as an elector.

After the first session of Parliament finished in August 1854, Stuart-Wortley travelled with Frederick Weld from Auckland (where Parliament met in those years) to Tauranga, Maketu, and Rotorua. He resigned his seat on 18 July 1855 and returned to the United Kingdom. His seat stayed vacant until the next election, which was held on 20 December 1855 in the Christchurch Country electorate.

=== Return to England ===
He was appointed a justice of the peace in early 1858. He returned to England later in 1858.

In the UK, he stood for election to the House of Commons at the 1865 general election, when he was an unsuccessful Conservative Party candidate for Sheffield.

== Personal life ==
Stuart-Wortley died in England in November 1870, aged 37. His elder brother Edward built St Mary and St John's Church, Hardraw as a memorial to him.

== Notes ==
New Zealand Parliament
| New constituency | Member of Parliament for Christchurch Country; 1853–1855; Served alongside: Jerningham Wakefield | Succeeded by Dingley Askham Brittin; John Hall |
