= 1861–1862 Fox ministry =

Former government of New Zealand

The Second Fox Ministry was a responsible government which held power in New Zealand from July 1861 to August 1862. Although William Fox was the head of the government, he was never appointed Premier as that office had yet to be established. Instead, he was Attorney-General and then Colonial Secretary.

== Background ==
The Second Fox Ministry took power after winning a motion of no confidence against Edward Stafford by two votes amid rising tensions with the Kingitanga movement. The new government survived another no-confidence motion a month later, surviving by reconstructing the Cabinet with the absence of Isaac Featherston and John Williamson – it had been argued by the Opposition that they were ineligible for office in the central government as they were both Provincial Superintendents. Even without the Superintendents, Fox's ministry was highly provincialist in policy, amending the New Provinces Act to prevent existing provinces from splintering into non-viable local entities.

The major crisis of New Zealand politics in the 1860s was the Māori question, with Fox leading the 'Peace Party' which was purported to prefer a non-violent resolution to the dispute with the Waikato iwi. This would involve incorporating Māori into Pākeha-style constitutional institutions such as local councils or Rūnanga. Previously, Māori policy had been reserved to the Governor, but now Governor Grey convinced the ministry to take on responsibility for this aspect of national politics. To Fox's surprise, the British government responded by giving notice that the New Zealand colonial government would have to fund their own military defences against Māori, while the Imperial troops would be withdrawn.

This ultimatum had the impact of weakening the authority of the Fox Ministry, and Stafford was able to defeat the government in a no-confidence vote a year after Fox had taken office, although only by means of the Speaker's casting vote. Stafford declined to form a new government and Grey appointed Alfred Domett instead.

== Ministers ==
The following members served in the Fox Ministry:

Name	Portrait	Office	Term
William Fox		Attorney-General	12 July 1861 – 2 August 1861
William Fox		Colonial Secretary	2 August 1861 – 6 August 1862
Isaac Featherston		Colonial Secretary	12 July 1861 – 2 August 1861
Reader Wood		Colonial Treasurer	12 July 1861 – 6 August 1862
Reader Wood		Commissioner of Customs	12 July 1861 – 6 August 1862
Walter Mantell		Minister of Native Affairs	12 July 1861 – 18 December 1861
John Williamson		Member of Executive Council	12 July 1861 – 2 August 1861
Thomas Henderson		Member of Executive Council	12 July 1861 – 6 August 1862
Daniel Pollen, MLC		Member of Executive Council	20 July 1861 – 6 August 1862
Henry Sewell, MLC		Attorney-General	2 August 1861 – 6 August 1862
Crosbie Ward		Postmaster-General	2 August 1861 – 6 August 1862
Crosbie Ward		Secretary for Crown Lands	2 August 1861 – 6 August 1862
Lt.-Gen. Duncan Cameron		Member of Executive Council	22 April 1861 – 6 August 1862

== See also ==
- New Zealand Government
