= Leonard Isitt (minister) =

New Zealand politician (1855–1937)

The Reverend Leonard Isitt
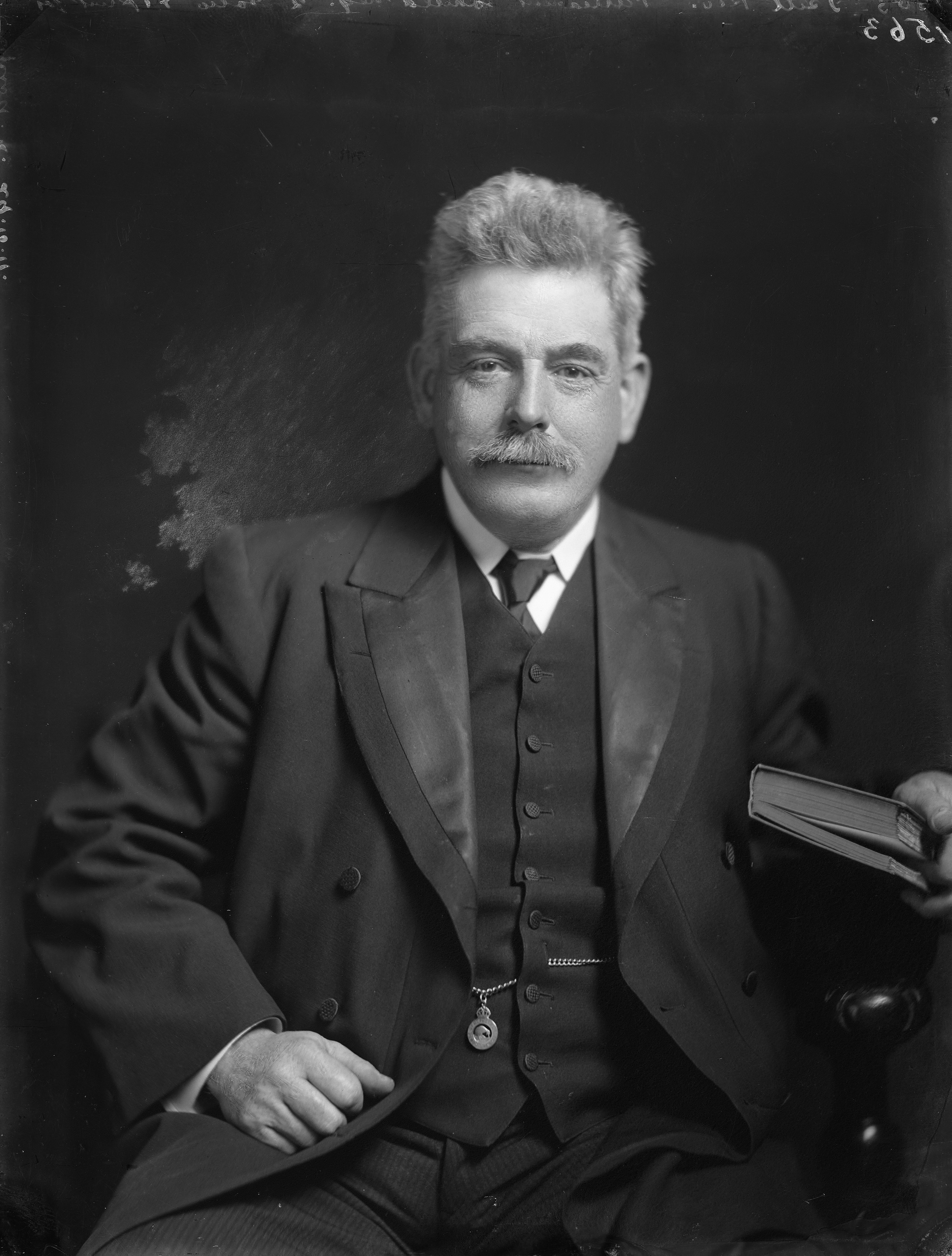
- Isitt in 1911

Member of the New Zealand Parliament for Christchurch North
- In office 1911–1925
- Preceded by: Tommy Taylor
- Succeeded by: Henry Holland

New Zealand Legislative Councillor
- In office 28 October 1925 – 29 July 1937†
- Appointed by: Gordon Coates

Personal details
- Born: 4 January 1855 Bedford, England
- Died: 29 July 1937 (aged 82) Christchurch, New Zealand
- Resting place: Linwood Cemetery
- Party: Liberal
- Spouse: Agnes Caverhill
- Relations: Frank Isitt (brother); Kate Isitt (niece)
- Children: 2 inc. Sir Leonard Isitt
- Profession: Minister of religion

Rev. Leonard Monk Isitt (4 January 1855 – 29 July 1937) was a Member of Parliament of the New Zealand Liberal Party. He was a Methodist minister and an advocate of prohibition (temperance), in association with Tommy Taylor and his brother, Rev. Frank Isitt.

== Early life ==
He was born in Bedford, England, in 1855. His parents were James Isitt, a butcher, and Rebecca Isitt (née Cole). He lost his father at age two and his mother when he was twelve. He was educated at Bedford Modern School. His brother Frank emigrated to New Zealand in 1870 as a Methodist minister, and in 1875, Leonard Isitt followed him. His brother's daughter, Kate Isitt, later worked for him as his private secretary.

== Member of Parliament ==
New Zealand Parliament
Years	Term	Electorate	Party
1911	17th	Christchurch North	Independent Liberal
1911–1914	18th	Christchurch North	Independent Liberal
1914–1919	19th	Christchurch North	Liberal
1919–1922	20th	Christchurch North	Liberal
1922–1925	21st	Christchurch North	Liberal

Leonard Isitt took over Taylor's parliamentary electorate of Christchurch North in a 1911 by-election after Tommy Taylor died. He held the seat, first as an independent then as a Liberal until he retired in 1925.

Isitt was a member of the Legislative Council from 1925 to his death in 1937. Isitt and George Witty were both appointed to the Legislative Council by Gordon Coates on 28 October 1925; shortly before the 1925 election on 4 November. Both were Liberals but their retirement removed "a source of some bitterness from the Party’s ranks". Gordon Coates was Reform, and both of their former seats went to Reform candidates.

After Witty, Henry Holland of the Reform Party represented the Christchurch North electorate.

In 1935, he was awarded the King George V Silver Jubilee Medal.

== Family and death ==
Isitt married Agnes Caverhill on 14 May 1881 at New Plymouth. Her parents were Frances and John Caverhill. They had two sons and one daughter. Frances (Note: Registered as Frances on birth, death and marriage certificates but shown as Francis on the family's gravestone at Linwood Cemetery) Isitt (1889–1960) was their eldest child. Sir Leonard Isitt (1891–1976) became a prominent Air Force commander. Willard Isitt (1894–1916), a rifleman in the New Zealand Rifle Brigade, was killed during World War I in France on 31 October 1916. Their daughter was the mother to Sir Leonard Thornton who became Chief of Defence Staff for the New Zealand Defence Force.

Leonard Isitt died on 29 July 1937 in Christchurch and was buried at Linwood Cemetery. His wife died a year later at their residence in Cashmere.

== Notes ==
New Zealand Parliament
Preceded by Tommy Taylor	Member of Parliament for Christchurch North; 1911–1925	Succeeded by Henry Holland
