= Frank Isitt =

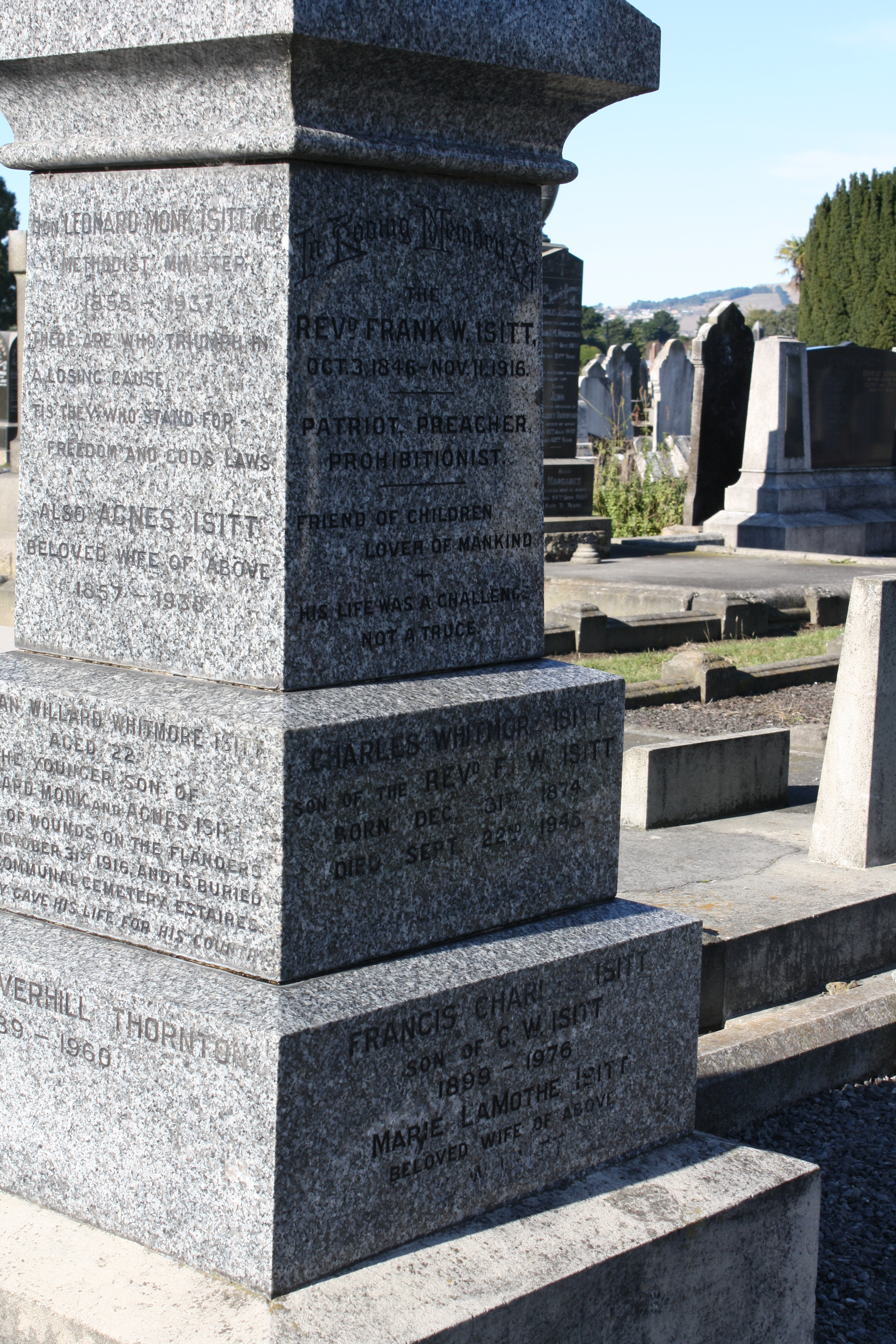
Isitt family grave in Linwood Cemetery with Leonard Monk Isitt and Agnes Isitt on the left, and Frank Isitt, son Charles Whitmore Isitt, and grandson Francis Charles Isitt on the right

Rev Francis Whitmore Isitt (1843 – 11 November 1916) was a New Zealand Methodist minister, who was general secretary of the New Zealand Alliance (for prohibition) from 1900 to 1909. He was a brother of the Rev Leonard Isitt.

Rev Frank Isitt entered the ministry from the Sydenham Circuit, London and after a term at Richmond College went to New Zealand in 1871. He was a parish minister for a number of years, but after two breakdowns in health concentrated on temperance work. He stood in the 1902 election as a prohibition candidate for ten seats, and came second in eight. He also stood in the 1905 and 1908 elections.

In February 1874 he married 22-year-old Mary Campbell Purdie in Upper Kaikorai, Dunedin. One of their children, Kate Isitt, became a novelist and journalist for the Manchester Guardian newspaper. His grandson, Francis Charles Isitt, stood for Social Credit in the Timaru electorate in the 1957 election and 1960 elections.
