= Christchurch Country =

Christchurch Country was a parliamentary electorate in the Canterbury region of New Zealand from 1853 to 1860. It was thus one of the original 24 electorates used for the 1st New Zealand Parliament.

== Geography ==
The area covered by the Christchurch Country electorate was synonymous with the original area of Canterbury Province, i.e. covering all land from the east coast to the west coast of the South Island that lay north of Otago Province (covered by the Dunedin Country electorate) and south of Nelson Province (covered by the Wairau electorate on the east coast; the west coast was virtually uninhibited by Europeans and initially not covered by an electorate). Thus, the Christchurch Country electorate extended from Awarua Point to the Grey River on the West Coast, and from the Waitaki River to the Hurunui River. Three settlements within Canterbury Province were covered by their own electorates, namely Town of Christchurch (covering an area now to be considered the central city), Town of Lyttelton, and Akaroa (which covered the eastern half of Banks Peninsula).

== History ==
The electorate was created for the first Parliament as a two-member electorate.

The nomination meeting for the first election was held on 16 August 1853 at the Christchurch Land Office, together with the nomination meeting for the Town of Christchurch electorate. The first election was held on Saturday, 27 August between 9 am and 4 pm at the Resident Magistrate's Office in Christchurch, with Charles Simeon acting as the returning officer. James Stuart-Wortley and Jerningham Wakefield were the first two representatives, with Guise Brittan being defeated. Wakefield served until the end of the parliamentary term. Stuart-Wortley resigned on 18 July 1855. As Parliament was dissolved on 15 September 1855, no by-election was held to fill the vacancy.

For the 1855 election, the nomination meeting for both the Christchurch Country and the Town of Christchurch electorates was held in the Market Place on Tuesday, 18 December. Charles Bowen acted as returning officer. Four candidates were proposed for the Christchurch Country electorate, and the election date was set for Thursday, 20 December. Henry Sewell was the only candidate for the Town of Christchurch electorate, and he was declared elected. Two days later, polling booths were in Christchurch, Lyttelton, and Kaiapoi, and the successful candidates were John Hall and Dingley Askham Brittin, who defeated John Ollivier and Crosbie Ward. Hall later became New Zealand's 12th Premier (1879–82).

=== Members of Parliament ===
The electorate was represented by seven Members of Parliament.

Key

Independent

Election	Winners	
1853 election	Jerningham Wakefield	James Stuart-Wortley
1855 election	Dingley Askham Brittin	John Hall
1856 by-election	John Ollivier	John Hall
1860 first by-election	Isaac Cookson	John Hall
1860 second by-election	Isaac Cookson	Charles Hunter Brown

== Election results ==
=== 1856 by-election ===
1856 Christchurch Country by-election
Party	Candidate	Votes	%	±%
Independent	John Ollivier	191	61.4	
Independent	Crosbie Ward	120	38.6	
Turnout		311		
Majority		71		

=== 1855 election ===
1855 general election: Christchurch Country
Party	Candidate	Votes	%	±%
Independent	John Hall	241	64.87	
Independent	Dingley Askham Brittin	208	55.99	
Independent	John Ollivier	177	47.64	
Independent	Crosbie Ward	117	31.49	
Majority		31 (Note: Majority is difference between lowest winning poll (Brittin – 208) and highest losing poll (Ollivier – 177).)	8.34	
Turnout		372 (Note: As electors had two votes each, turnout is assumed to be the sum of votes divided by two.)		
Registered electors				

Table footnotes:

=== 1853 election ===
1853 general election: Christchurch Country
Party	Candidate	Votes	%	±%
Independent	James Stuart-Wortley	131	41.32	
Independent	Jerningham Wakefield	123	38.80	
Independent	Guise Brittan	63	19.87	
Majority		60 (Note: Majority is difference between lowest winning poll (Wakefield – 123) and highest losing poll (Brittan – 63).)	37.85	
Turnout		159 (Note: As electors had two votes each, turnout is assumed to be the sum of votes divided by two.)	73.38	
Registered electors		216		

Table footnotes:
