= John Ollivier =

New Zealand politician (1812–1893)

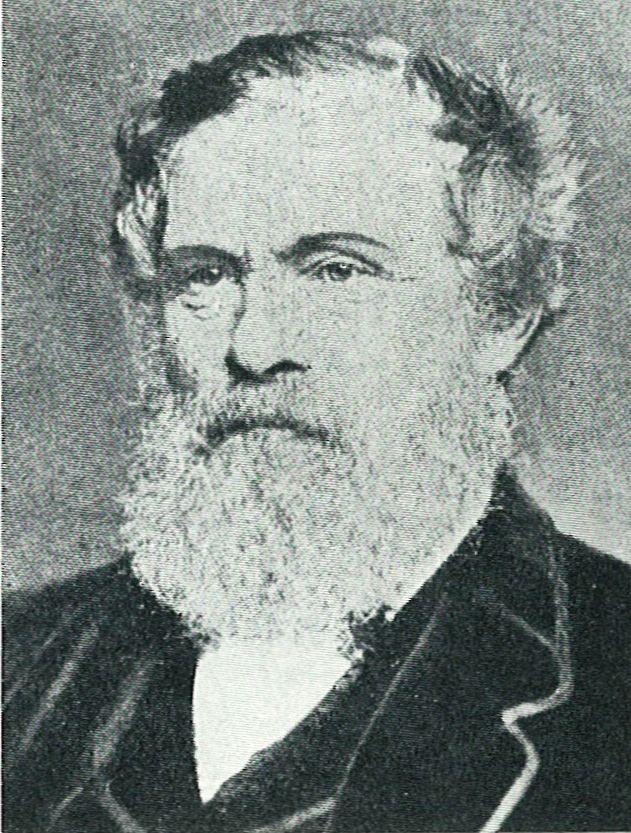
- Portrait of John Ollivier

Member of the New Zealand Parliament for Christchurch Country
- In office 1856–1860
- Preceded by: Dingley Askham Brittin
- Succeeded by: Isaac Cookson

Canterbury Provincial Council
- In office 1855–1866

2nd Chairman of the Christchurch Town Council
- In office 1863–1864
- Preceded by: John Hall
- Succeeded by: Isaac Luck

Personal details
- Born: 25 March 1812 Isle of Wight, England
- Died: 31 July 1893 (aged 81) Christchurch, New Zealand
- Spouse: Elizabeth Ollivier
- Relations: Arthur Ollivier (son)
- Children: 11

John Ollivier (25 March 1812 – 31 July 1893) was a Member of Parliament in New Zealand, but was better known for his membership of the Canterbury Provincial Council. He was the second chairman of the Christchurch Town Council.

== Early life ==
Ollivier was born in 1812 on the Isle of Wight in England. His parents were Claude Nicholas Ollivier (c.1780–c.1855) and Ann Wilby (c.1782–c.1820). Ollivier was educated in France. He worked as a publisher in London for about 20 years. The most popular work that he published was Eothen; or Traces of travel brought home from the East by Alexander William Kinglake.

He married Elizabeth Morton in 1839. They had a large family, with 10 children born before they emigrated, and one more son born in Christchurch. Their 8th son, Arthur Morton, was born in 1851 and achieved some prominence as a cricketer, mountaineer and businessman. The family came to New Zealand on the John Taylor; the ship left London on 10 July 1853 and arrived in Lyttelton on 18 October. He took up farming next to what is now known as Halswell Road, opposite the suburb of Aidanfield. After a few years, he moved into town and built a house on Ferry Road, where he lived for the rest of his life.

In Christchurch, he established himself as an auctioneer with premises in High Street. He also worked as an accountant and became known as a humorist.

== Political career ==
New Zealand Parliament
Years	Term	Electorate	Party
1856–1860	2nd	Christchurch Country	Independent

Town Council

Ollivier was elected onto the Christchurch Town Council for the period from 1863 to 1865, and was selected by his fellow councillors as their chairman for the 1863–1864 council year. He was the second chairman, and the role is the forerunner to the position of Mayor of Christchurch.

Provincial Council

Ollivier was first elected onto the Canterbury Provincial Council in 1855 for the Christchurch Country electorate. He served until the dissolution of the 1st Provincial Council in July 1857. He then stood in the Heathcote electorate and was elected onto the 2nd, 3rd and 4th Provincial Council (1857–1863). During the term of the 4th Provincial Council in early 1863, he stood in the City of Christchurch electorate, and he represented that electorate until the dissolution of the 4th Council in May 1866.

When the Superintendency of James FitzGerald came to an end in 1857, it was generally expected that Joseph Brittan would succeed him. Brittan published his political views in a long letter that appeared in the Lyttelton Times for several months. William Sefton Moorhouse announced his candidacy months later, was less experienced and the worse public speaker of the two candidates. It was Ollivier's support as a skilled orator that gained Moorhouse the Superintendency at the election on 30 October 1857 and Ollivier was regarded as the 'kingmaker'. Ollivier had a reputation as 'perhaps the best after-dinner speaker'.

Ollivier served on the Executive Council from 8 December 1857 to 8 November 1859, and again from 21 November 1859 to 2 January 1860. He was speaker of the council from 30 May 1865 to 7 May 1866.

Parliament

Ollivier contested the seat of Christchurch Country against Crosbie Ward, following the resignation of Dingley Askham Brittin. At 14 October 1856 by-election, Ollivier was returned with 191 votes, a majority of 71 over Ward. Ollivier resigned on 20 January 1860, and Isaac Cookson was returned to represent the electorate.

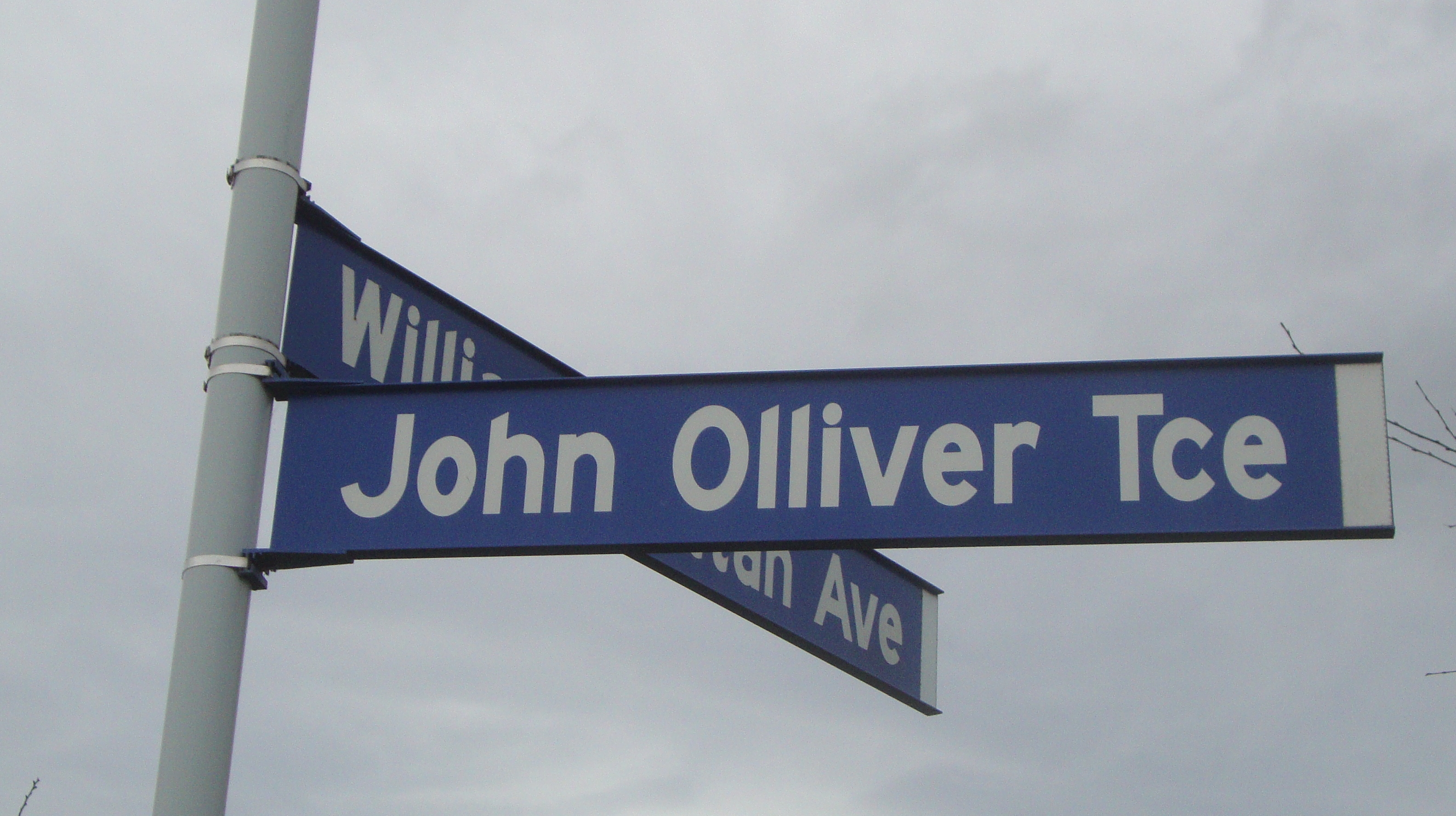
John Olliver Terrace in Halswell

Ollivier stood for parliament again late in his life. On the first occasion, the resignation of Arthur O'Callaghan from the Lincoln electorate on 9 November 1888 caused the 16 January 1889 by-election between Ollivier and Alfred Saunders. Saunders congratulated Ollivier for the humorous and witty campaign and remarked that "he had not heard a more amusing speech at a nomination than that of Mr Ollivier". Saunders won the election with 676 votes to 332.

The resignation of Sir Julius Vogel caused the 19 June 1889 by-election in the Christchurch North electorate, contested by three candidates. Edward Humphreys beat Ollivier by a small margin, with Eden George (a later mayor of Christchurch) coming a distant third.

== Death and commemoration ==
Ollivier died on 31 July 1893. He was buried at Woolston Cemetery.

John Olliver Terrace in Halswell is named after him (this is the area where he first farmed), but his surname is misspelt. The street is in a recent subdivision and the name was approved in 1999. Olliviers Road in Linwood was named after him and is located near his Ferry Road residence. The road name first appeared in a report to the Heathcote Road Board in 1877.

New Zealand Parliament
Preceded by Dingley Askham Brittin	Member of Parliament for Christchurch Country; 1856–1860; Served alongside: John Hall	Succeeded by Isaac Cookson
Political offices
Preceded by John Hall	Chairman of the Christchurch Town Council; 1863–1864	Succeeded by Isaac Luck
