= Isaac Cookson (politician) =

New Zealand politician (1817–1870)

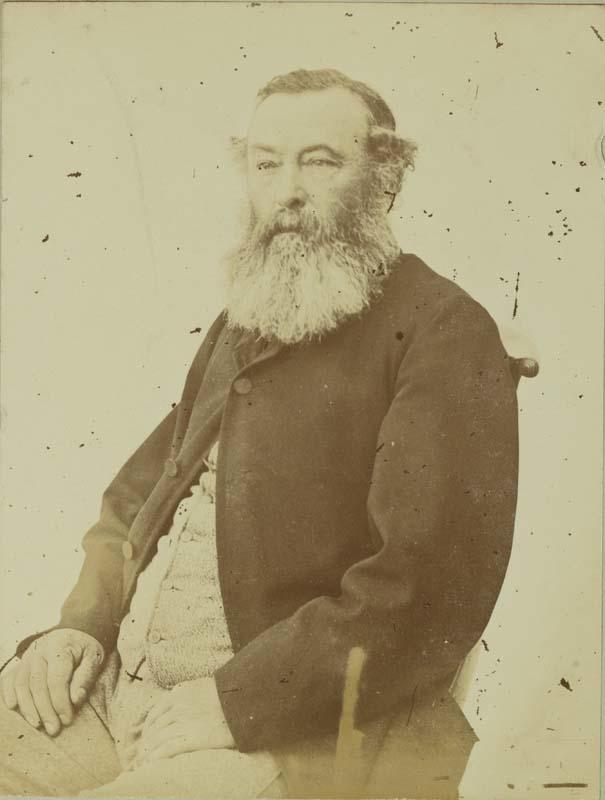

Personal details
- Born: 1817 England
- Died: 10 December 1870 (aged 52–53) Newcastle upon Tyne, England
- Relations: Sir Matthew White Ridley (father-in-law)

Isaac Thomas Cookson (1817 – 10 December 1870) was a 19th-century member of Parliament in Canterbury, New Zealand. He was a prominent merchant in early Canterbury.

== Family ==
Cookson was born in England in 1817 and he lived in Newcastle upon Tyne. His father, Thomas Cookson (1779–1863), was from Hermitage in County Durham. His mother was Elizabeth, née Earle. On 23 February 1843, he married Janetta Maria Ridley, a daughter of Sir Matthew White Ridley, 3rd Baronet. Isaac Cookson was his entrepreneurial great-great-grandfather who came to prominence in Newcastle upon Tyne.

When they arrived in New Zealand, the Cooksons had two children, a boy aged seven and a daughter aged five. Sources differ whether a further child and a newborn both died on the journey or whether one of them died just before they left England.

== Colonial life ==
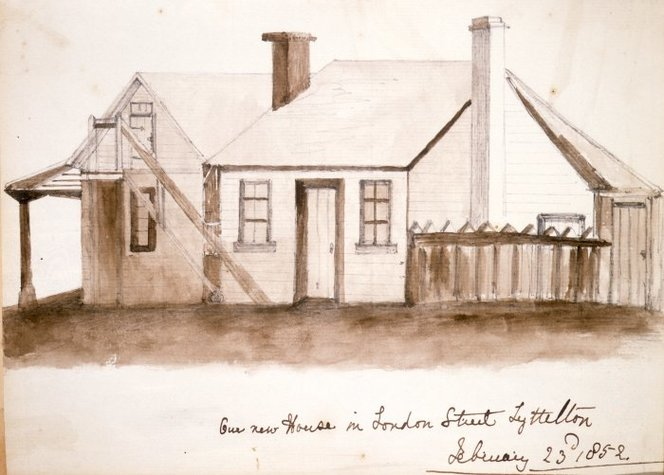
The Cooksons' house in Lyttelton in 1852

The Cookson family arrived in Canterbury's port town Lyttelton on 28 August 1851 on the Dominion from Gravesend. They first lived in London Street in Lyttelton, and sketches of their house and his office prepared by his wife are held by the National Library of New Zealand. They then moved to the Christchurch side of the Port Hills and the valley where they lived was known as Hammerton based on the name of their 40 hectares (0.40 km^{2}) property. When the Cooksons moved away after a decade, the area became known as Heathcote Valley, named after Sir William Heathcote, 5th Baronet who had been the secretary of the Canterbury Association. Cookson was a justice of the peace by 1852.

Within a month of arrival, he went into business with William Bowler in Lyttelton; his business partner would later become prominent in Wellington. In early 1852, Cookson and S. Fisher were the first to bring bees to Christchurch; they brought a hive down each from Nelson. Cookson and Bowler took up two runs in North Canterbury in mid-1852 but sold both of them a year later. The Warren was located on the south bank of the Eyre River and covered just under 12,000 acres (4,900 ha). Their other run, Carleton, was located between the Eyre and Cust Rivers and covered 8,000 acres (3,200 ha).

In 1859, Cookson was the first president of the Canterbury Chamber of Commerce.

== Political career ==
New Zealand Parliament
Years	Term	Electorate	Party
1860	2nd	Christchurch Country	Independent
1861–1863	3rd	Kaiapoi	Independent

Cookson represented the Christchurch Country electorate in 1860 following the resignation of John Ollivier, and then the Kaiapoi electorate from 1861 to 1863, when he resigned.

He was a member of the Canterbury Provincial Council and represented the Town of Lyttelton electorate (1853–1861) and then the City of Christchurch electorate (1861–1862). Cookson resigned from his political roles in October 1862 as he had received news of his only daughter Louisa having fallen seriously ill in Europe. The Superintendent of the Canterbury Province, James FitzGerald, presided over a private dinner on 13 October attended by some 60 people. The Cooksons did not get to see their daughter again as she died on 22 November 1862 in Pau in southern France.

== Death ==
Janetta Cookson died on a journey to South America in late 1866. After leaving Saint Thomas, one of the Virgin Islands in the Caribbean Sea, she fell ill and died within a couple of days. Isaac Cookson died on 10 December 1870 at Newcastle upon Tyne. (Note: There are several reliable sources that state that he died in 1881 and other reliable sources state that he died in 1870. As his will concerning his New Zealand estate was presided over by Justice Henry Barnes Gresson in March 1873, with his son Walter Selby Cookson as the executor, the 1870 death year is the one that is correct.) His will concerning his New Zealand affairs was presided over by Justice Henry Barnes Gresson in March 1873.

== Notes ==
New Zealand Parliament
Preceded by John Ollivier	Member of Parliament for Christchurch Country; 1860; Served alongside: John Hall, Charles Hunter Brown	Constituency abolished
New constituency	Member of Parliament for Kaiapoi; 1861–1863	Succeeded by Robert Wilkin
