= Kate Isitt (journalist) =

New Zealand journalist and writer

- Born: Kate Evelyn Isitt; 20 July 1876; New Plymouth, New Zealand
- Died: 24 January 1948 (aged 71); London, England
- Occupations: Novelist and journalist
- Relatives: Frank Isitt (father); Leonard Isitt (uncle)

Kate Evelyn Isitt (20 July 1876 – 24 January 1948) was a New Zealand journalist and writer.

== Biography ==
Isitt was born in New Plymouth, New Zealand, on 20 July 1876, to Francis Whitmore Isitt and Mary Campbell Isitt (née Purdie). Her father was a Wesleyan minister and the family moved around the country for a number of years. She completed her secondary schooling at Nelson College for Girls in 1891.

She worked for her uncle, Member of Parliament and leader of the prohibition movement Leonard Isitt, in Wellington in the early 1900s as his private secretary. Isitt later wrote a novel based on the development of the Prohibition movement, Patmos, which was published in 1905 under the pseudonym Kathleen Inglewood.

From 1907 to 1910 Isitt was a reporter for the Wellington newspaper The Dominion and its first women's page editor. Under the name "Dominica" she wrote a regular feature titled "Women's World – Matters of Interest from Far and Near". She also founded the Wellington Pioneer Club for women.

In 1910 Isitt travelled to England and came into contact with other expatriate writers such as Dora Wilcox and Edith Searle Grossmann. She continued to work as a journalist as London correspondent for the Manchester Guardian newspaper. She wrote for the newspaper until her retirement in 1944.

Isitt died in Kensington, London, in 1948.
