= Isaac Cookson (foundryman) =

English iron and brass foundryman (1679–1743)

Isaac Cookson (1679–1743) was the founder of Cookson Group, a United Kingdom-based materials technology businesses.

== Career ==
Baptised and brought up in Penrith, Isaac Cookson moved to Newcastle upon Tyne in 1704 to further his career. In partnership with his brother William, he acquired land at Little Clifton near Workington in Cumberland in 1721, and built a foundry on it: by 1750 this foundry was making "a very great profit". Also in 1721, in partnership with Joseph Button, he established a facility for casting iron and brass in Gateshead.

Then in 1728, using land he had leased in 1722, together with Joseph Airey, he took over and expanded the Dagnia Flint Glasshouse in Newcastle upon Tyne: by the 1730s he was operating a separate glasshouse in South Shields.

It was this collection of businesses which Isaac Cookson's descendants built into one of the largest materials technology businesses in the United Kingdom.

He died in Newcastle upon Tyne in 1743.

He should not be confused with his namesake, some 26 years younger (born 1705, died 1754), who was also born in Penrith and lived in Newcastle, who was one of the most notable silversmiths of the time.

== Family ==
In 1709 he married Hannah Buston and together they had five children.
