= John Hall (New Zealand politician) =

Premier of New Zealand from 1879 to 1882

The Honourable Sir John Hall KCMG
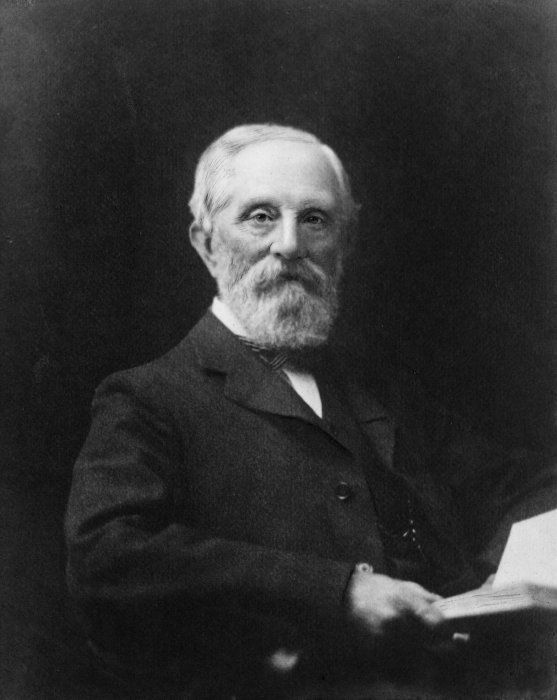

12th Premier of New Zealand
- In office 8 October 1879 – 21 April 1882
- Monarch: Victoria
- Governor: Sir Hercules Robinson; Sir Arthur Hamilton-Gordon
- Preceded by: Sir George Grey (1879)
- Succeeded by: Frederick Whitaker (1882)
- Constituency: Selwyn

4th Colonial Secretary of New Zealand
- In office 20 May 1856 – 2 June 1856
- Governor: Sir Thomas Gore Browne

1st Chairman of the Christchurch Town Council
- In office 1862–1863
- Succeeded by: John Ollivier

26th Mayor of Christchurch
- In office 1906–1907
- Preceded by: Charles Gray
- Succeeded by: George Payling

Personal details
- Born: 18 December 1824 Kingston upon Hull, England
- Died: 25 June 1907 (aged 82) Christchurch, New Zealand
- Resting place: St John's Church cemetery, Hororata
- Party: Independent, leaning conservative
- Spouse: Rose Dryden (m. 1861; died 1900)
- Children: 5
- Relatives: George Williamson Hall (brother); Mary Grigg (granddaughter); Thomas Hall (nephew)

Sir John Hall KCMG (c. 18 December 1824 – 25 June 1907) was a New Zealand politician who served as the 12th premier of New Zealand from 1879 to 1882. He was born in Kingston upon Hull, England, the third son of George Hall, a captain in the navy. At the age of ten he was sent to school in Switzerland and his education continued in Paris and Hamburg. After returning to England and being employed by the Post Office, at the age of 27 he decided to emigrate. He was also Mayor of Christchurch.

== Migration to New Zealand ==
After reading a book on sheep farming, Hall emigrated to New Zealand, on the Samarang, arriving in Lyttelton on 31 July 1852. His brothers George and Thomas followed him to New Zealand soon after. He developed one of the first large scale sheep farming runs in Canterbury.

== Political offices ==
New Zealand Parliament
Years	Term	Electorate	Party
1855–1860	2nd	Christchurch Country	Independent
1866–1870	4th	Heathcote	Independent
1871–1872	5th	Heathcote	Independent
1879–1881	7th	Selwyn	Independent
1881–1883	8th	Selwyn	Independent
1887–1890	10th	Selwyn	Independent
1890–1893	11th	Ellesmere	Independent

In 1853, he was elected to the Canterbury Provincial Council. He would later rise through the ranks of magistrate, was the first town council Chairman in Christchurch (the forerunner to the position of mayor, 1862 and 1863), and Postmaster-General. In Parliament he represented the electorates of Christchurch Country 1855–60 (resigned in early 1860), Heathcote 1866–70 & 1871–72 (resigned), Selwyn 1879–83 (resigned) & 1887–90, and Ellesmere 1890–93 (retired).

In the 1865–66 election, he contested the Heathcote electorate against G. Buckley, and they received 338 and 239 votes, respectively.

Hall was a member of the Legislative Council from 1876 to 1879 before resigning, wishing to re-enter the lower house. Thinking his previous seat of Heathcote unsuitable for his candidacy he accepted the offer of the retiring Cecil Fitzroy to stand in his vacated seat of Selwyn and was elected for it unopposed at the 1879 general election. At the same election the opposition leader, William Fox, was defeated leading Fox to invite Hall to succeed him on 6 September. Hall accepted the leadership and at the first opposition caucus following the election he was confirmed as leader, being elected unanimously.

=== Premier of New Zealand ===
On 8 October 1879, he was appointed the Premier of New Zealand, where his ministry carried out reforms of the male suffrage (extending voting rights) and dealt with a conflict between settlers and Māori at Parihaka, although poor health caused him to resign the position less than three years later. In the 1882 Birthday Honours, he was appointed a Knight Commander of the Order of St Michael and St George.

=== Immigration ===
Although Chinese immigrants were invited to New Zealand by the Dunedin Chamber of Commerce, prejudice against them quickly led to calls for restrictions on immigration. Following the example of anti-Chinese poll taxes enacted by California in 1852 and by Australian states in the 1850s, 1860s and 1870s, John Hall's government passed the Chinese Immigration Act 1881. This imposed a £10 tax per Chinese person entering New Zealand, and permitted only one Chinese immigrant for every 10 tons of cargo. Richard Seddon's government increased the tax to £100 per head in 1896, and tightened the other restriction to only one Chinese immigrant for every 200 tons of cargo.

=== Women's suffrage ===
Hall took an active interest in women's rights. He moved the Parliamentary Bill that gave women in New Zealand the vote (1893), (the first country in the world to do so), he became the honorary Mayor of Christchurch, for the New Zealand International Exhibition from 1 November 1906 to 15 April 1907.

== Personal life and death ==
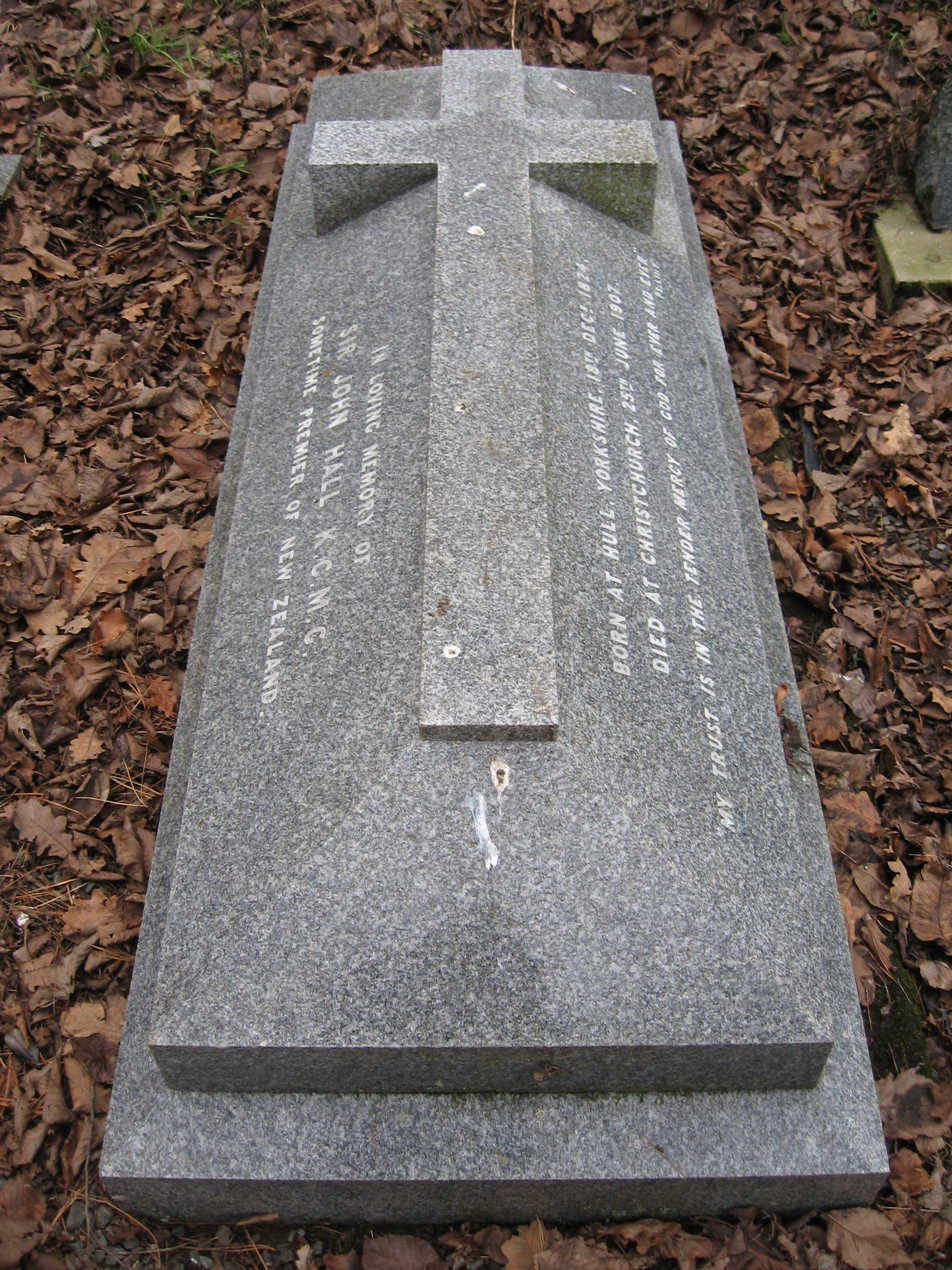
Hall's grave

Despite the distances involved, Hall made several visits back to England and maintained his contacts there, especially with the Leathersellers' Company, of which he was a Liveryman for 55 years. A long-time advocate of electoral reform, he addressed a proportional representation meeting in London (England) in 1894.

Hall had married Rose Dryden in England, daughter of William Dryden of Kingston upon Hull, after returning there in 1860. They went back to New Zealand in 1863. They had five children and one of their granddaughters, Mary Grigg, later became an MP for the National Party.

Hall died in Christchurch on 25 June 1907, shortly after the International Exhibition had finished. He is buried in the St. John's Church cemetery in Hororata.

== Sources ==
- Garner, Jean (1995). By His Own Merits. Hororata: Dryden Press. ISBN 0-473-03543-X.
- Garner, Jean (1993). Sir John Hall: Pioneer, pastoralist and politician (PDF) (PhD). Christchurch: University of Canterbury.
- A. B. White, rev. Elizabeth Baigent. "Hall, Sir John (1824–1907)". Oxford Dictionary of National Biography (online ed.). Oxford University Press. doi:10.1093/ref:odnb/33655. (Subscription, Wikipedia Library access or UK public library membership required.)

Government offices
Preceded by Henry Sewell	Colonial Secretary of New Zealand; 1856	Succeeded by William Richmond
Preceded by George Grey	Premier of New Zealand; 1879–1882	Succeeded by Frederick Whitaker
New Zealand Parliament
Preceded by Jerningham Wakefield; James Stuart-Wortley	Member of Parliament for Christchurch Country; 1855–1860; Served alongside: Dingley Askham Brittin, John Ollivier, Isaac Cookson	Succeeded by Charles Hunter Brown
Preceded by Alfred Cox	Member of Parliament for Heathcote; 1866–1872	Succeeded by John Cracroft Wilson
Preceded by Cecil Fitzroy	Member of Parliament for Selwyn; 1879–1883 1887–1890	Succeeded by Edward Lee
Preceded by Edward Wakefield	Member of Parliament for Selwyn; 1879–1883 1887–1890	Succeeded by Alfred Saunders
In abeyance Title last held by James FitzGerald	Member of Parliament for Ellesmere; 1890–1893	Succeeded by William Montgomery
Political offices
First	Chairman of the Christchurch Town Council; 1862–1863	Succeeded by John Ollivier
Preceded by James Paterson	Postmaster-General; 1866–1869 1879–1881	Succeeded by Edward Stafford
Preceded by James Temple Fisher	Postmaster-General; 1866–1869 1879–1881	Succeeded by Walter Johnston
New title	Electric Telegraph Commissioner; 1866–1869	Succeeded by Edward Stafford
Preceded by James Temple Fisher	Commissioner of Telegraphs; 1879–1881	Succeeded by Walter Johnston
Preceded by Charles Gray	Mayor of Christchurch; 1906–1907	Succeeded by George Payling
