= Bessie Acland =

New Zealand woman artist

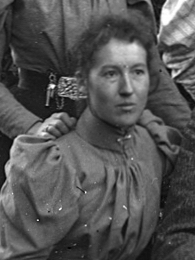
- Acland in 1890
- Born: Elizabeth Dyke Acland; 23 September 1870; Mount Peel Station, South Canterbury, New Zealand
- Died: 13 September 1959 (aged 88); San Diego, California, United States
- Other name: Bessie Dunn
- Parents: John Acland; Emily Acland
- Relatives: Bishop Harper (grandfather); Sir Thomas Dyke Acland, Bt (grandfather); Hugh Acland (brother); Walter Empson (brother-in-law); Jack Acland (nephew); Leonard Harper (uncle); Henry Harper (uncle); Walter Harper (uncle); George Harper (uncle); Eric Harper (cousin); Arthur Paul Harper (cousin); John Ernest Harper (cousin)

Elizabeth Dyke Dunn (née Acland; 23 September 1870 – 13 September 1959) was a New Zealand artist. For the last 38 years of her life, she lived in San Diego, California.

== Biography ==
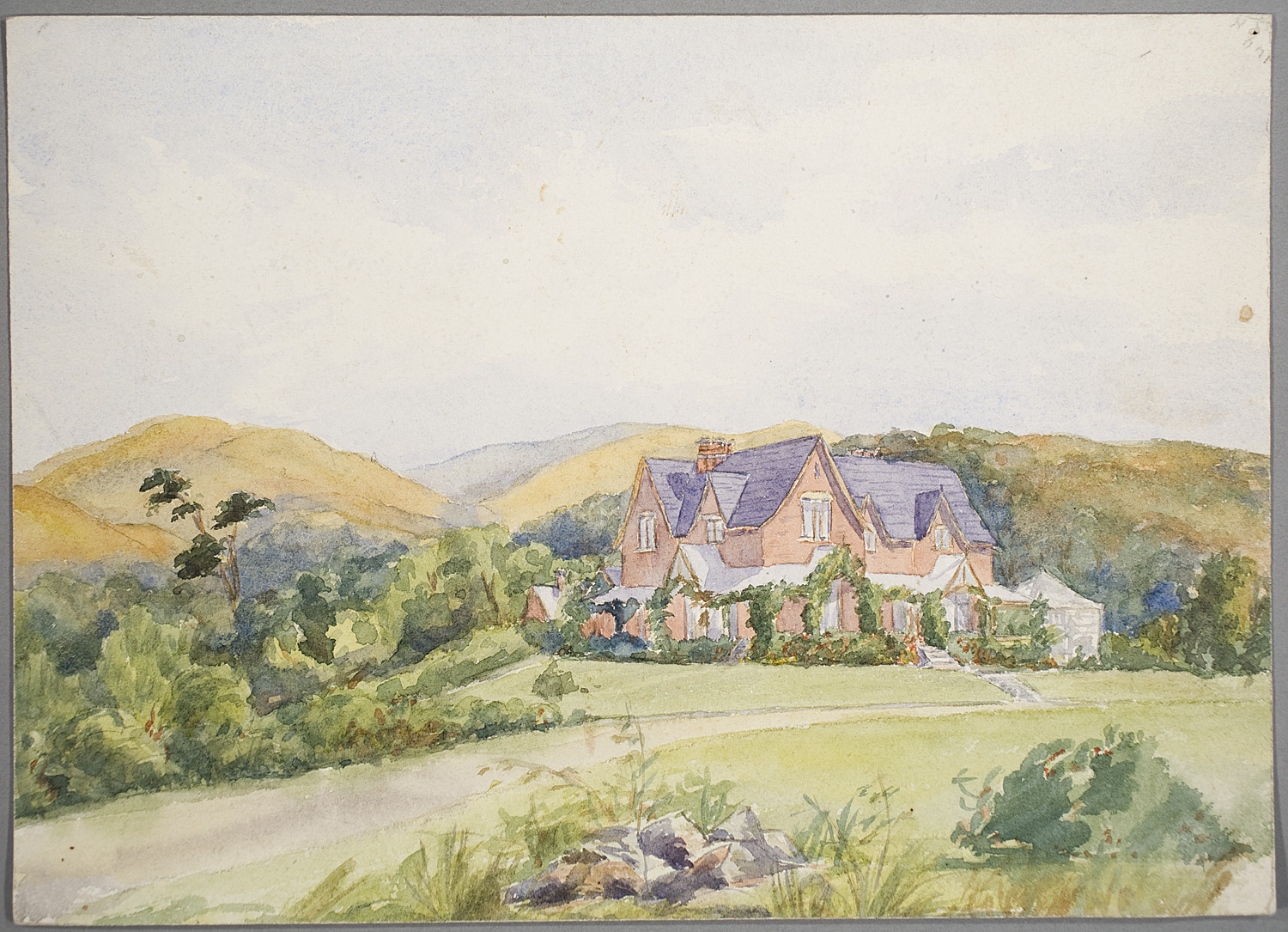
Holnicote House of Mount Peel Station (c. 1880s)

Dunn was born Elizabeth Dyke Acland on 23 September 1870 at Holnicote House, the homestead of Mount Peel Station inland from Peel Forest in South Canterbury, New Zealand. She was the tenth child of the Honourable John Barton Arundel Acland and Emily Harper, who was also a painter. In 1896, she married Charles Arthur Dunn, a painter, son of Reverend James Dunn and Angelina Anne Dyke Troyte, at the Church of the Holy Innocents that belongs to Mount Peel Station. They had two children. They spent time at Mount Peel Station in South Canterbury, before moving to live in California in 1921.

She was exhibited as Bessie Acland at the Canterbury Society of Arts from 1893 to 1896. Following her marriage, she exhibited as Bessie Dunn, at Canterbury Society of Arts in 1909, 1910, 1911, 1912, 1914, and the New Zealand Academy of Fine Arts from 1901 to 1904. Several watercolour landscapes are in the Hocken Collection, the University of Otago.

She died in San Diego, California, on 13 September 1959, where she lived from 1921 until her death.
