= George Harper (lawyer) =

New Zealand lawyer

Sir George Harper OBE
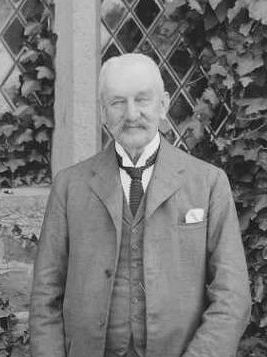
- Harper in the 1920s
- Born: 24 April 1843; Stratfield Mortimer, Berkshire, England
- Died: 12 March 1937 (aged 93); Christchurch, New Zealand
- Occupation: Lawyer
- Father: Henry Harper
- Relatives: Henry Harper (brother); Leonard Harper (brother); Emily Acland (sister); Eric Harper (son); Arthur Paul Harper (nephew); Hugh Acland (nephew)

Sir George Harper OBE (24 April 1843 – 12 March 1937) was an English-born New Zealand lawyer. From a large family, he was a son of the inaugural bishop of Christchurch, Henry Harper, and he arrived in Christchurch in 1858 at age 15, two years after his father. He completed his education in Christchurch and farmed for a few years before commencing law. Embroiled in an embezzlement case by his brother Leonard, he was bankrupted and removed from the bar for five years. After readmission, he set up his own practice. Like his parents, he had a large family; three of his boys were killed in World War I. Harper was involved in a number of community initiatives, clubs and societies, and was knighted shortly before his death. He died aged 93 and had outlived his wife and most of his children.

== Early life ==
Harper was born at Stratfield Mortimer in Berkshire, England. His father was Henry Harper. One of fifteen children, he was the fourth son. Emily (1830–1905) was his eldest sister, and Henry (1833–1922) and Leonard (1837–1915) were elder brothers. He received his education at Radley College and then Eton College. His parents, four brothers and a sister went to New Zealand in 1856 for his father to take up his role as the inaugural bishop of Christchurch. He followed them two years later, arriving on the Regina on 15 November 1858; William Rolleston was another cabin passenger. In Christchurch, he completed his education at Christ's College (1859–1862). He was a Rowley scholar in 1860 and elected senior Somes scholar in 1861.

After Christ's College, Harper spent four years on sheep stations. Together with his eldest brother Henry, they leased the Malvern Hills station from their father for an annual rent of NZ£700. He was the manager of Avoca farm, owned by his elder brother Charles (1838–1920). When the West Coast gold rush started in 1864, there were strenuous efforts made to find a better route between Christchurch and the West Coast than the traditional route over what became known as Harper Pass (named after his brother Leonard). George Harper drove 500 sheep over Browning Pass / Nōti Raureka and the Styx Saddle to Hokitika that year, but at over 1,400 metres (4,600 ft) height, Browning Pass was not suited.

In 1866, Harper returned to England to study law in London. He received admittance to the Inner Temple in 1869. He went on the Northern Circuit and then returned to New Zealand in 1870.

== Legal career in New Zealand ==
Harper joined Hanmer and Harper, a legal firm owned by his brother, Leonard, and Philip Hanmer, as a clerk in 1870. Hanmer died in November 1878, and his executors dissolved the partnership in May 1879. George Harper took Hanmer's place for a substantial payment to the executors, with the legal practice then continuing to operate as Harper and Harper. Later that year, Henry Alan Scott joined them as a partner and the firm was then known as Harper, Harper, and Scott. When Thomas William Maude joined as a partner in January 1881, the firm became Harper and Co.

George Harper managed the legal part of the business, his brother looked after the finances, and Maude was in charge of conveyancing. During the 1880s, Harper was a member of the commission that revised the Supreme Court Acts and overhauled the procedures for the court. George Harper's specialised in local body law.

Leonard Harper left New Zealand for England on 25 July 1891; officially this was a business trip on behalf of the New Zealand Shipping Company. Over the next two years, it emerged that his law firm was bankrupt, and that NZ£200,000 had been embezzled by him. George Harper was declared bankrupt in March 1893. George Harper and Maude both had their names removed from the roll of the bar by the Court of Appeal in 1894. Within a few days, Harper had applied to join George Harris as a clerk, which was opposed by the Law Society on the grounds that Harris had only recently qualified and Harper would in fact be the senior partner; the objection was not upheld when the case went to court and Harper started with Harris. In May 1899, both Maude and Harper were readmitted to the bar.

Harper formed his own practice after his readmission. In January 1905, he had his son Eric and Guy Dobrée Pascoe (father of Paul and John Pascoe) join him as partners, with the firm then known as George Harper, Son and Pascoe. His son was killed in WWI in 1918. In May 1919, G. H. Buchanan joined his Ashburton legal practice with the firm and it was from then known as George Harper, Pascoe and Buchanan. In January 1924, John Hazlitt Upham (the father of Charles Upham) joined the firm as a partner, and the firm's name changed to Harper, Pascoe, Buchanan, and Upham. The firm's name was still the same in the early 1940s, long after his death.

== Community involvement ==
Harper was a member of many organisations. In 1910 and 1911, he was president of the Canterbury Law Society. At the same time, he was president of the Christchurch Club. During WWI, he founded the Citizens' Defence Corps; the organisation recruited 3,000 men and was looking after the interests of soldiers. Harper was a member of the Christchurch Domains Board and was its chairman from 1920 to 1931. At the first dinner held by the Christ's College Old Boy Association in July 1884, Harper presided. He was a governor of Christ's College. He was a trustee of the McLean's Institute.

When a war memorial was under discussion for Christchurch, Harper wrote a history of Cathedral Square in 1922, which was the basis for Christchurch City Council not granting the use of the site for the proposal.

== Honours and awards ==
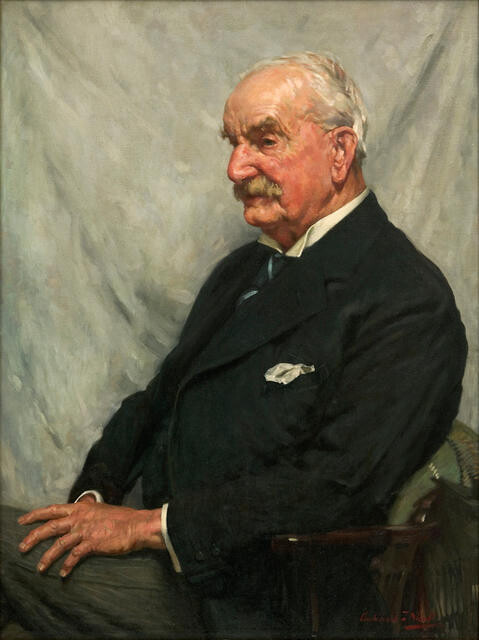
Portrait of Harper painted by Archibald Nicoll in 1932

For services in connection with the Citizens' Defence Corps, Harper was appointed Officer of the Order of the British Empire (OBE) in 1918. In the 1937 New Year Honours, less than six weeks before his death, he was made a Knight Bachelor.

== Family and death ==
On 21 November 1871, Harper married Agnes Loughnan at Christchurch, the daughter of Robert John Loughnan. His father-in-law used to be a judge with the East India Company before coming to New Zealand in 1868. The Harpers lived in Papanui on Harewood Road opposite the Papanui railway station; the site was later the Sanitarium Health Food factory and, after demolition after the 2011 Christchurch earthquake, is now the site of Mitre 10 MEGA store.

The Harpers had two girls and eight boys. Two of their children died as infants: a boy in September 1881 aged 16 days, and a girl aged 14 months in July 1890. Three of their boys died in World War One: Gordon (1885–1916), Edmond (1874–1917), and Eric (1877–1918). Gordon Harper had been nominated by the Reform Party in the Riccarton electorate for the 1914 general election but he withdrew due to the upcoming war service. The next to die was their son Cuthbert (1879–1921), who had a chest weakness from the Second Boer War and died from pneumonia; he had until some months before his death been a member of Christchurch City Council.

Harper's wife Agnes died in March 1931. Their son Philip (1883–1933), since 1929 resident in Gisborne, died in Christchurch after an operation. Harper died six years after his wife on 12 March 1937, aged 93. At the time of his death, their daughter and two sons were still alive.

Their eldest son George Herbert (1872–1943) died in Wellington. Their daughter Lilian (1876–1948) died in Hawarden. Their youngest son, Robert Paul known as Robin (1887–1972), died in Woodbury.

== Legacy and memorials ==
Harper Avenue, an arterial route in the northwest of Christchurch's central city, is named for Harper.
