= Leonard Harper (politician) =

New Zealand politician

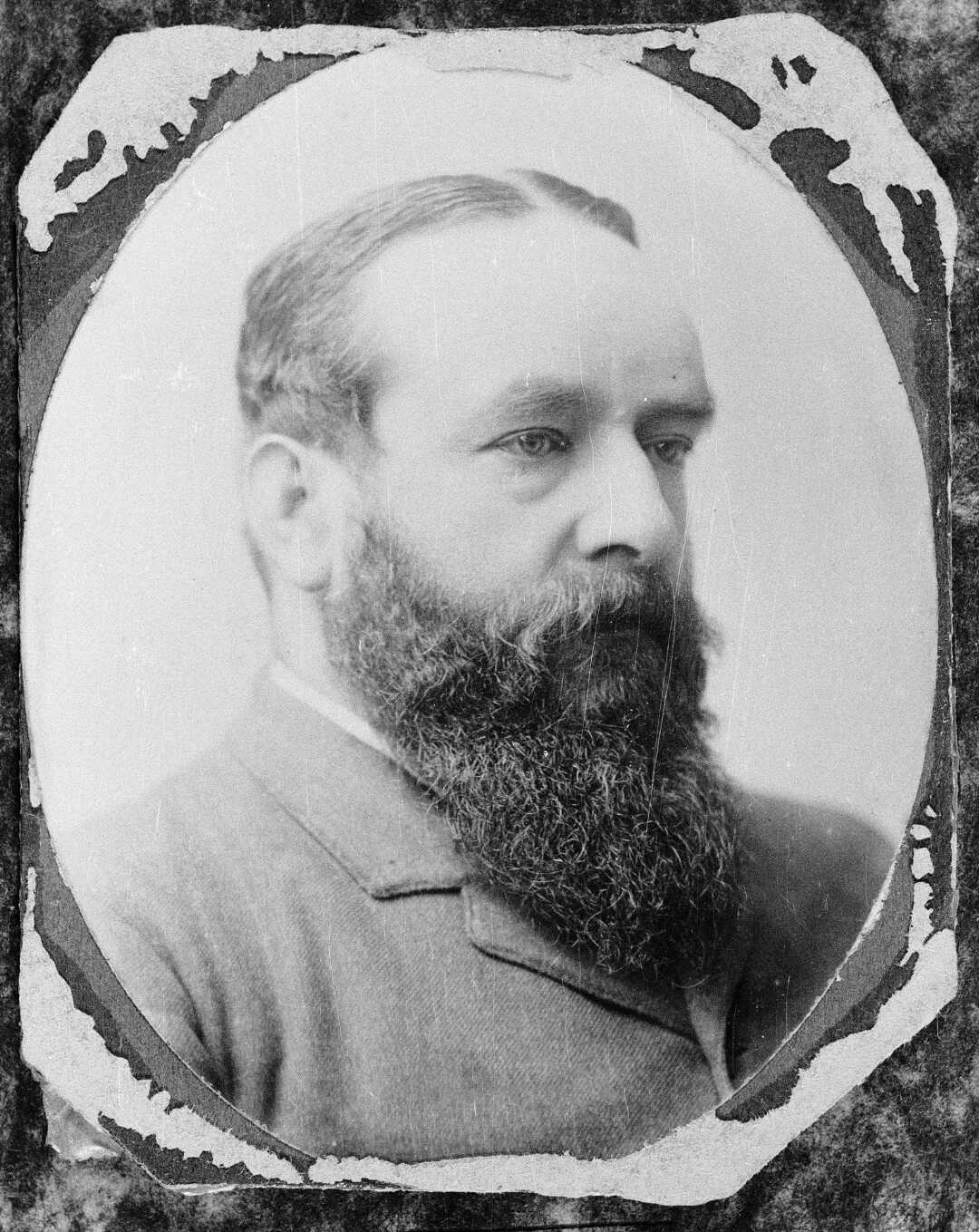
- Harper, ca. 1890s

Member of the New Zealand Parliament for Cheviot
- In office 8 January 1876 – 2 April 1878

Member of the New Zealand Parliament for Avon
- In office 22 July 1884 – 3 May 1887

Personal details
- Born: 2 June 1837 Berkshire, England
- Died: 27 October 1915 (aged 78) Somerset, England
- Children: Arthur Paul Harper (son)
- Relatives: Henry Harper (father); Emily Acland (sister)

Leonard Harper (2 June 1837 – 27 October 1915) was a 19th-century Member of Parliament in Canterbury, New Zealand.

== Early life ==
Harper was born in 1837, either in Eton or Stratfield Mortimer in Berkshire, England. His father was Henry Harper, who became the first bishop of Christchurch. Leonard Harper and his brother Charles (1838–1920) came to New Zealand with Bishop George Selwyn, who returned from a visit to England on the Sir George Seymour, landing in Auckland on 5 July 1855.

In 1856 Henry Harper was appointed to the episcopate as Bishop of Christchurch. Harper and his family arrived on 23 December 1856 in Lyttelton on the Egmont.

=== Harper Pass ===
In 1857, his father heard from Tainui, a Ngāi Tahu leader from Kaiapoi, that some Māori wanted to travel to the west coast of the South Island via their traditional route along the Hurunui and Taramakau rivers. Tainui agreed that his son and two other Māori would lead Leonard Harper and Mr. Locke over the pass.

On 4 November 1857, Harper set off from Mr. Mason's station on the Waitohi River to cross the pass; the party included Locke and four Māori from Kaiapoi. Once they reached the Taramakau, they encountered flooding and built a raft from flax stalks. They reached the West Coast 23 days after setting off, and took 14 days for the return journey to Mason's farm. Before they returned, they travelled along the coast as far south as the Waitangitāhuna River. The party returned to Christchurch in January 1858.

Edward Dobson had been over the pass only weeks before Harper, but Dobson was stopped by bad weather from completing his journey. Harper descended to the coast and was thus the first European to cross the Southern Alps from east coast to west coast. The pass has since been known as Harper Pass.

== Political career ==
New Zealand Parliament
Years	Term	Electorate	Party
1876–1878	6th	Cheviot	Independent
1884–1887	9th	Avon	Independent

He represented the Cheviot electorate in the New Zealand House of Representatives from 1876 to 1878, when he resigned. He then represented the Avon electorate from 1884 to 1887, when he again resigned.

He bought Ilam homestead, once the largest residential building in Christchurch, and was for some years co-owner of Risingholme, which was bought from the estate of William Reeves.

== Professional career ==
In May 1857, Harper was elected clerk of the Canterbury Provincial Council.

In 1865, he joined the legal firm of Travers and Hanmer, run by William Travers and Philip Hanmer. His brother, George Harper, joined them in 1870 as a clerk. Hanmer died in November 1878, and his executors dissolved the partnership in May 1879. George Harper took Hanmer's place for a substantial payment to the executors, with the legal practice then continuing to operate as Harper and Harper.

Leonard Harper left New Zealand on 25 July 1891; officially this was a business trip on behalf of the New Zealand Shipping Company. Three days later, he was voted in absentia the inaugural chair of the New Zealand Alpine Club. Over the next two years, it emerged that his law firm was bankrupt, and that NZ£200,000 had been embezzled by him.

== Family and death ==
He later lived on Jersey in the Channel Islands. Harper settled at Bruton, Somerset, in 1906.

In 1864 at Huntsham, Devon, he married Joanna Dorothea Dyke Troyte. Arthur Paul Harper and John Ernest Harper were their sons.

Emily Acland was his eldest sister (1830–1905). She married the farmer and politician John Acland in 1860. The politician and farmer Charles Blakiston married his second sister, Mary Anna Harper (1832–1924). The priest Henry Harper (1833–1922) was his eldest brother. Ellen Shephard Harper (1834–1916) was his third sister; she married the farmer Charles George Tripp.

== Notes ==
New Zealand Parliament
Preceded by Henry Ingles	Member of Parliament for Cheviot; 1876–1878	Succeeded by Alfred Saunders
Preceded by William Rolleston	Member of Parliament for Avon; 1884–1887	Succeeded by Edwin Blake
