= Peel Forest =

- Rural community
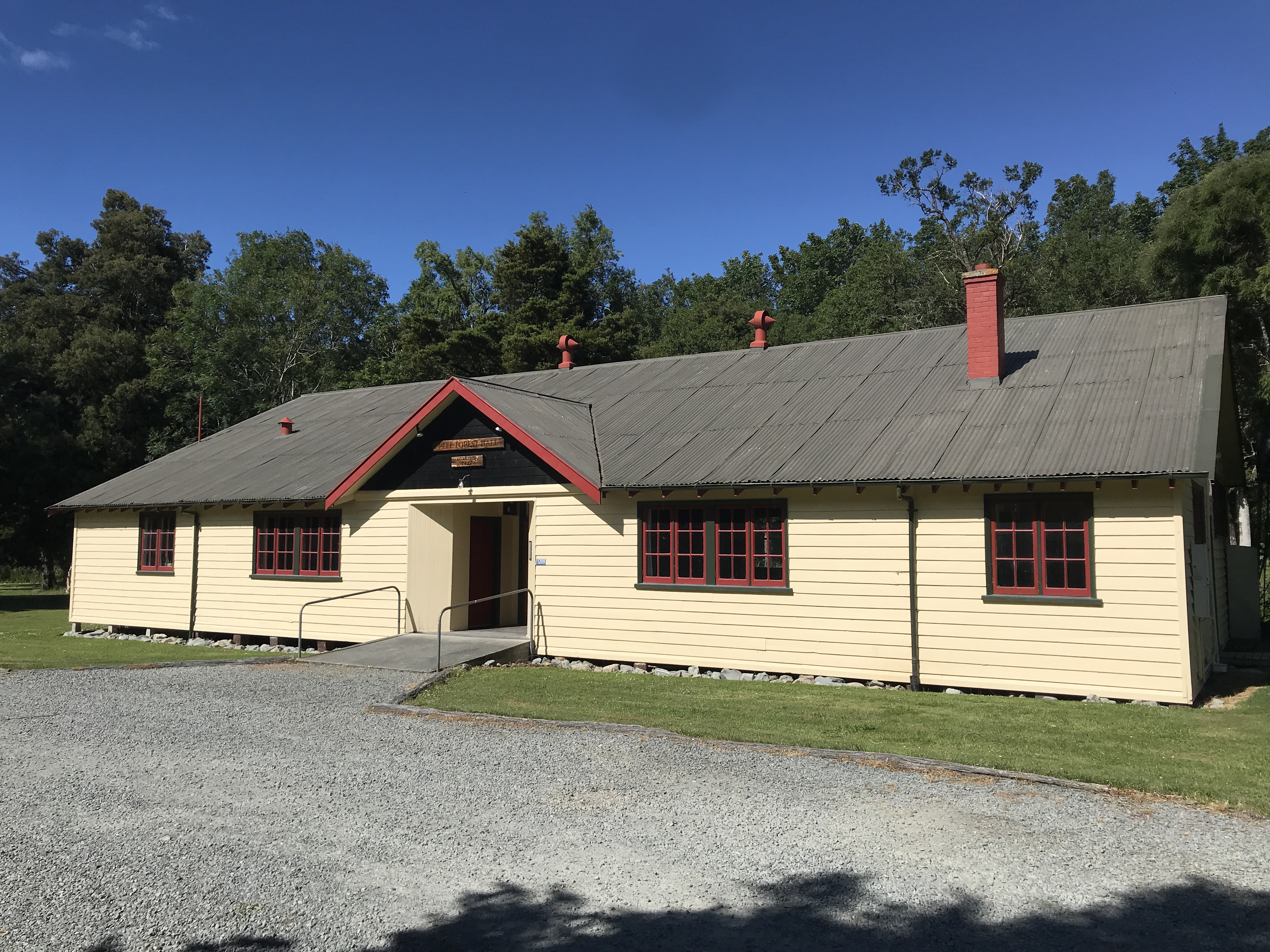
- Peel Forest community hall
- Interactive map of Peel Forest
- Coordinates: 43°55′S 171°16′E
- Country: New Zealand
- Region: Canterbury
- Territorial authority: Timaru District
- Ward: Geraldine
- Community: Geraldine
- Electorates: Waitaki; Te Tai Tonga (Māori)

Government
  - Territorial authority: Timaru District Council
  - Regional council: Environment Canterbury
  - Mayor of Timaru: Nigel Bowen
  - Waitaki MP: Miles Anderson
  - Te Tai Tonga MP: Tākuta Ferris

Peel Forest is a small community in the Canterbury region of New Zealand. It is located near the Peel Forest Park Scenic Reserve and about 23 kilometres (14 mi) north of Geraldine. The town features a cafe, bar, camping ground, and an outdoor recreation facility. Popular activities include camping and tramping in the area, rafting and kayaking on the nearby Rangitata and Orari rivers and four-wheel-drive tours to nearby Lord of the Rings film locations.

== History ==
According to Māori culture the large tōtara trees located in the forest are the tamariki (children) of Tarahaoa and Huatekerekere whom themselves turned into Mount Peel and Little Mount Peel upon their deaths. They were both part of Ārai Te Uru's ill-fated trading trip along the Canterbury coast.

The first European to visit the region was Charles Torlesse in 1849 in the search for coal. Torlesse named the area "Gurdon Forrest" this was later renamed in the memory of Sir Robert Peel by Francis Jollie. The community took off in the 1850s with the rise of the timber industry. Kahikatea, mataī, and tōtara were all milled in the region and the remains of the sawpits can still be found at Clarke Flat today. Saw milling continued in the region till after the 1900s. A horrified Arthur Mills who was visiting in 1881, was so taken back by the devastation that he personally purchased 16 hectares of untouched forest. This would go on to form the beginnings of the Peel Forest Park.

The other source of commerce in the early days was farming. Early runs were set up John B A Acland, Charles G Tripp and Francis Jollie. Acland and Tripp, who in the late 1850s with all of the land on the plains taken, decided to chance their luck further up the foothills. At its largest the partnership held nearly 300,00 acres of land including Mount Peel, Mount Somers, Mount Possession, Orari Gorge and parts of Mesopotamia and Hakatere.

== Demographics ==
Peel Forest is part of the Ben McLeod statistical area, which covers 842.34 km^{2} (325.23 sq mi) and had an estimated population of 160 as of June 2025, with a population density of 0.19 people per km^{2}.

Historical population
Year	Pop.	±% p.a.
2006	111	—
2013	162	+5.55%
2018	132	−4.01%
2023	138	+0.89%

Ben McLeod had a population of 138 in the 2023 New Zealand census, an increase of 6 people (4.5%) since the 2018 census, and a decrease of 24 people (−14.8%) since the 2013 census. There were 75 males and 63 females in 69 dwellings. 4.3% of people identified as LGBTIQ+. The median age was 38.7 years (compared with 38.1 years nationally). There were 21 people (15.2%) aged under 15 years, 30 (21.7%) aged 15 to 29, 63 (45.7%) aged 30 to 64, and 24 (17.4%) aged 65 or older.

People could identify as more than one ethnicity. The results were 95.7% European (Pākehā); 4.3% Māori; 2.2% Middle Eastern, Latin American and African New Zealanders (MELAA); and 4.3% other, which includes people giving their ethnicity as "New Zealander". English was spoken by 97.8%, Māori by 2.2%, and other languages by 6.5%. No language could be spoken by 2.2% (e.g. too young to talk). The percentage of people born overseas was 19.6, compared with 28.8% nationally.

Religious affiliations were 23.9% Christian, 2.2% Buddhist, and 2.2% New Age. People who answered that they had no religion were 58.7%, and 15.2% of people did not answer the census question.

Of those at least 15 years old, 27 (23.1%) people had a bachelor's or higher degree, 66 (56.4%) had a post-high school certificate or diploma, and 24 (20.5%) people exclusively held high school qualifications. The median income was $37,000, compared with $41,500 nationally. 9 people (7.7%) earned over $100,000 compared to 12.1% nationally. The employment status of those at least 15 was 72 (61.5%) full-time and 18 (15.4%) part-time.

== Education ==
Early schools in the region were set up in nearby Scotsburn with the school being moved to Peel Forest in 1923. The school was closed in 1998 and students transferred to Carew Peel Forest School. The school buildings are currently used as a Montessori pre-school.

== Buildings ==
=== St Stephen's Church ===
Located on the main street the first church was built in 1868. A whirlwind destroyed the original in 1884 with the current church being built in 1885. The church is well known for its wooden interior and unique New Zealand twist to its traditional stained glass windows.

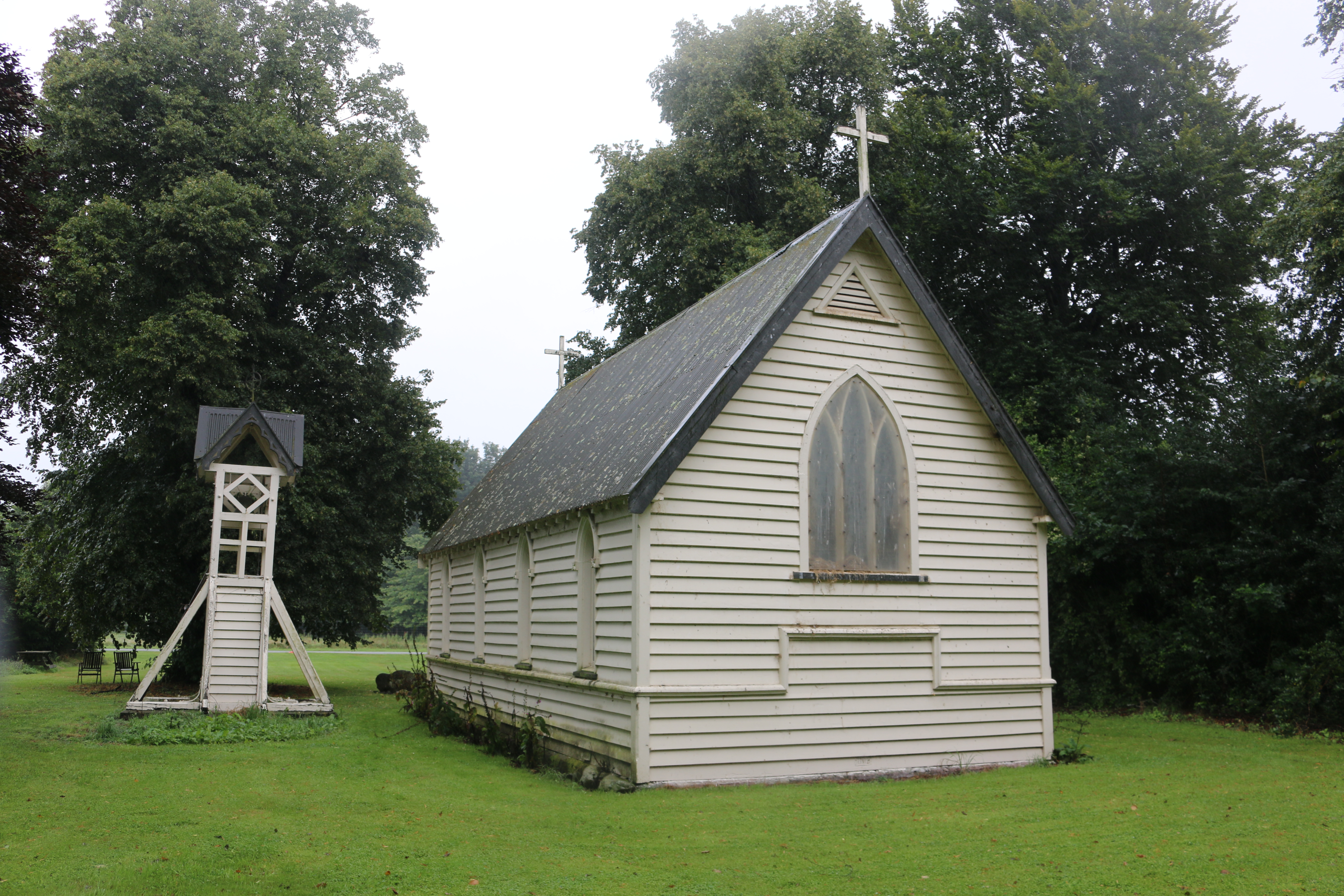
St Stephen's Church, Peel Forest

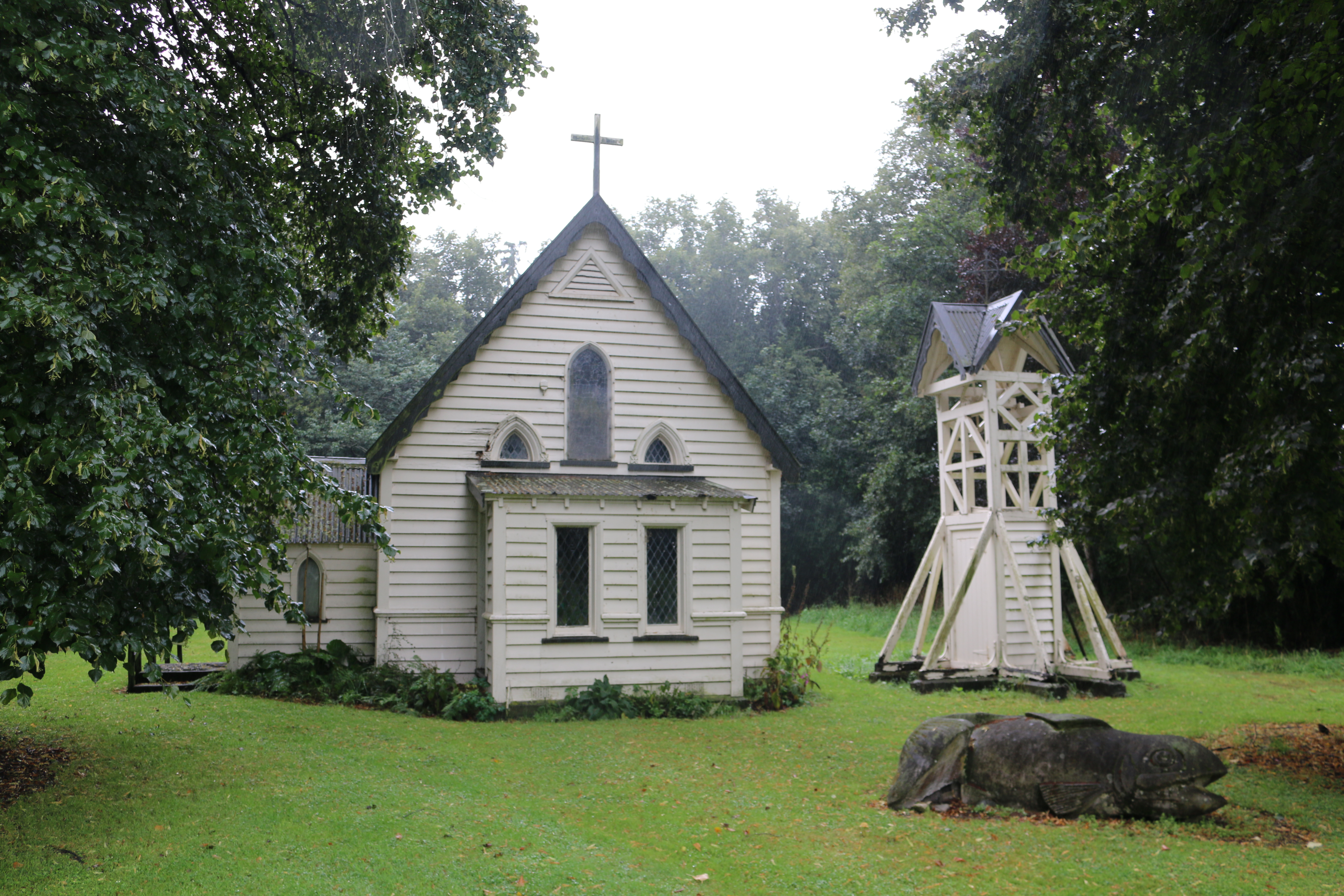
St Stephen's Church, Peel Forest

== Notable people ==
- John B A Acland (25 November 1823 – 18 May 1904), politician and early run holder.
- Austen Deans (2 December 1915 – 18 October 2011), noted New Zealand based artist who, with his wife and seven sons, lived and worked in Peel Forest. Deans is known for his traditional landscape paintings depicting the Canterbury high country
- Captain George Hamilton Dennistoun (23 September 1884 – 1977), DSO, OBE. Born in Peel Forest. Held various command positions throughout World War I and II.
- Jim Dennistoun (7 March 1883 – 9 August 1916), Born in Peel Forest. First successful ascent of Mt D’Archiac. Was part of the ill-fated Terra Nova Expedition with Robert Scott. Awarded the King's Antarctic Medal and the medal of the Royal Geographical Society. Died in World War I in Austria as a POW, Dennistoun Glacier in Antarctica was named after him.
- Francis Jollie (1815 – 30 November 1870), Member of Parliament (1861–1870)
- Dame Ngaio Marsh (23 April 1895 – 18 February 1982), famous crime writer. Buried at the Church of the Holy Innocents.
- Charles G Tripp (1 July 1826 – 6 July 1897), early run holder.

== Climate ==
Climate data for Peel Forest (1991–2020)
Month	Jan	Feb	Mar	Apr	May	Jun	Jul	Aug	Sep	Oct	Nov	Dec	Year
Mean daily maximum °C (°F)	21.8 (71.2)	21.5 (70.7)	19.6 (67.3)	16.7 (62.1)	14.2 (57.6)	11.3 (52.3)	10.9 (51.6)	12.2 (54.0)	14.7 (58.5)	16.5 (61.7)	18.0 (64.4)	20.1 (68.2)	16.5 (61.6)
Daily mean °C (°F)	15.5 (59.9)	15.3 (59.5)	13.4 (56.1)	10.7 (51.3)	8.2 (46.8)	5.5 (41.9)	5.0 (41.0)	6.4 (43.5)	8.5 (47.3)	10.2 (50.4)	11.9 (53.4)	14.1 (57.4)	10.4 (50.7)
Mean daily minimum °C (°F)	9.2 (48.6)	9.0 (48.2)	7.2 (45.0)	4.7 (40.5)	2.3 (36.1)	−0.3 (31.5)	−0.9 (30.4)	0.6 (33.1)	2.4 (36.3)	3.9 (39.0)	5.7 (42.3)	8.0 (46.4)	4.3 (39.8)
Average rainfall mm (inches)	104.5 (4.11)	100.6 (3.96)	99.7 (3.93)	97.3 (3.83)	76.0 (2.99)	70.3 (2.77)	74.8 (2.94)	72.3 (2.85)	76.8 (3.02)	102.1 (4.02)	100.6 (3.96)	117.9 (4.64)	1,092.9 (43.02)
Source: CliFlo
