= Walter Empson =

Walter Empson

Walter Empson (19 February 1856 – 14 June 1934) was a New Zealand teacher, headmaster and educationalist.

== Early life and family ==
Empson was born in Eydon, Northamptonshire, England, on 19 February 1856. He was the eldest of the eight children of Anna Delicia Hook and her husband, Arthur John Empson, an Anglican clergyman.

== Education and career ==
Empson was educated at Charterhouse before entering Trinity College, Oxford, where he gained a second-class honours degree, graduating in 1880. Weak eyesight had forced him to abandon his earlier intention of entering the army, and with no particular career in mind he sailed for New Zealand, probably in 1879. After a brief period with a survey party at Patea he worked on sheep stations in Canterbury, including his brother Arthur's farm on Rangitata Island.

Finding this life tedious Empson tried banana growing in Fiji. On his return to Christchurch two years later, having lost his capital and contracted Malaria, he became secretary to the Canterbury Jockey Club. Then in 1884 he joined the staff of Wanganui Collegiate School under the Reverend B. W. Harvey. Aided by a natural flair for dealing with boys and a quick intelligence, he rapidly became an outstanding teacher. A notable feature of his teaching style both in and out of the classroom was his use of the dramatic: for example, a bust of Julius Caesar which adorned his classroom was paraded around the school on the ides of March.

In 1888, after only four years' teaching, Walter Empson was offered the headmastership of Wanganui Collegiate School following the death of Harvey. Empson's 21-year headmastership coincided with a considerable growth of independent schools in New Zealand and the transformation of many into state schools, particularly after 1902–3. Inheriting a securely established school, he was able to concentrate his energies on its development and wrought far-reaching and revolutionary changes. Growth of character rather than mere book learning was his objective. Known to his students simply as 'The Man', he combined a spirit of camaraderie with strict discipline (corporal punishment was meted out with a fives bat for maximum sound and moral effect). He was a firm believer in allowing the boys to govern themselves as much as possible and entrusted to them many branches of school activity: he developed the prefectorial system, appointed senior boys instead of masters as officers in the cadet corps, and handed over the production of the school magazine to the students. Sport became an organised element of the curriculum, for Empson saw it as an important medium for the development of loyalty, physical potential and personal and team skills. Another innovation, adopted from Loretto School in Scotland, was the introduction of shorts and open-necked flannel shirts as the school uniform. Although initially frowned on, this set a fashion which eventually spread beyond Wanganui Collegiate to become almost universal in New Zealand secondary schools. A wiry man with straw-coloured hair, Empson had become well known in Christchurch in his early years as he went about wearing riding breeches, a loud checked coat and a monocle, with a bulldog always at his heels. Later the monocle was replaced by spectacles and the checked coat by an ill-fitting and worn suit, but he hardly portrayed the conventional image of a schoolmaster.

== Marriage and children ==
On his return from Fiji Empson had also renewed his acquaintance with Agnes Dyke Acland (daughter of John and Emily Acland), who had earlier refused his proposal of marriage. On 15 September 1885 the couple were married at the Church of the Holy Innocents at her father's station, Mount Peel. They were to have a daughter and a son.

== Retirement ==
In 1903 a charge of immorality was brought against Empson by a school parent. He was exonerated by a judicial inquiry, but the incident precipitated a breakdown of his health. Former students subscribed several hundred pounds to enable Empson, his wife and daughter to take an overseas holiday at the end of that year. Subsequently he was troubled by recurring ill health, which hastened his retirement in 1909.

After visiting their son in India and Walter's brother in Mexico, the Empsons returned to England about 1914–15 to live in quiet retirement. During the First World War they helped care for New Zealand soldiers, work for which Agnes Empson was made an OBE. After the war Walter Empson devoted much of his leisure time to making Braille books for the blind.

== Death ==
Empson died on 14 June 1934 at Parkstone, in Poole, Dorset. Agnes Empson returned to New Zealand, where she died at Havelock North on 3 April 1945.
