= William Brassington =

New Zealand stonemason and sculptor

William Brassington (1837 or 1841 – 3 March 1905) was a stonemason, sculptor and builder practising in Christchurch, New Zealand in the late 19th century. His sculptured carving on many of the city's unique Gothic Revival public buildings is regarded as some of the finest in the Southern Hemisphere. His work is celebrated around New Zealand and he died when he was around 65

== Biography ==
Brassington was born in Nottingham, England, and trained, like his father, to be a stonemason. In 1863 he and his wife Ellen and two daughters emigrated to New Zealand aboard the ship Brother's Pride. His youngest child died on the voyage. On arrival in New Zealand he set up business in a Christchurch cemetery as a monumental mason. The quality of his work was noticed by the official Provincial Architect Benjamin Mountfort who was working on the provincial council chamber in Christchurch. Mountfort immediately employed Brassington to carve the decorated stonework. The work Brassington executed at the council chamber is considered to be his best. He decorated the corbels, capitals and arches with carvings of flora and fauna indigenous to the province of Canterbury. In addition was statuary depicting Queen Victoria, her consort and other great statesmen and popular heroes of the day. It was also rumoured that depicted amongst the great and the good was Brassington's favourite barmaid and an image of himself.

Brassington's work at the council chamber established him as a sought after craftsman in the rapidly developing city of Christchurch; he carved the pulpit at the church of St. John the Baptist in Latimer Square on 1866, and the font at Flaxton Church on 1867. He was commissioned to work on Christchurch Cathedral. However, when the project ran out of funds and came to a temporary halt, Brassington turned to building as a source of income, and worked on Lyttelton Harbour and many other projects at Teddington and Allendale.

One of his buildings was the Church of the Holy Innocents at Mount Peel, which was completed in 1869. The acclaim with which this building was greeted led him to be chosen to work again with Mountfort completing the last stage of the Canterbury Museum in the 1870s, and again at the museum to build the great portico in 1876.

Brassington's partnership with John Kennington won the duo the prestigious commission of building the castle-like Lyttelton Timeball Station, built of volcanic red stone, and which was completed in 1876. Following this construction he was again employed by Mountfort on the restarted Christchurch cathedral, although here his work is not documented.

In 1889 Brassington emigrated again, this time to Melbourne, Australia, where he seems to have abandoned his masonry career in favour of the Warrandyte goldfield. He died of an oral tumour in 1905 and was buried at Footscray cemetery, Australia.
