= Henry Harper (bishop) =

New Zealand Anglican (1804–1893)

The Most Reverend Henry Harper
- Primate of New Zealand
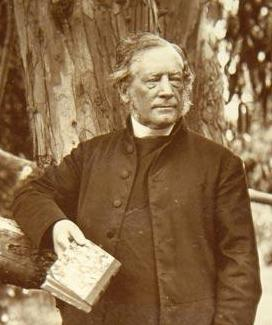
- Bishop Harper in 1869
- Church: Church of England
- Province: New Zealand
- In office: 1869–1890
- Predecessor: George Selwyn (as Metropolitan)
- Successor: Octavius Hadfield
- Other post: Bishop of Christchurch (1856–1890)

Orders
- Ordination: 1832

Personal details
- Born: c. 1804 Gosport, Hampshire, England
- Died: 28 December 1893 (aged 89) Christchurch, New Zealand
- Education: The Queen's College, Oxford
- Relatives: Henry Harper (son); George Harper (son); Leonard Harper (son); Emily Acland (daughter); John Acland (son-in-law); Charles Blakiston (son-in-law); Charles Tripp (son-in-law); Arthur Paul Harper (grandson); Eric Harper (grandson); Hugh Acland (grandson); Jack Acland (great-grandson)

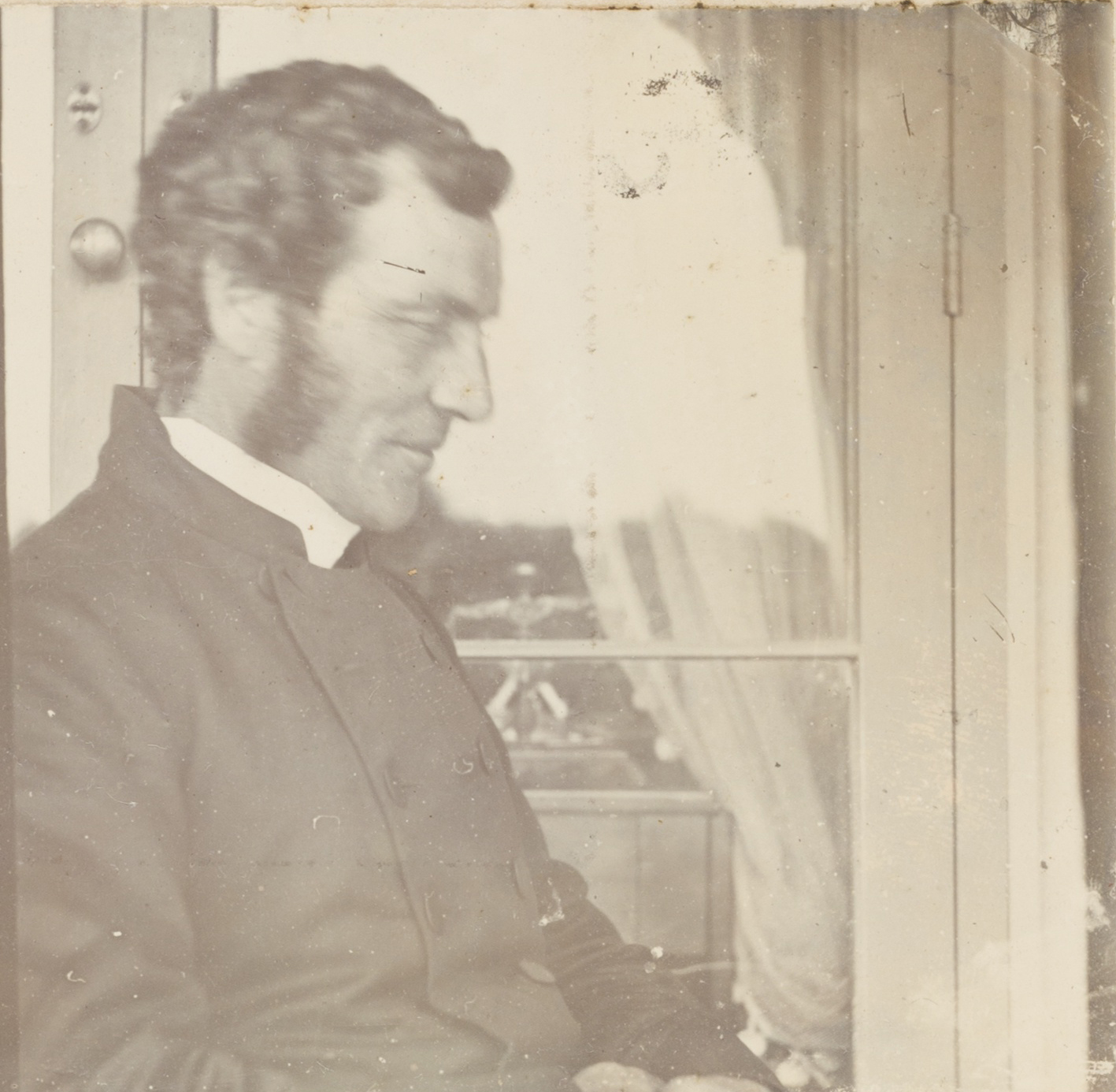
Harper, c. 1860

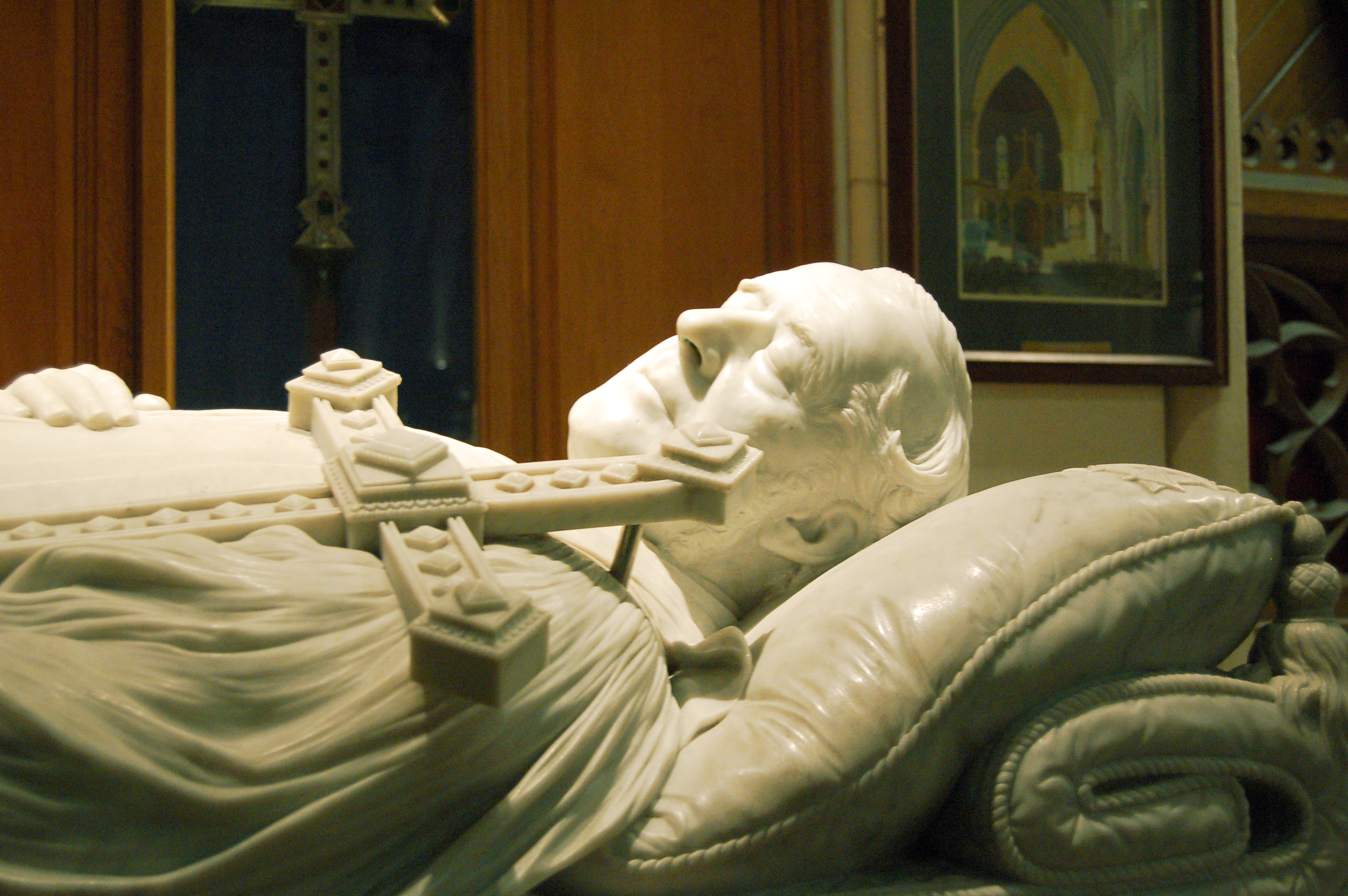
Harper's memorial in ChristChurch Cathedral

Henry John Chitty Harper (c. 1804 – 28 December 1893) was an Anglican bishop in the second half of the 19th century.

== Life ==
Henry John Chitty Harper was born in c. 1804 in Gosport, Hampshire, England, to Tristram Harper and Mary Jellicoe Harper. Tristram Harper (father of Henry John Chitty Harper) was the great-grandson of John Strachey. Harper was baptised on 9 January 1804, educated at The Queen's College, Oxford and ordained in 1832. He was Chaplain of Eton College until December 1840 then Vicar of St Mary's, Stratfield Mortimer. In 1856 he was appointed to the episcopate as Bishop of Christchurch. Harper and his family arrived on 23 December 1856 in Lyttelton on the Egmont. At the 4th General Synod, 14 October 1868, he was elected and upon receiving in July 1869 notice of Selwyn's resignation, he became Primate of New Zealand; he resigned the Primacy on 5 September 1889 and his See on 31 March 1890, in ill-health. He died on 28 December 1893 and is buried at Barbadoes Street Cemetery.

=== Family ===
On 12 December 1829 at St Maurice, Winchester, Harper married Emily Wooldridge. They had 15 children. His eldest daughter, Emily Weddell Harper married the politician John Acland. Two of his other daughters married Charles Blakiston, son of Matthew Blakiston; and Charles George Tripp, a pioneering sheep farmer in New Zealand. A son, Leonard Harper, became a member of parliament, and Arthur Paul Harper was his grandson. Another son, Charles John Harper, owned various large farms and unsuccessfully stood for election to the House of Representatives in the Ashburton electorate in 1899.

Anglican Communion titles
New diocese	Bishop of Christchurch; 1856–1890	Succeeded by Churchill Julius
Preceded by George Selwyn as Metropolitan	Primate of New Zealand; 1869–1889	Succeeded by Octavius Hadfield
