= Austen Deans =

New Zealand painter

Austen Deans OBE
- Born: Alister Austen Deans; 2 December 1915; Christchurch, New Zealand
- Died: 18 October 2011 (aged 95); Christchurch, New Zealand
- Known for: War art Watercolour landscapes
- Relatives: Harry Knight (grandfather); John Deans (great-grandfather); Jane Deans (great-grandmother); Julia Deans (granddaughter)

Alister Austen Deans OBE (2 December 1915 – 18 October 2011) was a New Zealand painter, known for his landscapes and for his work as a war artist in the Second World War.

Born in Christchurch to a well-known farming family, Deans became interested in art in his teenage years. He studied fine arts at the Canterbury College School of Art before returning to the family farm for work. He volunteered for the 2nd New Zealand Expeditionary Force on the outbreak of the Second World War, and was posted to the 20th Battalion. In 1941 he was appointed an assistant war artist, serving under Peter McIntyre. However, he was wounded during the Battle of Crete and became a prisoner of war (POW). Allowed to paint during his captivity, his work was a useful record of life as a POW. After the war, he studied painting at the Sir John Cass Technical Institute in England before settling down on a lifestyle block in Canterbury. He was a prolific painter of the Canterbury hill country. Made an Officer of the Order of the British Empire in 1995, he died in October 2011.

== Early life ==
Deans was born on 2 December 1915 in Christchurch, New Zealand, one of two sons of Alister and Norma Deans. His father, Alister, was a scion of the Deans family, notable in Christchurch for being one of the earliest European settlers in the region, and was later killed at the Battle of Passchendaele. His mother was the daughter of the farmer Harry Knight. Austen Deans's early years were spent on the family farm near Malvern before, when he was 10, his mother moved to the Riccarton suburb in Christchurch. He was educated at Medbury School and at Christ's College.

His interest in art developed when he was 12 years old, while on holidays at the family farm. He tramped into the hills taking painting and sketching materials with him. Family friends encouraged him in his art and when he finished his education, he decided to go to art school. Studying at the University of Canterbury towards a Bachelor of Arts concurrently with learning fine arts at the Canterbury College School of Art, he made the acquaintance of Bill Sutton. Despite being more interested in landscape work, he received much training in life drawing. Colin Lovell-Smith, Evelyn Page and Archibald Nicoll were influences.

Deans graduated in 1937 and returned to the family farm to work. This financed his tramping trips to the Southern Alps where he would make several sketches and watercolours of the hill country. He received favourable reviews of his work at exhibitions at the School of Art's Sketch Club and the Canterbury Arts Society. Dame Ngaio Marsh was an early supporter and soon he was making a number of sales of his work.

== Second World War ==
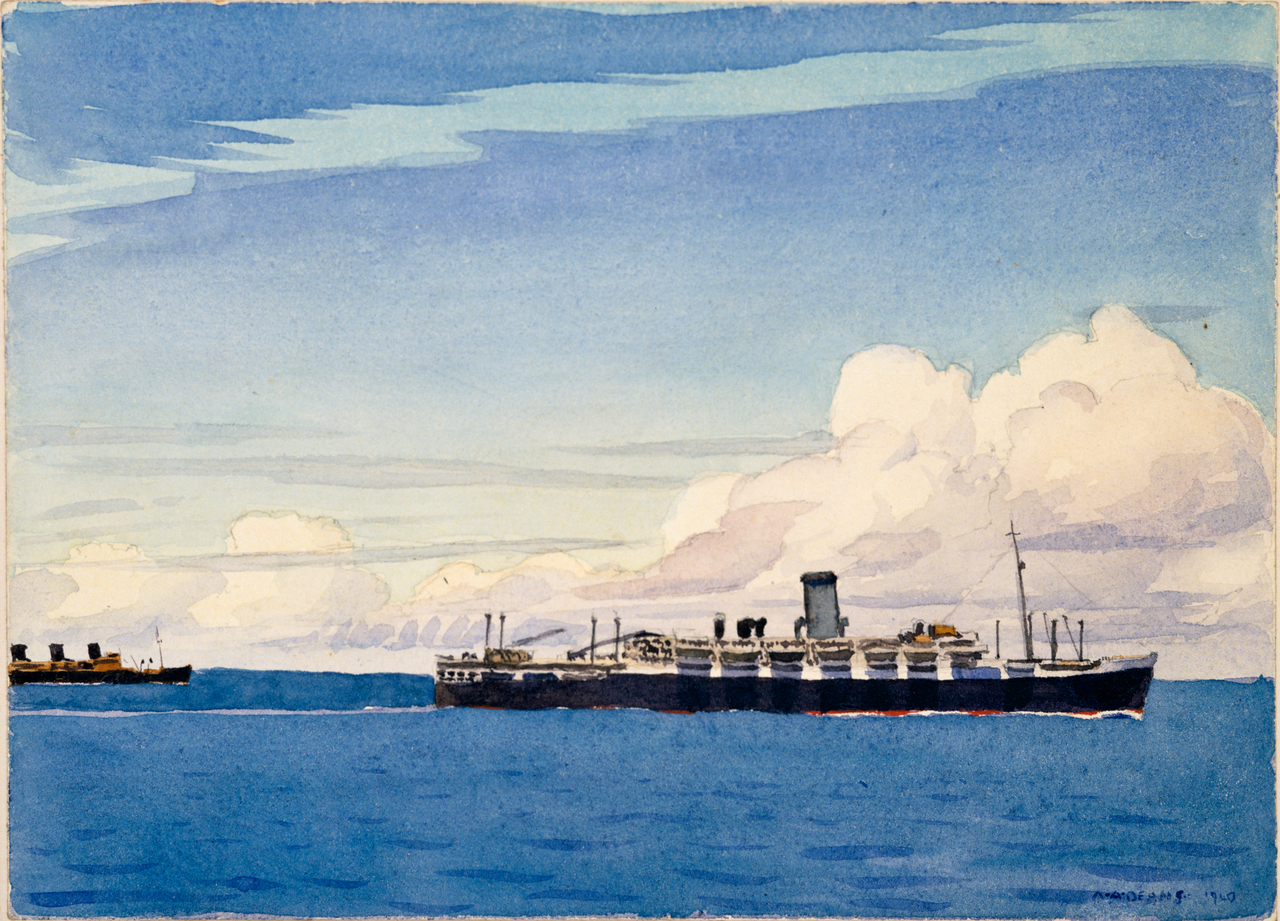
3 Days Out from New Zealand, 1940, a watercolour by Austen Deans of the troopship convoy transporting elements of the 2NZEF to the Middle East

The outbreak of the Second World War disrupted Deans's plans to study at the Slade School of Fine Art in London. Instead, he volunteered for war service abroad with the 2nd New Zealand Expeditionary Force (2NZEF). Posted to the 20th Battalion of the 2nd New Zealand Division, he was assigned to its intelligence section on account of his skills as an artist. His duties involved making and looking after maps but while off duty he continued to paint.

By 1940, Deans was in the Middle East, where the 2NZEF had been transported for war service. He continued with his painting, doing landscapes of the Egypt countryside. His battalion commander, Lieutenant Colonel Howard Kippenberger, was supportive of his work. Deans later completed a portrait of Kippenberger which was used to illustrate his biography. In March 1941, the 2nd New Zealand Division was sent to Greece. The British Government anticipated an invasion of Greece by the Germans and decided to send troops to support the Greeks, who were already engaged against the Italians in Albania. The 2nd New Zealand Division was one of a number of Allied units dispatched to Greece. The campaign was little more than a series of withdrawals but Deans still found time to make depictions of life in the Greek villages he saw. At the end of the fighting in Greece, Deans was among those evacuated to Crete.

In the meantime, the New Zealand Government was considering appointing an official war artist to record the exploits of New Zealanders serving with the military. Deans had already been interviewed for the position the previous year and his application was supported by many in New Zealand, particularly from the Canterbury region. His mother even wrote to the Prime Minister Peter Fraser advocating for her son. Deans had been interviewed by the commander of 2NZEF, Major General Bernard Freyberg, the previous year but the position would eventually go to Peter McIntyre. However, shortly after Deans's arrival on Crete, he was told that he had been appointed assistant war artist. His first task was to paint depictions of New Zealanders serving in Greece, as McIntyre had not been present for that campaign. Although he was offered the opportunity to return to Egypt to start his work there, he preferred to remain on Crete. He was therefore caught up in the invasion that commenced on 20 May 1941. Paintings already worked up by that stage were in transit to Egypt and would duly arrive in New Zealand. In the meantime, Deans was badly wounded; he had inadvertently set off a land mine and had to be hospitalised with his legs full of shrapnel. A few days later, and unable to be evacuated, he was one of 520 wounded New Zealanders to be captured by the Germans.

=== Prisoner of War ===
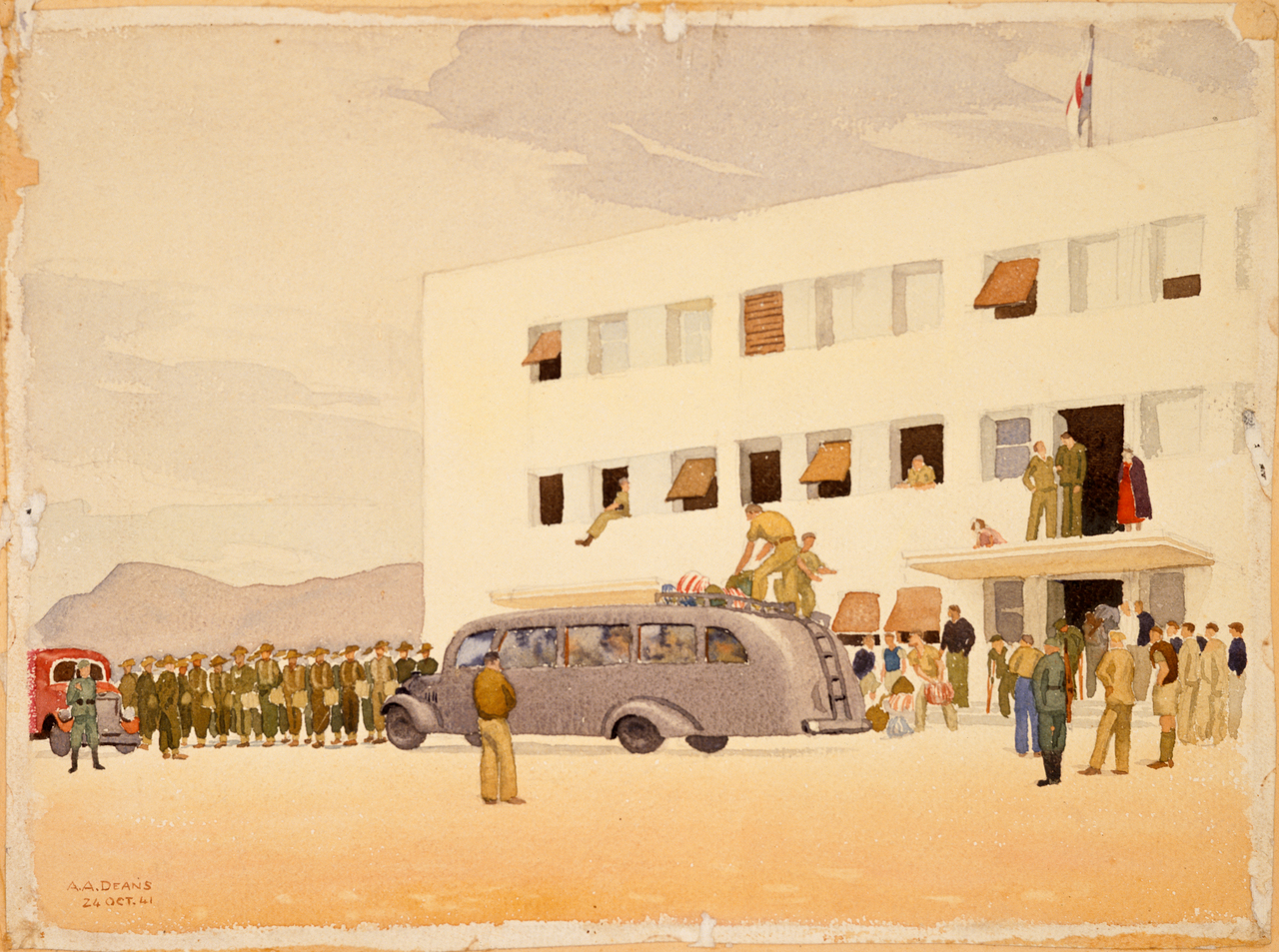
Severely wounded POWs loading up for repatriation, at Kokinia Hospital, Piraeus, 24 October 1941, by Austen Deans

Flown to Athens by his captors, Deans received medical treatment for several months at a hospital at Kokkinia, near Piraeus. While there, he was provided with pad and pencil by a fellow prisoner of war (POW) who wanted a portrait sketch to send to his family. This led onto further commissions from other POWs, as well as doctors and even guards. Paid a few pennies a time, he soon built up enough cash to organise, through a friendly Greek hospital worker, the purchase of painting supplies. He then set to work painting depictions of life at the hospital and surrounding landscapes which he would sell for money. While recuperating at Kokkinia, he met Australian modernist artists Justin O'Brien and Jesse Martin, both of whom were also POWs and who would influence Deans with their styles.

When he recovered from his wounds, Deans was transferred to a POW camp at Toruń, in occupied Poland. The trip there was arduous, travelling on cattle rail trucks, in a journey that took over two weeks. On arrival at the camp, Stalag XX-A, the POWs were put to work. Deans struggled initially, not accustomed to labouring after his prolonged period of medical treatment. He soon injured himself and consequently would be placed on light duties. As he had at Kokkinia, Deans soon found opportunities to express himself artistically at Stalag XX-A. Sourcing artist's materials through the Red Cross, he resumed doing portraits of POWs and as well as scenes of camp life. He was joined by O'Brien and Martin, once they had been transferred to the camp from Kokkinia.

As an artist, his skills were in demand for forging documents to help with escape attempts. Deans himself had the opportunity to get away from his captors but refrained from doing so; while on a work party outside of the camp, he slipped away from his guards but realised he was too attached to his painting portfolio back at Stalag XX-A to leave them behind. He made his way back to the work party without his absence being noticed. Towards the end of 1943, Deans was transferred to a special POW camp in Germany, just outside of Berlin. Before his move, with the help of the Red Cross, he was able to arrange the shipping of half of his paintings to England.

Conditions at the new POW camp, at Genshagen, were much better. Nominally, the POWs were selected for the camp based on their good behaviour but Deans soon discovered that its actual purpose encourage the prisoners to enlist in the British Free Corps. He stayed only a month before requesting a transfer to a camp in Austria that housed Australian and New Zealand POWs. A couple of his paintings from his time in Genshagen were given to another POW; these were sold to an art gallery in Christchurch in 1987 and are notable for their modernist traits.

Deans was held in Austria at Stalag XVIII-A, near Wolfsberg for well over a year. By this time, the war in Europe was drawing to a close and conditions in the POW camp grew steadily harsher. Despite this, Deans still painted and sketched and by early 1945 had accumulated a portfolio of nearly 300 works. When the camp's POWS were ordered to force march towards Germany, he packaged them up for the Red Cross to collect. The collection of art works were never retrieved and were lost. While on the march, the guards' attention to their charges declined and security became lax with the war all but over. With a group of others, Deans was able to make contact with American forces and made his way back to England. Before he could leave for New Zealand, he had to appear at the trial of Roy Courlander, a New Zealander who had joined the British Free Corps. Once this was complete, he departed England aboard the SS Mooltan on 2 December 1945, arriving back in New Zealand by the end of the year.

== Later life ==
Soon after his return to New Zealand, Deans married Liz née Hutton, the daughter of a farmer. She was a family friend, and Deans had known her since she was an infant. She helped him settle back into civilian life, which he had been struggling with since coming back to New Zealand. In early 1948, the couple's first son was born and later that year the family went to England, Deans having accepted a scholarship to study at the Sir John Cass Technical Institute in Aldgate. He benefited from a higher standard of teaching than he had received to date; his tutors at the institute included Bernard Rice and Nicholas Egon, the latter being known for abstract art and landscapes. The institute instilled in him the confidence to pursue his traditional style of painting, rather than the modernist influences that he had dabbled with while a POW.

The couple settled at Peel Forest, in Canterbury, after finishing their studies in England. To the southwest of Christchurch, Austen saw the area as being similar to the West Coast but with a better climate. While in England, a second son had been born and the couple would add five more boys to their family by 1958. While Liz set up and ran a horse stud, Deans continued to work in landscapes. In 1962, he won first prize in the Kelliher Art Awards with a landscape of the Southern Alps. He won again the following year with a depiction of the Rakaia headwaters. He wrote an autobiography, Pictures by Austen Deans, and in 1970 this was published by A.H. & A.W. Reed. Sales did not justify further printings after the first run was complete. For a number of years, until his resignation in 1970, he was on the management committee of the National Art Gallery, which selected works for its collection.

Despite his age, in his later years Deans made several painting expeditions to the Southern Alps, including an ascent of Aoraki/Mount Cook in 1974, as well as a trip to Antarctica in late 1981, sponsored by the New Zealand Government. He considered the work produced from his Antarctica visit to be some of the best of his career. By this stage of his life, the majority of his income was from commissioned works which he continued to accept even as he approached his late eighties. He received an appointment as an Officer of the Order of the British Empire in the 1995 Queen's Birthday Honours, for services to art.

He died on 18 October 2011 at Princess Margaret's Hospital in Christchurch, having suffered a stroke several days previously. Buried at the Church of the Holy Innocents at Mount Peel, he was survived by his second wife, Margaret née Alpers, who he had married in 2009. His first wife, Liz, had died in May 2004. In November 2018, a sculpture of Deans was unveiled at Peel Forest.

== Legacy ==
Over the course of his painting career, Deans was a prolific producer of landscapes, often from the Canterbury region which meant his work was particularly popular amongst Cantabrians. However, some felt his paintings to be formulaic and clichéd although technically accomplished. The work he produced as a POW was particularly well received by art critics although they have not aged well; many were completed with paints of poor quality or on acid cardboard and have deteriorated.
