= Church of the Holy Innocents, Mount Peel =

Historic church in Canterbury region, New Zealand

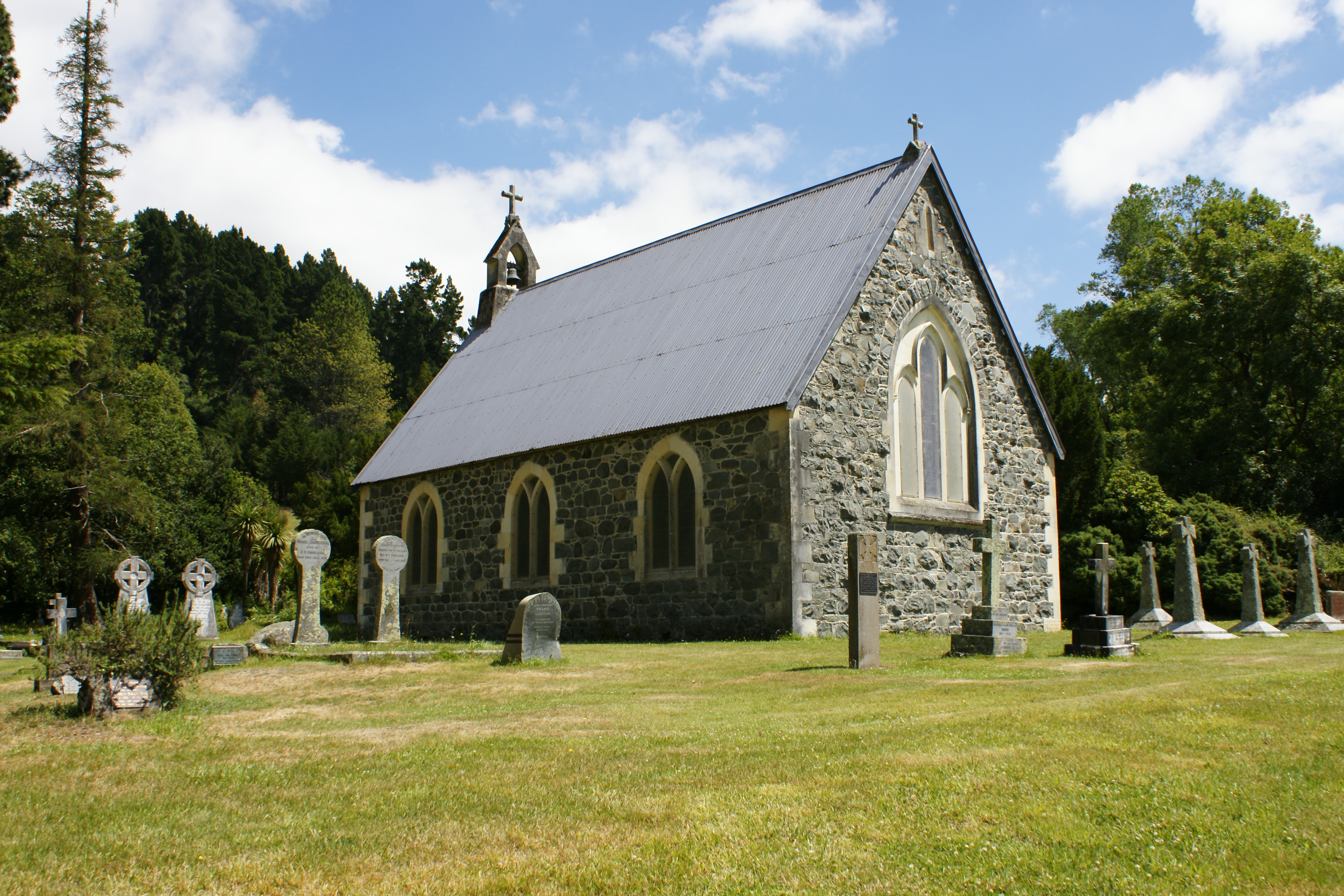
- Church of the Holy Innocents as it appeared in 2009
- Church of the Holy Innocents, Mount Peel
- 43°50′23″S 171°14′50″E
- Location: Rangitata Gorge Road, Mount Peel Station, Mount Peel
- Country: New Zealand
- Denomination: Anglican

History
- Consecrated: 12 December 1869

Architecture
- Functional status: Active
- Architect: Edward Ashworth
- Architectural type: Church
- Style: Gothic Revival
- Years built: 1868–1869
- Completed: 1869

Administration
- Province: Anglican Church in Aotearoa, New Zealand and Polynesia
- Diocese: Christchurch
- Parish: Geraldine

Heritage New Zealand – Category 2
- Official name: Church of the Holy Innocents
- Designated: 11 December 2003
- Reference no.: 1976

The Church of the Holy Innocents is a heritage-listed Anglican church at the Mount Peel Station in the Canterbury Region of New Zealand. Built at the behest of John Acland, the owner of Mount Peel Station, construction of the Gothic Revival stone church began in 1868 and it was in use by the following year. The church was registered by Heritage New Zealand as a Category 2 building in 2003.

== Background ==
In 1854, John Acland, an English lawyer and one of several sons of the baronet Sir Thomas Dyke Acland, emigrated to New Zealand with his friend Charles Tripp to take up sheep farming. The two bought land in the Canterbury high country for the purpose of establishing a runholding. Several blocks of land, including that of Mount Peel, were purchased. In 1862 the partnership between Acland and Tripp was dissolved, and the former retained Mount Peel. Over time, Acland expanded his holding, known as Mount Peel Station, to 100,000 acres and it became one of the most significant high country stations in New Zealand. Although reduced in size from its heyday, it is still owned and operated by Acland's descendants.

== History ==
At Mount Peel Station, Acland built a homestead for himself and his family, which was completed in around 1865. Desiring to establish a village for the people of the station, he also built dwellings for its workers on the property and, being a devout Anglican, a church. This latter building was to become the Church of the Holy Innocents.

The land for the church and its associated cemetery, sited near the Mount Peel homestead, was gifted by Acland in 1866. His brother was the canon of Exeter Cathedral and arranged for Edward Ashworth, an architect for the Diocese of Exeter, to prepare plans for a church building to be constructed of masonry. Ashworth had experience of New Zealand conditions as he had spent time in Auckland in the 1840s. The church was built by William Brassington, a stonemason from Christchurch who had worked on the Christchurch Cathedral. Being built of stone, much of the material was sourced from the bed of the Rangitata River with limestone brought in from Mount Somers.

The foundation stone for the church was laid by Acland's wife Emily on 14 December 1868. It was first used the following year, on 30 May, when Bishop Henry Harper led the opening service. It was subsequently consecrated on 12 December. The church is named for four young children who are buried in its cemetery. Two of them are children of Acland, who is also buried there. The author Ngaio Marsh is another notable interment in the cemetery as is the painter Austen Deans.

== Design ==
The Church of the Holy Innocents is in the Gothic Revival style and is relatively simple in design. Lacking a transept and chancel, entry is via a porch provided to the east end of the building. At the west end is the vestry in an attached, separately roofed structure, with a trefoil in its west facing wall. A bellcote tops the west end of the building; this was designed by Emily Acland and houses a bell which is traditionally rung by an Acland family member to bring in the New Year. The roof is covered with galvanised corrugated iron. The walls are built from greywacke stone with limestone used as window and door dressings, and at the corners of the main building.

In the interior, the walls are plastered while the ceiling is a series of timber trusses supported by curved members that sit stone corbels. The pew and altar are constructed of totara timber. Over the years, it has had several stained glass windows installed, the first being in 1889. Some of these are memorial windows for members of the Acland family and long serving workers on Mount Peel Station. Lacking electricity, there are no lights in the building so illumination is via the windows and oil lamps.

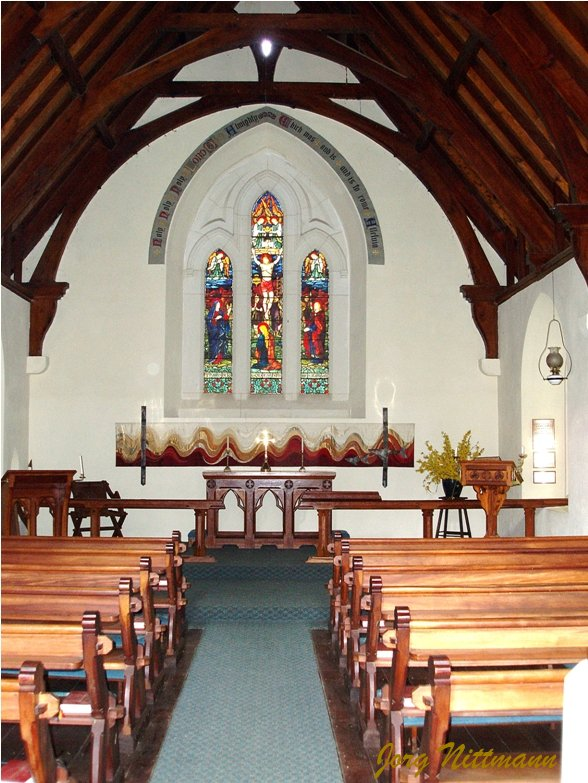
Interior of the Church of the Holy Innocents

== Legacy ==
The Church of the Holy Innocents remains in use as part of the Geraldine Parish of the Anglican Diocese of Christchurch. The building was damaged in the 2010 Christchurch earthquake, with the stained glass window being destroyed and the east gable suffering a partial collapse. After some deliberation by the Diocese of Christchurch, it was decided to restore the building. The restoration was completed at a cost of $1.6 million; with an insurance payout covering less than half of the cost, funding from the Diocese and Heritage New Zealand, together with significant fundraising from John Acland, a descendant of the original owner of Mount Peel Station covered the remainder of the money required. The church was reopened by the Bishop of Christchurch Victoria Matthews in a re-dedication service in September 2017.

Heritage New Zealand listed the Church of the Holy Innocents, located on Rangitata Gorge Road, as a Historic Place Category 2 on 11 December 2003, with a list number of 1976. A factor in its listing was its connection to the Acland family, one of the earliest settler families in the Canterbury high country.
