= Hugh Acland (surgeon) =

New Zealand surgeon

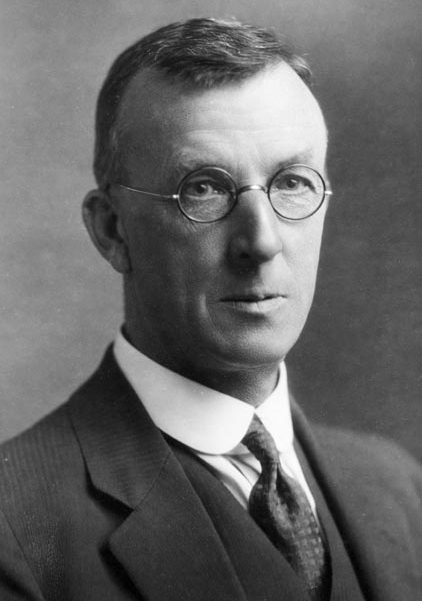
Acland in 1940

Sir Hugh Thomas Dyke Acland CMG CBE (10 September 1874 – 15 April 1956) was a New Zealand surgeon.

== Early life ==
He was born in 1874 in Christchurch. Bishop Harper and Sir Thomas Dyke Acland, 10th Baronet were his grandfathers; John Acland was his father and Jack Acland, MP for Temuka in the 1940s, was his son. The artist Bessie Acland was his sister. Acland was one of the first doctors in New Zealand who confined their medical practice to surgery. He joined the New Zealand Medical Corps for World War I and survived the sinking of the SS Marquette in 1915.

In 1924, Acland bought Chippenham Lodge in Browns Road, St Albans, which had previously belonged to John Evans Brown. His family lived there for the rest of his life.

== Local politics ==
Acland was elected to the North Canterbury Hospital Board in 1927 and remained a member for the following 17 years. He contested the election for Mayor of Christchurch in 1935 and was narrowly beaten by the incumbent, Labour's Dan Sullivan. The election attracted nationwide attention, as Christchurch was a Labour-stronghold and due to Acland's widespread popularity, it was regarded as a test whether Labour could potentially win the November 1935 general election (which it did). Acland was elected as a councillor to Christchurch City Council in 1936 and served until 1941.

== Honours and awards ==
In 1917, Acland was appointed an additional Companion of the Order of St Michael and St George, in recognition of valuable services in connection with World War I. In the 1919 King's Birthday Honours, he was made a Commander of the Order of the British Empire, also for war services. Acland was appointed a Knight Bachelor in the 1933 King's Birthday Honours. In 1935, he was awarded the King George V Silver Jubilee Medal, and in 1953 he received the Queen Elizabeth II Coronation Medal.

== Death and commemoration ==
Acland died in 1956 at Chippenham Lodge. Acland Avenue in Avonside is named for Acland. This short cul-de-sac is located in the residential red zone.
