= Charles Blakiston =

New Zealand politician (1825–1898)

Charles Robert Blakiston (6 July 1825 – 1 September 1898) was a New Zealand politician.

== Biography ==
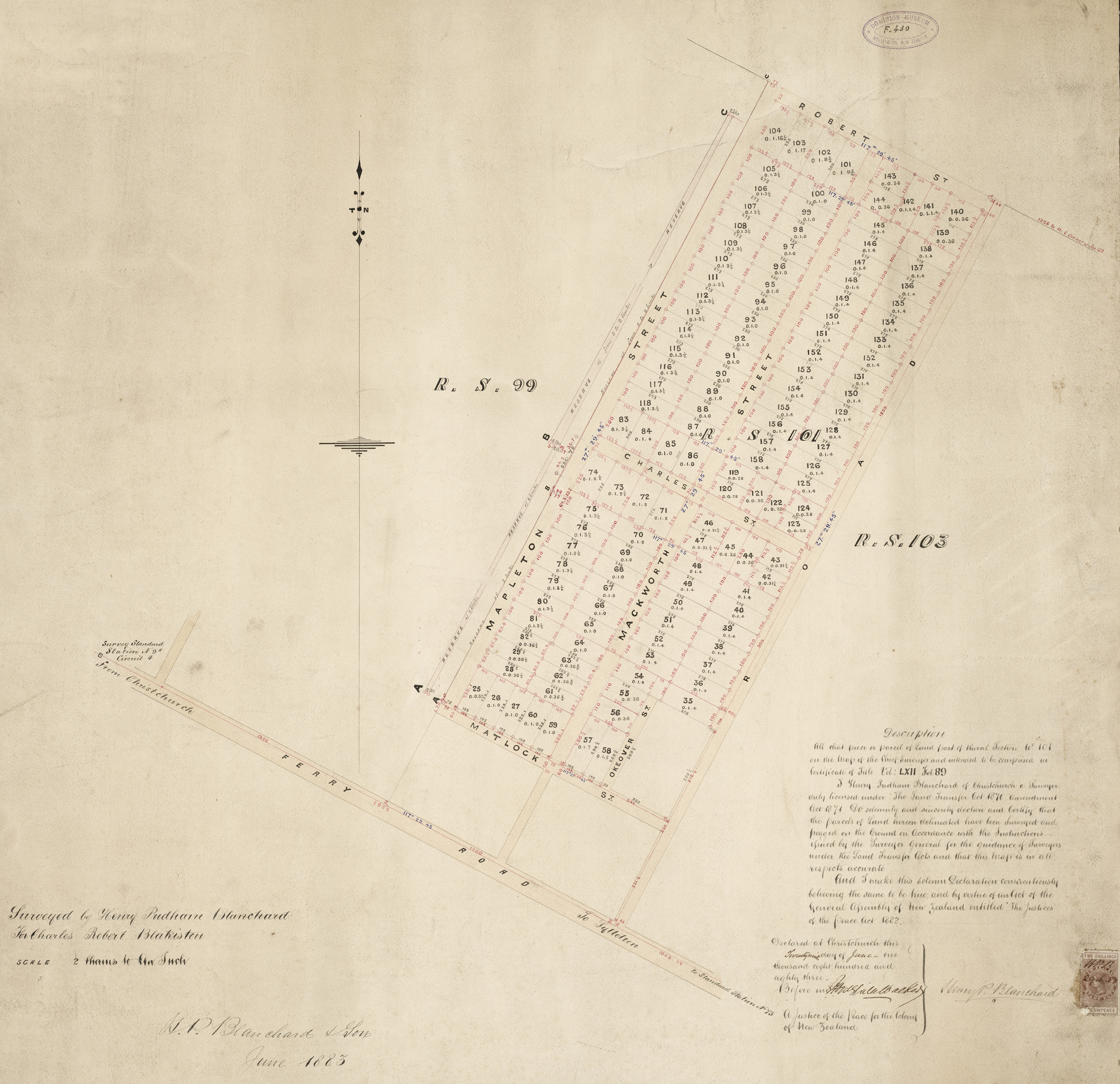
Subdivision plan for Blakiston's land off Ferry Road

Blakiston was born in 1825. His parents were Sir Matthew Blakiston, 3rd Baronet and Lucy Mann (granddaughter of Horatio Mann) of Ashbourne, Derbyshire. Sir Matthew Blakiston, 1st Baronet was his great-grandfather. He came to Melbourne in 1851 with his brother A. F. Blakiston and shortly afterwards to Canterbury. He took land at Ferry Road (rural section (RS) 101), which he subdivided in the 1880s. The resulting village became known as Ashbourne (after Blakiston's birthplace) and is these days part of Woolston.

Blakiston married Mary Anna Harper, the second daughter of Bishop Harper, on 23 September 1858. In the same ceremony, the Bishop's third daughter, Ellen Shephard Harper, married Charles George Tripp.

Blakiston was a member of the New Zealand Legislative Council from 8 October 1857 to 15 July 1862, when he resigned.

He died on 1 September 1898.
