= Charles Tripp (runholder) =

New Zealand sheep farmer

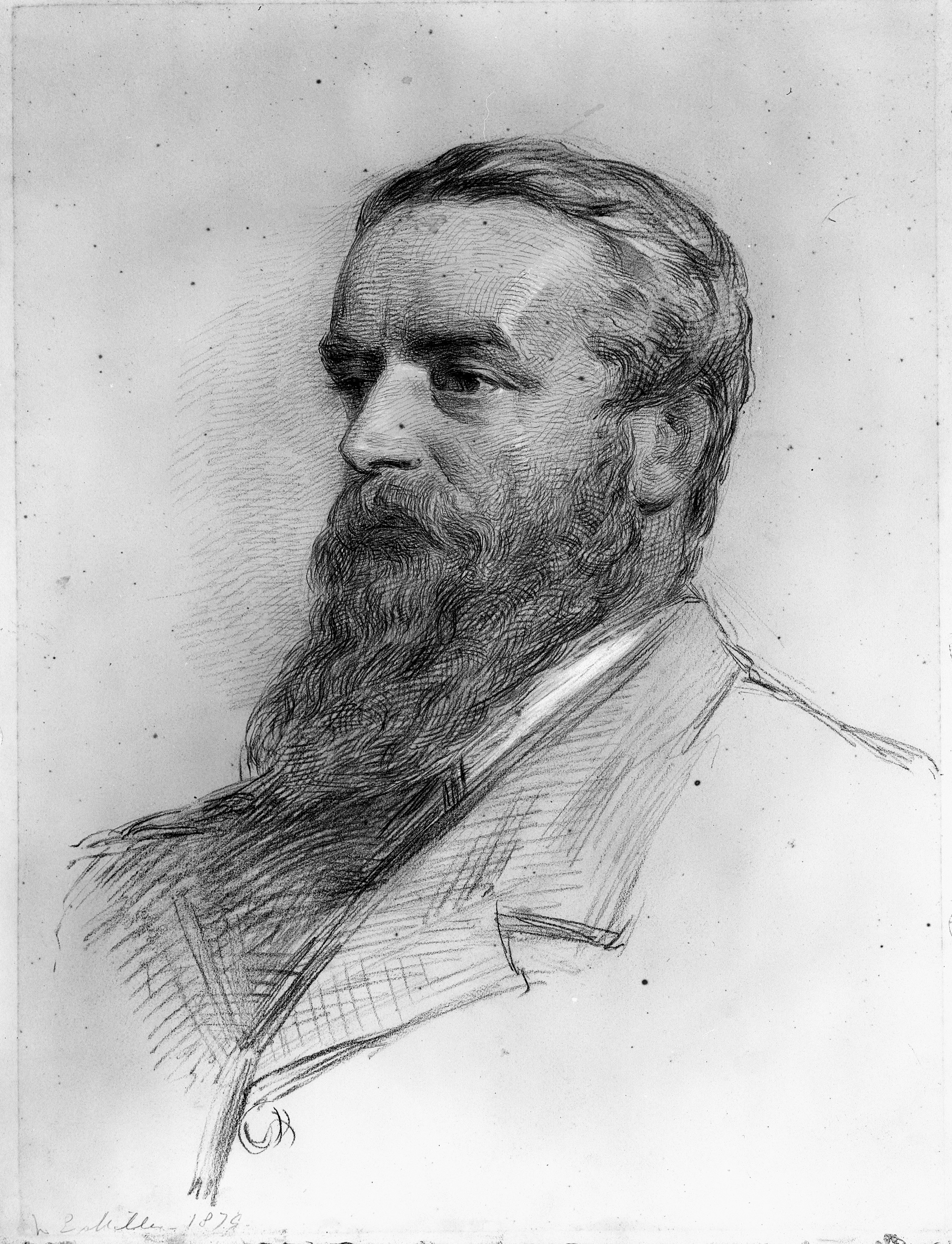
- Tripp in 1878
- Born: 1 July 1826; Kentisbeare, Devon, England
- Died: 6 July 1897 (aged 71); Timaru, New Zealand
- Spouse: Ellen Shephard Tripp (m. 1858)
- Relatives: Bishop Harper (father-in-law); John Acland (brother-in-law); Charles Blakiston (brother-in-law)

Charles George Tripp (1 July 1826 – 6 July 1897) was a pioneering sheep farmer in South Canterbury, New Zealand. Together with his friend and business partner John Acland, he was the first to use the Canterbury high country for sheep farming.

== Early life ==
Tripp was born in Kentisbeare, Mid Devon, England in 1826. His parents were the rector Rev. Charles Tripp and Frances Tripp (née Owen). He received his education at the Merchant Taylors' School in London before studying law. He was called to the bar on 30 April 1853 and introduced his friend, John Acland, to members of the Canterbury Association, who proposed the organised settlement of Canterbury in New Zealand with Anglican ideals; introductions included those to James FitzGerald and John Robert Godley. Acland also worked in law.

== Sheep farming ==
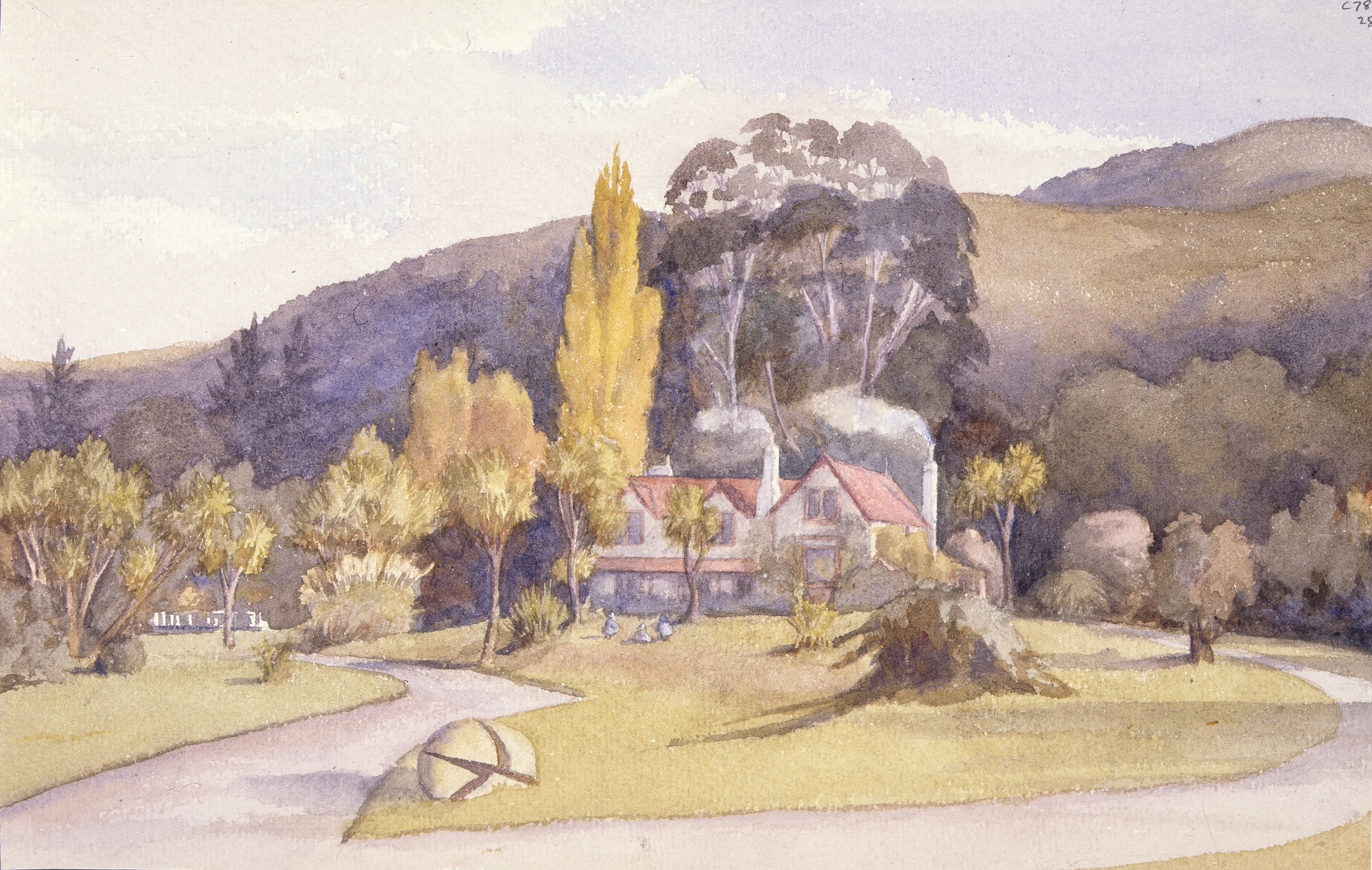
The Orari Gorge homestead in ca 1906

Acland and Tripp gave up their profession and emigrated to New Zealand in 1854 in the Royal Stuart to become sheep farmers. They arrived in Lyttelton on 4 January 1855. Both needed to obtain experience first and thus worked as cadets on established runs; Acland gained experience under Henry Tancred, whilst Tripp worked in Halswell and for one of the Brittan brothers. On 30 July 1855, they applied for land in the foothills in an area that was unexplored and their choice was guesswork; all the suitable land on the Canterbury Plains had been taken up already. Established runholders did not take them seriously, and some laughed at them for wanting to take up high country land, but Acland's attitude was that "in the Colonies you always like to see for yourself, and the worse account you hear of unoccupied country, the greater the reason for going to look at it." In the spring and summer of 1855/56, they started exploring the area. Both had £2,000 of capital, which was insufficient to buy an established station. They took up land including Mount Somers, Mount Possession, Mount Peel, Orari Gorge and parts of Hakatere and Mesopotamia, and were the first who put sheep in the high country. The first station they worked on was Mount Peel from May 1856, and while they prepared the run, they left their sheep with Dr Moorhouse, a brother of William Sefton Moorhouse, on the other side of the Rangitata River. Their partnership was dissolved in October 1862, and Tripp retained Orari Gorge and Mount Somers.

== Family ==
In 1858, Charles Tripp married Ellen Shephard Harper, the third daughter of Bishop Harper. In the same ceremony, the Bishop's second daughter, Mary Anna Harper, married Charles Blakiston. The Tripps went to Akaroa for their honeymoon, riding there on horseback. On 17 January 1860, Acland married Emily Weddell Harper, the eldest daughter of Bishop Harper, at St Michael's Church. The Bishop's fifth daughter, Sarah Shephard Harper, was married at the same ceremony. With Acland's marriage, the former business partners became brothers in law.

In 1862, Tripp and his wife went to visit England. His ailing father did not believe the stories of success, so Tripp instructed his agent to sell Orari Gorge Station and transfer the money to England as proof. When they returned to New Zealand, he bought the station back.

== Death ==
After an illness of the liver lasting several months, Tripp died at Timaru on 6 July 1897. He was buried at Woodbury Cemetery (near Geraldine) three days later.
