= Jack Acland =

New Zealand politician (1904–1981)

Sir Jack Acland KBE JP
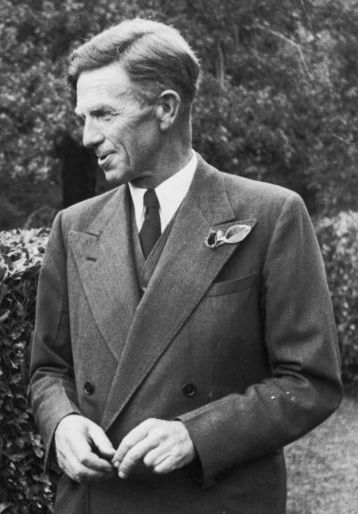
- Acland in 1956

Member of the New Zealand Parliament for Temuka
- In office 1942–1946
- Preceded by: Thomas Burnett
- Succeeded by: Constituency abolished

Personal details
- Born: Hugh John Dyke Acland; 17 January 1904 Christchurch, New Zealand
- Died: 26 January 1981 (aged 77)
- Party: National
- Spouse: Katherine Wilder Ormond (m. 1935)
- Relations: Hugh Acland (father); John Acland (grandfather); Sir Thomas Dyke Acland, 10th Baronet (great-grandfather); John Ormond (brother-in-law)

Sir Hugh John Dyke Acland KBE JP (17 January 1904 – 26 January 1981) was a New Zealand politician of the National Party.

== Early life ==
Acland was born in 1904 in Christchurch. His parents were Sir Hugh Acland (1874–1956), a prominent surgeon in New Zealand, and Evelyn Mary Acland (née Ovans). His great-grandfather was Sir Thomas Dyke Acland, 10th Baronet. His brother-in-law was Sir John Ormond. His cousin was Felicity Lusk, headmistress. He was educated at Waihi School and Christ's College.

When riding his motorbike, Acland was hit by a car on Christchurch's Park Terrace in October 1924. He suffered a complex break of his leg just above the ankle, and spent over a month in bed at his parents’ house, Chippenham Lodge. With Frederick Wilding KC as his lawyer, he won a substantial compensation from the driver, and used the money to have his leg reset in England, where he spent one year. Despite this, he limped for the rest of his life.

On 12 June 1935, Acland married Katherine "Kit" Wilder Ormond, daughter of John Davies Ormond Jr. and granddaughter of John Davies Ormond Sr. The wedding was held at St Mary's Church at Waipukurau.

He worked on farms in South Canterbury, was a stockman and a driver. He worked in various jobs in Australia for some time before taking on the management of Mount Peel Station, which had been established by his grandfather, John Acland. Due to his leg injury, he was rejected by the army.

== Political career ==
New Zealand Parliament
Years	Term	Electorate	Party
1942–1943	26th	Temuka	National
1943–1946	27th	Temuka	National

He was elected to Parliament in the Canterbury electorate of Temuka in the 1942 by-election, filling the vacancy caused by the death of Thomas Burnett. He was confirmed in the 1943 general election. The Temuka electorate was abolished for the 1946 election, when he stood in the Timaru electorate and was defeated by the incumbent from the Labour Party, Clyde Carr.

Acland gained prominence in the wool industry. He chaired the New Zealand Wool Board (1960–1972) and was vice-president of the International Wool Secretariat. He was appointed a Knight Commander of the Order of the British Empire in the 1968 Queen's Birthday Honours, for services to the wool industry. He died on 27 January 1981.

== Notes ==
New Zealand Parliament
Preceded by Thomas Burnett	Member of Parliament for Temuka; 1942–1946	Electorate abolished
