= Chippenham Lodge =

Heritage building in Christchurch, New Zealand

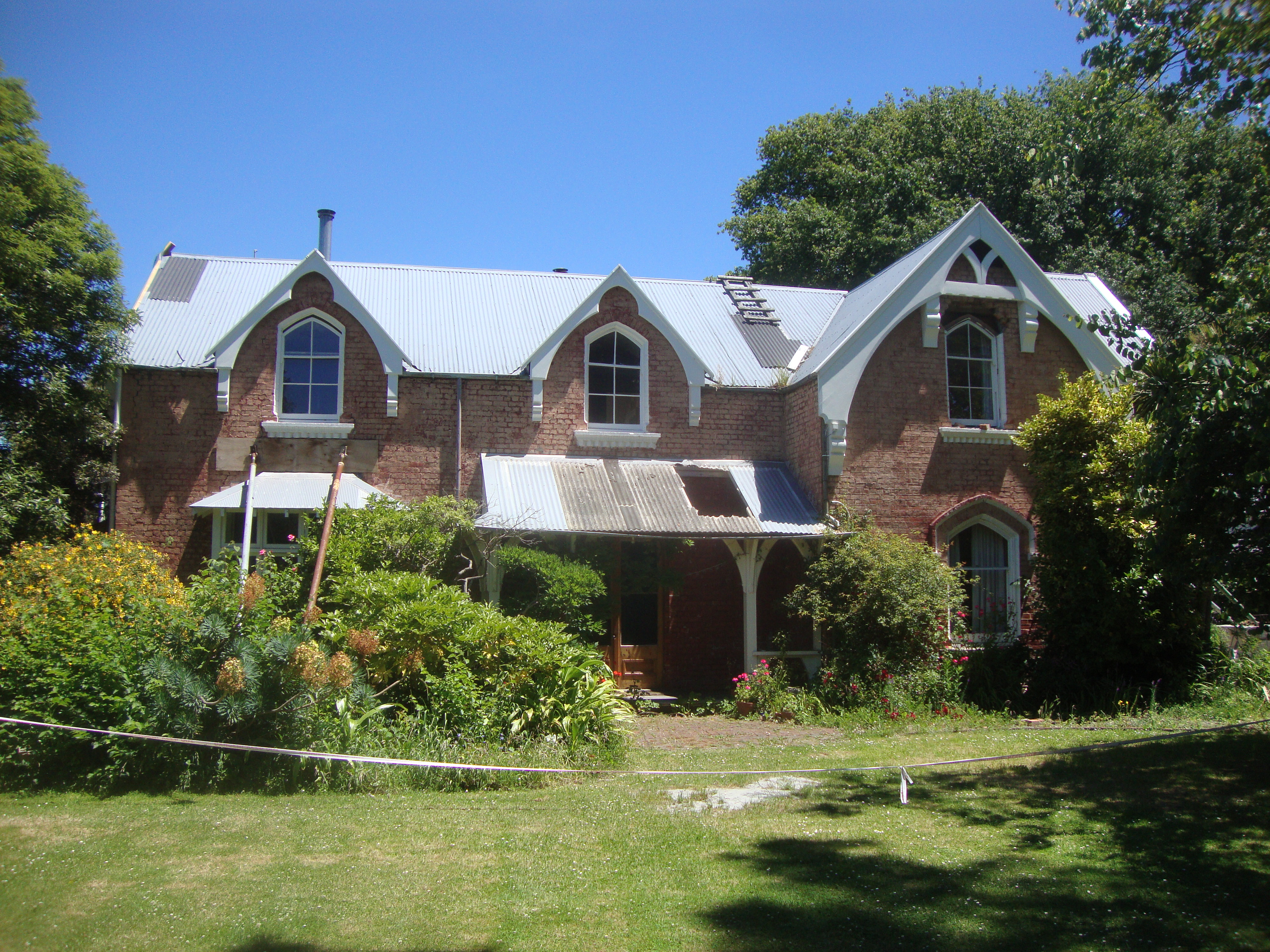
- Chippenham Lodge in December 2011
- Interactive map of the Chippenham Lodge area

General information
- Location: St Albans, 51 Browns Road, Christchurch, New Zealand
- Coordinates: 43.5092°S 172.6246°E
- Completed: 1863
- Client: Francis and George Goldney

Technical details
- Structural system: unreinforced masonry
- Floor count: two

Design and construction
- Architects: Benjamin Mountfort (probably); Maxwell Bury (1865 southern wing)

Heritage New Zealand – Category 2
- Official name: Chippenham Lodge
- Designated: 25 June 2004
- Reference no.: 1846

Chippenham Lodge is a heritage building in the Christchurch, New Zealand suburb of St Albans.

== Etymology ==
Chippenham Lodge was named by their first owners, the brothers Francis and George Goldney, for their birthplace Chippenham in Wiltshire, England. It is located in Brown's Road, which was named for John Evans Brown, one of the notable owners of Chippenham Lodge.

== History ==
The Goldney brothers bought 26 acres (0.11 km^{2}) of land in St Albans for their Christchurch home in 1862. They were the owners of the 20,000 acres (81 km^{2}) Cora Lynn sheep station in the Southern Alps in the upper Waimakariri basin. There is uncertainty whether their town residence was designed by Benjamin Mountfort or Maxwell Bury, but from the stylistic features, the work was more likely undertaken by Mountfort. The substantial brick home had six rooms.

George Goldney returned to England and the building was sold to Henry Mytton on 12 September 1865 for £1,400. Later that year, Mytton commissioned a substantial southern extension for the building from Mountfort and Bury, who by then were business partners. This turned Chippenham Lodge into a house with ten rooms. The plainer design suggests that Bury carried out the commission. Mytton was born in 1840 in Garth, Glamorgan, Wales, the son of the judge R. H. Mytton, and he worked in Christchurch as a merchant and commission agent. Mytton's business failed in 1867, his household effects were sold, and he left New Zealand for England on the Mermaid in the following year.

The lawyer Thomas Joynt occupied the building for some time before it was sold in 1875 to John Thomas Peacock, who owned the neighbouring Hawkesbury house. Peacock had previously represented the Lyttelton electorate in the House of Representatives, and at the time of the purchase was a member of the Legislative Council and the Canterbury Provincial Council.

Peacock transferred the house in the same year to his brother-in-law, John Evans Brown, who moved in with his wife (Peacock's sister) and children. Brown sometimes referred to his home as simply 'The Lodge'. While living there, Brown lost his eldest son aged 16 in February 1877, and four days later, an infant son also died. His wife died at Chippenham aged 42 years in February 1880; all three are buried at Barbadoes Street Cemetery. Brown moved to the nearby Amwell after his wife's death, but the house remained in his estate. Brown remarried in late 1883 and then emigrated to America in August 1884. They went to Asheville in North Carolina, where he died on 9 July 1895. While Brown had lived at Chippenham Lodge, he represented the Ashley electorate in the House of Representatives.

Walter Joseph Moore bought Chippenham Lodge from the Brown estate in 1902. Moore, who was an accountant and estate agent, undertook some subdivision. In 1924, the property was sold to the surgeon Hugh Acland, who kept subdivided some more land and kept the house until his death in 1961.

After Acland, there were two more owners prior to the current owner, the Heartwood Community Incorporated, which bought the house in 1971. This commune was active in social and political issues. Many prominent organisations held their first meeting at Chippenham or were founded there, including HART (Halt All Racist Tours), Greenpeace Aotearoa New Zealand, and Women's Refuge. Christchurch Women's Refuge, which was started in a house next door to Chippenham Lodge, celebrated its 40th birthday in May 2013. At its peak as a commune, 20 people were living in the building, including Marian Hobbs, who would later become a cabinet minister in the Fifth Labour Government.

Chippenham Lodge was significantly damaged in the February 2011 Christchurch earthquake. As it will have to be "virtually rebuilt" anyway and is hidden at the end of a long drive, the current owners have proposed to relocate it to the edge of the Christchurch Botanic Gardens in Hagley Park to make it accessible to the public.

== Heritage listing ==
Chippenham Lodge was originally registered as a heritage building by Heritage New Zealand with registration number 1846 classified as C, as shown in the 1988 publication Historic Buildings of Canterbury and South Canterbury. With the change of the classification system, the building later became a Category II listing. Following an audit of the heritage register in 2003, there were some deficient registrations identified by the Historic Places Trust that had to go through the registration process again; mostly in cases where a valid board minute could not be found upon audit. As such, the date of registration is shown as 25 June 2004 when it had already been listed prior to 1988.

== See also ==
- List of oldest buildings in Christchurch
