= Emily Acland =

New Zealand settler and watercolourist

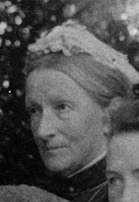
- Acland in 1890
- Born: 1830
- Died: 24 July 1905 (aged 74–75)
- Spouse: John Acland
- Relatives: Henry Harper (father); Leonard Harper (brother); Bessie Acland (daughter)

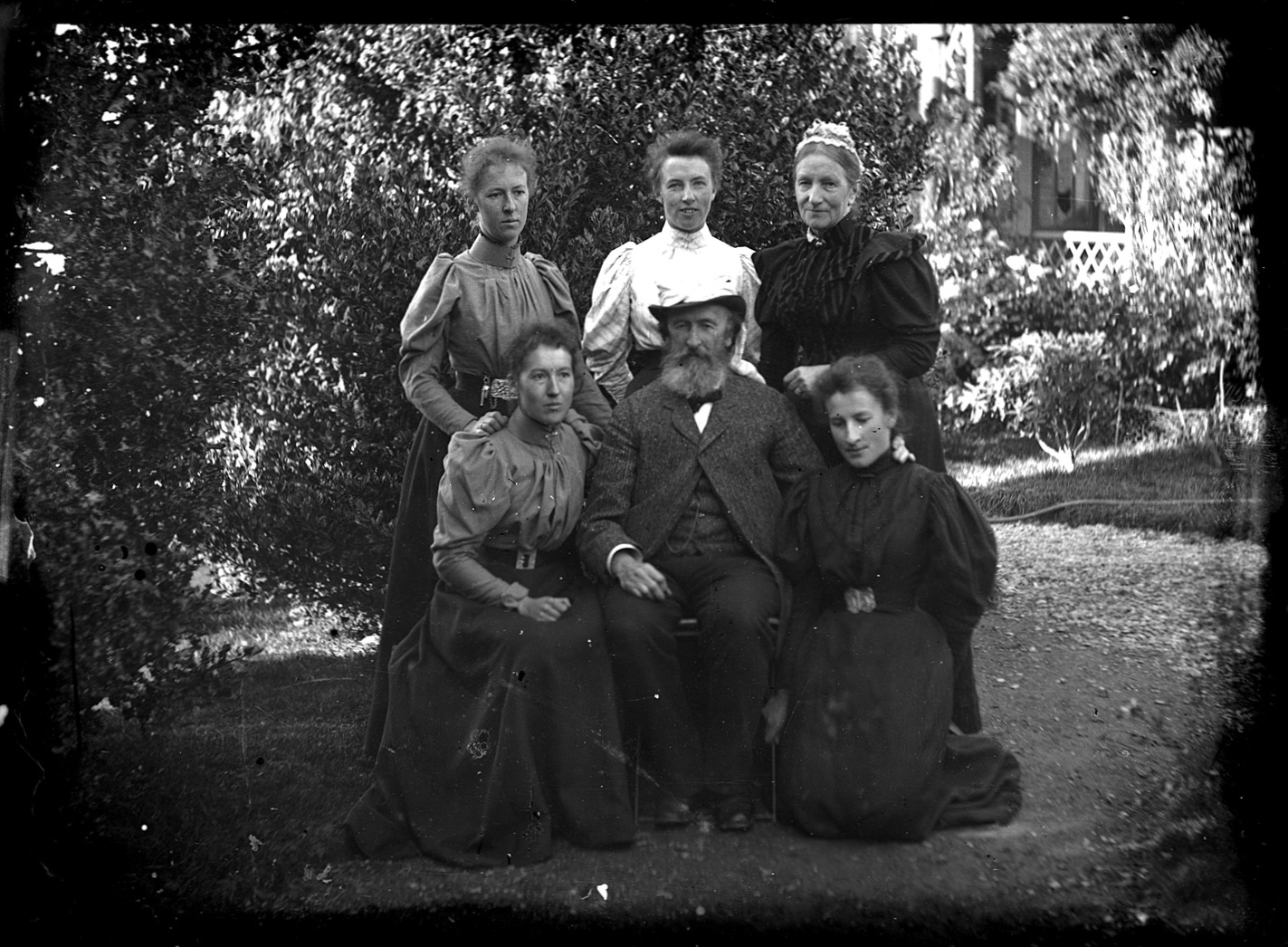
Standing from left: Lucy, Harriet and Emily; sitting: Bessie, John and Rosa (1890)

Emily Weddell Acland (née Harper, 1830 – 24 July 1905) was a pioneer settler in New Zealand and a watercolour artist. She remains a prominent figure in colonial New Zealand history for questioning gender roles within domestic settings. Her paintings of early Christchurch are held in the collection of the Christchurch Art Gallery.

== Biography ==
Acland was born in 1830, the eldest daughter of 15 children of her parents Henry Harper, who became Bishop of Christchurch (serving from 1869–1890), and Emily Harper (née Wooldridge). The family arrived in Christchurch on 23 December 1856 on the Egmont.

On 17 January 1860, she married politician John Acland at St Michael's Church in Christchurch. John Acland owned land in the Canterbury high country at Mount Peel, and the couple farmed there together. John even made Emily her own garden bed at Mt Peel for her own use not long after announcing their engagement. They had 11 children of whom two died in infancy. Acland became a keen mountaineer and the Emily Falls in Peel Forest are named after her. Acland also went on fern collecting expeditions.

Acland died in Christchurch on 24 July 1905 after a short illness. She was survived by her three sons and five daughters.
