= Arthur Paul Harper =

New Zealand lawyer, mountaineer, explorer, businessman, conservationist (1865–1955)

Arthur Paul Harper CBE (27 June 1865 – 30 May 1955) was a New Zealand lawyer, mountaineer, explorer, businessman and conservationist. Known simply as AP or APH, he was born at his parents' house in Armagh Street, Christchurch, New Zealand, in 1865.

He was the son of the MP and lawyer Leonard Harper; Bishop Henry Harper was his grandfather. He matriculated at Christ Church, Oxford in 1884. He was the inaugural secretary and treasurer of the New Zealand Alpine Club, which was founded in July 1891 in Christchurch.

In 1935, Harper was awarded the King George V Silver Jubilee Medal. In 1950, he was awarded the Loder Cup. In the 1952 New Year Honours, he was appointed a Commander of the Order of the British Empire for services to the community. He died in Wellington in 1955, just a few weeks shy of his 90th birthday. He is the namesake of Mount Harper in Canterbury.

== Selected publications ==
- Harper, Arthur Paul (1896). Pioneer Work in the Alps of New Zealand.
- Southern Alps of New Zealand. 1923.
- Memories of Mountains and Men. 1946.
