= Matthew Blakiston =

British merchant and Lord Mayor of London (c.1702–1774)

Sir Matthew Blakiston, 1st Baronet (c. 1702 – 14 July 1774) was a British merchant, grocer and baronet.

He was the son of George Blakiston and his wife Elizabeth Kay, daughter of Matthew Kay. He was an Alderman of London from 1750 to 1769, was elected Sheriff of London in 1754 and became the 442nd Lord Mayor of London in 1761. He was knighted at Kensington Palace in 1759 and was created a Baronet, of the City of London on 22 April 1763. Blakiston served as colonel of the Green Regiment of the London Trained Bands. He died at Jermyn Street in London.

Blakiston married firstly Margaret Hall, daughter of Reverend Charles Hall. His second wife, Mary Blew, died in 1754 and Blakiston married thirdly Annabella Bayley, daughter of Thomas Bayley in St Johns, London on 8 April 1760. He had a son by his first wife and two sons by his third wife. He was succeeded in the baronetcy by his second and only surviving son, Matthew.

Honorary titles
Preceded by Sir Thomas Chitty	Lord Mayor of London; 1760–1761	Succeeded by Sir Samuel Fludyer, 1st Baronet
Baronetage of Great Britain
New creation	Baronet (of London); 1763–1774	Succeeded by Matthew Blakiston
