= Henry Harper (priest) =

Anglican archdeacon

The Ven. Henry William Harper, MA (1833 – 20 January 1922) was an eminent New Zealand Anglican priest in the late 19th and early 20th centuries.

He was the eldest son of Henry Harper, the Primate of New Zealand. He was educated at Eton College and Trinity College, Oxford and ordained in 1858. After a curacy at Waimakariri he was Vicar of Hokitika then Timaru. He was Archdeacon of Timaru from 1875 to 1911.

He died on 20 January 1922.
