= Mount Peel =

Mountain in Canterbury, New Zealand

Coordinates: 43°50′48″S 171°09′24″E

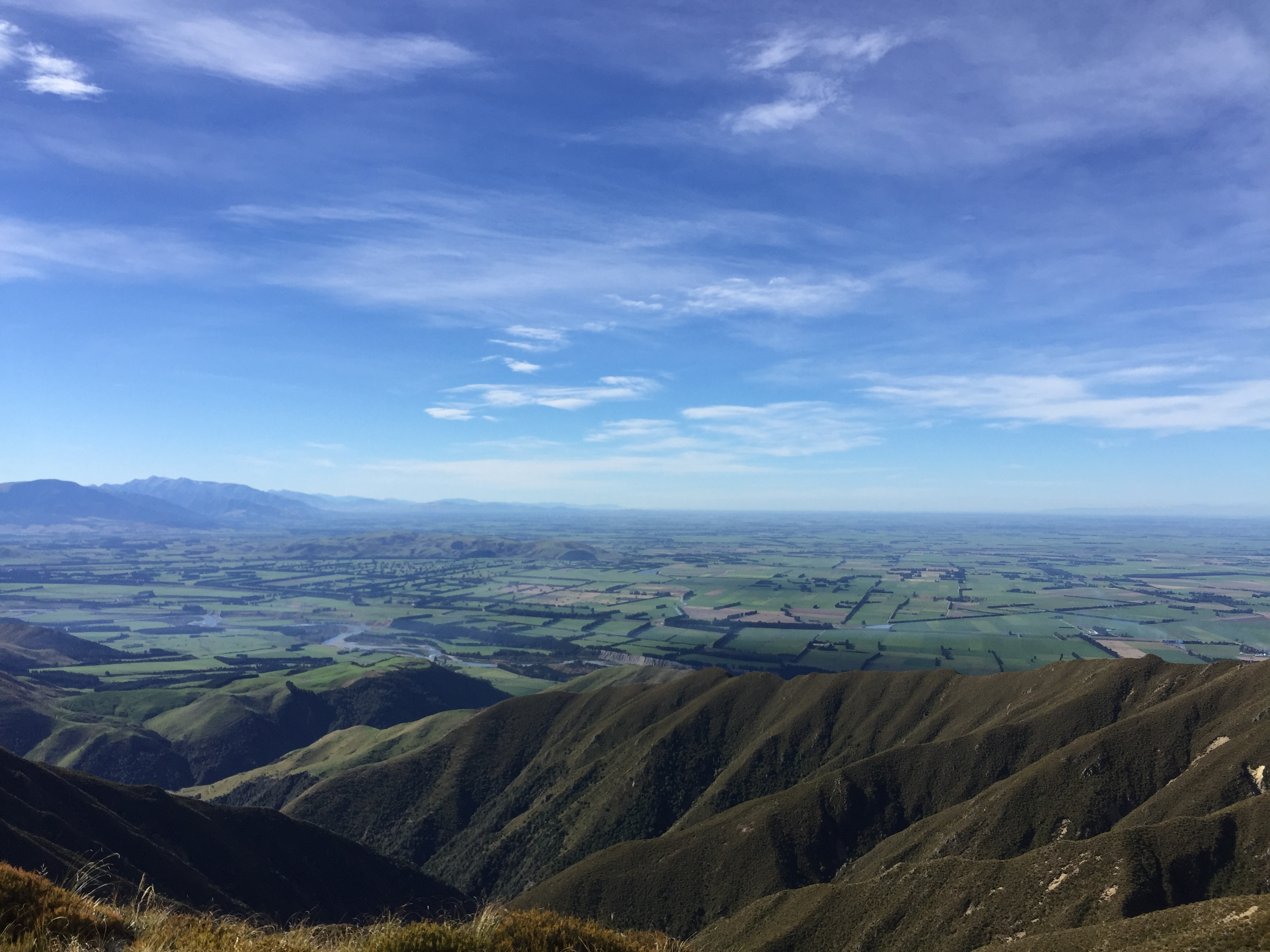
A view from Middle Mount Peel overlooking the Canterbury Plains

Mount Peel is a mountain located in South Canterbury, New Zealand. It consists of three peaks, Mount Peel (often referred to as Big Mount Peel), Middle Mount Peel (1,583 metres or 5,194 feet) and Little Mount Peel / Huatekerekere (1,311 metres or 4,301 feet). Mount Peel is 1,743 metres (5,719 ft) tall and is owned by the Department of Conservation and Mount Peel Station. It lies just south of the Rangitata river and is 22 kilometres (14 mi) north-west of Geraldine.

The Peel Forest Park Scenic Reserve is the largest in the Geraldine area, covering 769 hectares (1,900 acres) around Little Mount Peel / Huatekerekere.

== Etymology ==
The nearby forest was named by Francis Jollie, who settled in the area in late 1853. Jollie had named the forest after Robert Peel, the British Prime Minister of the United Kingdom who had died in 1850, the year that Canterbury was founded. The mountain and the nearby community of Peel Forest also took Peel's name.

== Access ==
Mount Peel and the surrounding Peel Forest contain many well maintained and popular walking tracks. There is also a small, less maintained track, heading from Little Mount Peel to Middle Mount Peel and then to Mount Peel. Different tracks cater to different climbing abilities, ranging from short 30 minute walks, to full day/overnight tramps. Just below the summit of Little Mt Peel/Huatekerekere is the small Tristram Harper Memorial hut. Complete with rain water storage, two beds and long drop. A trig station is located on top of Little Mt Peel, while a cell tower and communication hut are found at the top of Mt Peel.

== Flora and fauna ==
There is much unique flora and fauna in Peel Forest. The three largest trees in Peel Forest belong to the family Podocarpaceae, a very ancient family going back in time more than 100 million years. The three large trees are kahikatea (white pine), tōtara, and mataī (black pine).

The native birds in the forest include bellbird, silvereye, tomtit, rifleman, grey warbler, kererū, fantail, silvereye, shining cuckoo and longtailed cuckoo. There are also many lizards including the jeweled gecko and McCann's skink.
