= 1854 Town of Nelson by-election =

New Zealand by-election

Coordinates: 41.275°S 173.284°E

- 17 June 1854
	First party	Second party
	Ind
Candidate	Samuel Stephens	Francis Jollie
Party	Independent	Independent
Show of hands	Won	Lost
- Approximate electorate boundary
Member before election
William Travers
Independent
Elected Member
Samuel Stephens
Independent

The 1854 Town of Nelson by-election was a by-election held on 17 June 1854 in the multi-member Town of Nelson electorate during the first New Zealand Parliament. It was the first parliamentary by-election held in New Zealand.

Town of Nelson MP William Travers and neighbouring Waimea MP William Cautley resigned on 26 May 1854, two days after the start of the first parliamentary session. On 17 June, Samuel Stephens and Francis Jollie were both nominated (in absentia), and after a show of hands Stephens was declared the winner.

Outgoing MP Travers was subsequently elected two days later in the Waimea by-election; as expected, Jollie coming second.

== Nomination meeting ==
The nomination meeting was held on Saturday, 17 June 1854 at the court house. The returning officer was John Poynter. No contest was expected, so a minimal number of electors were present. First the writ was read by Poynter, and then afterwards he called for the small number of electors to proceed with the nominations.

Mr Webb proposed Francis Jollie, which was seconded by Mr Cann. B Walmsley nominated Samuel Stephens, seconded by Travers. Neither candidate was able to attend the meeting; Stephens was in the Auckland Region, and Jollie had moved to Peel Forest in Canterbury in late 1853. Therefore, no speeches were given by the candidates.

Following a show of hands, Stephens was declared elected, as Jollie's supporters did not demand a poll.

== Result ==
1854 Town of Nelson by-election
Party	Candidate	Votes	%	±%
Independent	Samuel Stephens	Majority	>50%	(new)
Independent	Francis Jollie	Minority	<50%	(new)
Registered electors		239		
Independent gain from Independent				
