= 1854 Waimea by-election =

New Zealand by-election

- 21 June 1854
- Turnout: 197 (48.64%)

	First party	Second party
Candidate	William Travers	Francis Jollie
Party	Independent	Independent
Popular vote	125	71
Percentage	63.96%	36.04%
Member before election
William Cautley
Independent
Elected Member
William Travers
Independent

The 1854 Waimea by-election was a by-election held on 21 June 1854 in the multi-member Waimea electorate during the first New Zealand Parliament. It was the second parliamentary by-election in New Zealand, and the first contested by-election. It occurred two days after the Town of Nelson by-election.

Waimea MP William Cautley and neighbouring Town of Nelson MP William Travers both resigned on 26 May 1854, two days after the start of the first parliamentary session. On 20 June, Travers and Francis Jollie were nominated (Jollie being nominated in absentia). After a show of hands went in Jollie's favour, Travers demanded a poll. Travers was subsequently elected the following day.

== Background ==
Up to 17 June 1854 it was unknown in the public that multiple candidates would seek nomination by the electors; Francis Jollie was thought to be the only candidate. On that date William Travers, who had resigned from the Town of Nelson electorate on the same date as Cautley, announced his candidacy.

=== Nomination meeting ===
The nomination meeting was held on 20 June 1854 in Richmond, with the polling date set for 21 June. There was a reasonable number of electors present. The Returning Officer then read the writ. F. Otterson proposed Francis Jollie, as expected, seconded by Mr. Harkness. J. W. Saxton said he was happy to propose Mr. William L. T. Travers, a nomination seconded by S. Wells. A show of hands then happened after speeches, which was declared in favour of Jollie, to which Travers demanded a poll.

== Result ==
1854 Waimea by-election
Party	Candidate	Votes	%	±%
Independent	William Travers	126	63.96	(new)
Independent	Francis Jollie	71	36.04	(new)
Turnout		197	48.64	
Majority		55		
Registered electors		405		

=== By district ===
Results by district
District	Travers (IND)	Jollie (IND)	Valid
Waimea East	37	23	60
Waimea West	4	19	23
Waimea South	55	4	59
Suburban North	7	14	21
Suburban South	23	11	34
Total	126	71	197
