= Kelling (surname) =

Kelling is a surname. Notable people with the surname include:

- Charles Kelling (1818–1898), New Zealand emigration agent, farmer and community leader
- Fedor Kelling (1820–1909), German-born New Zealand politician
- Georg Kelling (1866–1945), German internist and surgeon
- George L. Kelling (1935–2019), American criminologist
- Graeme Kelling (1957–2004), Scottish musician
- John Kelling (disambiguation), multiple people
