= 1878 Cheviot by-election =

New Zealand by-election

The 1878 Cheviot by-election was a by-election held on 21 May 1878 during the 6th New Zealand Parliament in the electorate of Cheviot in Canterbury.

The by-election was caused by the resignation of the incumbent MP Leonard Harper on 2 April 1878.

The by-election was won by Alfred Saunders.

== Results ==
The following table gives the election result:

1878 Cheviot by-election
Party	Candidate	Votes	%	±%
Independent	Alfred Saunders	94	57.67	
Independent	Henry Ingles	69	42.33	
Turnout		163		
Majority		25	15.34	
