= Francis Jollie =

New Zealand politician

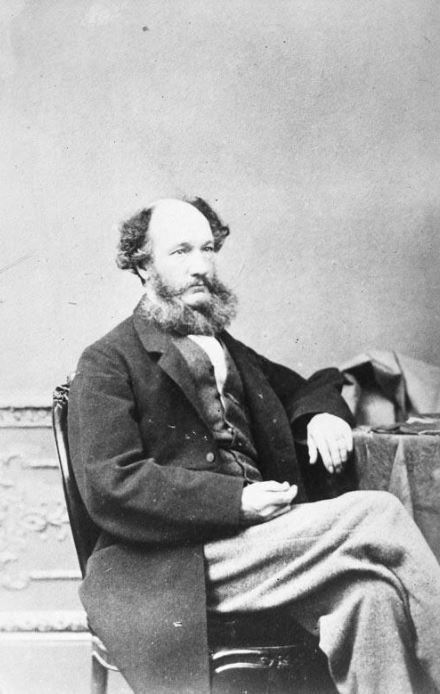
Francis Jollie

Francis Jollie (1815 – 30 November 1870) was a politician in New Zealand.

== Biography ==
=== Early life and career ===
Jollie was born in 1815. The family was from Brampton, Carlisle, England. His father was the Reverend Francis Jollie, and he was the oldest son; the fourth son was Edward Jollie.

He was one of the earliest settlers in the country, having arrived in 1842 as the agent of the New Zealand Company. He arrived in Nelson on the ship Fifeshire, where he farmed on fifty acres of land he had purchased at Wakapuaka, and called his property 'Thackwood'. He was followed to New Zealand by his younger brother Edward. In August 1853, Francis Jollie was one of the three candidates in the inaugural election for the superintendency of Nelson Province. Jollie came last, and Edward Stafford was successful.

Later in 1853, Jollie moved to Peel Forest in Canterbury, where he would live for the rest of his life. He named the forest after Sir Robert Peel, the British Prime Minister of the United Kingdom who had died in 1850, the year that Canterbury was founded. The adjacent mountain also took Peel's name.

In June 1854 Jollie was nominated for two by-elections in the Nelson area. In the 1854 by-election for Waimea Jollie came second in the poll, held on 21 June. In the 1854 by-election for the Town of Nelson electorate held on 19 June. Jollie was one of the nominees, and both he and the other candidate Samuel Stephens were absent. Stephens won the by-election on a show of hands at the nomination meeting, as Jollie's supporters did not request an election.

In 1858, Jollie returned to England for some time. Upon coming back to New Zealand on the Clontarf, he briefly lived near Christchurch. He married Jane Cooper on 28 May 1859 at Riccarton Church, Christchurch.

=== Member of Parliament ===
New Zealand Parliament
Years	Term	Electorate	Party
1861–1866	3rd	Timaru	Independent
1866–1870	4th	Gladstone	Independent

He was the Member of Parliament for Timaru from 1861 to 1866 and then Gladstone from 1866 to 1870, when he died. He was a cabinet minister, as Colonial Treasurer (now called Minister of Finance) in the second Stafford Ministry from 1866 to 1869. It was understood that he did not intend to stand in the 1871 general election.

=== Death ===
He died on 30 November 1870 at his residence at Peel Forest aged 55.

== Notes ==
Political offices
Preceded by Edward Stafford	Colonial Treasurer; 1866	Succeeded by William Fitzherbert
New Zealand Parliament
New constituency	Member of Parliament for Timaru; 1861–1866	Succeeded by Alfred Cox
New constituency	Member of Parliament for Gladstone; 1866–1870	Succeeded by George Parker
