= 1867 Waimea by-election =

New Zealand by-election

The 1867 Waimea by-election was a by-election held on 28 June 1867 in the Waimea electorate during the 3rd New Zealand Parliament.

The by-election was caused by the resignation of the incumbent MP Arthur Robert Oliver on 9 January 1867.

The by-election was won by Edward Baigent.

== Results ==
1867 Waimea by-election
Party	Candidate	Votes	%	±%
Independent	Edward Baigent	99	58.24	
Independent	Joseph Shephard	71	35.15	
Independent	Fedor Kelling	32	15.84	
Turnout		202		
Majority		28	13.86	
