= 1859 Waimea by-election =

New Zealand by-election

The Waimea by-election of 1859 was a by-election for the electorate of Waimea during the 2nd New Zealand Parliament. It was triggered by the resignation of William Travers when he was appointed as a judge. According to Wilson, Travers was disqualified under the Act of 1858, and vacated the seat on 26 July 1859.

Only one candidate was nominated on 26 December 1859, Fedor Kelling, and he was immediately declared elected.
