= 1858 Waimea by-election =

New Zealand by-election

The Waimea by-election 1858 was a by-election held in the multi-member Waimea electorate during the 2nd New Zealand Parliament, on 21 May 1858.

The by-election was caused by the resignation of incumbent MP Charles Elliott on 20 March 1858.

The by-election was won unopposed by David Monro, who had represented the seat in the previous parliament.
