= Ken Light =

Archdeacon of Southland, New Zealand

Ken Light (born 1945) is an Anglican former archdeacon of Southland, New Zealand.

Light was educated at the University of Otago and became a deacon in 1970 and an Anglican priest in 1971. He was curate in Anderson's Bay and Invercargill and then vicar at Wyndham and Waimea in New Zealand until his appointment as archdeacon.
