= Edward Baigent =

New Zealand politician

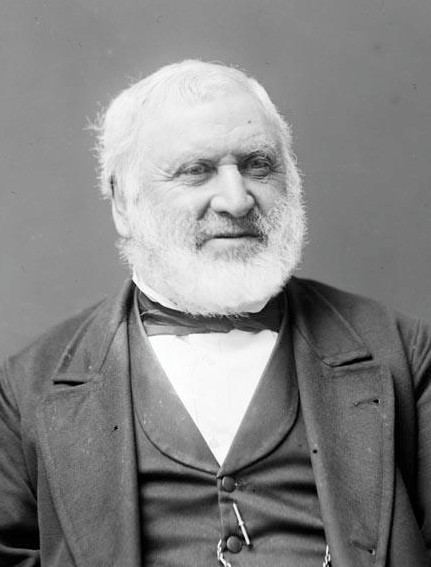
- Baigent in 1884

Member of the New Zealand Parliament for Waimea
- In office 1867–1870
- In office 1876–1879

Personal details
- Born: 22 June 1813 Windlesham, Surrey, England
- Died: 9 November 1892 (aged 79) Wakefield, New Zealand
- Party: Independent
- Spouse: Mary Ann Hern
- Children: 12, including Henry Baigent

Edward Baigent (22 June 1813 – 9 November 1892) was a 19th-century New Zealand politician. He served two terms as a member of Parliament from Nelson, New Zealand, and is regarded as one of the most successful saw-millers of the region; his company existed for well over 100 years.

== Family ==
Edward Baigent was born in 1813 in Windlesham, Surrey, England, and christened on 31 July 1814. His parents were Thomas Baigent (1782–1860) and Dorothy Ann Coule (1782–1869). Baigent was brought up as a mechanic, but afterwards engaged in farming. He married Mary Ann Hern at Windlesham, in 1833.

The Baigents and their five children emigrated to Nelson on the Clifford in May 1842; he was thus one of the earliest settlers in the Nelson region.

His son Joseph was born three days after their arrival in the colony and he was only the seventh child to be born in Nelson. His next son, Henry Baigent, later became Mayor of Nelson. After Henry, the Baigents had four more children; eleven in total.

They lived in Nelson at first, but settled in Wakefield in 1844. When Baigent first went to the Wakefield area, he reputedly spent the first night sleeping under a large tōtara tree, the 'Baigent sleeping tree', in what is now Wakefield Recreation Reserve adjacent to State Highway 6. The site is marked with a plaque and his descendants planted a Totara tree there in 1992, 100 years after Baigent's death. Nearby where Eighty Eight Valley Stream flows into the Wai-iti River, the 1.2 hectare Edward Wakefield Reserve was created in 2000. The land was donated to the District Council with a stipulation that overnight camping be allowed.

Mary Ann Baigent began providing school education at their home in Wakefield in mid-1843, but the school moved to a cob house in November of that year. On 1 January 1844, the new school was officially opened, making Wakefield School the oldest continuous school in New Zealand. In 1846 he was instrumental in the construction of St John's Church in Wakefield.

== Professional life ==
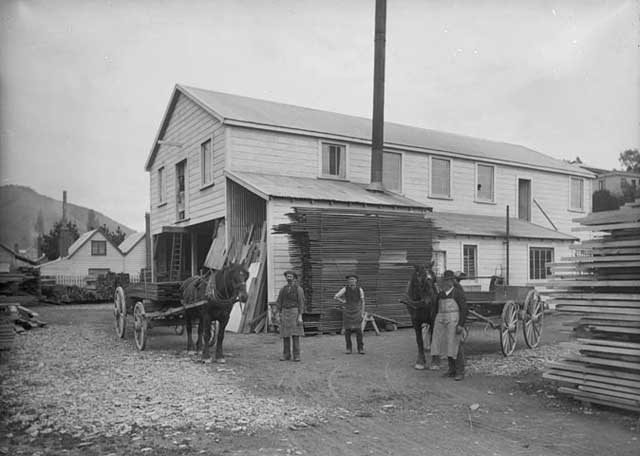
Baigent's Timber Yard

In 1844, Baigent built a water race on the Wai-iti River and a water wheel drove a flour-mill. In 1845, he added a saw-milling plant, and the timber was rafted down the Wai-iti River to the nearest road. Baigent had to work for the New Zealand Company to finance his business expansion, so he worked on his sawmill at night after his paid labour job. By 1850, there were eight men in his employment.

Baigent supplied the timber for Nelson's original cathedral in 1850/51. In 1869, he opened his first timber yard in Nelson. A year later, the yard moved to Waimea Street (later renamed Rutherford Street), where it remained for over a century. Baigent was one of the most successful saw-millers in the region and his company, known as 'H. Baigent and Sons' (where the H stands for Henry, his son) was held by the family for generations.

== Politics ==
New Zealand Parliament
Years	Term	Electorate	Party
1867–1870	4th	Waimea	Independent
1876–1879	6th	Waimea	Independent

Baigent came first in the inaugural 1853 election to the Waimea South electorate for one of two positions on the Nelson Provincial Council. He was a member for Waimea South on the Provincial Council for the entire length of its existence, and was also on the Waimea Road Board. He took a prominent part in educational matters.

Arthur Robert Oliver resigned from the Waimea electorate in 1867 and triggered a by-election. On nomination day on 24 June 1867, three candidates were put forward: Fedor Kelling (who had already represented the Waimea electorate in Parliament), Joseph Shephard, and Edward Baigent. The latter informed the voters that he did not think himself qualified to represent them in Parliament, but he would "at least give them an honest vote" (in the House). The returning officer declared a show of hands to be in favour of Baigent, Kelly then demanded a poll, and the date for this was set for Friday, 28 June 1867. On election day, Baigent, Shephard and Kelling received 99, 71 and 32 votes, respectively, and Baigent was thus declared elected. He represented the electorate until the end of the term in 1870.

The next general election was held on 13 February 1871 in the Waimea electorate, and it was contested by Baigent and Shephard. Shephard won by 149 to 91 votes.

At the nomination meeting on 22 December 1875 for the next general election, Baigent and Shephard were proposed, with the show of hands in favour of Baigent. The interest in the election on 7 January 1876 was low, with a voter turnout of less than half. Baigent was elected with 88 votes to 76, and represented the electorate until the end of the parliamentary term in 1879, when he retired. He was succeeded by Shephard, who was elected unopposed.

== Death ==
Baigent's wife died on 3 November 1892. Baigent himself died less than a week after her, on 9 November 1892 in Wakefield, aged 79. He was buried there three days later.

== Notes ==
New Zealand Parliament
Preceded by Arthur Robert Oliver	Member of Parliament for Waimea; 1867–1870; 1876–1879	Succeeded by Joseph Shephard
Preceded by Joseph Shephard	Member of Parliament for Waimea; 1867–1870; 1876–1879	Succeeded by Joseph Shephard
