= David Monro (New Zealand politician) =

New Zealand politician (1813–1877)

The Honourable Sir David Monro
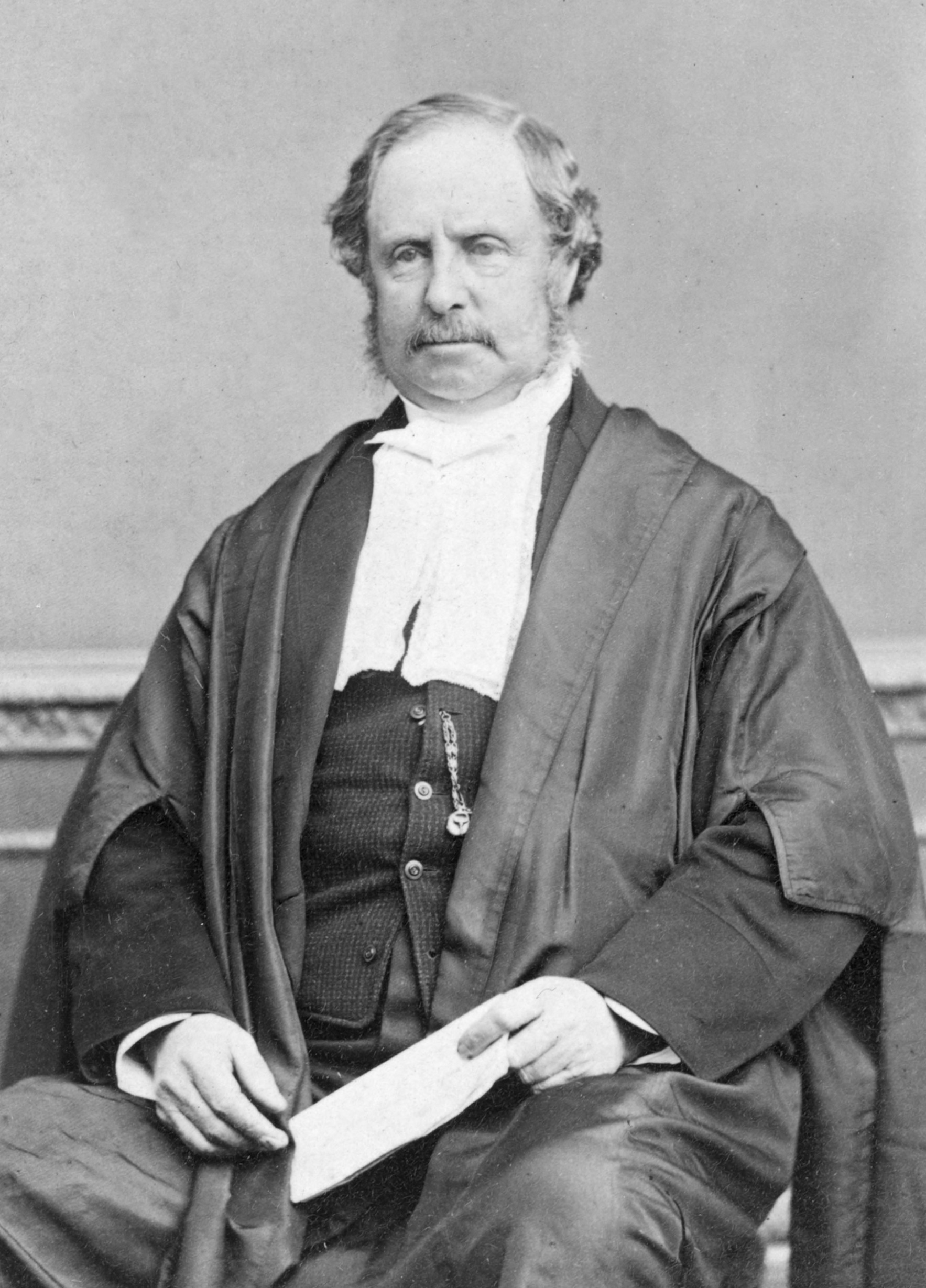
- Sir David Monro, c. 1873

2nd Speaker of the House of Representatives
- In office 1861–1870
- Preceded by: Charles Clifford
- Succeeded by: Dillon Bell

Personal details
- Born: 27 March 1813 Edinburgh, Scotland
- Died: 15 February 1877 (aged 63) Nelson, New Zealand
- Spouse: Dinah Secker
- Relations: Alexander Monro (father); Alexander Monro (grandfather); Alexander Monro (great-grandfather); Charles Monro (son); James Hector (son-in-law)
- Profession: Doctor, politician

Sir David Monro (27 March 1813 – 15 February 1877) was a New Zealand politician. He served as Speaker of the New Zealand House of Representatives from 1861 to 1870.

== Early life ==
Monro was born in Edinburgh. His father was Alexander Monro, a lecturer at the Edinburgh Medical College. Monro was from a long line of doctors, the Monro of Fyrish family that was a branch of clan Munro. He graduated as a Doctor of Medicine from his father's college in 1835. After first studying for a time in Paris, Berlin and Vienna, Monro established a medical practice in Edinburgh. In 1841, however, Monro bought land in the planned settlement at Nelson, New Zealand. He arrived in Nelson the following year.

Monro married Dinah Secker on 7 May 1845 and they had five sons and two daughters, including Charles Monro, who introduced rugby union to New Zealand, and Maria Georgiana Monro, who married the Scottish geologist, naturalist, and surgeon James Hector.

== Political career ==
In 1843, following the Wairau Affray, Monro was chosen (along with Alfred Domett, later to become Premier) to present the Nelson settlers' views to Willoughby Shortland, the acting Governor. Partly as a result of this attention, Monro was appointed to the Legislative Council of the New Munster Province in 1849, but resigned after a dispute with Governor George Grey.

New Zealand Parliament
Years	Term	Electorate	Party
1853–1855	1st	Waimea	Independent
1858–1860	2nd	Waimea	Independent
1861–1866	3rd	Picton	Independent
1866–1870	4th	Cheviot	Independent
1871	5th	Motueka	Independent
1872–1873	5th	Waikouaiti	Independent

In 1853, Monro was elected to the 1st New Zealand Parliament, representing the seat of Waimea. He was re-elected in the same seat for the 2nd Parliament in 1858. At the beginning of the 3rd Parliament, to which Monro had been elected as representative of Picton, he was selected as Speaker. He is generally regarded as having conducted this duty "with dignity", although his use of the Speaker's casting vote to unseat Premier William Fox in 1862 was controversial. At the 1866 general election, he successfully contested the Cheviot electorate and declared elected unopposed. Monro remained Speaker until 1870, when he announced that he would step down. William Fox, who was once again Premier, failed to move the traditional vote of thanks.

Monro contested the Motueka seat in the 1871 elections, and was declared elected. A subsequent petition, however, overturned this result. The committee that made the ruling had a government majority, and some of its findings have been deemed "legally dubious" – many believe that the decision was taken for political reasons. Furthermore, a proposal to appoint Monro to the Legislative Council was blocked by Fox. Monro nevertheless succeeded in re-entering Parliament through a 1872 by-election in Waikouaiti. After the Fox government had been defeated, Monro resigned in 1873.

== Life outside politics ==
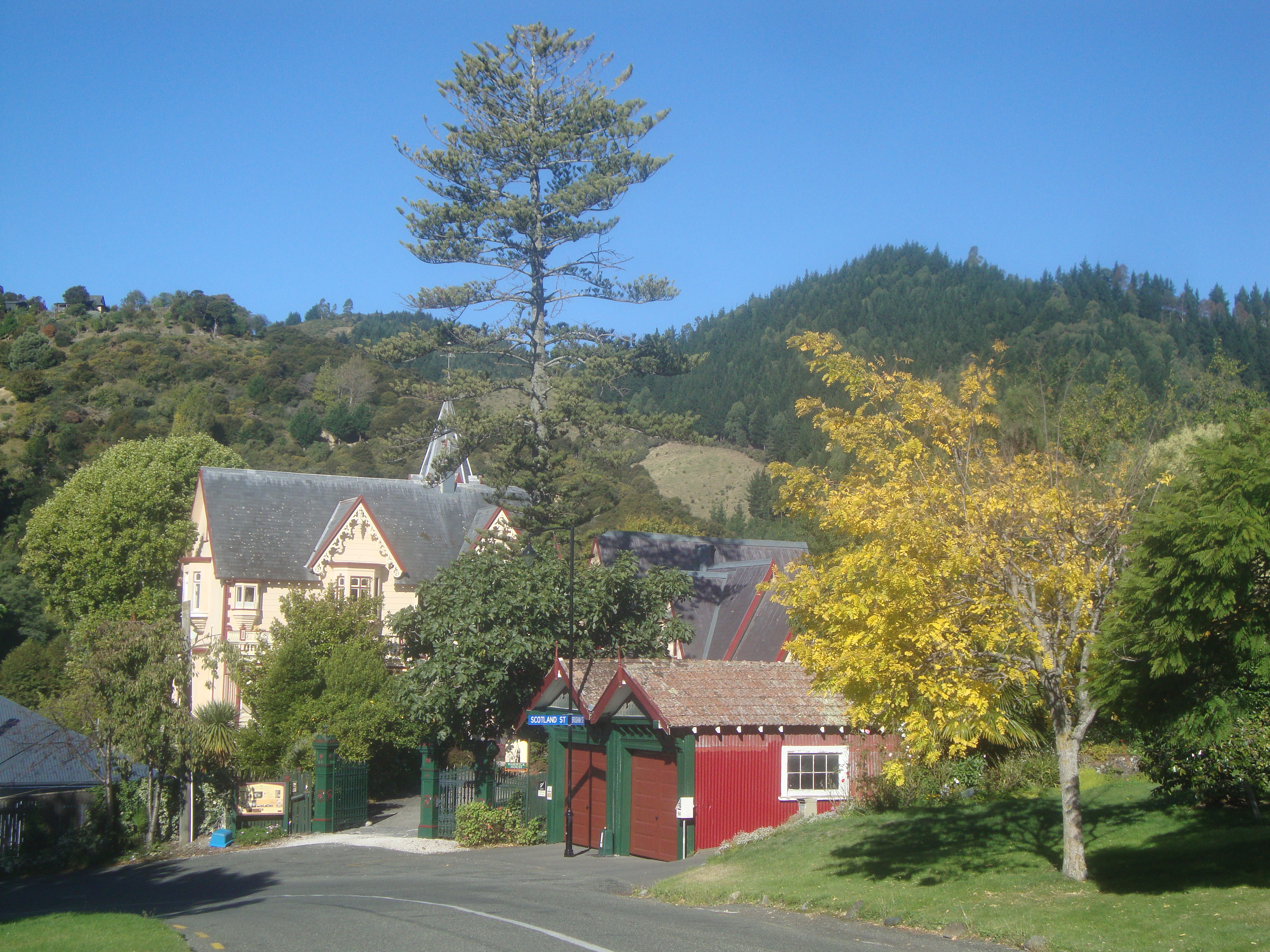
Warwick House as seen from Brougham Street

For some time, Monro leased Warwick House, at the time known as Sunnyside. The house was built for Arthur Fell (father of Charles Fell) in 1854 by builder David Goodall. When Fell returned to England, Monro leased the house. Later, the house was bought by Nathaniel Edwards. The building at 64 Brougham Street in Nelson is one of the finest and largest examples of early Victorian Gothic Revivalism still remaining in New Zealand. At one time, the house had about 50 rooms. The building was registered on 25 November 1982 as Category II with Heritage New Zealand, with registration number 1618.

Monro was knighted in 1866. He died at his home, Newstead (now known as Renwick House), in Nelson, New Zealand, on 15 February 1877.

The perennial herb endemic to New Zealand Myosotis monroi and the species of speargrass Aciphylla monroi are named after him.

== See also ==
- Munro of Auchinbowie, the distinguished Scottish family that David Monro was descended from.

== Sources ==
- Hamilton, John Andrew (1894). "Monro, David" . In Lee, Sidney (ed.). Dictionary of National Biography. Vol. 38. London: Smith, Elder & Co.
- "The Monros of Auchinbowie and Cognate Families". By John Alexander Inglis. Edinburgh. Printed privately by T and A Constable. Printers to His Majesty. 1911.

Political offices
Preceded by Charles Clifford	Speaker of the New Zealand House of Representatives; 1861–1870	Succeeded by Dillon Bell
New Zealand Parliament
New constituency	Member of Parliament for Waimea; 1853–1855 alongside William Cautley, William Travers; 1858–1860 alongside William Travers, Fedor Kelling	Succeeded by Charles Elliott
Preceded by Charles Elliott	Member of Parliament for Waimea; 1853–1855 alongside William Cautley, William Travers; 1858–1860 alongside William Travers, Fedor Kelling	Succeeded by Alfred Saunders
New constituency	Member of Parliament for Picton; 1861–1866	Succeeded by Arthur Beauchamp
Preceded by Frederick Weld	Member of Parliament for Cheviot; 1866–1870	Succeeded by Henry Ingles
Preceded by Charles Parker	Member of Parliament for Motueka; 1871	Succeeded by Charles Parker
