= Mary Müller =

Mary Ann Müller
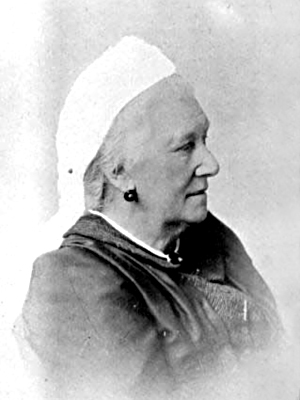
- Mary Ann Müller in 1900
- Born: Mary Ann Wilson; 22 September 1820; London, England
- Died: 18 July 1901 (aged 80); Blenheim, New Zealand
- Other names: Fémmina
- Occupations: Writer, Suffragist

Mary Ann Müller (née Wilson and then Griffiths; 22 September 1820 – 18 July 1901) was a New Zealand campaigner for women's suffrage and, more generally, women's rights. She is described by the Dictionary of New Zealand Biography as "New Zealand's pioneer suffragist".

== Life ==
Müller was born in London on the 22 September 1820. Little is known about the background of her mother, Mary Cott. Her father, James Norris, was an insurance and stock broker. Her parents never legally married each other. Cott provided the last name Wilson on official records for Müller and her sisters.

She moved to New Zealand with her two sons in 1849. It is uncertain whether she was a widow or whether she had left her husband on account of his cruelty. She worked for two years as a teacher in Nelson and married her second husband, Stephen Lunn Müller, a surgeon and a fellow immigrant from Britain, there in 1851. Her first husband is known to have been dead by this point.

In 1864, she met British women's rights advocate Maria Rye, who was visiting New Zealand. Müller began to closely follow feminist movements in Britain and the United States. She also began to write articles on the topic of women's rights, which her friend Charles Elliott, the editor of the Nelson Examiner, published in his newspaper. Müller wrote under the pen name "Fémmina", primarily because her husband, a local politician, objected to her views.

In 1869, still under a pseudonym, she wrote An appeal to the men of New Zealand, the first pamphlet on the issue of women's suffrage to be published in New Zealand. Müller's argument was that it was necessary for women to obtain the vote in order for them to contribute fully to the progress of the nation. She also asked for the repeal of discriminatory legislation, and appealed to men – particularly members of Parliament – to take up the cause of women's suffrage. Her pamphlet "created considerable interest both in New Zealand and abroad". She received a letter of support and congratulations from John Stuart Mill. Unwilling, because of her husband's position, to become a public activist, Müller nonetheless met William Fox in private to discuss her views. According to the Brooklyn Museum, "the Married Women's Property Act of 1870 incorporated many of her ideas".

She revealed her identity only in 1898, seven years after her husband's death. She died in Blenheim on 18 July 1901 and was interred at the Omaka Cemetery.

== See also ==
- Kate Sheppard
- List of suffragists and suffragettes
- Timeline of women's suffrage
- Women's suffrage in New Zealand
