= 1867 City of Christchurch by-election =

New Zealand by-election

The 1867 City of Christchurch by-election was a by-election held on 13 February 1867 during the 4th New Zealand Parliament in the Christchurch electorate of Christchurch.

The by-election was caused by the resignation of the incumbent MP James FitzGerald on 3 January 1867.

The by-election was won by William Travers.

== Results ==
1867 City of Christchurch by-election
Party	Candidate	Votes	%	±%
Independent	William Travers	384	56.14	
Independent	Henry Tancred	300	43.86	
Turnout		684		
Majority		84	12.28	
