= Cheviot (New Zealand electorate) =

Cheviot was a parliamentary electorate in the Canterbury region of New Zealand, from 1858 to 1890. It was named after what was then one of the country's largest sheep stations, Cheviot Hills.

== Population centres ==
The initial 24 New Zealand electorates were defined by Governor George Grey in March 1853, based on the New Zealand Constitution Act 1852 that had been passed by the British government. The Constitution Act also allowed the House of Representatives to establish new electorates, and this was first done in 1858, when four new electorates were formed by splitting existing electorates. Cheviot was one of those four electorates, and it was established in areas that previously belonged to the Wairau and Christchurch Country electorates.

The Cheviot electorate was entirely rural. The returning officer, Leslie Lee, decided on two polling stations for the first election in December 1859, and they were both sheep stations of runholders: Robinson's station Cheviot Hills, and Mason's Old Station at Waituhi Creek.

== History ==
The first election in the Cheviot electorate was held on 18 December 1859, which was partway through the term of the 2nd New Zealand Parliament. Edward Jollie was the first representative. Charles Hunter Brown announced his candidacy for the 1 March 1861 election long before the election date was set. Frederick Weld was narrowly defeated in the 15 February 1861 election in the Wairau electorate and subsequently became a candidate in Cheviot, where he defeated Brown. In the 1866 election, David Monro was declared elected unopposed.

Leonard Harper was the only representative who did not serve through his whole term – he resigned on 2 April 1878. The subsequent 1878 by-election, held on 27 May, was won by Alfred Saunders.

The electorate was abolished in 1890.

=== Election results ===
The electorate was represented by eight Members of Parliament:

Key

Independent

Election	Winner
1859 supplementary election	Edward Jollie
1861 election	Frederick Weld
1866 election	David Monro
1871 election	Henry Ingles
1876 election	Leonard Harper
1878 by-election	Alfred Saunders
1879 election	Alfred Saunders
1881 election	Hugh McIlraith
1884 election	James Dupré Lance
1887 election	James Dupré Lance

== Election results ==
=== 1878 by-election ===
1878 Cheviot by-election
Party	Candidate	Votes	%	±%
Independent	Alfred Saunders	94	57.67	
Independent	Henry Ingles	69	42.33	
Turnout		163		
Majority		25	15.34	

=== 1861 election ===
1861 general election: Cheviot
Party	Candidate	Votes	%	±%
Independent	Frederick Weld	24	77.42	
Independent	Charles Hunter Brown	7	22.58	
Majority		17	54.84	
Turnout		31	15.82	
Registered electors		196		

== See also ==
- History and naming of the town of Cheviot
