= John George Miles =

New Zealand politician (1838–1884)

New Zealand Parliament
Years	Term	Electorate	Party
1864–1866	3rd	Waimea	Independent

John George Miles (17 Jan 1838 – 20 December 1884) was a 19th-century Member of Parliament in Nelson, New Zealand.

Miles was born in 1838 in Finsbury, London, the son of John Hamilton Miles and Mary Smith. He arrived in Nelson, New Zealand around 1853 and farmed near the town. He married Alice Harriott Smith on 20 September 1860 at Spring Grove (located between Brightwater and Wakefield), Waimea, New Zealand. Their son Bramston Hamilton Miles was born on 22 February 1863, but his wife died three weeks later from childbirth complications on 14 March.

He represented the Waimea electorate from 1864 to January 1866, when he retired. The 1865 parliamentary session had already finished on 30 October, and in early December, Miles addressed a public meeting reviewing his term as the electorate's representative, and saying goodbye to his constituents, as he planned to spend the next two years in England. He offered to be their representative again upon his return. He had promised his dying wife to take their son to England, so that he could be brought up by her parents and siblings.

Miles and his son left the country on the Asterope for England on 29 December 1865 from Wellington. Miles returned to New Zealand on the Electra, which arrived in Wellington on 22 October 1867, and continued to Nelson on the Rangitoto.

He moved to Melbourne, Victoria, where in January 1872, he was secretary pro tem of the newly established South Melbourne Gas Company. On 18 May 1872, he married Maria Matilda Downer at St James Cathedral. They had a son, Charles Henry Valentine Miles, the following year, but he died on 11 March 1874 aged 13 months; at the time, the family was living at Emerald Hill. By 1877, he was an accountant, land, and commission agent. In March 1883, Miles was appointed secretary at the Austin Hospital for Incurables; by then, they were living in Prahran. Miles died at Prahran on 20 December 1884. He was a fellow of the Royal Geographical Society.

== Notes ==
New Zealand Parliament
Preceded by Alfred Saunders	Member of Parliament for Waimea; 1864–1866	Succeeded by Arthur Robert Oliver
