= 1877 City of Wellington by-election =

New Zealand by-election

The 1877 City of Wellington by-election was a by-election held in the multi-member City of Wellington electorate during the 6th New Zealand Parliament, on 27 March 1877.

The by-election was caused by the resignation of one of the two incumbent MPs, Edward Pearce, and led to his replacement by William Travers.

== Results ==
1877 City of Wellington by-election
Party	Candidate	Votes	%	±%
Independent	William Travers	572	50.00	
Independent	William Hutchison	557	48.69	
Majority		15	1.31	
Informal votes				
Turnout		1129		
Registered electors				
