= 1864 Waimea by-election =

New Zealand by-election

The 1864 Waimea by-election was a by-election held on 29 November 1864 in the Waimea electorate during the 3rd New Zealand Parliament.

The by-election was caused by the resignation of the incumbent MP Alfred Saunders on 31 October 1864.

The by-election was won by John George Miles.

== Results ==
1864 Waimea by-election
Party	Candidate	Votes	%	±%
Independent	John George Miles	88	53.01	
Independent	Fedor Kelling	78	46.99	
Turnout		166		
Majority		10	6.02	
