= Edward Jollie =

New Zealand politician and surveyor (1825–1894)

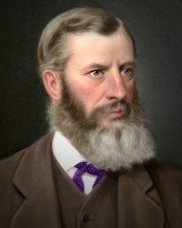
- Edward Jollie

Member of the New Zealand Parliament for Cheviot
- In office 1859–1860

Personal details
- Born: 1 September 1825
- Died: 7 August 1894 (aged 68)
- Spouse: Caroline Orsmond Jollie
- Relations: Francis Jollie (brother)
- Occupation: Surveyor

Edward Jollie (1 September 1825 – 7 August 1894) was a pioneer land surveyor in New Zealand, initially as a cadet surveyor with the New Zealand Company. The Christchurch Central City is laid out to his survey.

== Biography ==
New Zealand Parliament
Years	Term	Electorate	Party
1859–1860	2nd	Cheviot	Independent

Jollie was born in 1825. The family was from Brampton, Carlisle, England. His father was the Reverend Francis Jollie, and he was the fourth son. He followed his elder brother Francis to New Zealand, arriving on the barque Brougham in Wellington in 1842. Later he worked in the Wairau, and in Canterbury, where he laid out the new town of Christchurch in 1850.

Later he was briefly the first Member of Parliament for the Cheviot electorate 1859–1860, being elected in December 1859. In his diary, he says about his parliamentary career that "In the Assembly I voted with the Government, but only spoke once in a debate, and then briefly."

He farmed in Southbridge, Canterbury. He was active on the Canterbury Provincial Council from 1865 until the abolition of the provinces in 1876. He held several posts including Secretary of Public Works and Provincial Treasurer.

He lived with his wife, Caroline, six daughters and two sons in Europe from 1877 and when they returned to New Zealand in 1884 settled in Pātea. His wife encouraged him to write an autobiography for the benefit of their children, and he began writing his reminiscences in 1872.

Although he had no connection with Otago, Jollie is commemorated in the name of a street in Mosgiel. Jollie Street in Linwood is named after him.

== Bibliography ==
- "Index". Edward Jollie – Reminisces 1841–1865. Wellington: Alexander Turnbull Library. 1880.

New Zealand Parliament
New constituency	Member of Parliament for Cheviot; 1859–1860	Succeeded by Frederick Weld
