= Samuel Stephens (New Zealand politician) =

New Zealand politician and surveyor (1811–1855)

Member of the New Zealand Parliament for Town of Nelson
- In office 17 June 1854 – 26 June 1855

Personal details
- Born: 26 January 1803 Bridport, Dorset, England
- Died: 26 June 1855 (aged 52) Nelson, New Zealand
- Party: Independent

Samuel Stephens (26 January 1803 – 26 June 1855) was a 19th-century surveyor and New Zealand politician. He was the first member of the New Zealand Parliament to die in office.

== Biography ==
Stephens was born on 26 January 1803 in Bridport, Dorset, England. On 5 February 1838, he married Sarah Bennett (born 1812) in Shaftesbury. They came to New Zealand, with him as First Chief Assistant of the surveying staff to Frederick Tuckett on the New Zealand Company Nelson Preliminary Expedition in September 1841. They arrived near present-day Motueka on 9 October 1841 on the Whitby.

The New Zealand Governor Captain Hobson had told the New Zealand Company that it could only found a settlement in the vicinity of Blind Bay in accordance with an agreement reached with local Maori. On 9 October Captain Wakefield, Tuckett, Stephens, and their guide a Mr Moore landed at Kaiteriteri and discussed possible alternative locations with the local Maori. Apparently the local Maori omitted to mention Nelson haven as they wanted the settlement constructed near their pā site. It was another two weeks before the New Zealand Company discovered Nelson haven and a further week before Wakefield decided to make it the place of settlement (either late September or early October 1841).

Stephens assisted in surveying Nelson's town acres, as well as the Tākaka and Aorere valleys. For much of his time in the Province he lived at Riwaka. His neighbours were a native couple, Mary and Etani, who were on friendly terms with his family. In January 1843 he noted: "Oh! How do I blush for my countrymen, when I write that our fears for the safety of ourselves and property are not from the natives, but from the gangs of bad white men who now infest the country."

He was appointed a magistrate in Motueka in 1843. Stephens resigned in 1844 to take the place of Chief Surveyor for the District when Tuckett resigned. During his time in Nelson Stephens kept meteorological records and provided 11 years of these to Captain Drury RN, HMS Pandora prior to his death.

In 1845 he explored Lake Rotoiti and the Buller Valley, constructed a water-powered flour mill and surveyed a demarcation line between disputed lands at Wakapuaka. But in mid-1845 Stephens suffered from an outbreak of abscesses and ulcers, which were to plague him for the rest of his life. In 1848 he wrote to his sister saying that his ‘miserable affliction' had left him a mental and physical wreck and that he had been unable to walk without great pain for nearly three years. The affliction stopped him working as a surveyor. In the summers between 1848 and 1853 Stephens and his wife lived at a beach camp at Stephens Bay, Kaiteriteri.

New Zealand Parliament
Years	Term	Electorate	Party
1854–1855	1st	Town of Nelson	Independent

Since 19 August 1853, Stephens represented the Motueka and Massacre Bay electorate on the Nelson Provincial Council. He became the Member of Parliament in the 1st Parliament for the Town of Nelson from 17 June 1854, when he replaced William Travers, who had resigned on 26 May 1854 to contest the Waimea electorate.

After a period of lingering illness he died on 26 June 1855, and the seat was left vacant until the election of the second Parliament (the election in the Nelson electorate was held on 12 November 1855). He was buried at Trafalgar Street Cemetery, which is today known as Fairfield Park adjacent to Fairfield House.

His wife Sarah sold their property and returned to England. Stephens was succeeded by Captain Edward Fearon in the Nelson Provincial Council. His position in parliament remained vacant until the general election in November 1855, when Alfred Domett and Edward Stafford were returned to fill the two available seats.

== Notes ==
New Zealand Parliament
Preceded by William Travers	Member of Parliament for Nelson; 1854–1855; Served alongside: James Mackay	Succeeded by Alfred Domett; Edward Stafford
