= James Mackay (New Zealand politician, born 1804) =

New Zealand politician

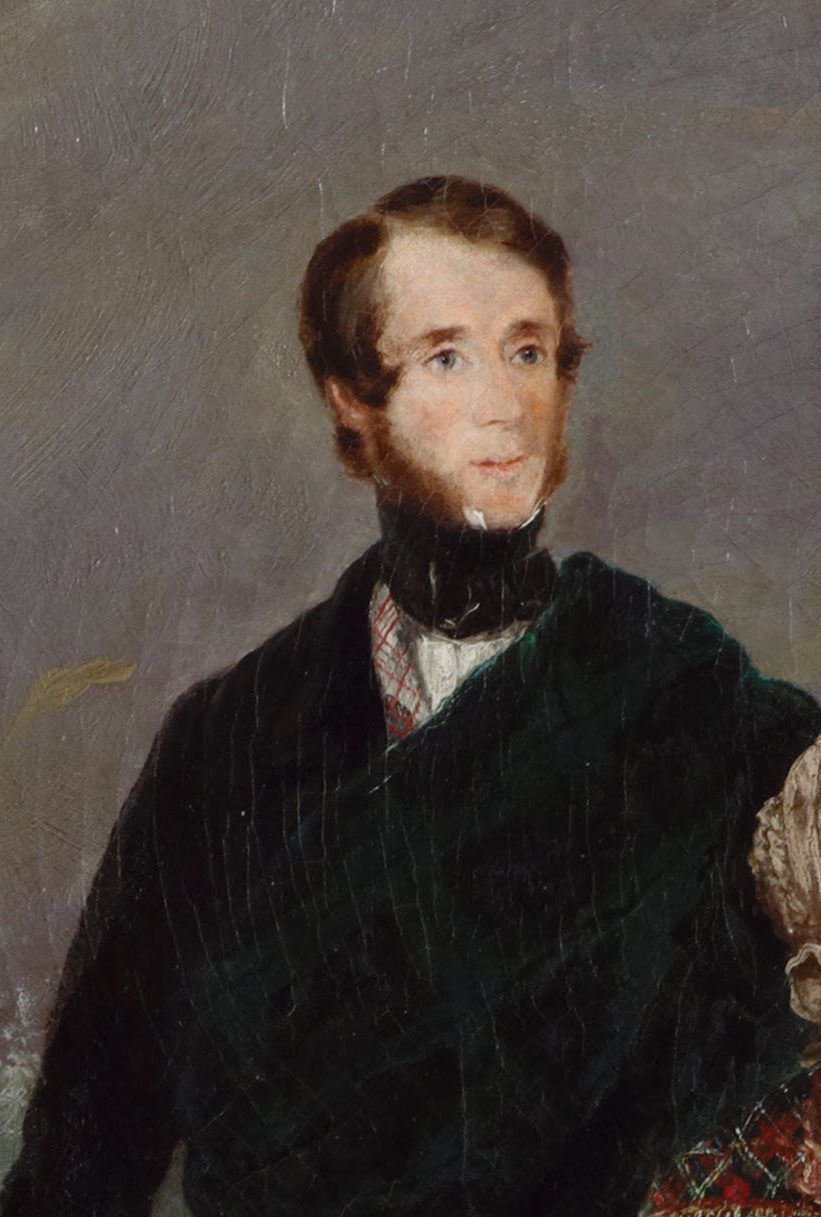

Member of the New Zealand Parliament for Town of Nelson
- In office 1853–1855

Personal details
- Born: 1804 Scotland
- Died: 29 May 1875 (aged 71) Nelson, New Zealand
- Party: Independent
- Relations: James Mackay (son)

James Mackay (1804 – 29 May 1875) was a New Zealand politician. He was a member of the 1st New Zealand Parliament. He is remembered for the incident with Henry Sewell in Parliament in 1854.

== Early life ==
James Mackay was born in 1804 in Aberdeen, Scotland, the second son of Alexander Mackie and Elspet (née Davidson). Though his father was the owner of a large shipping company in Aberdeen, James reinvented himself as being born and bred a highlander, which is a likely reason for him assuming the name Mackay.

As a young man he moved to London where he was employed as a banker, probably by Lloyds, as he remained their agent in Nelson until 1859. He had studied political economy and free trade principals under John Ramsay McCulloch, which he claimed meant that he supported all measures which had a progressive tendency. Politically, he participated in committees and actively supported liberal causes such as the passing of the Reform Bill, which gave greater suffrage to common people.

== Family and emigration to New Zealand ==
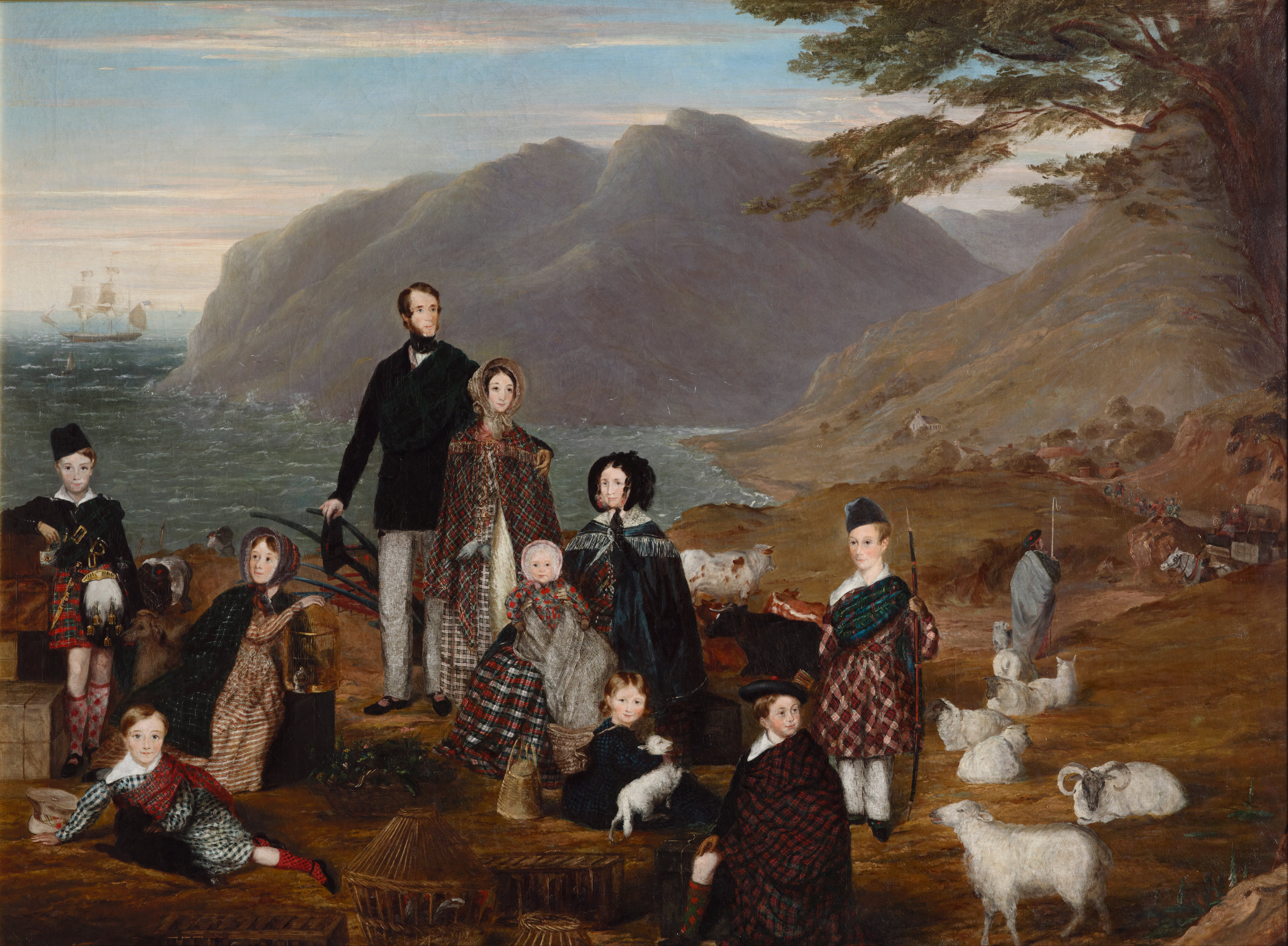
Portrait of the Mackay family by William Allsworth in 1844 prior to them emigrating to New Zealand

In about 1831, when they were both 27, Mackay married Ann Charles. From 1829 to 1848 they had eight children, the first six being born in London and the youngest two in New Zealand. They also raised two sons of his late younger brother, who were born in Edinburgh. At the end of 1844 the family embarked from London on the Slains Castle for Nelson, New Zealand. Before leaving, Mackay commissioned a painting which portrays the family as highlanders departing Scotland in tartans and travel attire, stocked with sheep, calves, poultry, ploughs and other accoutrements required for starting a new life in a distant land.

Arriving in Nelson in January 1845, Mackay established a farm in Wakapuaka, which he named Drumduan. He also had a town house, a sheep-run in the Wairau after 1847, and in 1852 he established a cattle and sheep-run in Golden Bay in conjunction with his eldest son James Mackay junior.

Mackay soon became actively involved with local affairs, joining institutions and voicing his opinion at public meetings. He joined the volunteer forces and had the rank of captain. He was also a magistrate.

== Political career ==
When representative government was established in New Zealand in 1853, he became a member of the House of Representatives for the Town of Nelson. He was also a member of the Provincial Council for the Town of Nelson from 1857 to 1861.

New Zealand Parliament
Years	Term	Electorate	Party
1853–1855	1st	Town of Nelson	Independent

In the 1st New Zealand Parliament, the Town of Nelson was a two-member electorate. On nomination day on 25 July 1853, William Travers and Mackay were the only candidates put forward. They were thus declared elected unopposed. Mackay served until the end of the first term in 1855, but did not serve in any subsequent Parliaments.

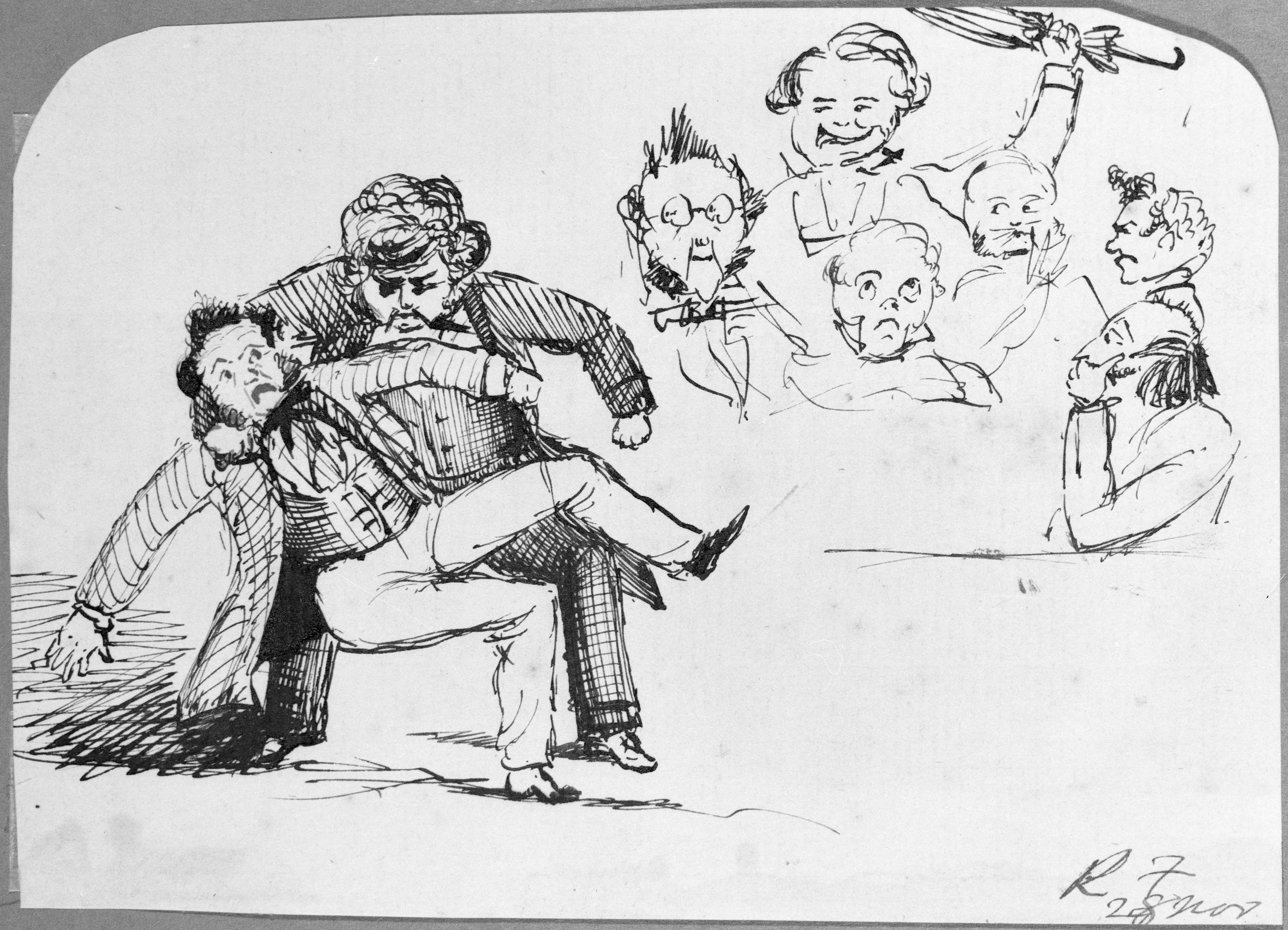
Sewell overwhelming Mackay, with Fitzherbert (hand covering mouth) looking on

Mackay is noted for his support of the Acting Governor, Robert Wynyard, who argued that it was not possible for Parliament to assume responsibility for governing New Zealand without royal assent. When Parliament disagreed, Wynyard officially prorogued it. Parliament responded by suspending its own standing orders. These orders required that messages from the Governor take precedence over other Parliamentary business.

With the standing orders overturned, Wynyard's message could remain officially "unopened" while Parliament continued to function. Mackay, part of the minority who supported Wynyard, attempted to bypass this tactic by presenting a copy of The New Zealand Gazette which contained the prorogation order, shouting "you are no House, you are prorogued!". He then attempted to disrupt the business of Parliament until Henry Sewell (later to become New Zealand's first Premier) and another MP attempted to manhandle him out of the debating chamber. Mackay managed to escape, and (in the words of a contemporary) "beat an honourable retreat over the rail into the stranger's gallery, waving defiance to his assailants with his trusty umbrella." Mackay was later found guilty of "gross and premeditated contempt of the House".

== Later life and death ==
Mackay was a close friend of the Native Secretary Donald McLean. Through his contact he assisted his eldest son, James Mackay junior, to enter Government service. James junior became an Assistant Native Secretary in 1857, and from 1859 to 1860 purchased Kaikōura and the West Coast from Māori on behalf of the General Government. In 1863 he became commissioner for the Hauraki District, in 1867 he opened the Thames district for gold mining, and in 1875 he extended the goldfield by negotiating with Māori for access to the Ohinemuri district. He also acted as a general trouble shooter for the Government during times of conflict with the Māori of the North Island.

The eldest of the two nephews raised by Mackay, Alexander, also entered Government service. He was appointed commissioner of Native Reserves (firstly for the South Island then for the entire country), commissioner of the South Island Native District, and returning officer for the Southern Maori electoral seat for the House of Representatives. Most notably, from 1884 until he retired in 1902 he was a judge for the Native Land Court.

Mackay's wife Anne died in 1860 at the age of 56. In 1862 he married Ann Adney Shuckburgh, who was 20 years his junior. They had two daughters, born in 1863 and 1864. He spent his later years farming, and though still taking an active interest in local politics, he was reluctant to re-enter public office. In early 1874 he fell from a loaded cart while working on his farm. The injury to his back, though it seemed minor at the time, grew into a tumour which eventually left him paralyzed. He died in May 1875 at the age of 71.

Mackay and his first wife are buried at St Andrew's Church in Wakapuaka. The church no longer exists, and the churchyard was designated an historic site by Waimea County Council in 1975.

== Notes ==
New Zealand Parliament
New constituency	Member of Parliament for Nelson; 1853–1855; Served alongside: William Travers, Samuel Stephens	Succeeded by Alfred Domett; Edward Stafford
