= Klütz =

Town in Mecklenburg-Vorpommern, Germany

- Town
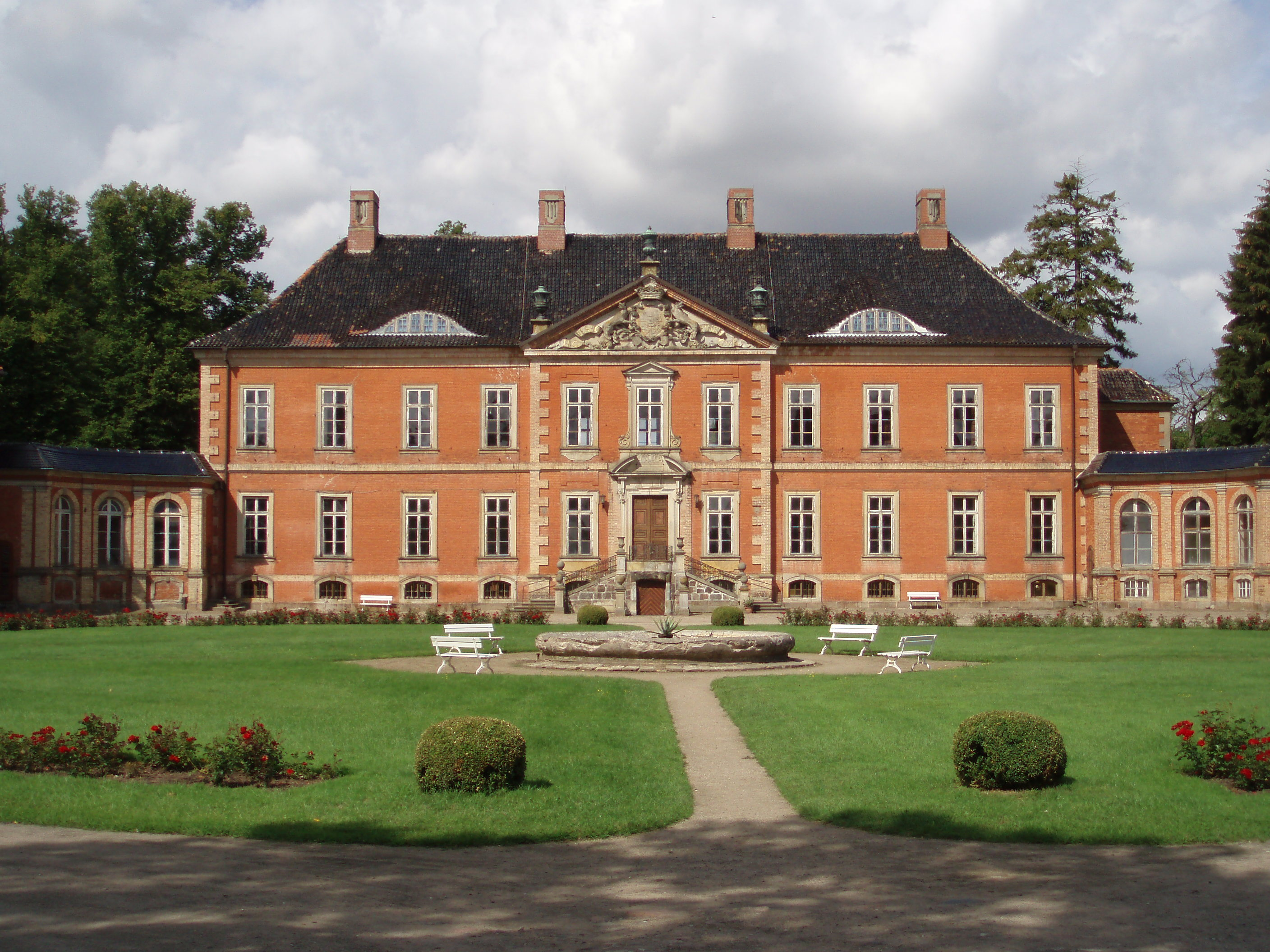
- Bothmer Castle in Klütz

- Coat of arms

- Location of Klütz within Nordwestmecklenburg district
- Interactive map of Klütz
- Location within Germany Location within Mecklenburg-Vorpommern
- Coordinates: 53°58′N 11°10′E
- Country: Germany
- State: Mecklenburg-Vorpommern
- District: Nordwestmecklenburg
- Municipal assoc.: Klützer Winkel

Government
  - Mayor: Guntram Jung

Area
  - Total: 44.41 km^{2} (17.15 sq mi)
- Elevation: 12 m (39 ft)

Population (2025-12-31)
  - Total: 3,002
  - Density: 67.60/km^{2} (175.1/sq mi)
- Time zone: UTC+01:00 (CET)
  - Summer (DST): UTC+02:00 (CEST)
- Postal codes: 23948, 23946 (Tarnewitzerhagen)
- Dialling codes: 038825
- Vehicle registration: NWM, GDB, GVM, WIS
- Website: www.kluetzer-winkel.de

Klütz (German pronunciation: [ˈklyːts]) is a town in the Nordwestmecklenburg district, in Mecklenburg-Western Pomerania, Germany. It is situated near the Baltic Sea coast, 22 km northwest of Wismar, and 33 km northeast of Lübeck. It is famous for the manor house Bothmer Castle, located just outside the village. In the centre of the village lies the medieval Brick Gothic village church, dedicated to Our Lady. There is also a centre of literature named after writer Uwe Johnson in the town.

It is close to the cities of Lübeck, Wismar and Schwerin and is part of the Hamburg Metropolitan Region.

== Notable residents ==
- Fedor Kelling (1820-1909), New Zealand politician
- Carl Friederich Christian Kelling (1818-1898), New Zealand politician
