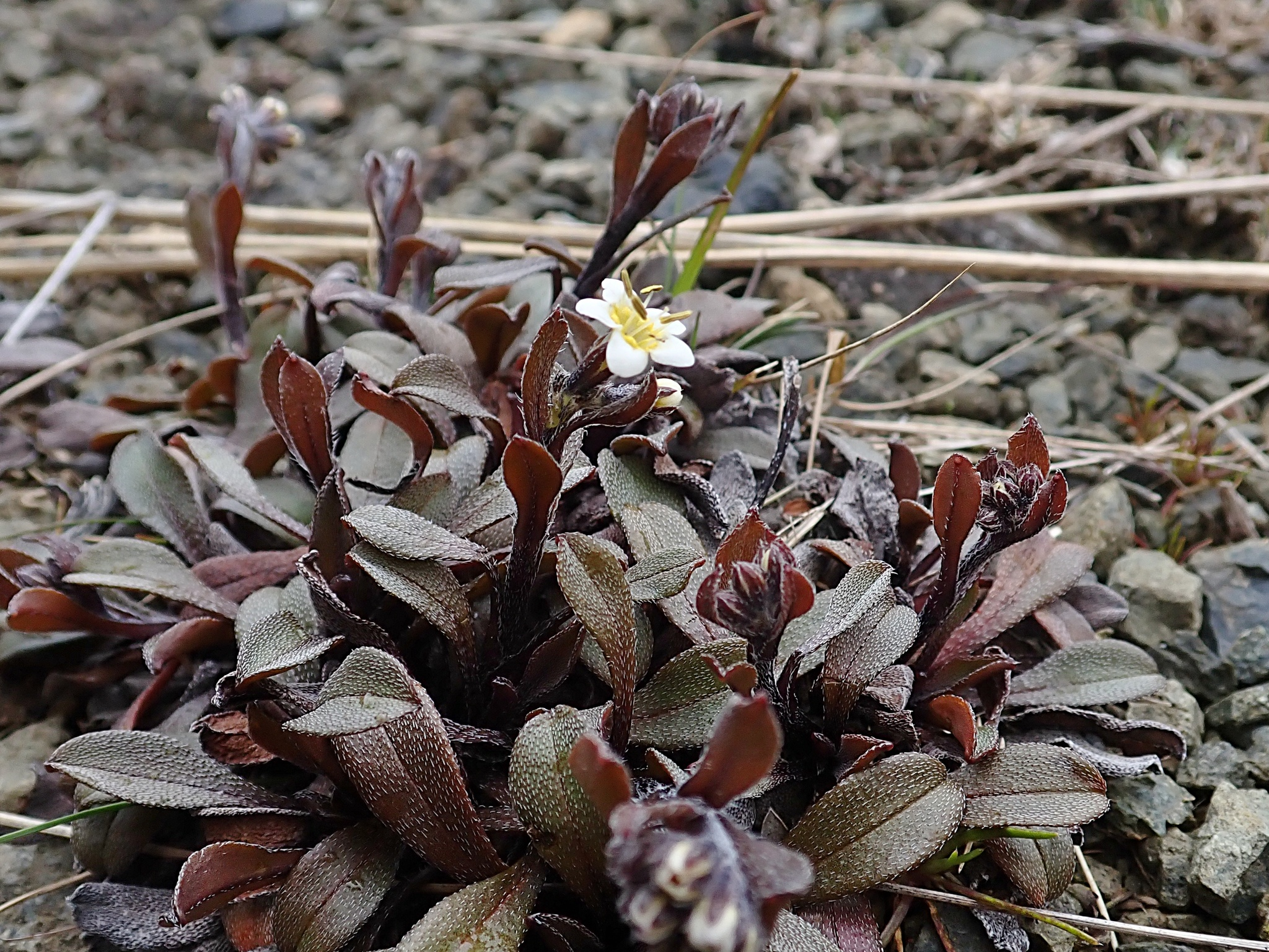
- Flowering plant of Myosotis monroi

Conservation status
- Naturally Uncommon (NZ TCS)

Scientific classification
- Kingdom: Plantae
- Clade: Tracheophytes
- Clade: Angiosperms
- Clade: Eudicots
- Clade: Asterids
- Order: Boraginales
- Family: Boraginaceae
- Genus: Myosotis
- Species: M. monroi

Binomial name
- Myosotis monroi Cheeseman, 1906

= Myosotis monroi =

Species of flowering plant

Myosotis monroi is a species of flowering plant in the family Boraginaceae endemic to the South Island of New Zealand. The species was described by Thomas Cheeseman. Plants of this species of forget-me-not are perennial and erect, and have ebracteate inflorescences with cream or white corollas.

== Taxonomy and etymology ==
Myosotis monroi Cheeseman is in the plant family Boraginaceae. It was originally described in 1906 by Thomas Cheeseman in his Manual of the New Zealand Flora. The new species was also illustrated by Matilda Smith in 1914, drawn from specimens gathered by Frederick Gibbs on Dun Mountain, Nelson, at an altitude of nearly 4,000 feet (1,220 m). Cheeseman wrote that, 'This attractive little plant was originally discovered by Sir David Monro about the year 1854 on Dun Mountain, Nelson... Monro's plant, however, has proved to be comparatively abundant on the Dun Mountain Range, and has been gathered by most New Zealand botanists...'

Myosotis monroi is morphologically most similar to two other South Island ebracteate-erect species, M. albosericea and M. goyenii, but can be distinguished from them by its hooked trichomes on the calyx, fully exserted anthers, filaments that are usually >2 mm long, and obtuse rosette leaf apex. M. monroi also shares some morphological characters with M. laeta, which is similarly restricted to the northern South Island, but can be distinguished from that species by its appressed, parallel, antrorse, straight trichomes, the inflorescence usually terminating a bifurcating, forked 'V' shape distally, a lack of retrorse trichomes at the base of the inflorescence and calyx, and a longer calyx at flowering and fruiting with lobes that are less than half the length of the calyx.

The type specimen of Myosotis monroi is lodged at the Auckland Museum (Herbarium AK).

The specific epithet, monroi, honors the Scottish settler to New Zealand, David Monro (1813–1877). Monro collected many South Island plant specimens and sent them to William J. Hooker of Kew Gardens.

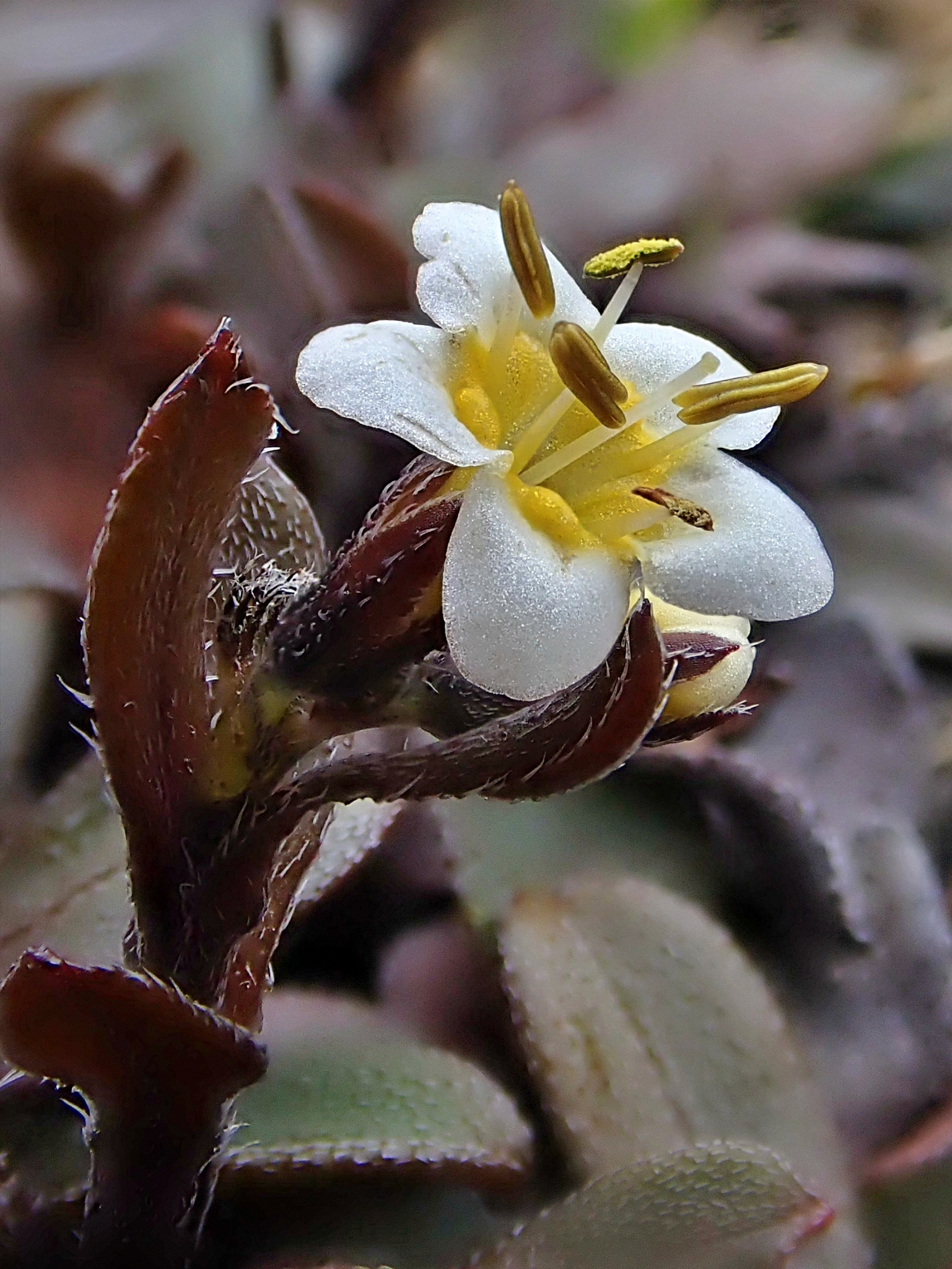
Close-up of flower

== Description ==
Myosotis monroi plants are small rosettes that often cluster together into tufts or loose clumps. The rosette leaves have petioles 3–56 mm long. The rosette leaf blades are 10–50 mm long by 4–13 mm wide (length: width ratio 1.7–5.2: 1), oblanceolate or narrowly obovate, widest at or above the middle, with an obtuse, often apiculate apex. The upper surface of the leaf is densely covered in straight, appressed, antrorse (forward-facing) hairs that are oriented parallel to the mid vein, while lower surface is usually glabrous except for a few isolated hairs. Each rosette has 1–6 erect, branched, forked, ebracteate inflorescences that are up to 22 cm long. The cauline leaves on the lower part of the inflorescence are similar to the rosette leaves, and decrease in size toward the tip. There can be up to 28 flowers in each inflorescence. Although the flowers are borne on short pedicels, they do not have bracts. The calyx is 3–6 mm long at flowering and 3–8 mm long at fruiting, lobed to about half of its length, and densely covered in short to long, forward-facing hairs, some of which are hooked. The corolla is cream or white (or yellow), 4–7 mm in diameter, with a cylindrical tube, petals that are rounded and flat, and small yellow scales alternating with the petals. The anthers are fully exserted, extending past the scales. The four smooth, shiny, black nutlets are 1.8–2.4 mm long by 1.1–1.2 mm wide and narrowly ovoid in shape.

Myosotis monroi has M. australis type pollen.

The chromosome number of M. monroi (as M. laeta) is 2n = 46.

It flowers and fruits from October to April, but the main flowering and fruiting period is November to January.

== Distribution and habitat ==
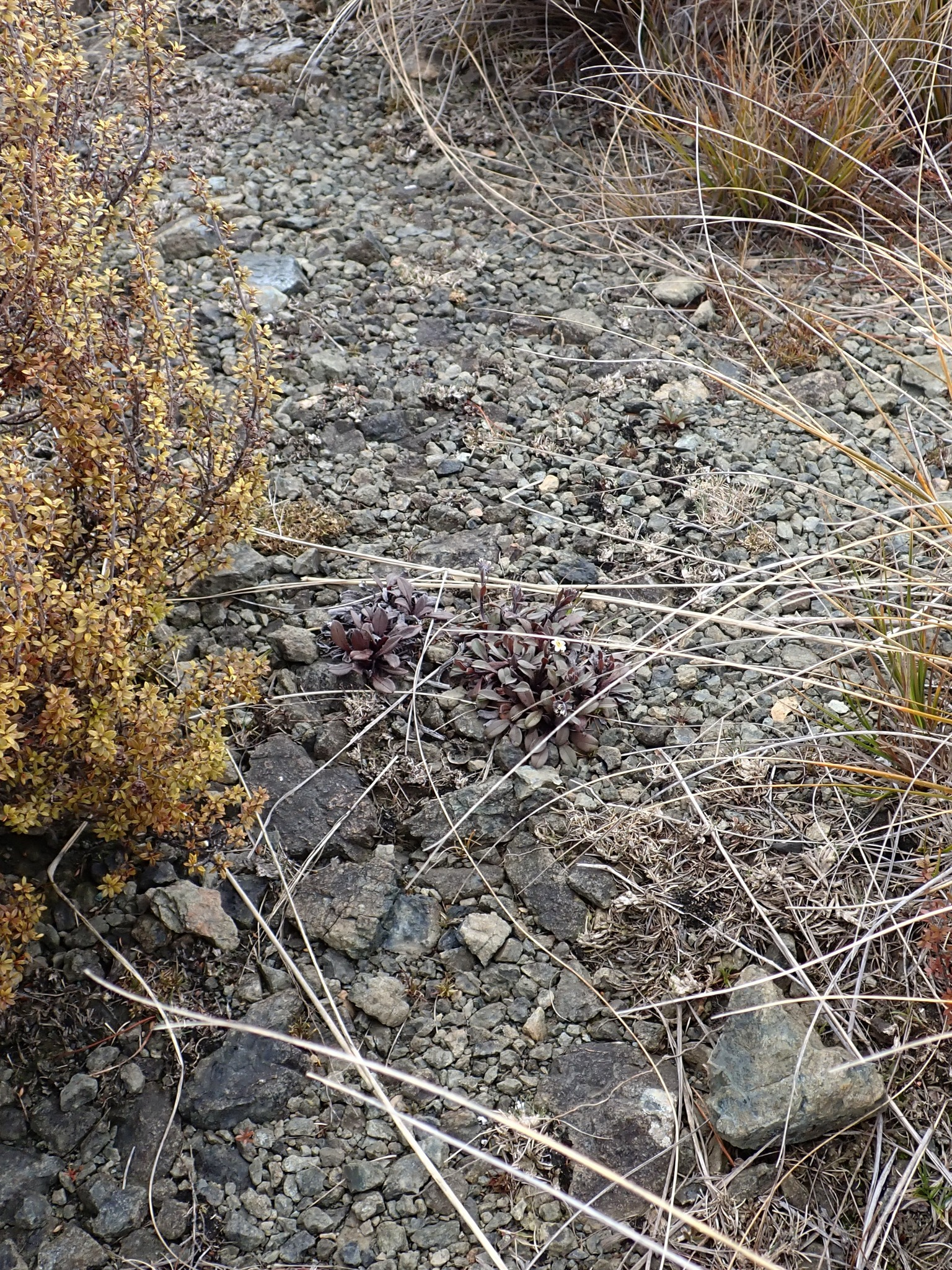
Ultramafic habitat of M. monroi

Myosotis monroi is a forget-me-not endemic to the northern part of South Island, New Zealand in the ecological provinces of Sounds-Nelson and Western Nelson, from 700–1640 m elevation. It is locally common on ultramafic soils in rocky areas in fell field, scrub or tussuckland in Red Hills, Wairau Valley, and at Dun Mountain.

== Phylogeny ==
Myosotis monroi was shown to be a part of the monophyletic southern hemisphere lineage of Myosotis in phylogenetic analyses of standard DNA sequencing markers (nuclear ribosomal DNA and chloroplast DNA regions). Within the southern hemisphere lineage, species relationships were not well resolved. The sequences of the sole individual of M. monroi included in the sampling were most similar to other northern South Island endemic species, namely M. brockiei (nuclear ribosomal DNA) and M. angustata (chloroplast DNA).

A 2025 phylogenomic study based on DNA from whole plastids, target capture of universal angiosperm bait markers, and the full nuclear ribosomal DNA cistron, included two individuals of M. monroi. In that study, M. monroi was monophyletic in the plastid and target-capture data sets or found in the same small clade in the third data set, and placed near the base of each tree. Instead of being closely related to the morphologically similar M. albosericea or M. goyenii, or to other ultramafic species, M. monroi is closely related to other nearby species, M. macrantha and M. traversii.

== Conservation status ==
The species is listed as "At Risk - Naturally Uncommon" in the most recent assessment (2023) under the New Zealand Threatened Classification system for plants, which was unchanged form the previous assessment. This species has the qualifier Range Restricted (RR) because it is restricted to a particular substrate (ultramafics) and geographic area (northern South Island).

== Gallery ==
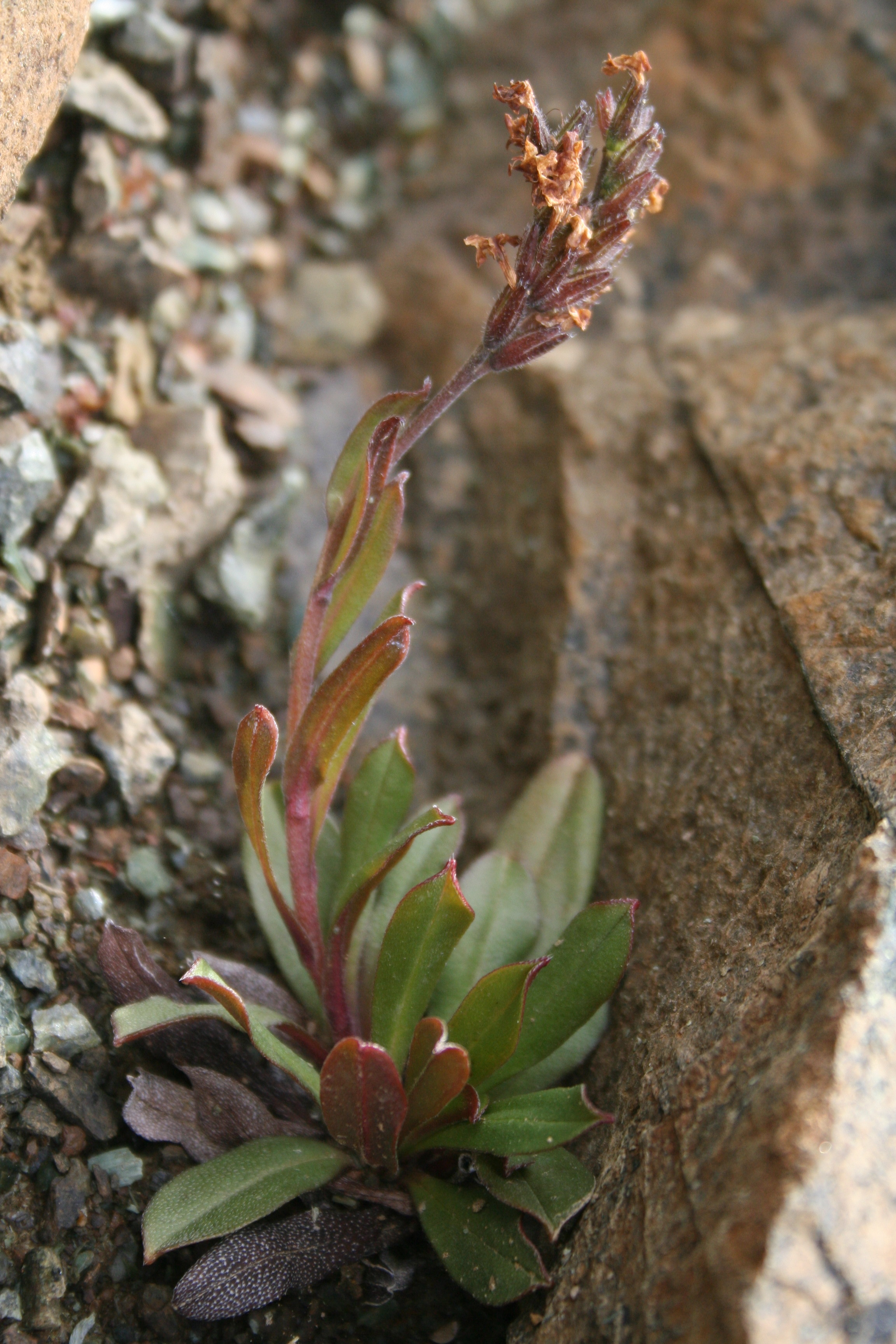
Habit of plant just past flowering

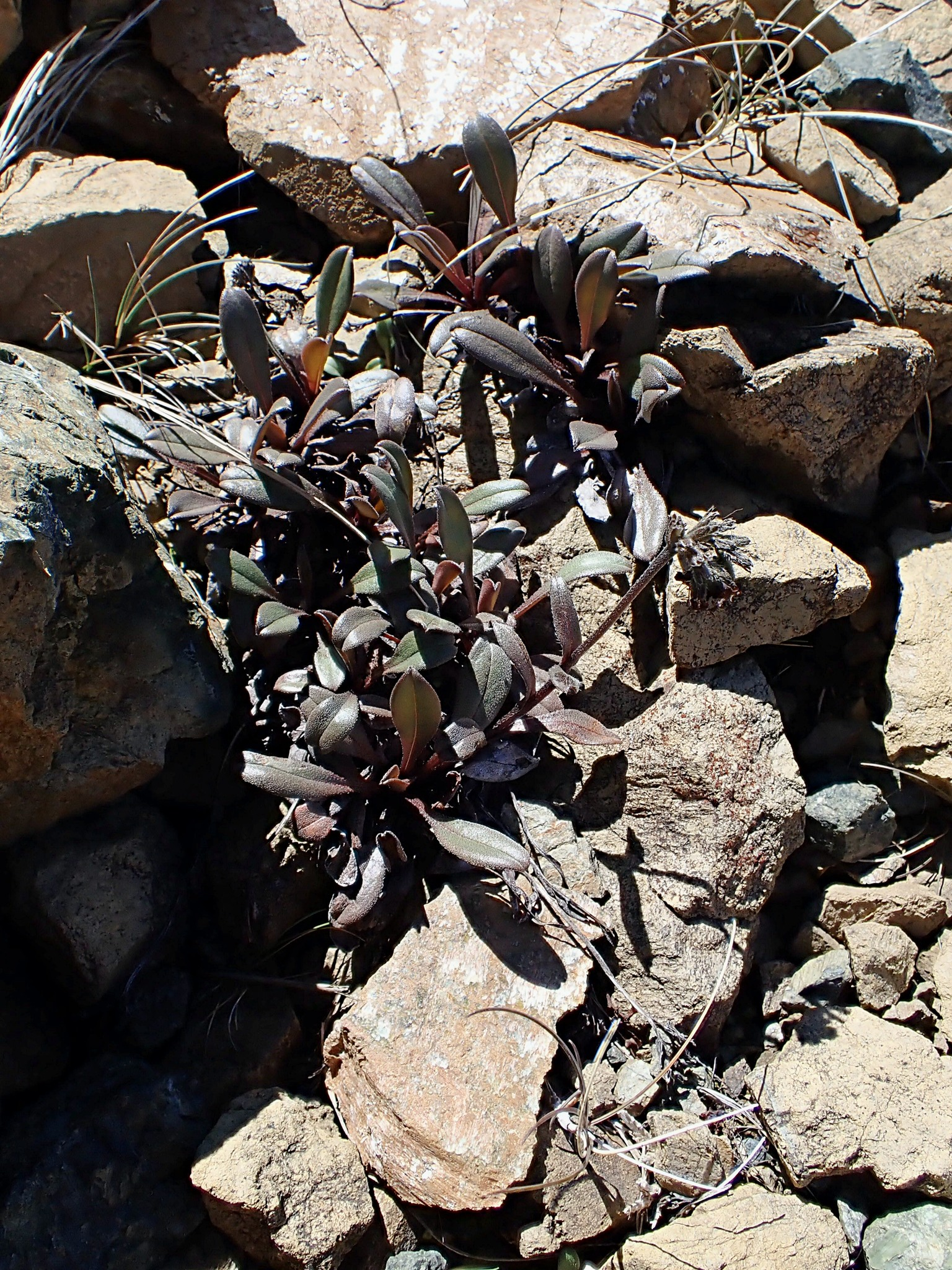
Plant in rocky habitat

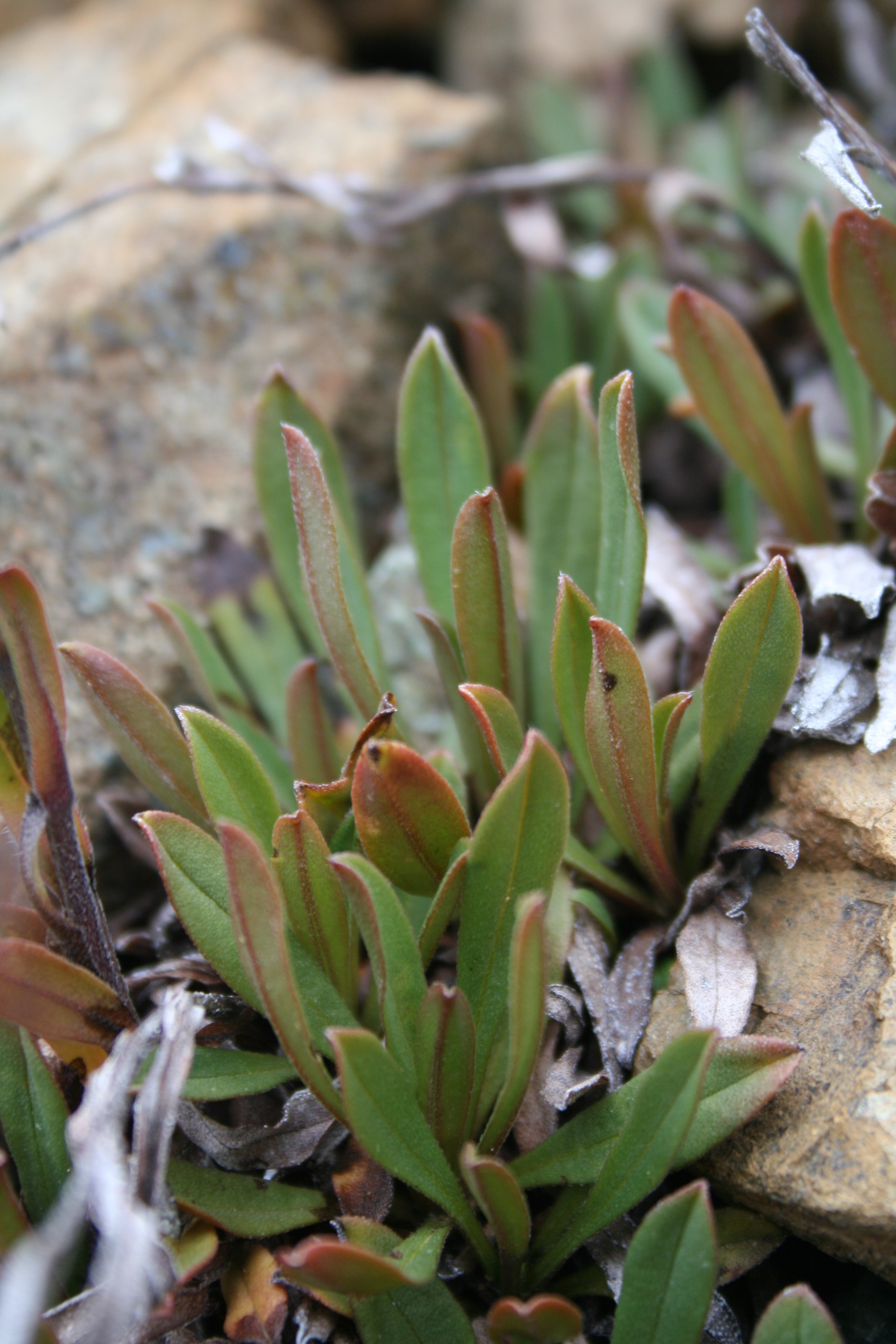
Close-up of leaves

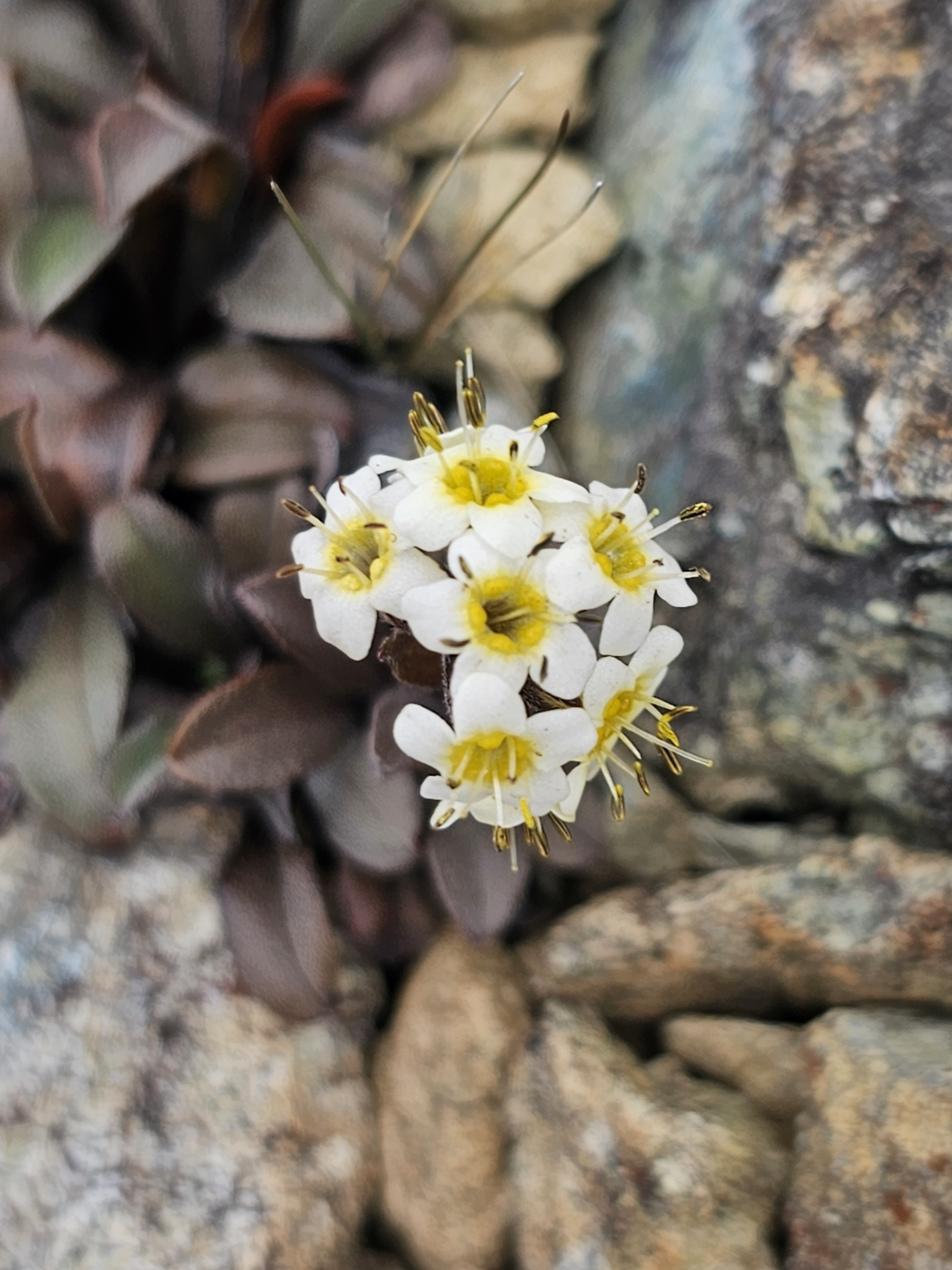
Flowers

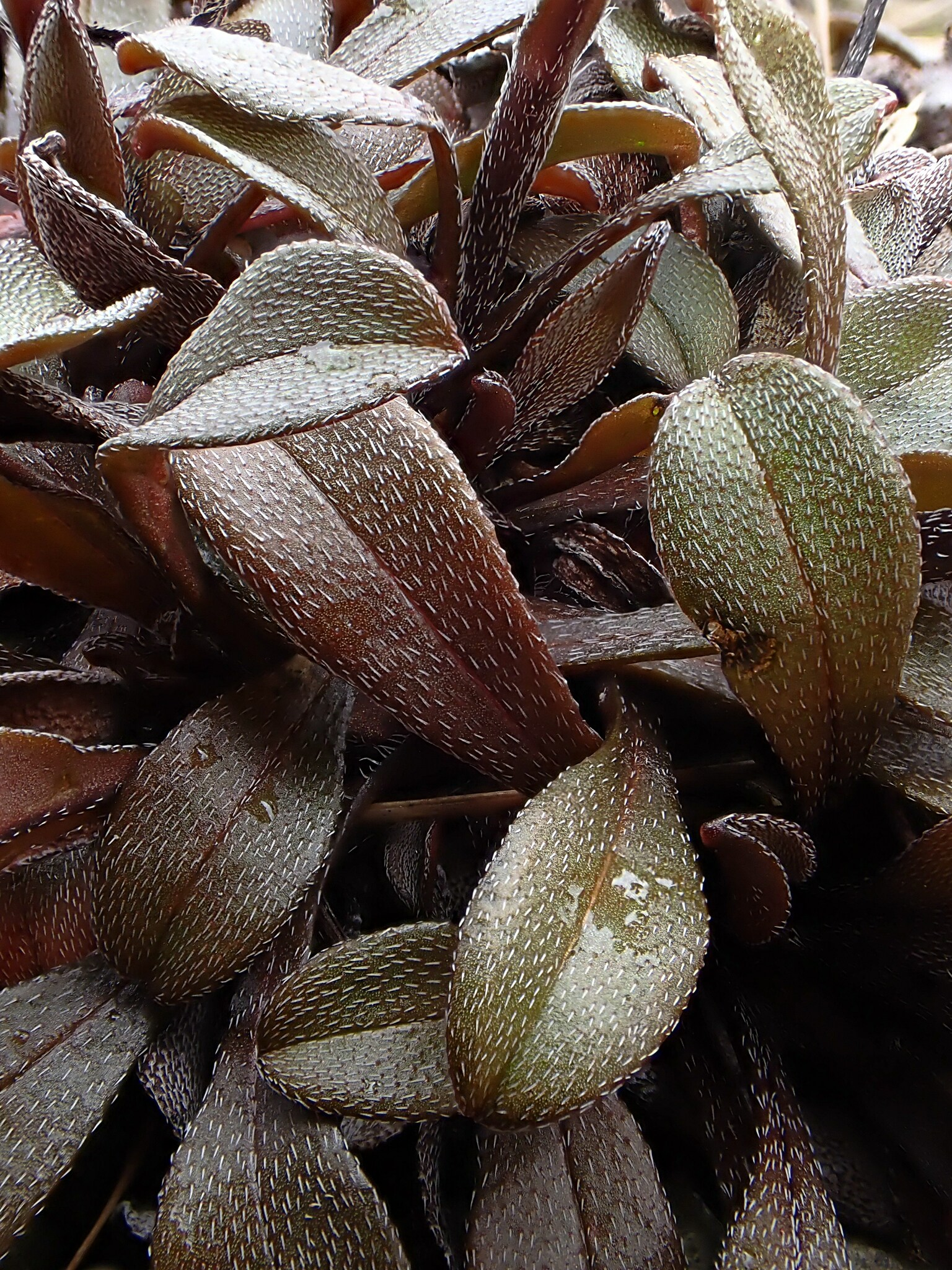
Close-up of leaves
