= Alfred Domett =

Prime Minister of New Zealand from 1862 to 1863

The Honourable Alfred Domett CMG
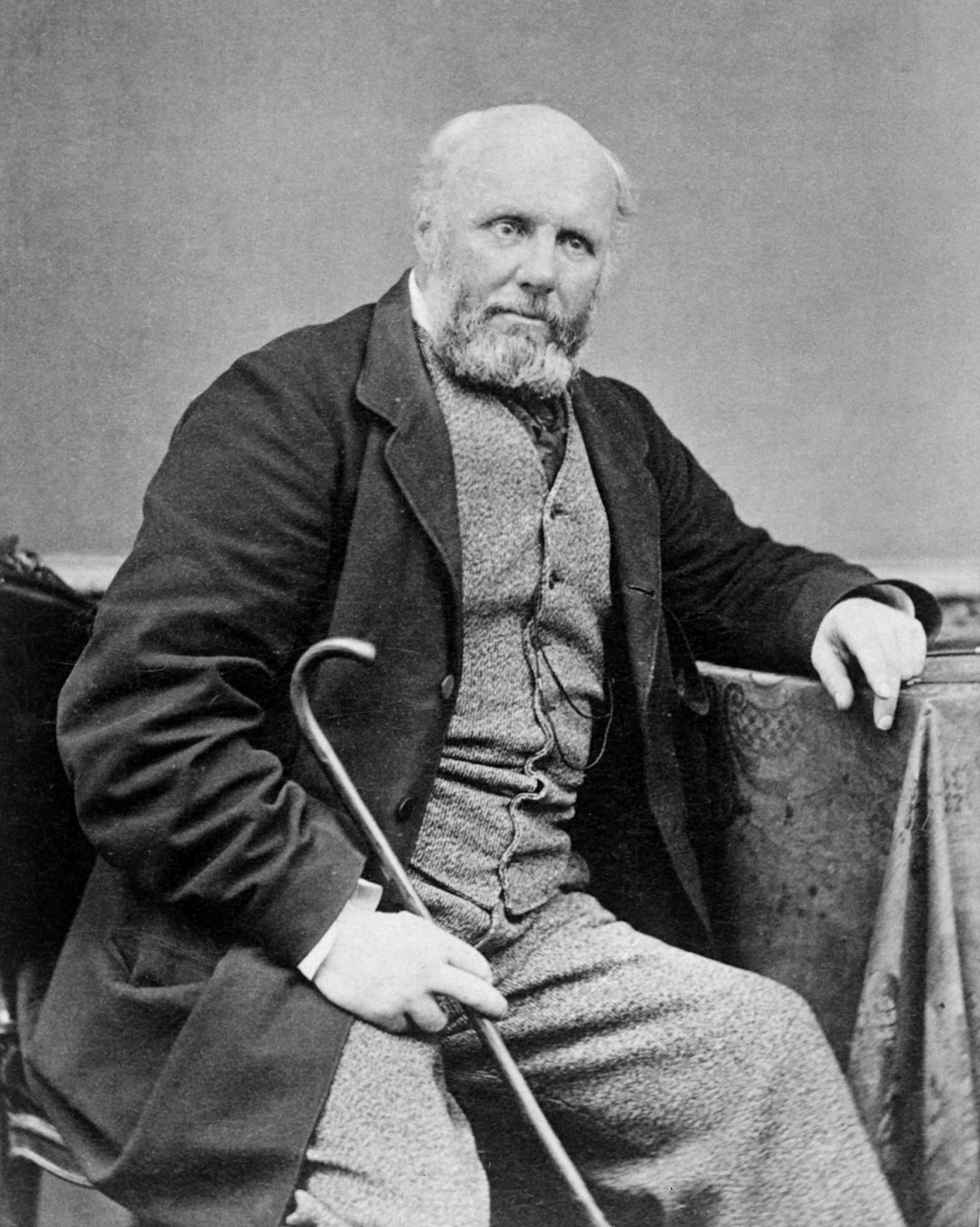

4th Premier of New Zealand
- In office 6 August 1862 – 30 October 1863
- Monarch: Victoria
- Governor: George Grey
- Preceded by: William Fox
- Succeeded by: Frederick Whitaker

Personal details
- Born: 20 May 1811 Camberwell, Surrey, England
- Died: 2 November 1887 (aged 76) London, England
- Party: None
- Spouse: Mary George (m. 1856)
- Children: 1 son
- Parent: Nathaniel Domett (father)
- Relatives: Ernest Dowson (great-nephew)
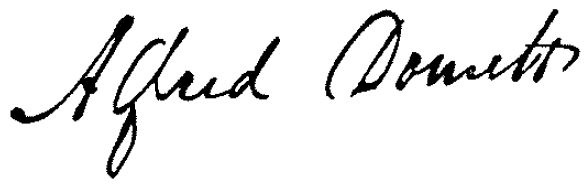
- Signature

Alfred Domett CMG (20 May 1811 – 2 November 1887) was the fourth premier of New Zealand, a close friend of the poet Robert Browning and author of the epic poem Ranolf and Amohia, a South Sea Day Dream. Born in England, he emigrated to New Zealand in 1842 and remained there for a further thirty years, holding many significant political posts.

== Early life ==
Domett "is said to have been born on 20 May 1811" at Camberwell Grove, Surrey, and records show he was baptised on 4 November 1812 at Bermondsey; the sixth child and fourth son of Nathaniel Domett, a ship-owner. He entered St John's College, Cambridge, but left the university in 1833. Domett spent 1833 to 1835 travelling in the United States, Canada and the West Indies. Spending the winter of 1833 in Upper Canada, he gained some experience in surveying and conveyancing. Returning to England, he entered at the Middle Temple on 7 November 1835, and was called to the bar on 19 November 1841.

== Emigration to New Zealand ==
Domett emigrated to Nelson, New Zealand, on the Sir Charles Forbes, departing Gravesend on 1 May 1842 and arriving in Nelson on 22 August with 187 settlers. The following year, a broken leg possibly saved his life as it prevented him from accompanying Captain Arthur Wakefield (1799–1843), the founder of the Nelson settlement and a younger brother of the New Zealand Company's principal architect Edward Gibbon Wakefield (1796–1862), to a confrontation with local Māori beside the Wairau River. On 17 June 1843, Wakefield, twenty-one other settlers, and four Maori were killed in the Wairau Affray.

The aftermath of the Wairau incident resulted in the emergence of Domett as a public figure in Nelson. Governor Fitzroy investigated the affray and concluded that while the Māori who killed those who surrendered needed rebuking, the fault actually lay with the New Zealand Company. A public meeting held by angered settlers, asked Domett to take their case to the Colonial Secretary in Auckland where he said that the Company's claim to the land had been valid and that Pākehā killed were "innocent victims to Māori savagery". In response to the Secretary's reply that under the Treaty of Waitangi, Te Rauparaha was entitled to deny the sale of the land, Domett rubbished the Treaty, questioned the "rights of the aborigines to land, of the capabilities of what they cannot avail themselves" and suggested that the colonists should gather their forces together and defeat the natives.

He was editor of the Nelson Examiner from c. 1843 to 1845 and was again editor, briefly, in 1857. He published a supplement to the paper concerning the Wairau Affray in 1843, and continued to write occasional contributions for that paper. Published in London was a "Petition to Parliament for the recall of Governor Fitzroy, together with a Narrative of the Wairau Massacre. 8vo. 1844–46." Domett's experience of representing the wishes of local settlers in the aftermath of what is now called the Wairau Affray, made him a critic of the policies of Fitzroy, but his "masterly" petition is seen as an even greater criticism of local authorities.

Domett married a widowed schoolteacher, Mrs Mary George of Wellington, on 3 November 1856. She had two sons, John (Johnny) George who joined the Colonial Forces and was killed during Te Kooti's War, at the Battle of Te Pōrere near Tongariro, and James George. In his epic poem “Ranolf and Amohia”, Domett speaks of his stepson John as “young, kindly, chivalrous". Alfred and Mary had a son, Alfred Nelson Domett.

== Publications ==
During his tenure as Colonial Secretary of New Munster, which he held from 1848 to 1853, Domett published the extensive Statistics of the province of New Munster, New Zealand, from 1841 to 1848, in which he revealed his vision of "a free, secular and compulsory elementary education for the colony's children".

In June 1850 he published The ordinances of New Zealand passed in the first ten sessions of the General Legislative Council, A.D. 1841 to A.D. 1849, which had required extensive sorting of ordinances from the 1840s.

In his free time, he devoted himself to completing the poetic epic Ranolf and Amohia, which was published in London in 1872. A small volume of poems appeared in 1877. He continued to adjust Ranolf and Amohia. In 1883, a revised edition of Ranolf and Amohia was printed with the subtitle "A dream of two lives", indicating the sustained bicultural conception, albeit from a Victorian and British-educated point of view, of this poetic project.

== Poetry ==
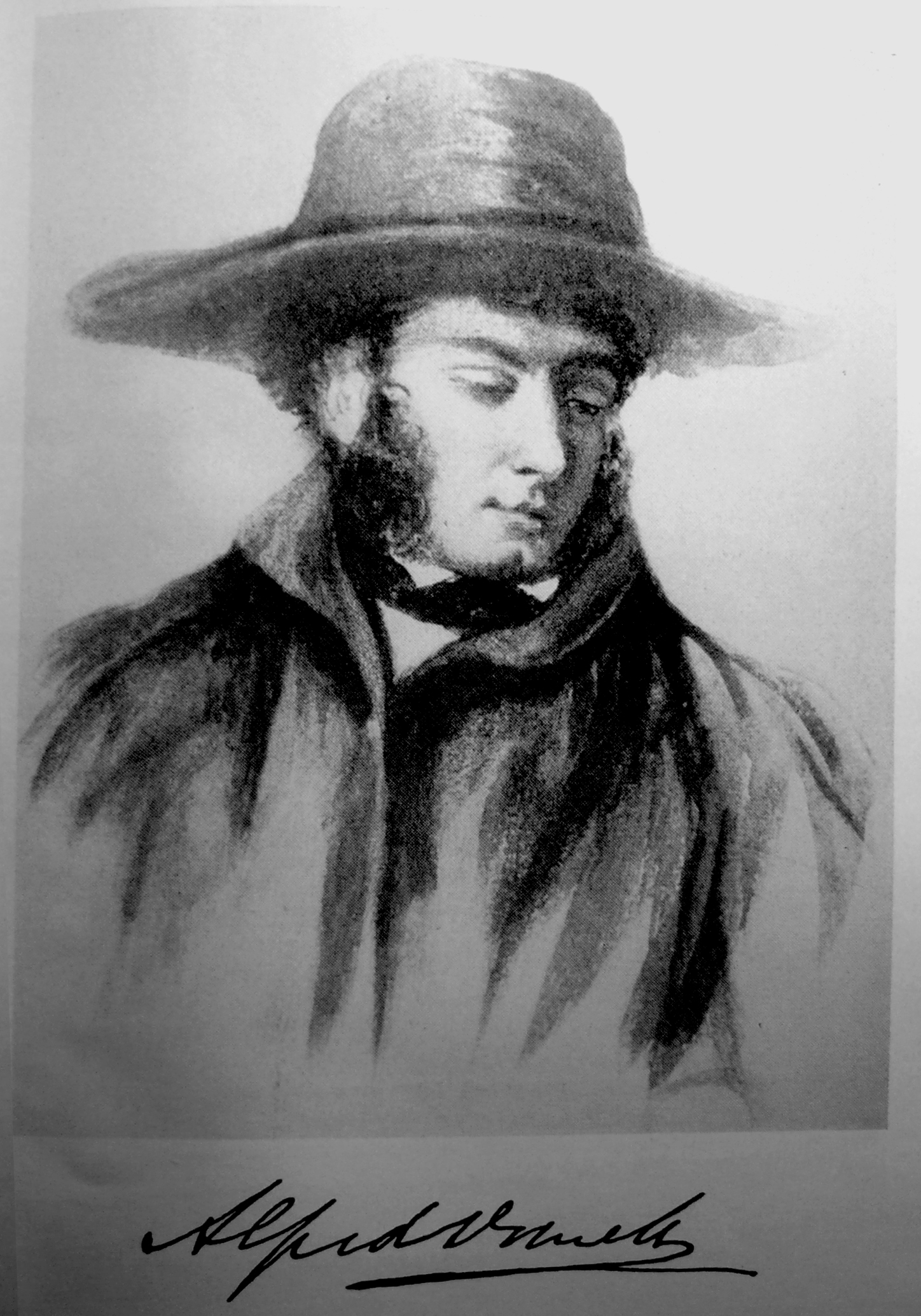
Alfred Domett in 1836 (from the watercolour by George Lance)

Domett's first volume of poetry was published in 1832. Another book of poems, the "more technically proficient" Venice, appeared in 1839. Domett contributed poems to Blackwood's Magazine, one of which, A Christmas Hymn, attracted some attention locally. During the ten years he lived in London, he became the intimate friend of Robert Browning, of whose poem "Waring" he is the subject. In that poem, Browning expresses regret for Domett's sudden disappearance from London, and speaks of Domett with emotion: 'How much I loved him, I find out now I've lost him'. In the poem Browning asks what has become of his friend, but believes he will achieve much in far-off lands:

...so I saw the last

Of Waring! ... Oh, never star

Was lost here but it rose afar!

An account of the friendship between the two men appeared in The Contemporary Review for January 1905, by W. H. Griffin. Thereafter, with the approval of Browning's son, Frederic G. Kenyon edited correspondence between and relating to Browning and Domett, after the 1904 auction purchase of the letters by Reginald Smith, head of publishing firm Smith Elder and Co.

The epic Ranolf and Amohia, a South Sea Day Dream (1872, new edition 1877), includes details of both European and Māori life, and is by far the best known of his works. Flotsam and Jetsam (1877) is dedicated to Browning. More than a century after its publication, literary critic Patrick Evans commented: "Like a stranded whale, the poem lies rotting on the beach of New Zealand literature, an embarrassment that no one knows what to do with."

He continued to write poetry all his life, in the style of rhyming panegyrics such as An Invitation, with its allusions to the sub-tropical flora and threatened inhabitants of countries such as New Zealand:

And if weary of mists you will roam undisdaining

To a land where the fanciful fountains are raining Swift brilliants of boiling and beautiful spray In the violet splendour of skies that illume Such a wealth of green ferns and rare crimson tree-bloom; Where a people primeval is vanishing fast, With its faiths and its fables and ways of the past: O with reason and fancy unfettered and fearless,

Come plunge with us deep into regions of Day—Come away—and away! –

Decadent poet Ernest Dowson was his great-nephew.

== General Assembly Library ==
While Ranolf and Amohia has been the object of both critical scrutiny (chiefly for its prolixity), and post-colonialist analysis (of its 19th-century colonialist values), Domett's legacy in the literary history of New Zealand was the founding of a library of exceptional scope. Domett's involvement in the founding of the General Assembly Library cannot be overestimated. William Gisborne, who later (1881) favoured widening access to non-parliamentarians, described him as the 'father' of the library. The Encyclopedia of New Zealand emphasises his importance in establishing one of the finest libraries of its time, "both in the selection of the collection and in its organisation and classification", laying foundations "for the successful development of that institution." Domett is, therefore, a founder not only of the General Assembly Library, but, also of the National Library of New Zealand. In 2008, Speaker of the New Zealand House of Representatives Margaret Wilson cited the role of the General Assembly Library "in the creation" of that 1965-established institution.

== New Zealand politics ==
New Zealand Parliament
Years	Term	Electorate	Party
1855–1860	2nd	Town of Nelson	Independent
1860–1866	3rd	City of Nelson	Independent

After immigrating to New Zealand, Domett filled several important administrative posts, Colonial Secretary for New Munster Province in 1848, and secretary for the colony in 1851. During his tenure, he urged "a legislative check to large, speculative land holdings".

In February 1854, Domett took up the position of Commissioner of Crown lands and resident magistrate in the Ahuriri district of Hawke's Bay. During his time in Hawke's Bay, Domett played a principal part in naming Napier after General Sir Charles James Napier, GCB (1782–1853), who led the military conquest of Sindh in India in 1843, and the streets of Napier after other men whom he admired in British Indian history and after various poets and literary figures.

In 1855, Nelson residents elected Domett to the House of Representatives and in September 1856, he was appointed commissioner of Crown lands in Nelson.

Thereafter he was the fourth Premier of New Zealand from 1862 to 1863. He represented the electorate of Nelson, first as the Town of Nelson 1855–1860 and then City of Nelson 1860–1866 (retired). As electorates at this time returned multiple members, Domett shared representation of Nelson with Edward Stafford, who had also served as Premier. Domett was a member of the New Zealand Legislative Council from 19 June 1866 until 3 July 1874, when his membership ceased as he had returned to the country of his birth for his final years.

During his tenure in office, Domett brought about the moving of New Zealand's capital from Auckland to Wellington in 1865. In November 1863 he moved a resolution before Parliament that "it has become necessary that the seat of government... should be transferred to some suitable locality in Cook Strait." His movement was carried, but many reference books and parliamentary papers of the inchoate General Assembly Library (known officially after 1985 as New Zealand Parliamentary Library), were lost in a shipwreck during removal from Auckland to Wellington.

While Premier during the Waikato war, Domett urged for the confiscation of all lands of Waikato and Taranaki tribes suitable for settlement and took the position that to enforce this would require increased military presence to "cut down the towering notions of savage independence so long nursed by the Maoris". One biographer suggested that despite advocating for secular education and establishing the General Assembly Library, "[h]is political legacy in New Zealand is mixed...[because of his]... punitive views on the native question and his prosecution of widespread land confiscation".

Domett became a CMG in 1880.

== Later life and death ==
Domett retired in 1871 and he and Mary returned to England. He died in Kensington, close to Central London, on 2 November 1887.

== Notes ==
Government offices
Preceded by Edward Stafford	Premier of New Zealand; 1862–1863	Succeeded by Frederick Whitaker
New Zealand Parliament
Preceded by James Mackay; Samuel Stephens	Member of Parliament for Nelson; 1855–1866; Served alongside: Edward Stafford	Succeeded by Oswald Curtis
