= Charles Kelling =

New Zealand emigration agent, farmer and community leader

Carl Friederich Christian Kelling (21 June 1818 – 28 December 1898), generally known as Charles Frederick Christian Kelling, was a New Zealand emigration agent, farmer and community leader. He was born on 21 June 1818 in Klütz, Grand Duchy of Mecklenburg-Schwerin. He was the older brother of Fedor Kelling. He died at Wakefield. He represented the Moutere (1862–1869) and then the Waimea West (1869–1873) electorates on the Nelson Provincial Council.
