= William Cautley =

William Oldfield Cautley

Member of the New Zealand Parliament for Waimea
- In office 24 May 1854 – 26 May 1854
- Succeeded by: William Travers

Personal details
- Born: 1822 Buckinghamshire, England
- Died: 17 February 1864 London, England

William Oldfield Cautley JP (1822 – 17 February 1864) was a New Zealand settler and politician.

== Early life and family ==
Cautley was born in the English county of Buckinghamshire in 1822, the son of the Reverend Richard Cautley. He was educated at Uppingham School from 1837 to 1840, where he was an exhibitioner on leaving, and then matriculated at Emmanuel College, Cambridge in the Michaelmas term, 1840.

However, in September 1841 he sailed from West India Docks on the Mary Ann, bound for the New Zealand Company's new settlement of Nelson, landing there on 8 February 1842. He began farming a property known as "Wensley Hill" at Waimea East (now called Richmond).

In September 1842 Cautley was appointed as the Nelson postmaster and clerk to magistrates, and in 1848 he was appointed a Justice of the Peace for the province of New Munster.

== Political career ==
New Zealand Parliament
Years	Term	Electorate	Party
1853–1854	1st	Waimea	Independent

In 1850, Cautley was appointed as a member of the short-lived Legislative Council of the province of New Munster.

In the 1853 general election, Cautley was elected as representative for the Waimea electorate alongside David Monro. The first session of the 1st New Zealand Parliament started on 24 May 1854, and Cautley resigned his seat on 26 May 1854. He did not serve in any further Parliaments.

In November 1854, Cautley was elected as a member for Waimea East on the Nelson Provincial Council following the death of sitting member Francis Otterson. Cautley defeated Stephen Lunn Müller by 54 votes to 40.

== Later life ==
Cautley died in London on 17 February 1864, after a long illness.

New Zealand Parliament
New constituency	Member of Parliament for Waimea; 1853–1854; Served alongside: David Monro	Succeeded by William Travers
