= Arthur Robert Oliver =

New Zealand politician

New Zealand Parliament
Years	Term	Electorate	Party
1866–1867	4th	Waimea	Independent

Arthur Robert Oliver (born 1829/30) was a New Zealand politician and a 19th-century Member of Parliament from Nelson, New Zealand.

He was born in London, the son of Thomas Oliver. He was admitted to Wadham College, Oxford in 1848, aged 18. He subsequently emigrated to New Zealand.

He represented the Waimea electorate from 1866 to 1867, when he resigned. In 1882 he took a B.A. and M.A. from St Mary Hall, Oxford.

New Zealand Parliament
Preceded by John George Miles	Member of Parliament for Waimea; 1866–1867	Succeeded by Edward Baigent
