= Fedor Kelling =

New Zealand politician

Fedor Kelling JP
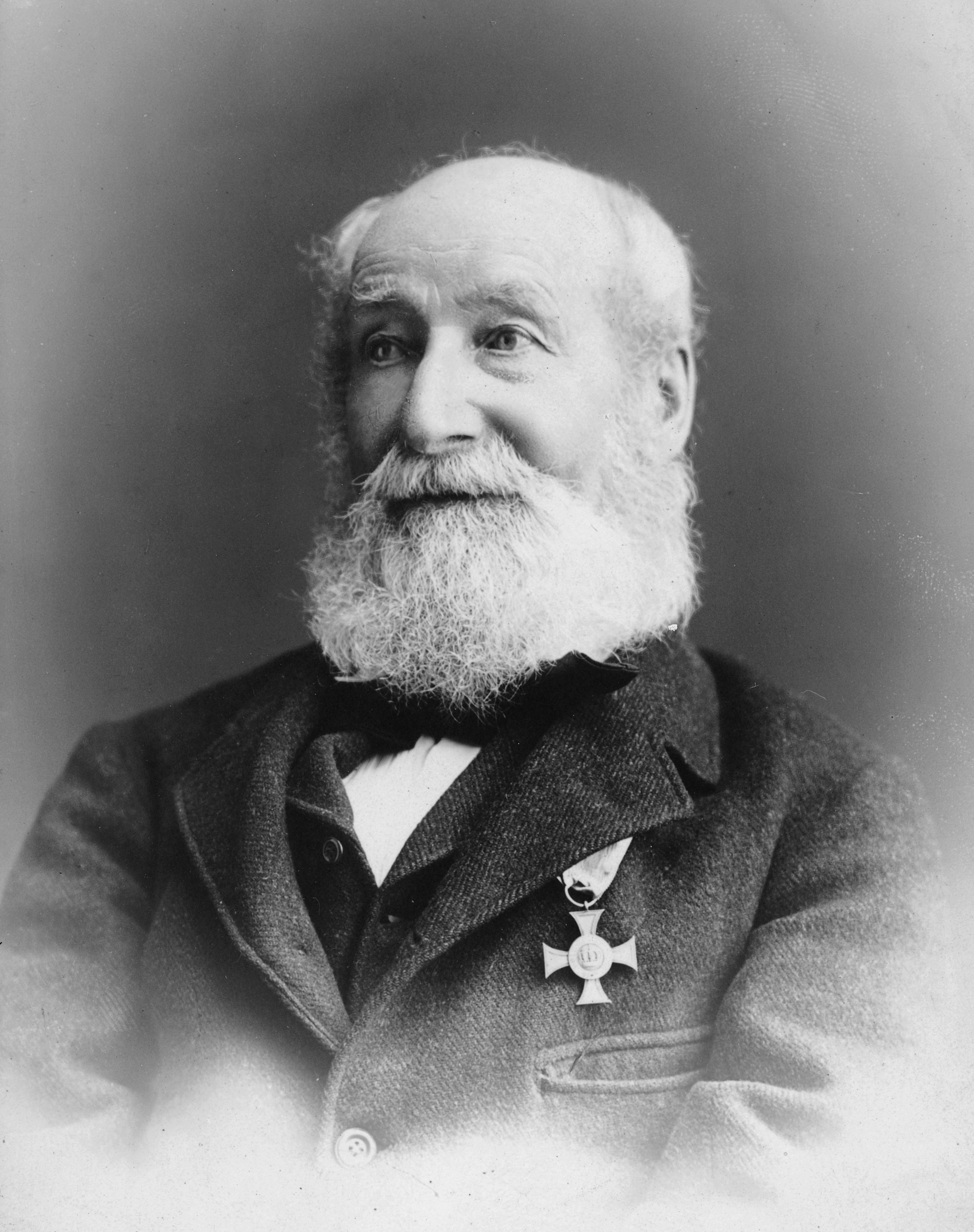
- Fedor Kelling in 1895, wearing the badge of the Order of the Crown

Member of the New Zealand Parliament for Waimea
- In office 1859–1860
- Preceded by: William Travers
- Succeeded by: Alfred Saunders
- Majority: elected unopposed

Personal details
- Born: 11 February 1820 Klütz, Grand Duchy of Mecklenburg-Schwerin
- Died: 24 October 1909 (aged 89) Nelson

John Fedor Augustus Kelling, JP (11 February 1820 – 24 October 1909), known as Fedor Kelling, was a 19th-century Member of the New Zealand Parliament, representing Nelson. A leader of a group of immigrants from Germany, he also served as the German consul.

== Early life ==
Kelling was born as Johann Friederich August Kelling in Klütz, Grand Duchy of Mecklenburg-Schwerin, where he became a farmer. Johann Kelling married Johanna Friederica Christiana Lampe in 1842. Their first child was born in the following year.

Kelling, his brother Carl and the Hamburg merchant Johann Ferdinand Benoit were asked by Count Kuno zu Rantzau-Breitenburg to manage a German immigration project to New Zealand. Together with German emigrants, the Kelling family and Carl left for New Zealand on the Skjold on 21 April 1844 from Hamburg. They reached Nelson on 1 September of that year. Kelling had two further children in New Zealand, but his wife died after child birth on 28 July 1848. In New Zealand, Kelling changed his name to John Fedor Augustus Kelling, and he was known as Fedor Kelling.

== Activities in New Zealand ==
The settlement of Nelson was organised by the New Zealand Company. The affairs in Nelson were poorly organised and the company was in debt. William Fox had been sent in to improve the situation. The day before the German settlers arrived, Fox had suspended the public works scheme, resulting in work opportunities for settlers diminishing. Benoit was discouraged by this and returned home early in the next year. The Kellings and their settlers took up 350 acres (1.4 km^{2}) in a locality that they called Ranzau. Other land was added to it, and soon they had planted field crops, fruit trees, vines, walnuts, hops and tobacco. Houses were built, a pastor arrived, a church was built and the whole developed into a village, which these days is known as Hope.

Kelling was a member of various organisations, including the Settlers Cattle Fair Association, the Nelson Agricultural Association, several road boards, and the Central Board of Education for Nelson. He became a justice of the peace in 1859. In 1863, he was sent as an immigration agent to Germany for Taranaki settlers, but the scheme fell through with the outbreak of the Second Taranaki War.

Kelling had two boys and one girl from his first marriage. He had remarried in 1855 at Ranzau; his second wife was Rose Mary Etty, but she died only six months later. While in Germany as an immigration agent, he married Dorothea (Doris) Wilhelmine Kuskop. She had a son in 1865, but died soon after.

From 1867 to 1886, Kelling was a German consul. The office was disestablished on his own recommendation. For his services, he was awarded the Prussian Order of the Crown.

== Political career ==
Kelling represented the Waimea East electorate on the Nelson Provincial Council. He was first elected on 8 January 1857, the last year of the first Council. He served almost continuously until the abolition of provincial governments at the end of 1876, and was not a member only for the time he spent as an immigration agent in Germany.

New Zealand Parliament
Years	Term	Electorate	Party
1859–1860	2nd	Waimea	Independent

He represented the Waimea electorate from 1859, when he was returned unopposed at a by-election. The 2nd Parliament was dissolved on 5 November 1860.

Kelling intended the contest the 1861 election for Suburbs of Nelson. At a meeting with electors in Stoke, it was decided that there was no real difference in political opinion between Kelling and James Wemyss, the other contender for the position. Kelling thus stepped back from the contest. He instead contested the Waimea electorate again, but was beaten by 125 votes to 60 by Alfred Saunders.

He unsuccessfully contested the Waimea electorate in the 1864 and 1867 by-elections.

The 1871 election in the Suburbs of Nelson electorate was contested by Kelling and Ralph Richardson. Kelling was a supporter of Julius Vogel's public works scheme, whilst Richardson was opposed to it. At the nomination meeting, held at the Provincial Hall on 26 January 1871, the show of hands went eleven to ten in favour of Kelling. On polling day (7 February 1871), Kelling and Richardson received 89 and 130 votes, respectively. The official declaration of the poll was held on the following day, and Richardson was announced elected. Richardson resigned on 31 March 1873 "owing to urgent private affairs which require[d his] immediate departure for England".

The resignation caused the 1873 by-election. At the nomination meeting on 9 May, Charles Elliott, Andrew Richmond and Fedor Kelling were proposed. At the show of hands, they received 7, 15 and 6 votes, respectively. On 13 May, Kelling retired from the election and placed an advertisement in the Nelson Evening Mail, stating that he wanted to avoid vote splitting and urging electors to support Richmond instead, so that the Vogel Ministry can continue with their public works programme. On polling day on Wednesday, 14 May, Richmond and Elliott received 146 and 70 votes, respectively. Richmond was thus declared elected. Richmond had previously represented Collingwood (1861–1868), whilst Elliott had represented Waimea (1855–1858).

== Death ==
Kelling died in Nelson on 24 October 1909. Kelling was buried at the cemetery of Ranzau two days later. He was survived by his three sons; his son-in-law and a nephew also attended the funeral. The Prime Minister, Joseph Ward, sent his condolences by telegram.

New Zealand Parliament
Preceded by William Travers	Member of Parliament for Waimea; 1859–1860; Served alongside: David Monro	Succeeded by Alfred Saunders
