= Henry Ingles =

New Zealand politician (1840–1892)

New Zealand Parliament
| Years | Term | Electorate | Party |
|---|---|---|---|
| 1871–1875 | 5th | Cheviot | Independent |

Henry Anthony Ingles (1840–1892) was a 19th-century Member of Parliament from Canterbury, New Zealand.

He represented the Cheviot electorate from 1871 to 1875, when he retired.

New Zealand Parliament
| Preceded by David Monro | Member of Parliament for Cheviot; 1871–1875 | Succeeded by Leonard Harper |
