= Election in absentia =

Parliamentary procedure

In parliamentary procedure, election in absentia is an election of a presiding officer of a committee or assembly, when the person is not present. More broadly, in the context of an election it may refer to a candidate who is not present in the jurisdiction for which the election is taking place, which may or may not be permitted by the relevant election law.

Julius Caesar famously requested to be allowed to stand for election to the consulship in 59 BC in absentia, contrary to a rule established four years prior requiring candidates for the consulship to be present in Rome: being a magistrate with imperium he could not cross the pomerium, but were he to give up his imperium he would not receive a triumph. In the end the Senate would not grant him permission to stand in absentia, and he chose to forgo the triumph.

During the 2017–18 Spanish constitutional crisis, the regional Parliament of Catalonia voted a law aimed at allowing Carles Puigdemont to stand for election while the former leader was then in self-imposed exile. The Constitutional Court of Spain blocked the move.
