= The Nelson Examiner and New Zealand Chronicle =

New Zealand newspaper active from 1842 to 1874

The Nelson Examiner and New Zealand Chronicle (also known as The Nelson Examiner and then The Nelson Daily Examiner), was the first newspaper published in New Zealand's South Island. It was launched in 1842 by Charles Elliott (1811–1876), a few weeks after New Zealand Company settlers arrived in Nelson. In its early years, the newspaper was criticised for its supposed lack of independence and for being merely a mouthpiece for the New Zealand Company.

Charles Elliott came to Nelson on one of the first four immigrant ships, the Mary Ann, which arrived in Nelson Harbour on 10 February 1842. He brought a printing press with him and the first edition was published on 12 March 1842.

The paper began as a weekly (published on Saturdays), was published twice-weekly from July 1854 (published on Wednesdays and Saturdays), and went daily in July 1873. The edition on 28 March 1855 was the last that was published as The Nelson Examiner and New Zealand Chronicle; from 31 March 1855, the masthead was simplified to show The Nelson Examiner instead. Becoming a daily on 2 July 1873, the masthead was amended to show The Nelson Daily Examiner.

From October 1857, the paper had competition from The Colonist, which was published twice a week (on Tuesdays and Fridays). From March 1866, the paper had a third competitor in The Nelson Evening Mail, which was published as a daily. The Nelson Examiner and New Zealand Chronicle folded in the face of this competition in 1874.

Digital copies of all issues are available online via the National Library of New Zealand.
