= William Travers (New Zealand politician) =

New Zealand lawyer, politician, explorer, naturalist and photographer (1819–1903)

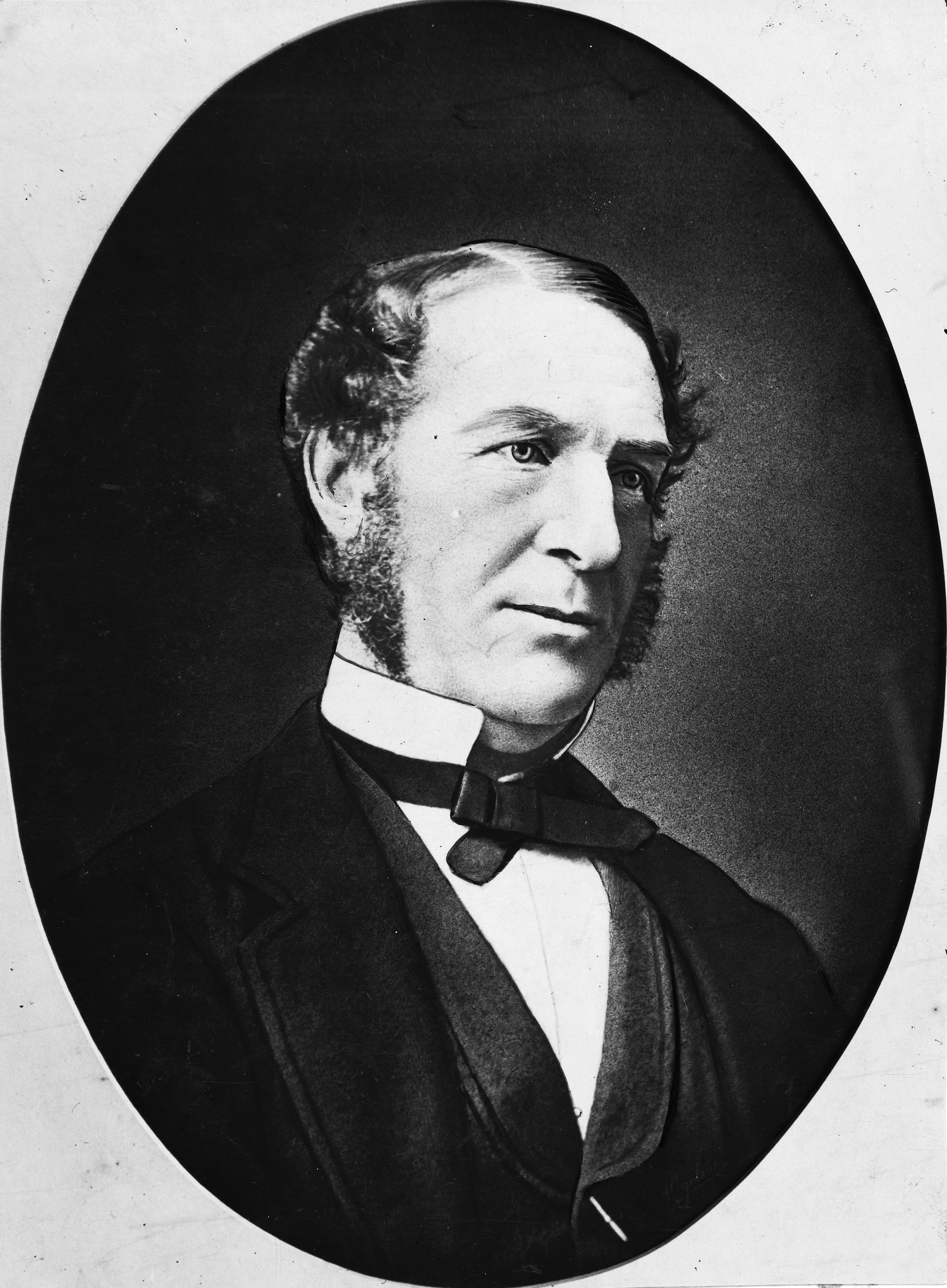
- Travers, c.1879

Personal details
- Born: William Thomas Locke Travers; January 1819 Newcastle West, County Limerick, Ireland
- Died: 23 April 1903 (aged 84) Lower Hutt, New Zealand
- Relatives: Henry Travers (son)
- Profession: Lawyer, magistrate, politician, explorer, naturalist, photographer

William Thomas Locke Travers (January 1819 – 23 April 1903) was a New Zealand lawyer, politician, explorer, and naturalist.

== Early life ==
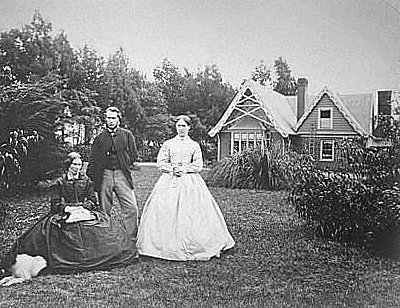
Travers with his wife and daughter in the garden of Englefield Lodge in Christchurch

Travers was born near Newcastle West, County Limerick, Ireland, either on 9 or 19 January 1819. His father chose to retire to France, and Travers was consequently brought up there. He was educated in Saint-Malo, a town in Brittany. In 1835, he joined the British military, and was part of the British Auxiliary Legion that fought in Spain's First Carlist War. After his military service ended, Travers became a lawyer. In 1849, he and his family moved to Nelson, New Zealand, where he continued to practice law. Later, he also lived in Christchurch and Wellington. He purchased Englefield Lodge in Christchurch in 1866 and sold the property in 1872 to Edward Stevens.

== Political career ==
New Zealand Parliament
Years	Term	Electorate	Party
1853–1854	1st	Nelson	Independent
1854–1855	1st	Waimea	Independent
1855–1859	2nd	Waimea	Independent
1867–1870	4th	Christchurch	Independent
1877–1878	6th	Wellington	Independent

Travers' political career covered both national and provincial politics. He was a member of the 1st New Zealand Parliament, representing first the Town of Nelson and then Waimea electorates, and served in the brief Forsaith ministry formed by Thomas Forsaith.

In the 1st Parliament, the Town of Nelson was a two member electorate. On nomination day on 25 July 1853, Travers and James Mackay were the only candidates put forward. They were thus declared elected unopposed. Parliament's first term started on 24 May 1854. Travers and William Cautley, MP for Waimea, both resigned on 26 May 1854. Travers subsequently contested the electorate that Cautley had vacated, being elected in the 21 June 1854 Waimea by-election. He was re-elected in the 1855 general election, but was disqualified on 26 July 1859.

Travers returned in the 4th Parliament as representative for the City of Christchurch, after winning the 1867 by-election. He resigned on 29 July 1870 before the end of the term. He was a member of the 6th Parliament as representative for the City of Wellington, having won the 1877 by-election. He resigned on 25 January 1878.

He also served in the councils of Nelson Province and Canterbury Province, and unsuccessfully stood for the superintendency of both. He stood as one of seven candidates for the Nelson Provincial Council in August 1853 in the Town of Nelson electorate, where five seats were elected. He came sixth and was thus not elected.

He represented Wellington in parliament from 1877 to 1881, but was not elected when he stood again in 1893. In Wellington he was City Solicitor, and was an advocate for the west coast railway in 1878. He subsequently became company solicitor to the Wellington and Manawatu Railway Company which built the line north from Wellington to the Manawatu.

His most significant political contribution was his campaign to make central government (rather than provincial government) responsible for education.

== Author ==
Travers was a frequent contributor to scientific journals and was also the author of Stirring Times of Te Rauparaha.

== Explorer, naturalist, photographer ==
At the same time, Travers was also an avid explorer and naturalist, often mounting expeditions into the less well known parts of New Zealand. He was responsible for tracing the source of the Waiau Uwha River, and gave the Ada River its name. He also collected many samples of mountain grasses and flowers, sending them to the Royal Botanic Gardens, Kew. Travers was also responsible for drafting the legislation that created the Wellington Botanic Garden, and was a Botanic Garden board member for 22 years.

Travers teamed up with Arthur Dudley Dobson in 1864 to explore mining ventures in Golden Bay / Mohua.

== Death and commemoration ==
Travers' first wife Jane died in 1888 aged 67 years old, and he remarried to Theodora Leslie Barclay in 1891. Travers died in an accident at the Lower Hutt railway station on 27 April 1903, when attempting to alight from a moving train. His funeral was held at Lower Hutt, and he was buried in the Bolton Street Cemetery, Wellington. So he left a widow (Theodora) from his second marriage, and a son Henry Travers from his first marriage. Theodora remarried to Colonel Edward Wood in 1905.

Travers' descendants settled in Marlborough.

The Travers River in the Travers Valley, as well as the nearby Mt Travers, the Travers Saddle in the Travers Range, Upper Travers Hut and the Travers-Sabine Circuit in Nelson Lakes National Park are named after him, as is the Travers Room at the Rainbow Ski Area.

At least two plant species were named for him (Myosotis traversii) or for him and his son (Olearia traversiorum).

== Notes ==
New Zealand Parliament
New constituency	Member of Parliament for Nelson; 1853–1854; Served alongside: James Mackay	Succeeded by Samuel Stephens
Preceded by William Cautley	Member of Parliament for Waimea; 1854–1859; Served alongside: David Monro, Charles Elliott	Succeeded by Fedor Kelling
Preceded by James FitzGerald	Member of Parliament for Christchurch; 1867–1870	Succeeded by William Sefton Moorhouse
