= Charles Elliott (New Zealand politician) =

New Zealand politician

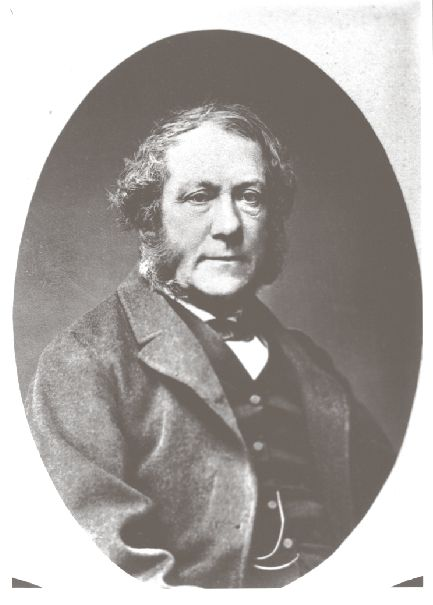
- Elliott (year unknown)

Member of the New Zealand Parliament for Waimea
- In office 5 Nov 1855 – 20 Mar 1858

Personal details
- Born: 22 September 1811 Barnstaple, North Devon, England
- Died: 5 July 1876 (aged 64) Nelson, New Zealand
- Party: Independent

Charles Elliott (22 September 1811 – 5 July 1876) was a New Zealand politician and newspaper proprietor.

== Commercial career ==
Elliott was born in Barnstaple in North Devon in 1811. He came to New Zealand on the Mary Anne; the ship left the West India Docks in London in September 1841 and arrived in Nelson Harbour on 10 February 1842. His brother James came on a later boat. Having brought a printing press with him, Elliott established The Nelson Examiner and New Zealand Chronicle in 1842; this was the first newspaper in the South Island. In August 1842, he opened a bookshop in Nelson, one of the first in New Zealand. He held a sheep station in the Awatere Valley. He was particularly interested in horse racing and wrote for other publications under the pen name "Cheval". He published texts written by the suffragist Mary Müller, to whom he was related through marriage, in his newspaper.

== Political career ==
Elliott was elected to the first Nelson Provincial Council for the Wairau electorate and held the post from 10 August 1853 to 1 August 1857, and represented the electorate in the second council from 9 October 1857 to 18 October 1859. He then represented the Amuri electorate from 7 April 1860 to 29 November 1861. He lastly represented the Nelson electorate from 23 February 1863 to 27 March 1865. In parallel, he represented the Awatere electorate in the Marlborough Provincial Council from 16 April 1860 to 16 October 1861.

New Zealand Parliament
Years	Term	Electorate	Party
1855–1858	2nd	Waimea	Independent

On 5 November 1855, Elliott—alongside William Travers—was elected unopposed to represent the Waimea electorate in the 2nd New Zealand Parliament. Elliott resigned before the end of his term on 20 March 1858. He did not serve in any subsequent Parliaments, although he stood unsuccessfully in the 1873 by-election for the Suburbs of Nelson.

== Later life ==
Elliott's newspaper had to be shut down in 1874. He subsequently took on the role of immigration officer for Nelson Province. He died on 5 July 1876 in Nelson from a stroke. Elliott Street, and the Elliott Street heritage precinct (which also comprises parts of Trafalgar and Collingwood streets) was named after him.

== Notes ==
New Zealand Parliament
Preceded by David Monro	Member of Parliament for Waimea; 1855–1858; Served alongside: William Travers	Succeeded by David Monro
