= Waimea (electorate) =

Waimea was a parliamentary electorate in the Nelson Province of New Zealand, from 1853 to 1887. Initially represented by two members, it was a single-member electorate from 1861.

== Geographic coverage ==
Waimea was located in the northern part of the South Island, facing the Tasman Bay / Te Tai-o-Aorere. It is the area around the town (and since 1874 city) of Nelson, but excluded Nelson itself. It includes Wakefield, Brightwater, Richmond and smaller settlements north of Nelson. It was named after the Waimea River.

== History ==
Waimea was represented by eleven Members of Parliament.

Four members were nominated for the inaugural 1853 election: David Monro, William Cautley, Charles Elliott, and John Saxton. Whilst Elliott and Saxton subsequently withdrew, Monro and Cautley wanted to go ahead with the poll held on 16 August, as one had been demanded on behalf of the other candidates. There was confusion at the Waimea South polling booth and votes were cast for all four candidates there.

William Travers, MP for Nelson, and Cautley, MP for Waimea, both resigned on 26 May 1854 – the third day that the new Parliament was sitting. Travers subsequently contested the seat that Cautley had vacated, being elected in the 21 June 1854 Waimea by-election. Nomination day for the second Parliament in the Waimea electorate was Monday, 5 November 1855. Charles Elliott and Travers were the only candidates and were thus declared elected.

Alfred Saunders was elected on 1 February 1861 and resigned on 31 October 1864. He was succeeded by John George Miles, who was elected in the 1864 by-election, which was held on 20 November.

Arthur Robert Oliver was elected on 23 February 1866 and resigned on 9 January 1867. He was succeeded by Edward Baigent, who was elected in the 1867 by-election, which was held on 28 June.

Joseph Shephard was elected on 13 February 1871, and re-elected on 8 December 1979, 9 December 1881 and 22 July 1884. He resigned on 15 April 1885 when he was appointed to the Legislative Council. The resulting 1885 by-election, which was held on 3 June, was contested by six candidates: John Kerr (253 votes), W. N. Franklyn (250 votes), William White (94 votes), Christian Dencker (91 votes), W. Wastney (59 votes) and Jesse Piper (32 votes). Kerr was thus elected.

== Members of Parliament ==
Key

Independent

=== multi-member electorate ===
Election	Winners	
1853 election	David Monro	William Cautley
1854 by-election	David Monro	William Travers
1855 election	Charles Elliott	William Travers
1858 by-election	David Monro	William Travers
1859 by-election	David Monro	Fedor Kelling

=== Single-member electorate ===
Election	Winner
1861 election	Alfred Saunders
1864 by-election	John George Miles
1866 election	Arthur Robert Oliver
1867 by-election	Edward Baigent
1871 election	Joseph Shephard
1876 election	Edward Baigent
1879 election	Joseph Shephard
1881 election	Joseph Shephard
1884 election	Joseph Shephard
1885 by-election	John Kerr

== Election results ==
=== 1885 by-election ===
1885 Waimea by-election
Party	Candidate	Votes	%	±%
Independent	John Kerr	253	42.38	
Independent	William Norris Franklyn	250	41.88	
Independent	William Whyte	94	15.75	
Independent	Christian Dencker	91	15.24	
Independent	William Wastney	59	9.88	
Independent	Jesse Piper	32	5.36	
Turnout		597		
Majority		3	0.50	

=== 1867 by-election ===
1867 Waimea by-election
Party	Candidate	Votes	%	±%
Independent	Edward Baigent	99	58.24	
Independent	Joseph Shephard	71	35.15	
Independent	Fedor Kelling	32	15.84	
Turnout		202		
Majority		28	13.86	

=== 1864 by-election ===
1864 Waimea by-election
Party	Candidate	Votes	%	±%
Independent	John George Miles	88	53.01	
Independent	Fedor Kelling	78	46.99	
Turnout		166		
Majority		10	6.02	

=== 1854 by-election ===
1854 Waimea by-election
Party	Candidate	Votes	%	±%
Independent	William Travers	126	64.0	
Independent	Francis Jollie	71	36.0	
Turnout		197		
Majority		55		

=== 1853 election ===
1853 general election: Waimea
Party	Candidate	Votes	%	±%
Independent	William Cautley	190		
Independent	David Monro	169		
Independent	John Saxton	30		
Independent	Charles Elliott	14		
Majority		139		
Registered electors		359		
