= Samuel Saunders =

Samuel or Sam Saunders may refer to:

- Samuel Saunders (vegetarian) (1814–1908), English social reformer, activist, and entrepreneur
- Samuel Saunders (journalist) (1857–1943), New Zealand journalist and newspaper editor
- Sam Saunders (footballer) (born 1983), English football midfielder
- Sam Saunders (golfer) (born 1987), American golfer
- Sam Saunders (politician) (1905–2005), American politician in the state of Florida
- Samuel Saunders, son of Laurence Saunders, English Protestant martyr
- Lieutenant Colonel Samuel Saunders of Opequon Confederate order of battle

== See also ==
- Samuel Saunder, mathematician and selenologist
- Samuel Sanders (1937–1999), pianist
