= 1889 Lincoln by-election =

New Zealand by-election

- 16 January 1889
- Turnout: 1008
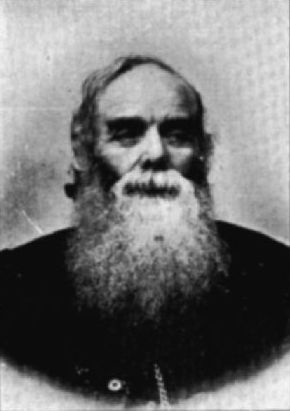
Candidate	Alfred Saunders	John Ollivier
Party	Independent	Independent
Popular vote	676	332
Percentage	67.06%	32.94%
MP before election
Arthur O'Callaghan
Independent
Elected MP
Alfred Saunders
Independent

A 1889 by-election in the Lincoln electorate was held to fill a vacancy caused by the resignation of Arthur O'Callaghan from the Lincoln electorate. The by-election was won by Alfred Saunders, who beat John Ollivier.

== Background ==
Since the Lincoln electorate was established in 1881, it had been held by Arthur O'Callaghan. O'Callaghan was taken to the Christchurch Magistrate's Court over unpaid wages towards the end of 1888. He became insolvent and resigned from Parliament on 9 November 1888. John Ollivier, best known for his activities on the Canterbury Provincial Council and last represented in Parliament in 1860, announced his candidacy on the day of O'Callaghan's resignation. Other possible candidates whose interest was discussed in the media were Edward George Wright, William Rolleston and Alfred Saunders. Wright had contested the 1887 election in the Avon electorate and had been beaten by Edwin Blake. Rolleston had contested the Rangitata electorate in 1887 and had been beaten by Searby Buxton, ending 19 uninterrupted years as a Member of the House of Representatives.

In an editorial, the Wanganui Chronicle argued that Rolleston should be returned for his immense ability. The editor of the Ashburton Guardian put forward that if all four candidates should contest the election, then Ollivier would have the best chance of getting elected, as he was the only opposition politician, whereas the other three would split the votes as ministerialists. The editor of The Evening Post' lamented that it was likely that Saunders was to be returned:

During the last 20 years we have never known any member of the House of Representatives so politically disliked and distrusted on all sides as was Mr. Saunders when he occupied a seat in that Chamber.

With John Woodward, another candidate came forward. At a meeting in Springston on 23 November 1888, the political novice spoke to a large crowd. Never having addressed a large audience before, the nervous speaker had to read much of his message. He finished the meeting by singing a hymn that he had composed himself, 'God Bless New Zealand', to the tune of the national anthem. Possibly due to the performance of the hymn, papers all over New Zealand reported on the meeting.

At the nomination meeting on 9 January 1889, Ollivier and Saunders were put forward, with the latter winning the show of hands. Saunders congratulated Ollivier for the humorous and witty campaign and remarked that "he had not heard a more amusing speech at a nomination than that of Mr Ollivier". The by-election was held on 16 January and was won by Saunders with 676 votes to 332.

== Results ==
Results of the Lincoln by-election held on 16 January 1889 were:

1889 Lincoln by-election
Party	Candidate	Votes	%	±%
Independent	Alfred Saunders	676	67.06	
Independent	John Ollivier	332	32.94	
Turnout		1008		
Majority		344	34.13	

There were 11 polling booths. Ollivier won the booths in Cass, Springfield and Darfield. Saunders won the booths in Lincoln, Springston, Yaldhurst, West Melton, Prebbleton, Sheffield, Halkett, and Kirwee.

Saunders represented the electorate until the end of the term in 1890, at which time the electorate was abolished. He successfully contested the Selwyn electorate in the 1890 election.
