= Lincoln (New Zealand electorate) =

Lincoln was a parliamentary electorate in the Canterbury region of New Zealand from 1881 to 1890. It was represented by two Members of Parliament.

== Population centres ==
The previous electoral redistribution was undertaken in 1875 for the 1875–1876 election. In the six years since, New Zealand's European population had increased by 65%. In the 1881 electoral redistribution, the House of Representatives increased the number of European representatives to 91 (up from 84 since the 1875–76 election). The number of Māori electorates was held at four. The House further decided that electorates should not have more than one representative, which led to 35 new electorates being formed, including Lincoln, and two electorates that had previously been abolished to be recreated. This necessitated a major disruption to existing boundaries.

For the 1881 and 1884 elections, there were polling booths in Springston, Prebbleton, Spreydon and Lincoln. The nomination meeting for the 1887 election was held in Kirwee. The 1889 by-election had polling booths in Lincoln, Springston, Yaldhurst, West Melton, Cass, Prebbleton, Springfield, Sheffield, Halkett, Kirwee and Darfield.

== History ==
The electorate was formed for the 1881 election.

Arthur O'Callaghan and Henry William Peryman contested the Lincoln electorate in the 1881 election. O'Callaghan, who supported the opposition, beat Peryman by 277 to 154.

Alfred Saunders challenged O'Callaghan in the 1884 election. The incumbent narrowly won the election with 266 to 263 votes.

At the nomination meeting for the 1887 election, O'Callaghan, Saunders and John Davis Enys were proposed. Saunders strongly criticised O'Callaghan, who as a government supporter had his share of responsibility of the recession, according to Saunders' claim. Saunders won the show of hands at that meeting, with Enys coming second. Again, O'Callaghan held a narrow majority over Saunders, with 654 over 643 votes. Enys received 127 votes.

O'Callaghan was taken to the Christchurch Magistrate's Court over unpaid wages towards the end of 1888. He became insolvent and resigned from Parliament on 9 November 1888. John Ollivier, best known for his activities on the Canterbury Provincial Council and last represented in Parliament in 1860, announced his candidacy on the day of O'Callaghan's resignation. At the nomination meeting on 9 January 1889, Ollivier and Saunders were put forward, with the latter winning the show of hands. The 1889 by-election was held on 16 January and was won by Saunders with 676 votes to 332.

The electorate was abolished at the end of the 10th Parliament in 1890.

=== Election results ===
The electorate was represented by two Members of Parliament:

Key

Independent

Election	Winner
1881 election	Arthur O'Callaghan
1884 election	Arthur O'Callaghan
1887 election	Arthur O'Callaghan
1889 by-election	Alfred Saunders

== Election results ==
=== 1889 by-election ===
1889 Lincoln by-election
Party	Candidate	Votes	%	±%
Independent	Alfred Saunders	676	67.06	
Independent	John Ollivier	332	32.94	
Turnout		1008		
Majority		344	34.13	

=== 1881 election ===
1881 general election: Lincoln
Party	Candidate	Votes	%	±%
Independent	Arthur O'Callaghan	277	64.87	
Independent	Henry William Peryman	150	35.13	
Majority		127	29.74	
Turnout		427	54.60	
Registered electors		782		
