= Robert Page (chemist) =

New Zealand industrial chemist (1897–1957)

- Born: Robert Owen Page; 23 November 1897; Christchurch, New Zealand
- Died: 14 July 1957 (aged 59)
- Occupation(s): Pacifist, industrial chemist
- Spouse: Nancy Grace Glen (m. 1934)
- Parent(s): Samuel Page and Sarah Saunders
- Relatives: Alfred Saunders (grandfather); Samuel Saunders (uncle); Mary Bayley (great-aunt); William Saunders (great-uncle)

Robert Owen Page (23 November 1897 – 14 July 1957) was a New Zealand pacifist and industrial chemist.

== Biography ==
Page was born in Christchurch, New Zealand, on 23 November 1897. His father, Samuel Page, taught chemistry at Canterbury College, while his mother, Sarah Saunders, was a feminist who promoted social reforms. His maternal grandfather was Alfred Saunders a radical politician.

Robert's friends knew him as Robin, and he attended Christchurch Boys’ High School until 1914. He won a university Junior Scholarship and went to Canterbury College, where he earned a BSc majoring in chemistry in 1917. He was awarded the Sir George Grey Scholarship, a Senior Scholarship and the Haydon Prize.

He was a conscientious objector and was imprisoned in 1918.
