= Mary Bayley =

British temperance activist and writer (1816–1899)

Mary Bayly
- Born: Mary Saunders; 4 March 1816; Market Lavington, Wiltshire, England
- Died: 13 December 1899 (aged 83); Streatham, London, England
- Relatives: Samuel Saunders (brother); Alfred Saunders (brother); William Saunders (brother); Sarah Page (niece); Robert Page (great-nephew); Samuel Saunders (nephew)

Mary Bayly (née Saunders; 4 March 1816 – 13 December 1899), sometimes spelled Mary Bayley, was a British temperance activist and pamphlet writer.

== Life ==
Bayly was born in Market Lavington in 1816, the daughter of Mary (née Box) and Amram Saunders. Samuel Saunders (1814–1908), Alfred Saunders (1820–1905), and William Saunders (1823–1895) were her brothers.

She married in Bath at the Argyle Congregational Chapel to George Bayly who was a master mariner. George would work in the Merchant Navy and Trinity House and he was an amateur artist.

In 1953 she started temperance meetings in North Kensington where mothers of different classes could meet and they could obtain religious and domestic advice. She felt that mothers could alleviate the effects of drunkenous. At the time 60,000 people a year had deaths ascribed to drinking. In 1861 she published Mended Homes and what Repaired Them concerning the effect of alcohol on men and the family. Bayly wanted women to concentrate on making their husband's homes comfortable and to avoid going out to work. Uncomfortable homes drove men to go out to drink she advised. She proposed that men should do the washing in machines so that women could stay at the fireside and avoid going to work in laundries where they too might take to drink.

In 1861 Samuel Gurney and Archibald Campbell Tait (the Bishop of London) attended the opening of her Workmen's Temperance Hall where working men could meet and drink coffee and have a bath. The experiment only lasted until 1866 as the Baylys moved away in 1864 and the organisation soon floundered.

In 1887 she published Danger Signals: how to Use them Wisely. In 1892 she and her daughter, Elisabeth Boyd Bayly (who was a published author) published Home Weal and Home Woe.

Bayly died in Streatham in 1899.
