= Chandos Leigh Hunt Wallace =

English healer and writer (1854–1927)

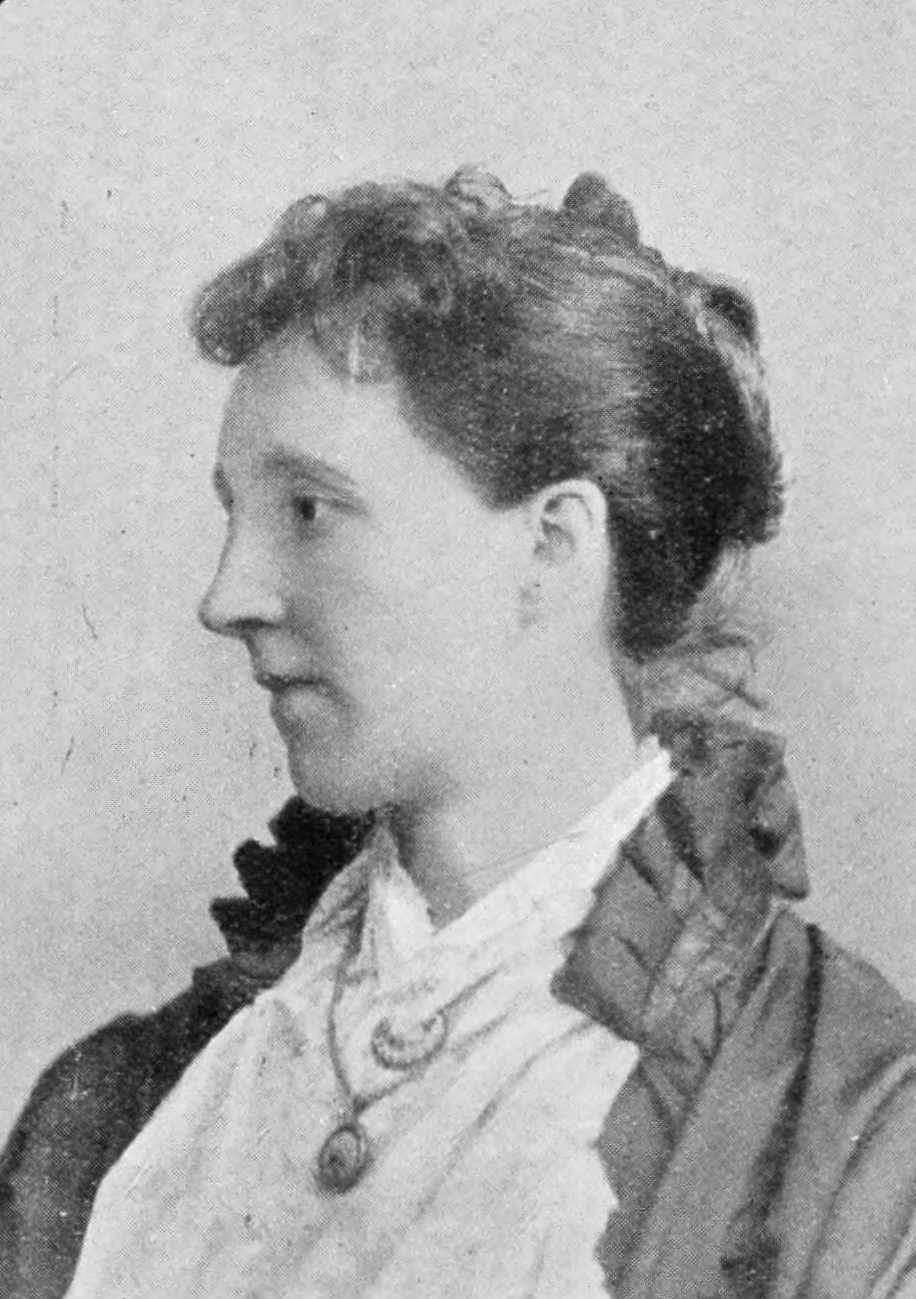
- Portrait from Fifty Years of Food Reform (1898)
- Born: Emily Honoria Leigh Hunt; 1854; Strand, London, England
- Died: 16 March 1927 (aged 72); Great Missenden, Buckinghamshire, England
- Occupations: Healer; writer; entrepreneur; activist
- Spouse: Joseph Wallace (m. 1878; died 1910)
- Children: 7
- Relatives: Leigh Hunt (grand-uncle)

Emily Honoria Leigh Wallace (née Hunt; 1854 – 16 March 1927), known as Chandos Leigh Hunt Wallace, was an English healer, writer, entrepreneur and activist. She wrote on health, spiritualism, food reform and anti-vaccination, and was associated with vegetarianism and the temperance movements.

== Biography ==
=== Early life ===
Wallace was born Emily Honoria Leigh Hunt in the Strand, London, in the third quarter of 1854. She was the grandniece of Leigh Hunt.

=== Career ===
Wallace worked as a lay healer. She claimed that spiritual faith and purity were the best means of healing disease. She was trained by her future husband, Joseph Wallace, whom she met at a phrenological meeting held by James Burns. They married in 1878; the couple had seven children.

Wallace opened a practice in London and employed several assistants. According to Alex Owen, patients were treated with a combination of "dietary control, hydropathy, physical manipulation and mesmerism".

In 1877, Wallace undertook a national lecture tour, speaking at several spiritualist societies. She completed the novel Visibility Invisible and Invisibility Visible in 1879; it was serialised by James Burns. In 1890 she took over ownership of T. L. Nichols' journal Herald of Health, and later became its editor.

Wallace served as a vice president of the Women's Vegetarian Union.

=== Death ===
Wallace died of influenzal pneumonia on 16 March 1927 in Great Missenden, Buckinghamshire, aged 72.

== Publications ==
- A Treatise on All Known Uses of Organic Magnetism (1876)
- Vaccination Brought Home to the People (1876)
- Practical Instructions in the Science and Art of Organic Magnetism
- Flesh Eating a Fashion
- Visibility Invisible and Invisibility Visible (1879)
- Dietetic Advice to the Young & Old (1884)
- Physianthropy: Or, the Home Cure and Eradication of Disease (with Joseph Wallace; 1885)
- 366 Menus: Each consisting of a soup, a savoury course, a sweet course, a cheese course, and a beverage, with all their suitable accompaniments, for every day in the year, no dish or beverage being once repeated, all arranged according to the season, and without the introduction of fish, flesh, fowl, or intoxicants with a cook's guide for the production of the dishes (1885)
- Private Instructions in the Science and Art of Organic Magnetism (1885)
- Visibility Invisible and Invisibility Visible (1888)
- Salt in Its Relation to Health & Disease (1913)
