= Alfred Saunders =

New Zealand politician (1820–1905)

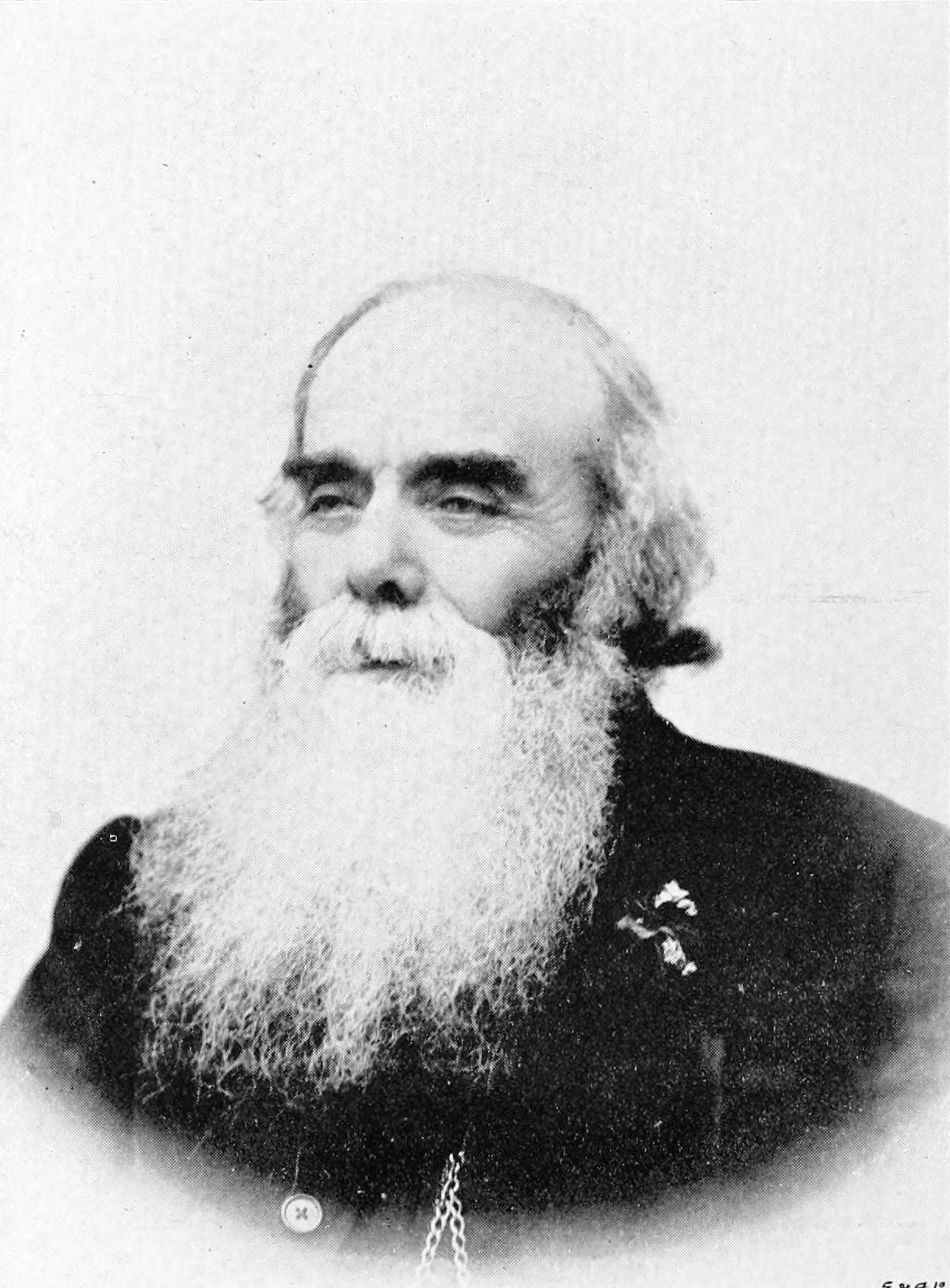
- Saunders, c. 1901

3rd Superintendent of Nelson Province
- In office March 1865 – 4 February 1867
- Preceded by: John Perry Robinson
- Succeeded by: Oswald Curtis

Personal details
- Born: 12 June 1820 Market Lavington, England
- Died: 28 October 1905 (aged 85)
- Party: Independent
- Spouse: Rhoda Flower (m. 1847; died 1898)
- Children: 10, including Sarah, Samuel
- Relatives: Samuel Saunders (brother); Mary Bayly (sister); William Saunders (brother); Robert Page (grandson); Kae Miller (great-granddaughter); Sarah McMurray (niece)

Alfred Saunders (12 June 1820 – 28 October 1905) was a New Zealand farmer, reformer, women's suffrage and temperance advocate and politician. He was Superintendent of Nelson Province and represented several electorate in the House of Representatives.

== Early life and family ==
Saunders was born in 1820 in Market Lavington, the youngest son of Mary and Amram Saunders. He was educated in Market Lavington and at a Bristol academy. The temperance campaigner Mary Bayly was his sister, Samuel Saunders (1814–1908) was an older brother and William Saunders (1823–1895) was a younger brother.

He married Rhoda Flower in 1847. They had ten children, including Sarah Page and Samuel Saunders. Rhoda died in 1898.

He was remarried in England in 1899 to Sarah Box.

== Political career ==
New Zealand Parliament
| Years | Term | Electorate | Party |
|---|---|---|---|
| 1861–1864 | 3rd | Waimea | Independent |
| 1878–1879 | 6th | Cheviot | Independent |
| 1879–1881 | 7th | Cheviot | Independent |
| 1889–1890 | 10th | Lincoln | Independent |
| 1890–1893 | 11th | Selwyn | Independent |
| 1893–1896 | 12th | Selwyn | Independent |

He was elected onto the Nelson Provincial Council representing Waimea South in 1855 and remained a councillor until his election of Superintendent for the Nelson Province from 1865 to 1867. He was elected as Member of Parliament for Waimea in 1861, and he resigned from this seat in 1864. He then represented Cheviot from 1878 to 1881 when he was defeated. He unsuccessfully contested the 1882 by-election in the Wakanui electorate. He contested the 1888 by-election in the Ashley electorate and was defeated by John Verrall by just two votes.

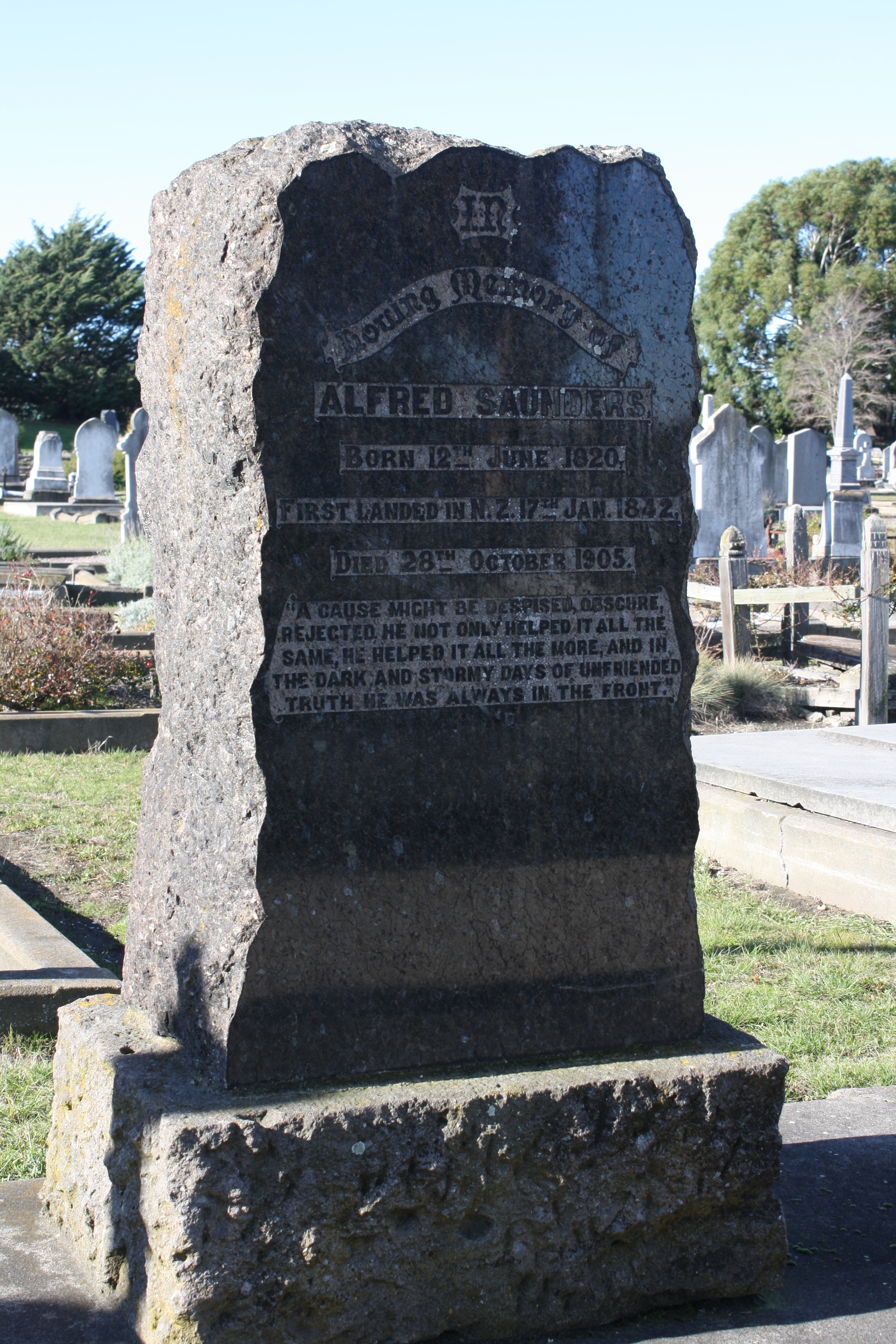
Saunders' gravestone at Linwood Cemetery

From 1889 to 1890 he represented the Lincoln electorate and from 1890 to 1896 he represented Selwyn, being defeated at the general election of 1896 for the latter constituency. He supported the Temperance Union petition in favour of woman's suffrage to Parliament in 1891. He was involved, as an MP, in the political machinations to get legislation passed to give voting rights to New Zealand women, including during the final stages of the legislation in 1893. He also corresponded with the leader of the suffrage movement, Kate Sheppard, to keep her up-to-date with the fast-changing political situation in parliament as the legislation was being debated.

== Authorship ==
Alfred Saunders was an author and his published titles include;

- "History of New Zealand" a comprehensive two volume publication (550 pages.) 1896–99. Contains much on early NZ Governments. Available on line.
- "The Perfect Draft Horse" 1886
- "Tales of a Pioneer" published by his daughters, 1927. Also available on line
- "Our Domestic Birds" 1883
- "Our Horses" 1885.

Political offices
| Preceded by John Perry Robinson | Superintendent of Nelson Province; 1865–1867 | Succeeded by Oswald Curtis |
New Zealand Parliament
| Preceded by David Monro; Fedor Kelling | Member of Parliament for Waimea; 1861–1864 | Succeeded by John George Miles |
| Preceded by Leonard Harper | Member of Parliament for Cheviot; 1878–1881 | Succeeded by Hugh McIlraith |
| Preceded by Arthur O'Callaghan | Member of Parliament for Lincoln; 1889–1890 | Constituency abolished |
| Preceded by John Hall | Member of Parliament for Selwyn; 1890–1896 | Succeeded by Cathcart Wason |
