= Sarah McMurray =

New Zealand craftswoman and woodcarver

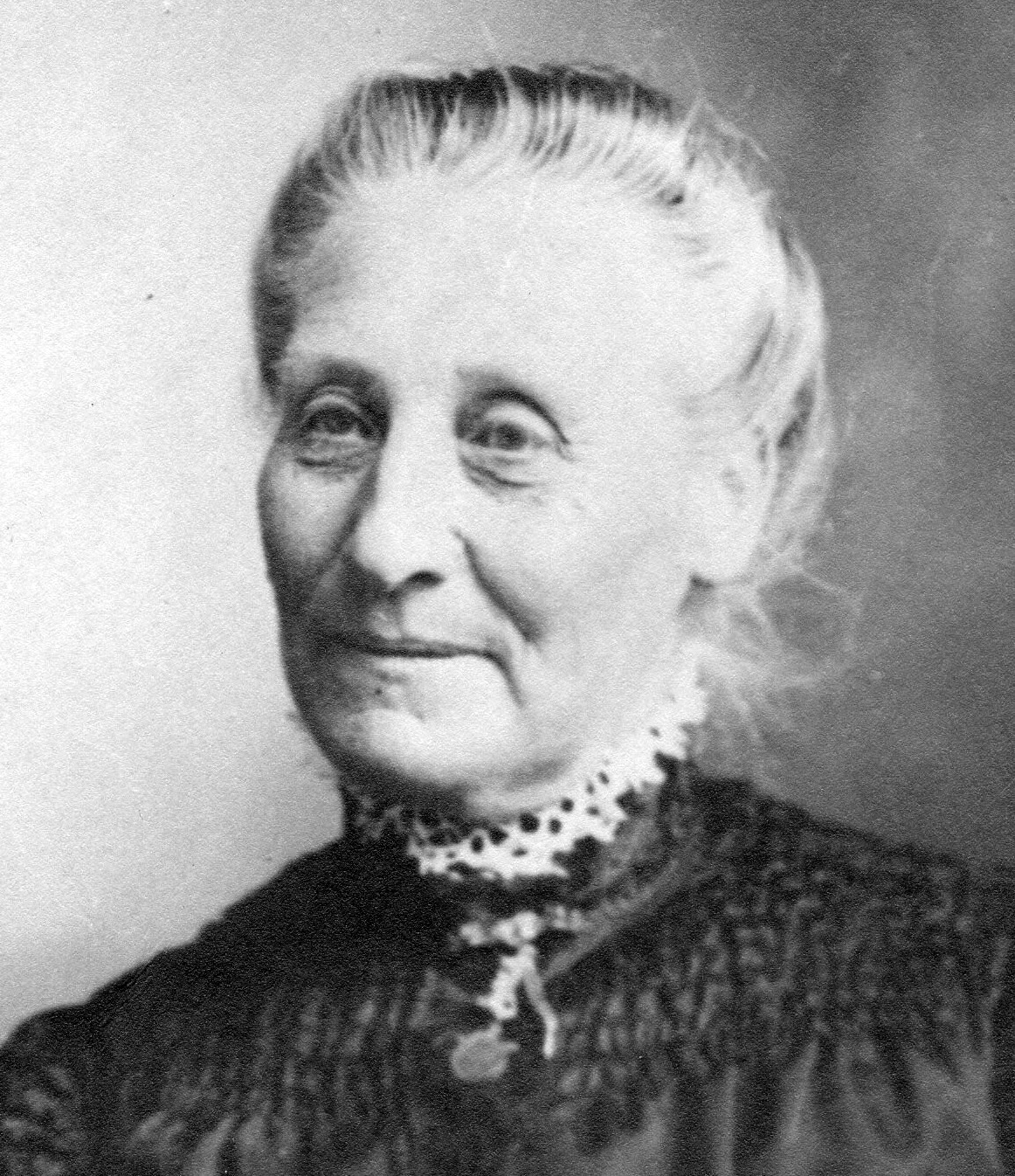
- McMurray, c. 1908
- Born: Sarah Ann Silcock; 26 August 1848; Nelson, New Zealand
- Died: 14 September 1943 (aged 95); Palmerston North, New Zealand
- Other name: Sarah Ann McMurray
- Known for: Wood carving
- Spouse: Robert McMurray (m. 1872; died 1927)
- Children: 6
- Parent(s): Simon Bonnet Silcock and Susannah Flower
- Relatives: Alfred Saunders (uncle); Sarah Page (cousin); Samuel Saunders (cousin)

Sarah Ann McMurray (née Silcock, 26 August 1848 – 14 September 1943) was a New Zealand woodcarver and craftswoman.

== Biography ==
Sarah Ann Silcock was born in Nelson, New Zealand, on 26 August 1848, the third of 14 children. She was the daughter of Susannah Silcock (née Flower) and Captain Simon Bonnet Silcock. Her mother immigrated from England with her parents and sister Rhoda Flower, arriving in New Zealand on the Sir Charles Forbes in 1842. Rhoda Flower later married Alfred Saunders, a prominent politician and advocate for women's suffrage.

On September 12, 1871, she married Robert McMurray. Born in Northern Ireland, he had emigrated to Australia and subsequently to the Otago goldfields. Following their marriage, they resided at his farm, "Thorneycroft," in Brightwater. They had six children. Later they lived for some time in dense forest in the Inangahua Valley on the West Coast of the South Island. In the 1880s they moved to a farm in Awahuri in the North Island. She was among the signatories to New Zealand's 1893 women's suffrage petition. Later moving to Wanganui.

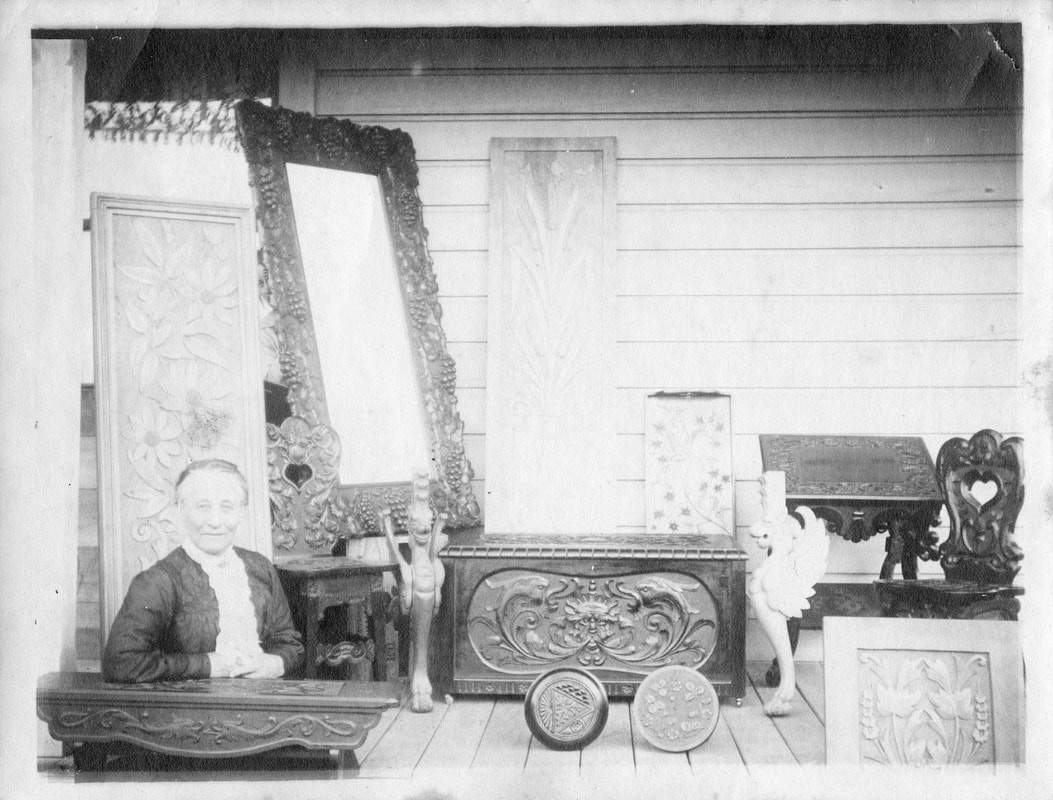
McMurray with some of her woodcarvings.

She began wood carving as a hobby and later, at 50, she enrolled in a local technical college to develop her wood carving skills. She was prolific and elaborately carved most of the furnishings in her house.

In 1914 her and husband Robert McMurray moved to Palmerston North. She continued her woodcarving in Palmerston North working in the garden shed. She worked mainly in kauri. She also handmade toys for her children and grandchildren one of which is in the Museum of New Zealand Te Papa Tongarewa.

== Death ==
McMurray died at her home on Ada Street in Palmerston North on 14 September 1943, aged 95. She is buried at Terrace End Cemetery next to her husband, who died in 1927.
