= Bertha Newcombe =

English artist and suffragist (1857–1947)

- Born: 17 February 1857; Lower Clapton, London, England
- Died: 11 June 1947 (aged 90); Petersfield, England
- Education: Slade School of Fine Art; Académie Colarossi
- Known for: Painting, illustration, suffrage activism
- Family: Samuel Prout (great-uncle); Cornelius Prout Newcombe (uncle)

Bertha Newcombe (17 February 1857 – 11 June 1947) was an English artist and suffragist.

The fourth of seven children of an entrepreneurial father with an interest in education and art, she grew up mainly in Surrey. Aged 19, she entered the Slade School of Art in London and later is believed to have studied at the Académie Colarossi in Paris. She exhibited works in the French naturalist style in the Paris Salon and at the Society of Lady Artists and the Royal Academy in London, with some critical success.

In the 1890s, Newcombe became active in the Fabian Society and she made portraits of a number of prominent socialists, as well as being romantically involved with George Bernard Shaw. At this time the family home – where she had a studio – was in Chelsea, and she became a more-or-less full-time illustrator for publishers of magazines and novels. By the time of the resurgence of the women's suffrage movement in the early years of the twentieth century, she had almost completely stopped working as an artist, but campaigned for the suffragist movement in various capacities. When their father died, in 1912, Bertha and her sister Mabel inherited a sizeable estate. They moved to Hampshire and largely withdrew from public life.

== Early life ==
Bertha Newcombe was born in Lower Clapton, Hackney, London, on 17 February 1857. The family home, Priory House, had also been the schoolhouse when her father, Samuel Prout Newcombe (b. 1824), had worked as a teacher. He was also the author and editor of children’s educational books. After the death of his first wife – with whom he had two children (Frederick and Mary) – he married Hannah Hales Anderton, and Bertha (b. 1857) was the middle of the three children (Ada b. 1856 and Claude b. 1860) by this second marriage to be born in Hackney. Her uncle was Cornelius Prout Newcombe.

In about 1853, Samuel Prout Newcombe had changed career and started The London School of Photography, a photographic portrait studio that soon had branches across London and beyond, exploiting the public’s appetite for carte de visite portraits. His new business venture was a great financial success, and he moved the family out to Surrey – first to Dorking, then, two years later, to Reigate, where two further children were born: Mabel (b. 1863) and Jessie (b. 1865). Samuel Prout Newcombe took a flippant attitude to census returns – in the 1861 return he described the occupation of the young children as 'Playing!' and gave his own occupation as 'watercolour painter', despite at this point still running the photography studios and beginning to invest in housing developments. In 1868, he advertised in the Croydon Chronicle for a large country house (or building land) ‘not more than a mile from the station’. By 1870, when Bertha was 13 years old, he had sold the photographic businesses and the family had moved to a large property, 'Northcote', in Croydon.

== Slade School of Art ==
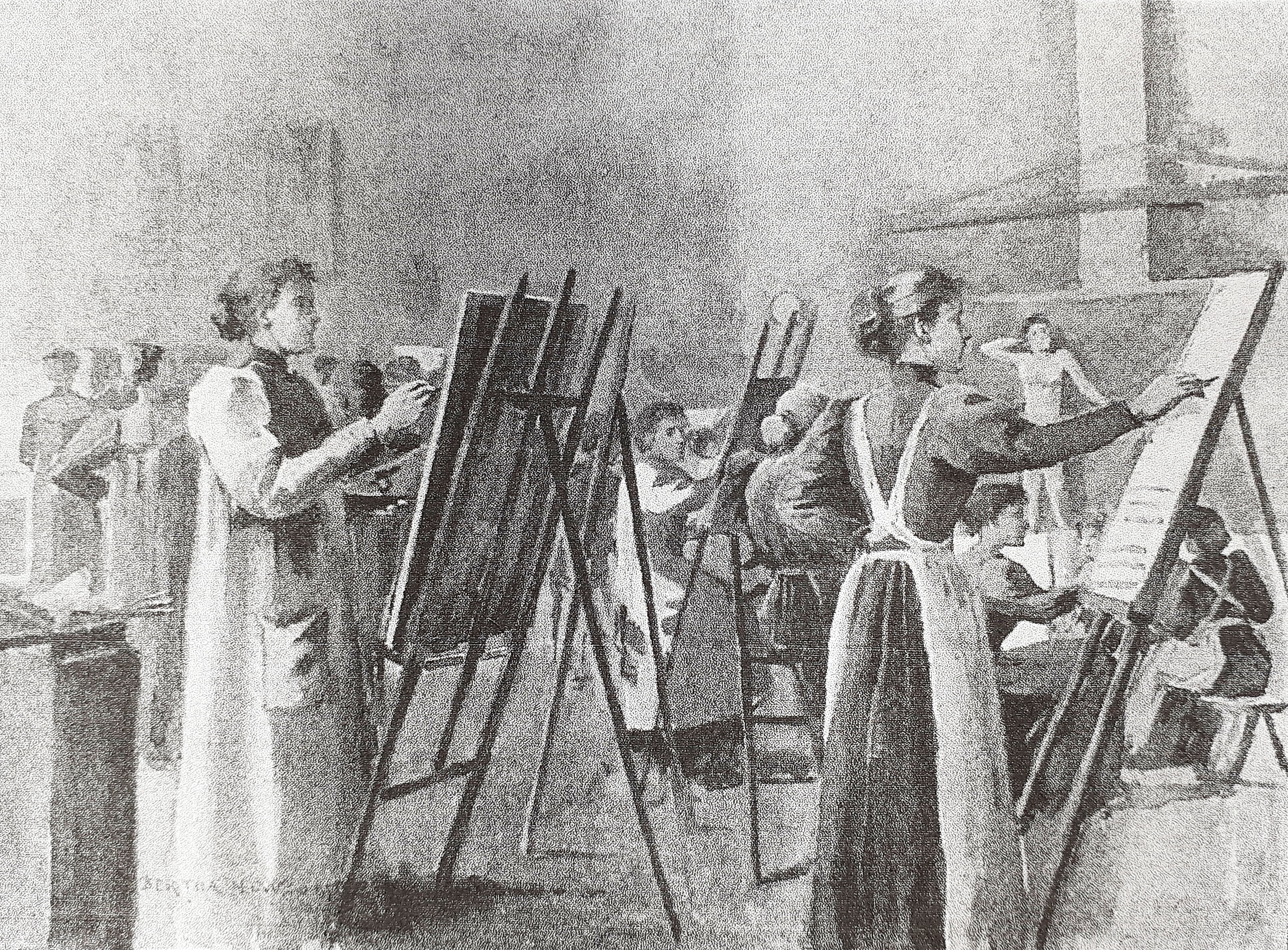
The Slade School of Art life class in an illustration by Bertha Newcombe to accompany the article 'Slade School Revisited' in The Sketch magazine, 13 March 1895.

It seems likely that Bertha Newcombe would have received artistic instruction from her father, who once he was semi-retired was pursuing his own interest in watercolour painting. Samuel’s middle name references his uncle, Samuel Prout (1783–1852), a well-known watercolour artist. At the age of 19, Bertha attended the Slade School of Art in London, where the French painter Alphonse Legros (1837-1911) had recently taken over as professor of drawing, painting and sculpture. Legros was 'a gifted draughtsman and had begun to make his reputation as a realist painter in Paris, moving in the circles of Courbet, Manet, Fantin-Latour and Degas'.

Almost twenty years later Bertha Newcombe returned to the Slade with the writer Alice Stronach when they were preparing an article for the magazine The Sketch. Through Stonach’s article, Newcombe recalls that when she attended the school in the early days of Professor Legros she 'thought that she would never spend a happier time'. She noted that 'The two life-schools – one on the first floor, the other in the basement – were used alternately by men and women, and when the men had their turn of the upper chamber they overflowed to the nether regions and worked with the women.' Newcombe evidently enjoyed the social side and camaraderie at the Slade. This came to the fore at breaks in an improvised subterranean rest space that the students called 'The Beetles’ Home'. Here 'girlish confidences concerning flirtations' were exchanged and 'a certain set, which included some of the prettiest girls in the school, was bitten with the craze for æsthetic dress, then a new fashion, and their taste ran riot among peacock-blues and sage-greens, peacock feathers and poke-bonnets, flowing cloaks and bead necklaces.'

== Paris ==
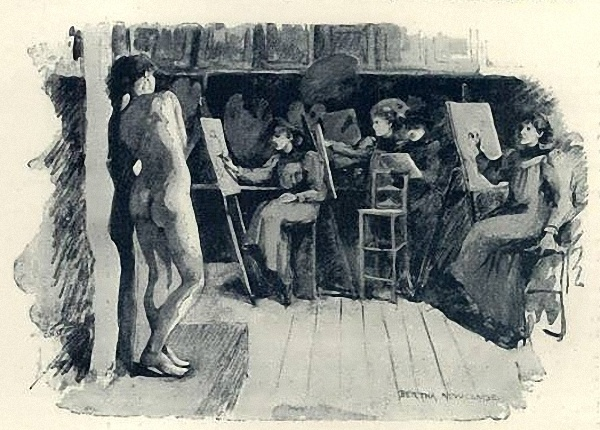
The model, Corinne, in the life class at the Académie Colarossi. This illustration by Bertha Newcombe accompanied the article 'Paris Art Schools' in The Sketch magazine on 2 May 1894.

A bold but logical step for Bertha Newcombe after the Slade was to move to Paris. Luke Herrmann notes that '[Legros] encouraged his abler students to go to Paris, and thus in several ways the Slade acted as a link between London and Paris, and enabled British students to make contact with the much more liberal teaching methods and atmosphere of the French capital.' The extent and nature of Bertha Newcombe’s visits to Paris are not known, but she and Alice Stronach collaborated on an article entitled 'Paris Art Schools' for The Sketch, and this too seems to draw on Newcombe’s personal experience. Reference is made to 'a small band of English girl artists' who pursued their quest of 'an academy where men and women might work side by side under exactly the same conditions'. Eventually 'fate, or the natural course of events, guided the footsteps of the pioneers to the Académie Colarossi', where 'To Angelo [who ran the Académie] it mattered not whether the ladies did or did not study in the same room with the men students.' Newcombe’s exposure to French culture in the broadest sense and to the 'Paris art scene' in particular would have been an immensely transformative experience for her. She would soon be described by critics as an artist working in the 'French manner'.

== Rural scenes in the French manner ==
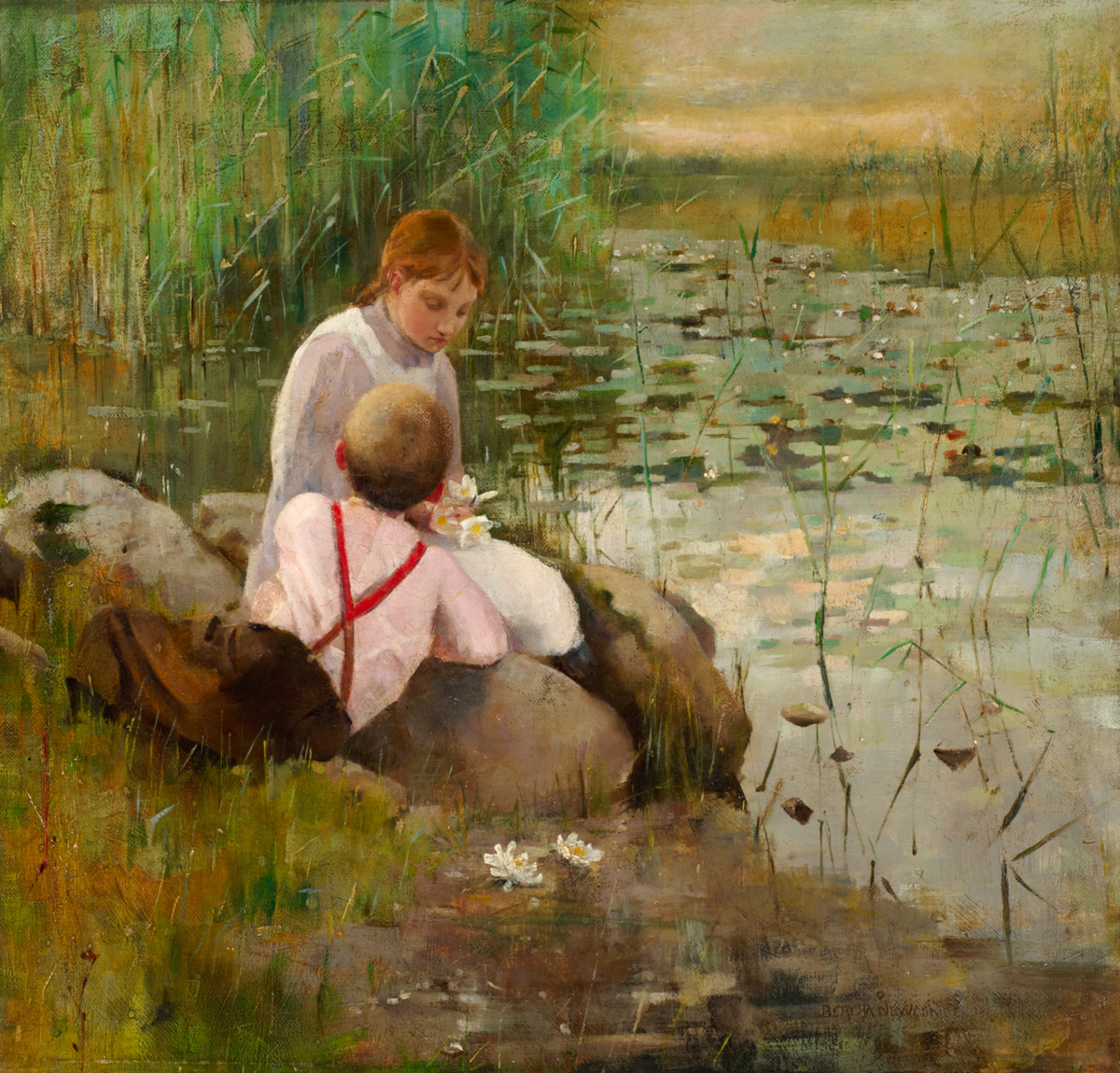
Waterlilies, exhibited at the Society of Lady Artists in 1885.

In 1880, she began exhibiting with the Society of Lady Artists at rooms in Great Marlborough Street, London. The society’s annual exhibition was a large event – with 700 works by over 300 artists – and in 1881 Newcombe exhibited two oil paintings, Gossips and Lingering Footsteps, both priced at £19. Then the Pall Mall Gazette, looking back later, noted that 'Miss Bertha Newcombe made a great success at the [Paris] Salon' in 1881. In relation to the following year’s Salon the Illustrated London News explained the recent tendency of French landscape art towards 'pictures which ... have been painted entirely out of doors'. Examples referred to include Le Père Jacques by Jules Bastien-Lepage and The Ferryman by William Stott. In this context, the reviewer continued, 'We have marked for special approval also a very small picture of a girl resting by a stream, where she has been cutting sedges, by Mdlle. Bertha Newcombe.'

In 1884, The Times felt that 'In the drawing "Home at Last", Miss Bertha Newcombe has given us perhaps the best piece of work that she has yet accomplished in her very French manner,' and the Morning Post the following year explained that she has 'endeavoured to follow in the footsteps of French painters of rural scenes. Her group of peasants returning through the fields in the evening twilight will strongly remind the spectator of the modern Gallic school.' Reviewing the Society of British Artists exhibition in Suffolk Street in 1886 – when James McNeill Whistler had just become president – The Times noted 'the style chiefly in vogue among the exhibitors here ... [has been] picked up in France and transported to England. In the first room, for example, there are good little pictures by Miss Bertha Newcombe, Mr. P. W. Steer ... '

Croydon remained her home address during the 1880s, but she used various London studios, and throughout the decade she was often 'abroad' – presumably in France.

== The New English Art Club ==
Newcombe had continued to exhibit with the Society of Lady Artists throughout the 1880s, and also at the Royal Academy from 1882. Then, in 1888, she began exhibiting with the New English Art Club. The NEAC had been founded two years earlier by a group of British artists who had been together in Paris – 'many of the works [exhibited at the NEAC in 1886] were in the "rustic naturalist" manner of the short lived but influential French painter Jules Bastien-Lepage.' Stanhope Forbes (1857–1947) was one of the NEAC artists whose work shares some characteristics with Newcombe’s. As even more radical ideas of modernism in 'English' art were emerging, the NEAC’s exhibiting policy became controversial, and Forbes and the group of artists associated with him – known as the 'Newlyn School' – resigned from the NEAC in 1890, 'largely as a protest against the pre-dominance of "Impressionist" artists, led by Walter Sickert'. Newcombe continued exhibiting with the NEAC until 1894.

== A Chelsea studio ==
While still keeping a country home in Surrey, Samuel Prout Newcombe in 1891 leased No. 1 Cheyne Walk, a recently built town house in fashionable Chelsea, London SW. It was large enough for his family, and for a few years it housed his natural history collection. It also provided an artist’s studio for Bertha, and accommodated four live-in servants.

At this point, Bertha Newcombe’s career and personal life took a dramatic change. She continued to exhibit a few paintings, but channelled her interests in art into the commercial illustration of books and magazines. She also became increasingly involved in Fabian Society politics.

== George Bernard Shaw and the Fabian Society ==
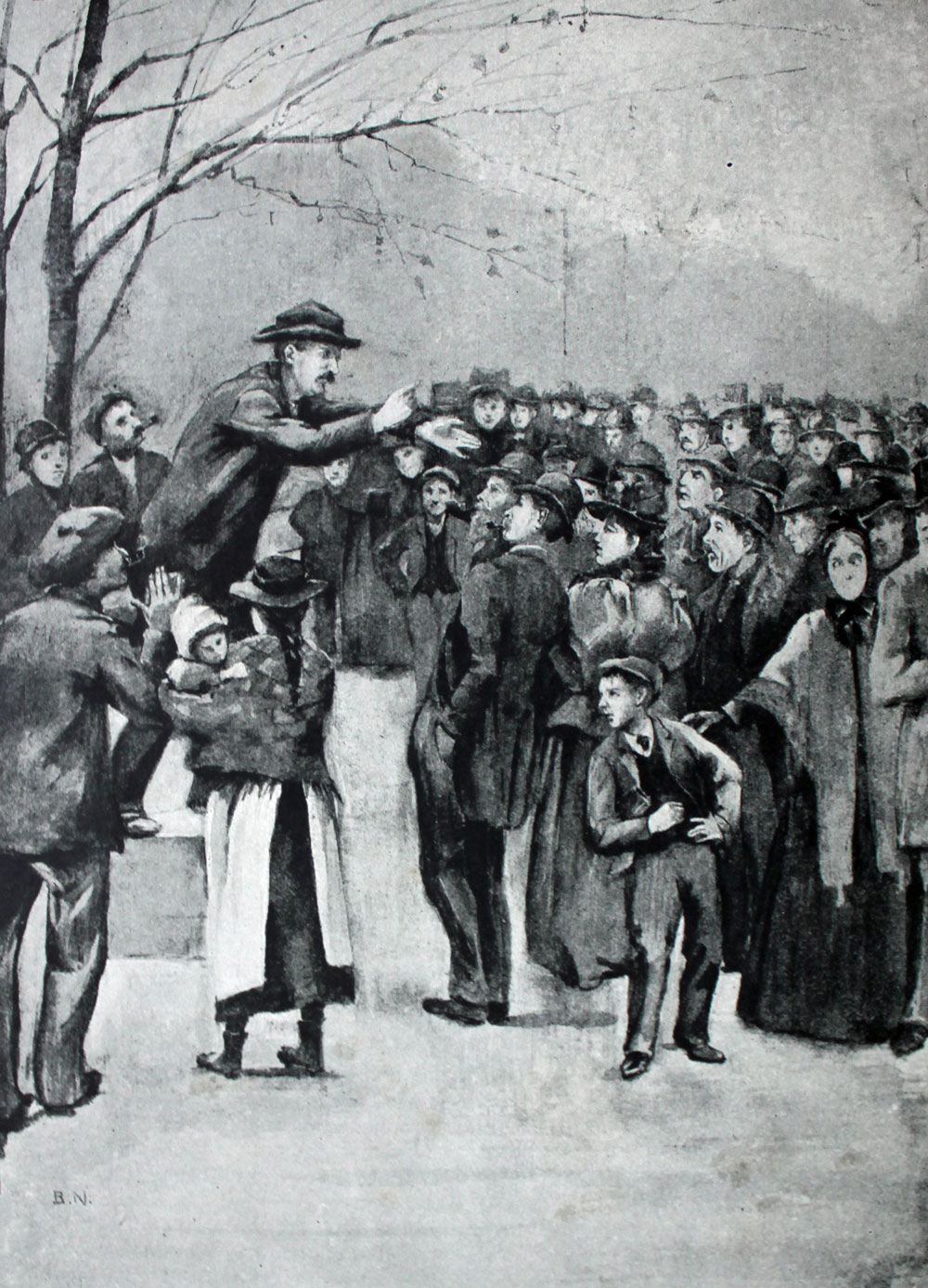
The Socialists at Hyde Park, by Bertha Newcombe, published in the Windsor Magazine in 1896.

The Fabian Society, founded in 1884, had attracted many prominent contemporary figures to its socialist cause, including George Bernard Shaw, H. G. Wells, Annie Besant and Emmeline Pankhurst. By the early 1890s, Sidney and Beatrice Webb were very much at the society’s core. In this context, Bertha Newcombe was commissioned to paint a portrait of George Bernard Shaw. Shaw’s biographer Michael Holroyd draws upon Beatrice Webb’s diaries to provide a description of Newcombe at this time: 'She was in her thirties and, despite her aquiline features, thin lips and a figure that put Beatrice [Webb] in mind of a wizened child, not perhaps lacking absolutely all attraction. At least she was smartly turned out, petite and dark, with neat, heavily fringed black hair. And she was devoted to Shaw.' Shaw began to sit for his portrait at her studio at Cheyne Walk on 24 February 1892. 'As the portrait progressed so, inevitably, did the painter’s fascination with the sitter. On 27 February Shaw gave her a sitting until nine-thirty in the evening and dined with her afterwards.' Shaw was not known as a playwright at this time, and Newcombe’s portrait – entitled GBS – the Platform Spellbinder – alludes to his charismatic presence as a political speaker.

Newcombe’s relationship with Shaw falteringly progressed. According to Webb, Bertha Newcombe 'spoke of her five years of devoted love [to Shaw], his cold philandering, her hopes to marry'. Eventually (in 1898) Shaw married Charlotte Payne-Townshend. With hindsight Newcombe could see that Shaw was 'a passionless man ... The sight of a woman deeply in love with him annoyed him. He was not in love with me, in the usual sense, or at any rate as he said only for a very short time ... '

During the time of this relationship, Newcombe provided an illustration of Beatrice and Sidney Webb for the cover of the Fabian pamphlet Problems of Trade Unionism and also an illustration for The Sketch that commemorated the 'breakfast party at Borough Farm, near Milford, Surrey, on 4 August 1894' that led to the founding of the London School of Economics. In 1896 Bertha worked with Alice Stronach on an article, 'Socialist Leaders of Today', for which Newcombe provided portraits of Edward Pease, Harriot Eaton Stanton Blatch, Herbert Burrows and Henry Hyndman.

== Bertha Newcome as illustrator ==
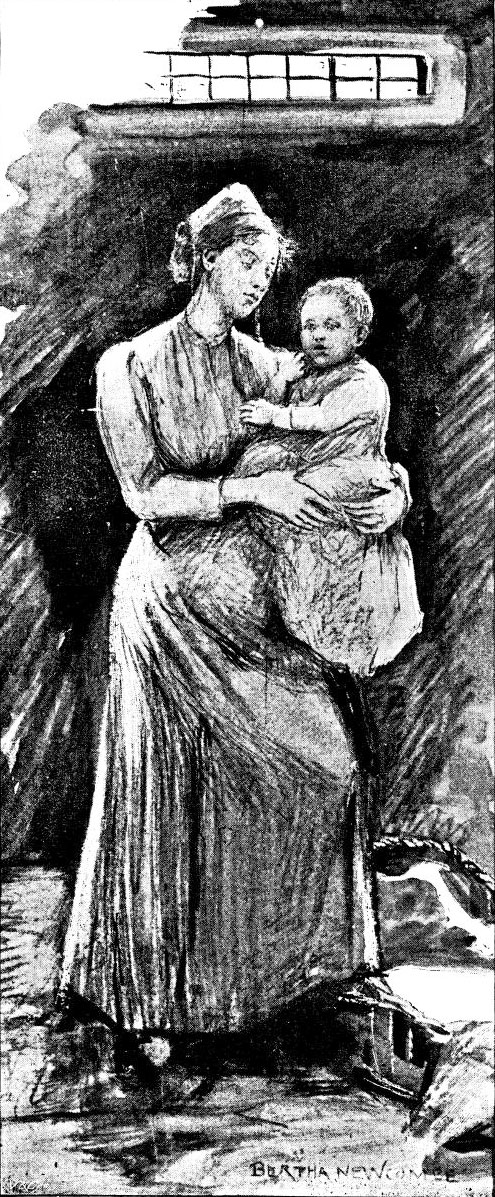
A Madonna of the Cells, an illustration by Bertha Newcombe for the article 'Women Prisoners' published in the Windsor Magazine in 1896.

Although she achieved some critical success as an exhibiting artist, it is not known to what extent Bertha Newcombe sold her paintings or whether she had any patrons. From the mid-1890s she withdrew from all exhibiting groups with the exception of the Royal Academy. In the article on the Slade School referred to above it is acknowledged that, in order to earn a living as an artist, most students will have to combine fine art with work as an illustrator. In 1894 Newcombe provided four illustrations for Henry Stephens Salt’s Richard Jefferies: A Study, published by J. M. Dent, who went on to commission 30 illustrations of Cumbrian life for John Watson’s Annals of a Quiet Valley by a Country Parson. Untypically, some of these illustrations were displayed in a gallery setting alongside work by Walter Crane and Aubrey Beardsley.

Over the next ten years, the illustration of short stories and novels aimed mainly at women became a full-time occupation for Newcombe. The illustrations seem to have pleased both readers and publishers to the extent that she seems to have been continually in work. Promotional copy describes the illustrations as 'pretty' and 'delightful'. On the whole the drawings are competent and follow the literary style of the stories in being conventional and unchallenging. On only a few occasions – such as in relation to Alice Tronach’s assignments for The Sketch (1894–5) and the Windsor magazine (1896) and in illustrations for Major Arthur Griffiths’s article on 'Women Prisoners' for the Windsor Magazine (1896) – does an assignment seem to capture Newcombe’s artistic imagination. With an impressive output, she seems to have been virtually a staff illustrator for the publisher Ward, Lock & Co. until 1906/7.

Around this time her life took another turn: she stopped taking commercial illustration work and became more involved in the women’s suffrage movement. Her mother died in 1905, and she exhibited at the Royal Academy for the last time in the following year.

== Women’s suffrage ==
Bertha Newcombe’s parents had supported women’s suffrage, and her mother, Mrs Hannah Hales Newcombe, had been treasurer of the Croydon branch of the National Society of Women's Suffrage in 1873. With the resurgence of the women's suffrage movement from 1903 and given her involvement in Fabian politics, it is not surprising that Bertha herself was active in the London Society for Women's Suffrage – a branch of the National Union of Women's Suffrage Societies (NUWSS), also known as the 'suffragists'. The NUWSS pursued 'Votes for Women' through peaceful, non-violent, constitutional means, and was critical of the aggressive methods of the Women's Social and Political Union (WSPU) – the 'suffragette' movement. In 1909 Bertha Newcombe was on the NUWSS’s executive committee.

Bertha was fully committed to the unglamorous realities of political campaigning: fund-raising, personal financial contributions, propagating the NUWSS’s message through the sale of its newspaper, Common Cause, and playing a role on organising committees. Perhaps her most significant intervention was her letter-writing campaign to influential men within London’s cultural elite, and a related letter published in The Times in 1909 to publicise the petition that the NUWSS was organising for men to support the Votes for Women campaign.

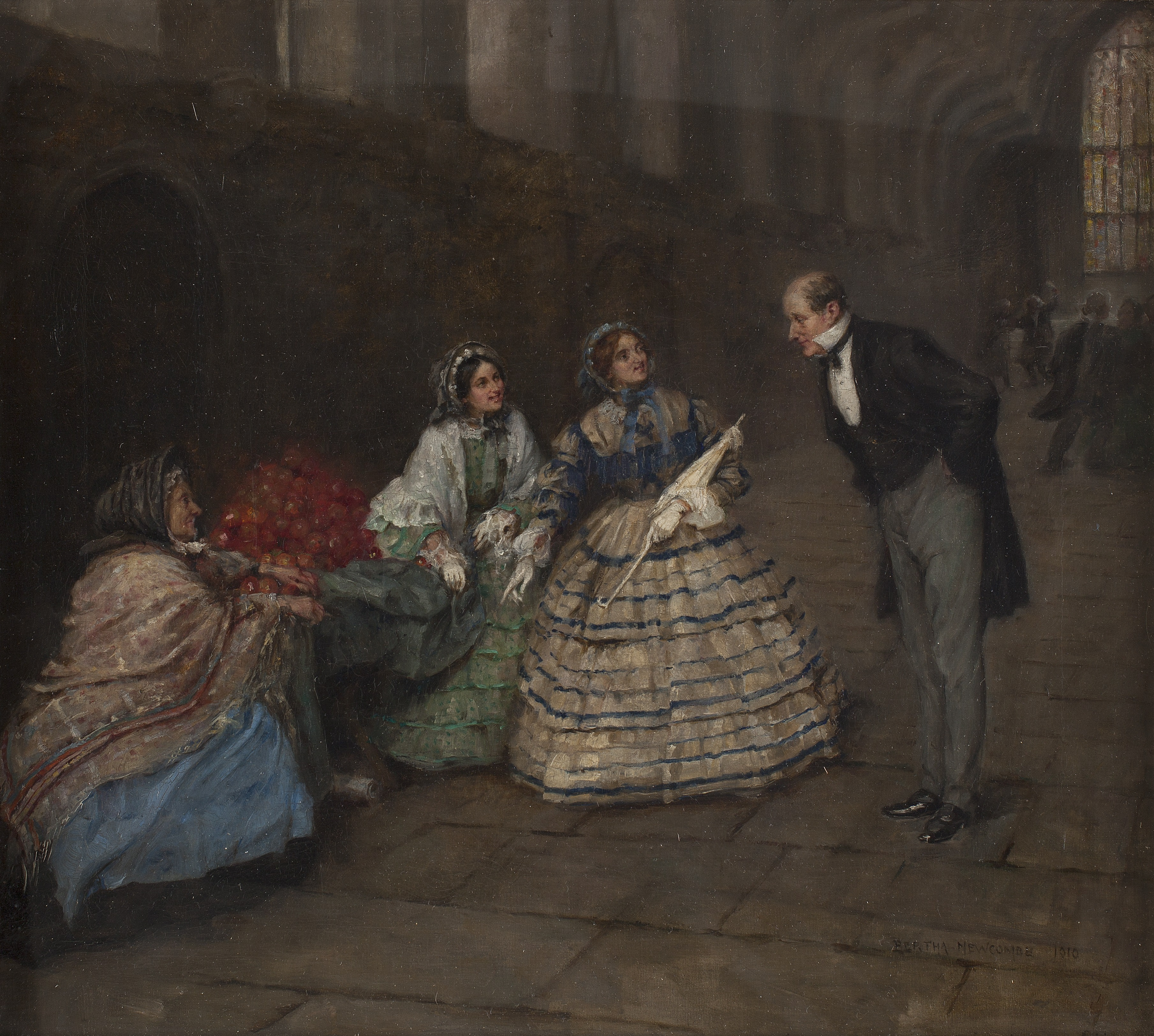
Elizabeth Garrett and Emily Davis presenting the 1866 Women's Suffrage Petition to Sir John Stuart Mill in Westminster Hall, painted in 1910.

That Bertha Newcombe was an artist was only of minor relevance to her activism. She is listed as being in the Artist’s Suffrage League (established in 1907) – the league’s organising committee were largely Chelsea-based female artists – but no known work was produced by Newcombe under the ASL’s auspices. An oil painting Elizabeth Garrett and Emily Davis presenting the 1866 Women's Suffrage Petition to Sir John Stuart Mill in Westminster Hall was submitted to the Royal Academy in 1910 but was not selected for exhibition. What prompted the painting is not known, and what it depicts – in the rather pedestrian style of her illustrations for romantic fiction – is not obvious.

== Retirement ==
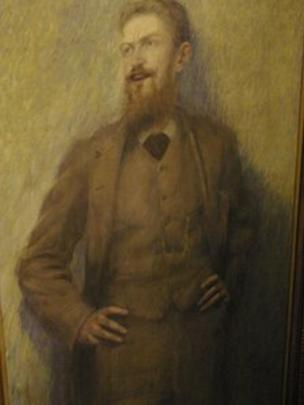
GBS – the Platform Spellbinder, 1892.

Bertha Newcombe and her younger sister Mabel were still living with their father at Cheyne Walk at the time of the 1911 census; however, in the following year he died, leaving an estate of £25,629 10s. 6d. – equivalent to about £2.9 million in 2018. Bertha was 55, Mabel 50, and by the 1920s they were living at Petersfield in Hampshire. There are few records of Bertha’s life after she left London. Apparently she donated money to the Women's Pioneer Housing Association, a not-for-profit organisation which aimed to help single women find secure, affordable housing in the 1920s, and in 1934 she supported the Shoreditch Housing Association to provide good housing for the needy.

In 1929 Bertha Newcombe and George Bernard Shaw attended a much-belated unveiling of her 1892 portrait GBS – the Platform Spellbinder, at the National Labour Club.

== Legacy ==
Bertha and Mabel Newcombe lived at 'Redlynch' in Petersfield for twenty years, and died in 1947 three months apart: Bertha on 11 June and Mabel on 12 September. Bertha was 90 years old. Her estate was worth £15,473 (equivalent to about £595,000 in 2018), and most of it was bequeathed to the Shoreditch Housing Association to be 'devoted to the housing in flats or rooms of elderly women of strictly limited means' – in 1952 Lady Cynthia Colville opened the 'Newcombe estate' at Aberdeen Park, Highbury. Four oil paintings by Bertha Newcombe – Water Lilies (c.1885), Winter Fuel (1886), Landscape with Pond, Sheep and Figures (1892) and The Goatherd (1893) – are in the collection of Southwark Council’s Arts and Heritage Unit at the Cuming Museum, London.
