= C. P. Newcombe =

English educator and social reformer (1825–1913)

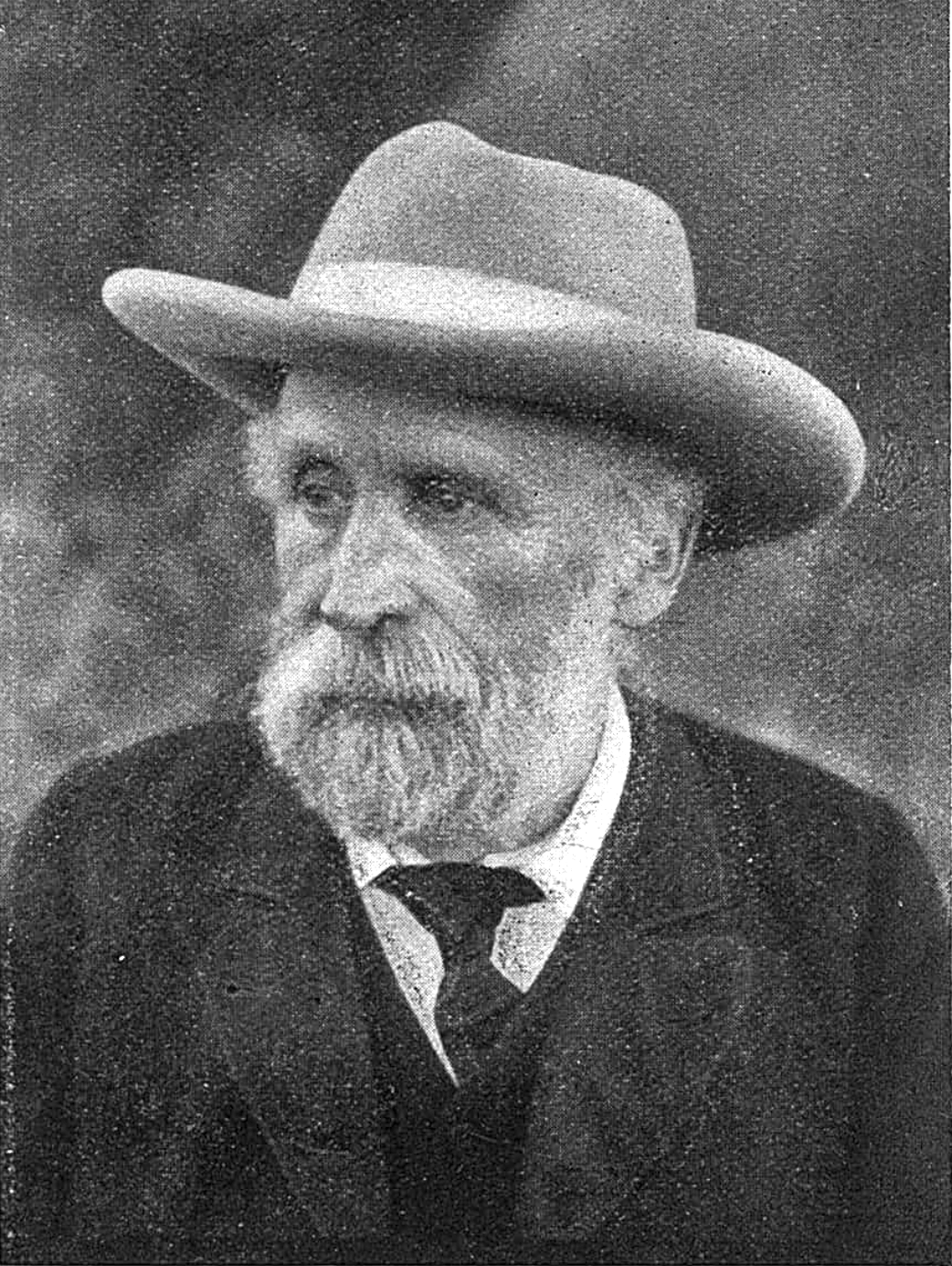
- Newcombe in 1905
- Born: Cornelius Prout Newcombe; 5 September 1825; Shoreditch, Middlesex, England
- Died: 30 July 1913 (aged 87); Rusthall, Kent, England
- Occupations: Educator; social reformer
- Years active: c. 1850–1913
- Known for: Advocacy of vegetarianism, early veganism, and temperance
- Notable work: The Diet Cure of Cancer (c. 1904); The Manifesto of Vegetarianism (1911)
- Spouses: Caroline Tunnicliff (m. 1848; died 1857) Mary Kirk (m. 1858; died 1882)
- Children: 4
- Family: Samuel Prout (uncle); Ebenezer Prout (cousin); Bertha Newcombe (niece)

Cornelius Prout Newcombe (5 September 1825 – 30 July 1913) was an English educator and social reformer associated with vegetarianism, early veganism, and the temperance movement. After working in insurance and shipbuilding, he became a schoolmaster. Around 1859 he operated a vegetarian boarding school, and in 1868 he founded Alexandra Park College in Hornsey. He later worked as a head teacher in New Zealand before returning to England.

Newcombe was active in the British vegetarian movement from the late nineteenth century. He edited The Vegetarian Messenger and Health Review, published The Manifesto of Vegetarianism (1911), and argued that humans were anatomically adapted to a plant-based diet. He also promoted the claim that strict vegetarianism could cure cancer and sought funding for a Fruitarian Cancer Hospital. In temperance work, he edited the Temperance Gazette and worked with temperance organisations. After his death, the Vegetarian Society established an essay prize in his memory.

== Biography ==
=== Early life ===
Cornelius Prout Newcombe was born on 5 September 1825 in Shoreditch, Middlesex. He was the second son of Frederick Newcombe, a butcher, and Hannah Newcombe (née Prout). He was related to the painter Samuel Prout, the musical theorist Ebenezer Prout, and the artist and suffragist Bertha Newcombe.

=== Career ===
In the early 1850s, Newcombe became a partner in Griffiths, Newcombe & Co., an insurance brokerage and shipbuilding firm. The partnership collapsed in 1854, after which he became a schoolmaster. Around 1859, he ran a vegetarian boarding school. In 1865, he was elected a member of the Royal Society of Arts. In 1868, he founded Alexandra Park College in Hornsey. He later worked as a head teacher in New Zealand before returning to England around 1895 and retiring to Torquay.

=== Vegetarian and vegan advocacy ===
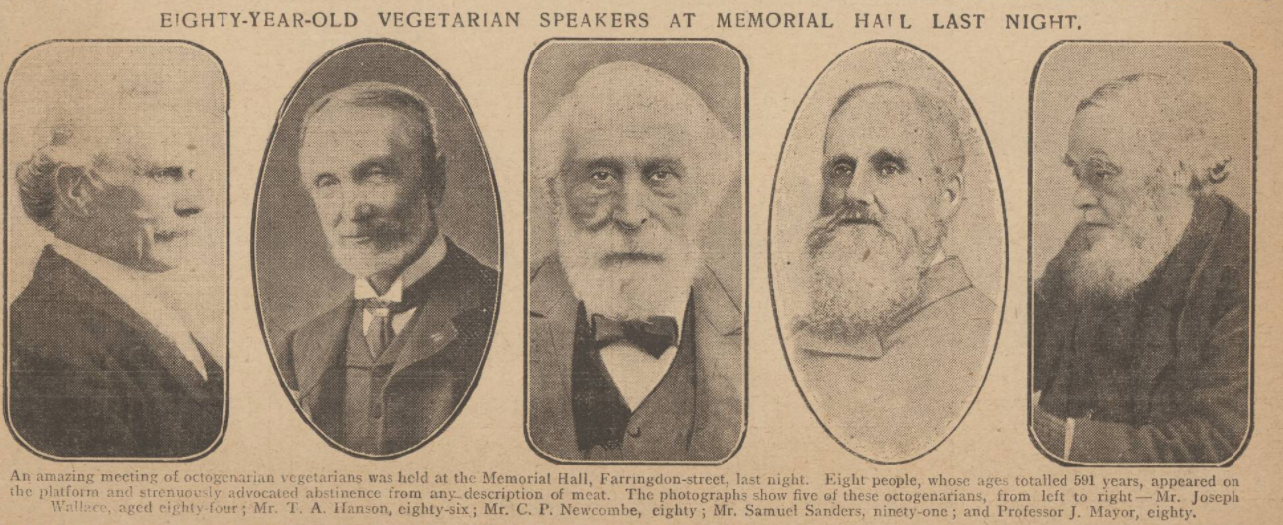
Vegetarian speakers at Memorial Hall, Farringdon Street, in 1905. From left to right: Joseph Wallace, T. A. Hanson, Newcombe, Samuel Sanders and Professor J. Mayor

Newcombe adopted a vegetarian diet around 1850. In 1895, he attended the autumn congress of the Vegetarian Federal Union in Birmingham.

In 1905, at the age of 80, Newcombe organised and presided over a meeting of vegetarian octogenarians in London. Speakers included Newcombe, Joseph Wallace (84), T. A. Hanson (86), John E. B. Mayor (80), Samuel Saunders (91), and Samuel Pitman (82), brother of Isaac Pitman.

Newcombe claimed that a strict vegetarian diet could cure cancer and published the pamphlet The Diet Cure of Cancer, which reached a third edition in 1905. In the pamphlet, he wrote that the adoption of vegetarianism would reduce disease and change human conduct:

not cancer alone, but the foul brood of diseases that fill the world with suffering and sorrow will rapidly decrease in number. Humanity will gain its right place among the religions of the world, the causes of war will cease, and cruelty will be known only as a crime.

In 1906, Newcombe sought funding for a Fruitarian Cancer Hospital.

In 1911, Newcombe published The Manifesto of Vegetarianism, dedicated to Mayor, Wallace, and Albert Broadbent. In the work, he argued that humans are naturally adapted to a vegetarian diet, citing the absence of claws or sharp teeth and the structure of the digestive system, which he regarded as unsuited to meat digestion.

In 1900, Newcombe contributed a story titled "What the Animals Think of the Children's Garden" to the vegetarian children's periodical The Children's Garden. The story depicts an animal gathering in which animals protest human cruelty and the use of their bodies for clothing and fashion, including the killing of seals for fur and the plucking of ostrich feathers.

Newcombe edited The Vegetarian Messenger and Health Review, the journal of the Vegetarian Society. In 1912, he invited correspondence on the divide between vegetarians who consumed animal products and those who did not. The resulting 24 letters were published in the journal. Newcombe criticised arguments for the use of eggs and milk, and advocated a diet consisting only of cereals, pulses, fruit, nuts, and vegetables.

=== Temperance work ===
Newcombe edited the temperance periodical The Temperance Gazette, published by William Horsell. He was a member of the National Temperance Association and worked as an agent for Temperance Emigration Shipping.

=== Personal life and death ===
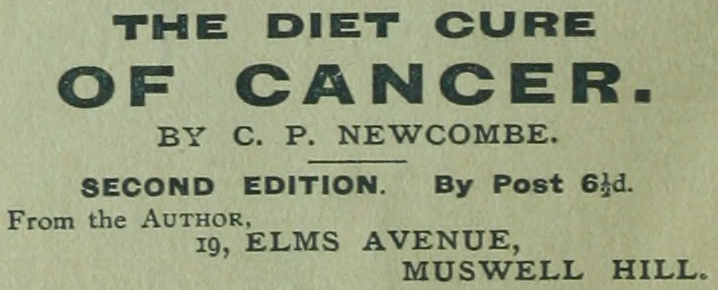
1904 advertisement for the second edition of Newcombe's The Diet Cure of Cancer

In 1848, Newcombe married Caroline Tunnicliff in Coventry. The couple had four children, including Alfred Cornelius Newcombe (1850–1944), who in 1921 published Vegetarianism Vindicated, a collection of his articles on vegetarianism that had originally appeared in the Middlesex County Times and The Epoch. Alfred worked as a civil engineer in British India and wrote further works, including Village, Town and Jungle Life in India (1905) and Rational Food (1909). He continued as an officer of the Vegetarian Society into the 1930s and edited the reform journal Humane Life at Bournemouth. Caroline died in 1857. The following year, Newcombe married Mary Kirk in Kensington. She died in 1882.

Newcombe died on 30 July 1913 in Rusthall, Kent, aged 87. He was cremated at Golders Green Crematorium. In his memory, the Vegetarian Society established the C. P. Newcombe Memorial Prize Essay Competition.

== Publications ==
- Alexandra Park College, Hornsey: Conducted by Mr. C. P. Newcombe Assisted by Competent Teachers & Lecturers. 1868. OCLC 1057325048.
- Health: Man's Birthright; an Address Delivered Before the Northern Heights Vegetarian Society, 1895. Ideal Publishing Union.
- "On Fish Eating". The Vegetarian. 4 (10): 145–150. 15 April 1899.
- "What the Animals Think of the Children's Garden". The Children's Garden (3). January 1900.
- Cancer: The Natural and Only Cure. 1903.
- The Diet Cure of Cancer. c. 1904.
- "Two Men I Have Met". The Vegetarian: 220–221. 3 December 1906.
- The Manifesto of Vegetarianism. London: Vegetarian Society. 1911.

== See also ==
- History of vegetarianism
- Vegetarianism in the Victorian era
- Vegetarianism in the United Kingdom
- Temperance movement in the United Kingdom
