= Samuel Saunders (journalist) =

New Zealand journalist and newspaper editor (1857–1943)

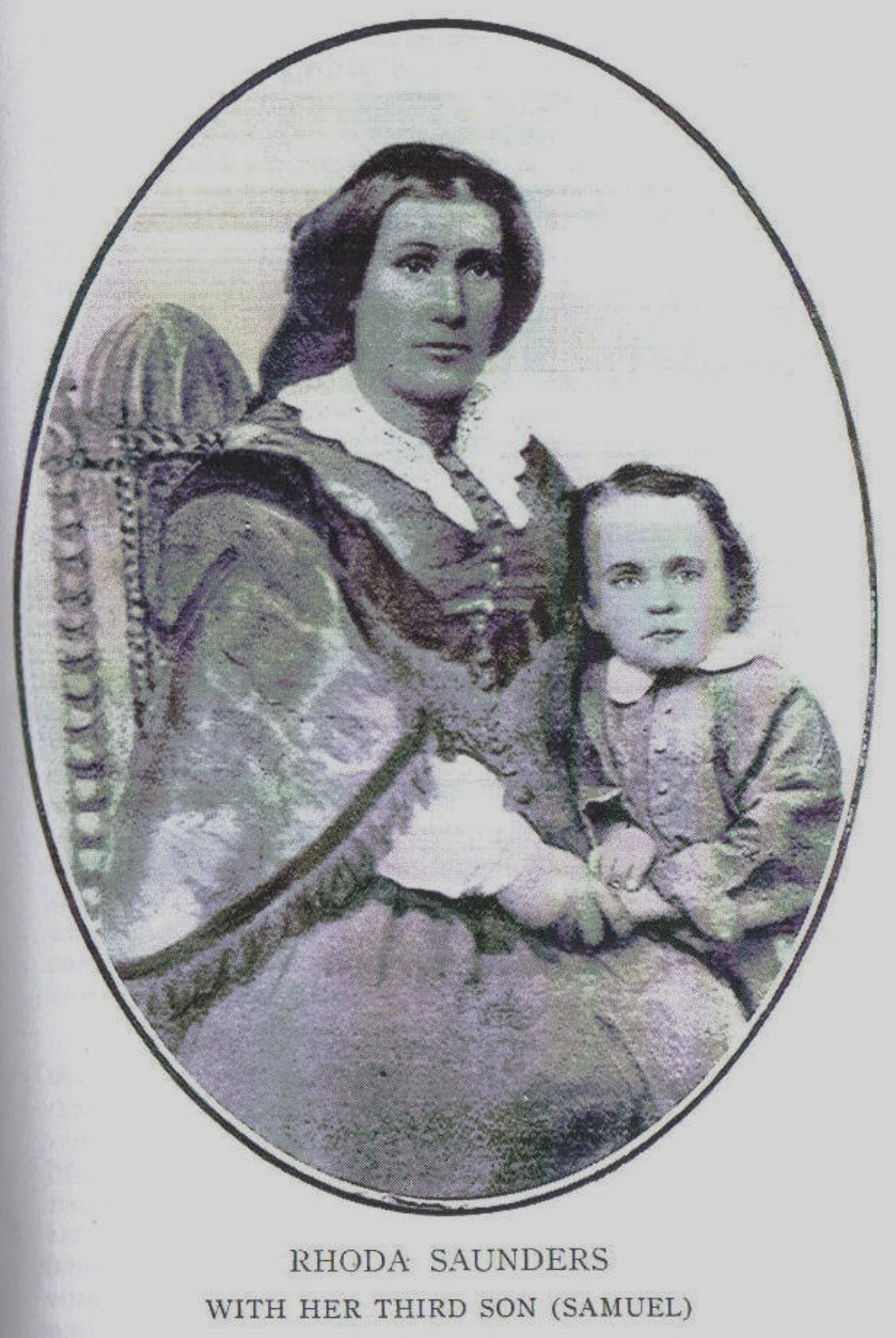
- Saunders with his mother. Date unknown.
- Born: 1857; Nelson, New Zealand
- Died: 1943 (aged 85–86); Eastbourne, New Zealand
- Occupations: Journalist, newspaper editor
- Spouse: Helen Johnston (m. 1880)
- Parents: Alfred Saunders; Rhoda Flower
- Relatives: Sarah Page (sister); Mary Bayley (aunt); William Saunders (uncle); Sarah McMurray (cousin); Robert Page (nephew); Samuel Saunders (uncle)

Samuel Saunders (1857–1943) was a New Zealand journalist and newspaper editor.

== Biography ==
Saunders was born in Nelson, New Zealand in 1857 to Rhoda Saunders (née Flower) and Alfred Saunders. His uncle was William Saunders and his sister was Sarah Page. In 1880 he married Helen Johnston who was a granddaughter of William Cargill.

He was editor of the Lyttelton Times from 1891 to 1914.

Saunders died in Eastbourne, New Zealand in 1943, aged 86.
