= Samuel Saunders (vegetarian) =

English social reformer and entrepreneur (1814–1908)

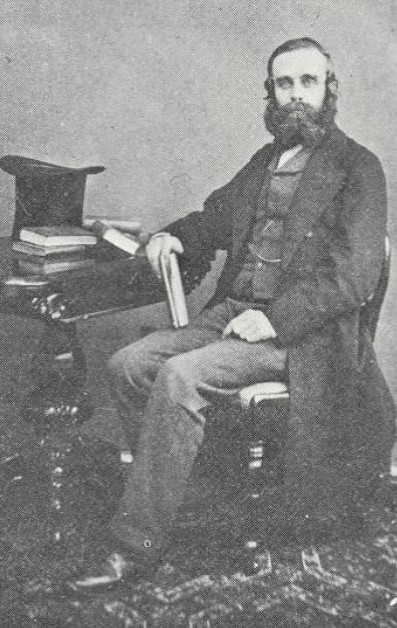
- Born: 12 August 1814; Russel Mill, Market Lavington, England
- Died: 2 March 1908 (aged 93); Market Lavington, England
- Occupations: Social reformer; activist; entrepreneur
- Spouses: Amelia Goulding Grimes (m. 1844; died 1848) Frances Maria Cotterell (m. 1855; died 1888) Constance Wilkinson (m. 1896)
- Children: 3
- Relatives: Mary Bayly (sister); Alfred Saunders (brother); William Saunders (brother); Samuel Saunders (nephew); Sarah Page (niece)
- Family: Saunders family

Samuel Saunders (12 August 1814 – 2 March 1908) was an English social reformer and entrepreneur. He was associated with several 19th-century reform movements, including the anti-slavery campaign, the Anti-Corn Law League, and municipal reform. He also supported temperance, vegetarianism, the peace movement, hydrotherapy, homeopathy, and anti-vaccination. Saunders worked as a master miller, farmer and manufacturing chemist, and later operated a fruit-preserving business.

== Biography ==
=== Early life and family ===
Samuel Saunders was born on 12 August 1814 at Russel Mill, Market Lavington. He was the son of Amran Edward Saunders (1779–1849), a grain merchant and miller, and Mary Ann Saunders (née Box; 1788–1874), who had four sons and six daughters.

His siblings included Mary Bayly (1816–1899), a temperance activist and writer; Alfred Saunders (1820–1905), a farmer, social reformer and activist; and William Saunders (1823–1895), a newspaper proprietor and Member of Parliament for Hull and Walworth.

His nephew was Samuel Saunders (1857–1943), a journalist and newspaper editor, and his niece was Sarah Page (1863–1950), a teacher, feminist, reformer and politician.

=== Reform work ===
Saunders became involved in reform movements as a young man. By the age of 20, he was involved in the Anti-Slavery Society, the Anti-Corn Law League, and support for the Municipal Reform Bill. Saunders became a teetotaller in 1830 and joined the British and Foreign Temperance Society in the same year. He enlisted his mother, two sisters and three brothers in the temperance cause. In 1832, during the Bristol riots, he was sworn in as a special constable.

Saunders adopted vegetarianism in 1837 after meeting Isaac Pitman and reading works by Sylvester Graham. He worked with Pitman in the vegetarian cause in Bath around 1847.

Saunders was also active in the peace movement, joining the International Peace Society in 1832. He was involved in the anti-vaccination movement and promoted hydrotherapy and homeopathy, claiming to have achieved cures through these methods.

=== Business career ===
Saunders worked as a master miller and farmer. In 1848, his father divided the family grain merchant business into two branches: a branch in Bath, run by Samuel's brothers Edward and John, and a new business in Market Lavington, operated by Samuel. Samuel's business operated from 1848 to 1852. While living in Bath, he became a manufacturing chemist. Saunders later turned to fruit farming and, in 1868, founded a fruit-preserving business in Market Lavington that avoided artificial colourings and chemicals.

=== Publishing ===
Saunders assisted his brother William in establishing several publications, including the Western Morning News in Plymouth, the Eastern Morning News in Hull, and the Central Press in London. He also contributed to the Central News after the government's takeover of the telegraph service.

=== Later years ===
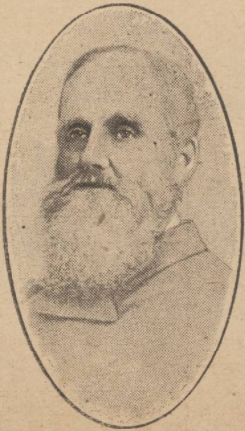
Saunders, c. 1905

Saunders established a Working Men's Hall in Market Lavington and built his own home with attention to ventilation and hygiene.

In 1897, he attended the Vegetarian Society jubilee meeting in Ramsgate, where his work for vegetarianism and social reform was recognised. In 1903, he stated:

I am now an old man. I have been a total abstainer from alcoholic drinks for 72 years. I have never touched tobacco and have never spent a penny on either. I have abstained from flesh, fish, and fowl for 62 years, and have followed other health rules. I have never had a headache, never been in bed a whole day from illness, or suffered pain except from trivial accidents. I have had a very happy, and I hope somewhat useful, life. Now, in my 88th year, I am as light and nimble, and capable of receiving a new idea, as I was 20 years ago.

In October 1905, a meeting was held at Congregational Memorial Hall, London, for octogenarian vegetarians. Speakers included Saunders (then aged 91), Joseph Wallace, T. A. Hanson, C. P. Newcombe, John E. B. Mayor, and Samuel Pitman, brother of Isaac Pitman.

=== Personal life and death ===
Saunders was married three times. He married Amelia Goulding Grimes on 4 September 1844 at Abbey Church, Romsey; she died in 1848. On 17 October 1855, he married Frances "Fanny" Maria Cotterell; she died in 1888. On 4 September 1896, he married Constance Wilkinson, widow of Perceval Wilkinson. He had three daughters: Alice, Edith and Annette.

Saunders died in Market Lavington on 2 March 1908, aged 93.
