= Sarah Page (prohibitionist) =

New Zealand teacher, feminist, prohibitionist, socialist, social reformer (1863–1950)

- Born: Sarah Saunders; 26 August 1863; Waimea South, New Zealand
- Died: 20 January 1950 (aged 86)
- Other names: Sarah Saunders Page
- Spouse: Samuel Page (m. 1896; died 1944)
- Children: two, including Robert Page
- Parents: Alfred Saunders; Rhoda Flower
- Relatives: Samuel Saunders (brother); Sarah McMurray (cousin); Mary Bayley (aunt); William Saunders (uncle); Samuel Saunders (uncle)

Sarah Page (née Saunders; 26 August 1863 – 20 January 1950), also known as Sarah Saunders Page, was a New Zealand teacher, feminist, prohibitionist, socialist, social reformer, and politician.

== Early life and family ==
Sarah Saunders was born in Waimea South, Nelson, New Zealand in 1863. She was one of ten children of Rhoda Saunders (née Flower) and Alfred Saunders, a radical politician, and grew up surrounded by Quakers. Her brother was the journalist Samuel Saunders (1857–1943). Sarah McMurray, a woodcarver and craftswoman, was Sarah Page's cousin through her mother's sister, Susannah Silcock (née Flower).

In 1896, she married Samuel Page, who was a science demonstrator at Canterbury Museum and like herself a Quaker. They were to have two sons, including Robert Page.

== Politics ==
With Ada Wells, she was a dominating influence on the Canterbury Women's Institute. She was also active with the National Council of Women of New Zealand and was the organisation's secretary in 1905–06. She was an ardent critic of conscription and upset Prime Minister William Massey and the Minister of Internal Affairs, George Warren Russell, with her criticism. Her son Robert Page was a conscientious objector and was imprisoned in 1918.

Standing for the Labour Party, she failed to get elected to the Christchurch City Council in the 1919 local elections. The three candidates elected in the St Albans ward, which included John Beanland and Ernest Andrews, were all from the right-leaning Citizens Association. Page was elected to the North Canterbury Hospital Board in 1922. When the Labour Party developed into a strong party in the 1920s, Page's extreme left views became less accepted and her influence faded.

== Death ==
She died on 20 January 1950 and is buried at Sydenham Cemetery next to her husband, who died in 1944. She bequeathed £2,000 to the Canterbury University College's chemistry department where her husband had been employed.
