= T. Anderson Hanson =

English merchant and social reformer (1819–1912)

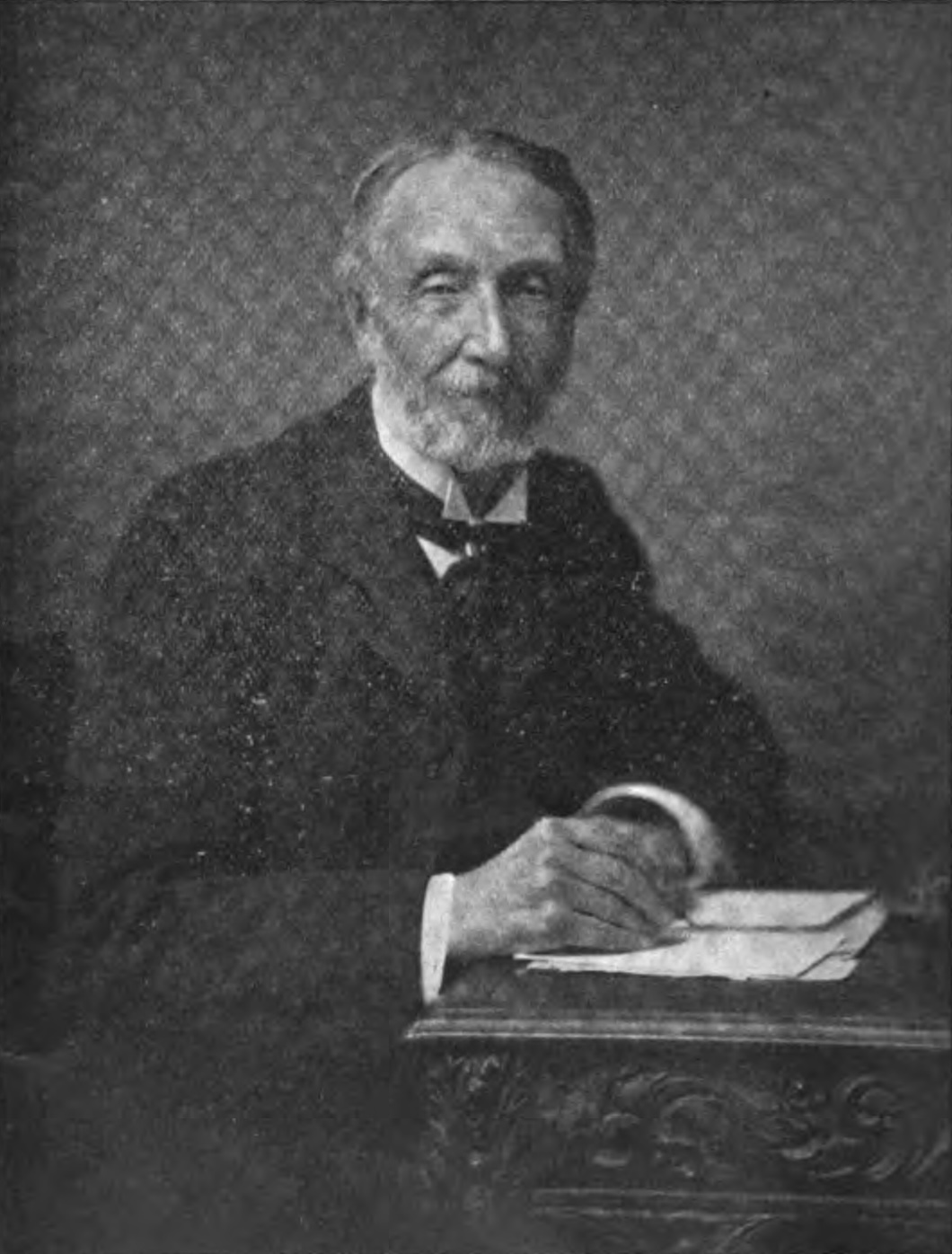
- Hanson, c. 1899
- Born: Thomas Anderson Hanson; 20 June 1819; Wilsden, Yorkshire, England
- Died: 21 April 1912 (aged 92); Brondesbury, London, England
- Occupations: Merchant; social reformer
- Known for: Temperance and vegetarianism activism
- Spouse: Sarah Ann Beaumont (m. 1844)
- Children: 2

Thomas Anderson Hanson (20 June 1819 – 21 April 1912) was an English merchant and social reformer. He worked for his father's stuff merchant firm, George Hanson and Sons, before establishing his own company, T. A. Hanson and Co., which declared bankruptcy in 1850. He was later a proprietor of the Abbotsbury Railway Company.

Hanson was active in the temperance and vegetarianism movements. He served as president of the Northern Section of the New Church Temperance Society, vice-president of the Vegetarian Society, and honorary secretary of the Vegetarian Federal Union. In 1881, while following a vegetarian diet, he travelled nearly 10,000 miles through Europe, North Africa, and the Middle East, including Spain, Egypt, the Holy Land, and Constantinople.

== Biography ==
=== Early life and education ===
Thomas Anderson Hanson was born in Wilsden, Yorkshire, on 20 June 1819 and baptised on 1 July. His parents were George and Elizabeth Hanson. He was educated at home and at a boarding school. At the age of 14, he attended school in Hamburg, Germany.

=== Business career ===
Hanson worked for his father's company, George Hanson and Sons, a firm of stuff merchants. He represented his father in northern Germany, where he became fluent in French and German. His father's company was dissolved on 26 April 1845 and divided into two firms. George Hanson and Sons, run by his father and brothers John and George, continued the worsted manufacturing business in Wilsden. T. A. Hanson and Co., run by Hanson, took over the stuff merchant operations in Bradford. In 1850, Hanson declared bankruptcy.

In the 1860s, Hanson worked as a stuff merchant in Manchester. By 1877, he was among the proprietors of the newly incorporated Abbotsbury Railway Company under the Abbotsbury Railway Act, which authorised the proprietors to construct, maintain and manage the railway, and to acquire and dispose of property for it.

=== Temperance and vegetarianism ===
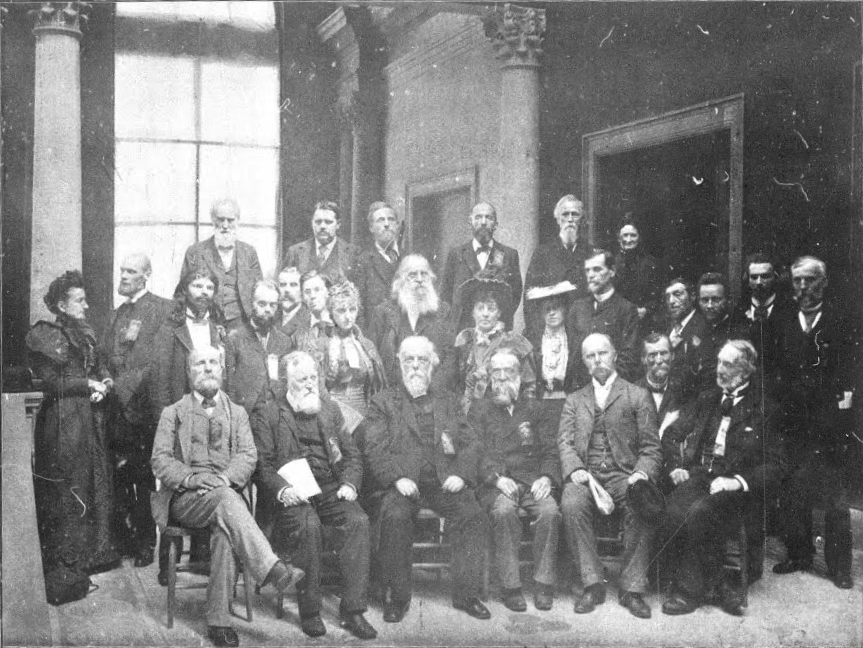
Vegetarian delegates at the 1893 Chicago World's Fair; Hanson seated front right

Hanson took a teetotal pledge around 1842. He took part in the temperance movement and served as president of the Northern Section of the New Church (Swedenborgian) Temperance Society and the Band of Hope.

Following a railway accident in March 1853, Hanson suffered from sciatica. After attending a lecture on vegetarianism by James Simpson, he adopted a vegetarian diet and later said that his health recovered after six months. He resumed eating meat because of social pressure and said that he then suffered from liver problems for 25 years. After reading Sylvester Graham's Science of Human Life, he again adopted vegetarianism and said that his liver problems ceased.

Hanson represented the Vegetarian Society in London in 1885 for one year. He also served as vice-president of the society and edited its periodical, The Dietetic Reformer and Vegetarian Messenger. He later became honorary secretary of the Vegetarian Federal Union. In 1893, Hanson attended the Chicago Vegetarian Congress as a delegate to the World's Fair in Chicago. He later served as treasurer of the Union and, with May Yates, as a representative of the Vegetarian Society of America in the Union's councils.

In his later years, Hanson delivered lectures on vegetarianism in London. In October 1905, a meeting for octogenarian vegetarians was held at Congregational Memorial Hall, London. Speakers included Hanson, then aged 86, Joseph Wallace, C. P. Newcombe, John E. B. Mayor, Samuel Saunders, and Samuel Pitman, brother of Isaac Pitman.

=== Travels ===
Hanson travelled through much of Europe, but did not visit Württemberg, Bavaria, or Serbia. He was present in Hamburg during the Great Fire of 1842. In Carthage, he assisted the archaeologist Nathan Davis with packing artefacts and, in 1874, visited the World's Fair. In 1881, while following a vegetarian diet, he travelled through Spain, Portugal, Algeria, and Egypt, with stops in Tunis and Malta, followed by visits to the Holy Land, Syria, Athens, Constantinople, and Odessa. His route continued through Bessarabia, Romania, Hungary, Austria, Bohemia, and Saxony, covering nearly 10,000 miles. On his way to Chicago in 1893, he visited New York, Philadelphia, and Washington; on his return journey, he visited Niagara, Albany, Saratoga, and Boston.

=== Personal life and death ===
Hanson lived in Bradford, Chorlton-on-Medlock, and London. On 11 June 1844, he married Sarah Ann Beaumont at Eastbrook Chapel, Bradford. They had two daughters, Louisa Mary (1847–1916) and Catherine (born 1850).

Hanson died in Brondesbury, London, on 21 April 1912, aged 92.

== Publications ==
- "Dr. Mussey's Visit to England", Food, Home and Garden (1889), pp. 117–118
- "Life Assurance", The Dietetic Reformer (1885), pp. 186–188
- "To Chicago!", The Vegetarian (1893)
