= John E. B. Mayor =

English scholar, writer and activist (1825–1910)

John E. B. Mayor FBA
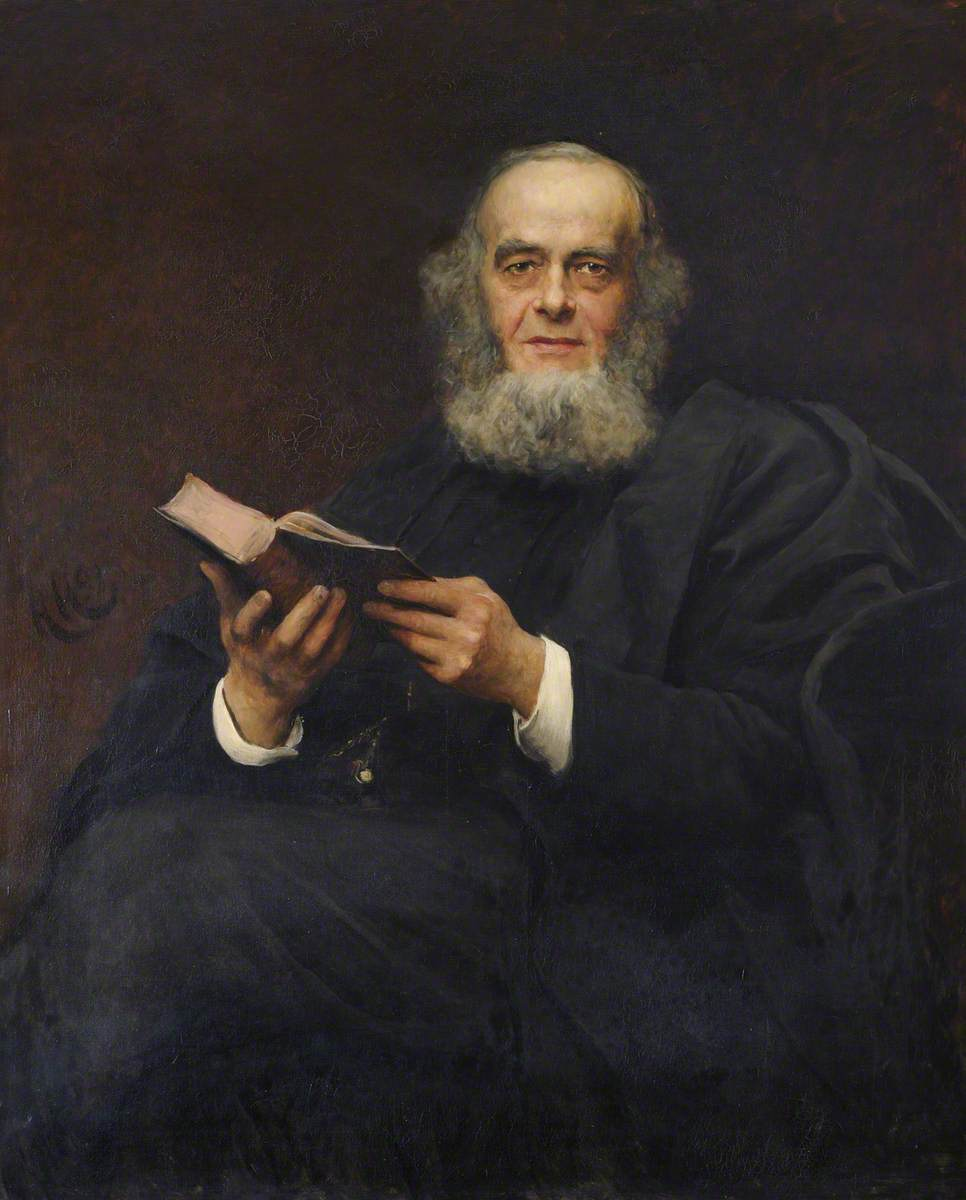
- 1891 portrait by Hubert von Herkomer
- Born: John Eyton Bickersteth Mayor; 28 January 1825; Baddegama, British Ceylon
- Died: 1 December 1910 (aged 85); Cambridge, England
- Resting place: Ascension Parish Burial Ground
- Education: Shrewsbury School; St John's College, Cambridge
- Occupations: Classical scholar; writer; vegetarianism activist
- Relatives: Joseph Bickersteth Mayor (brother); Henry Bickersteth (uncle); Edward Bickersteth (uncle)

Signature
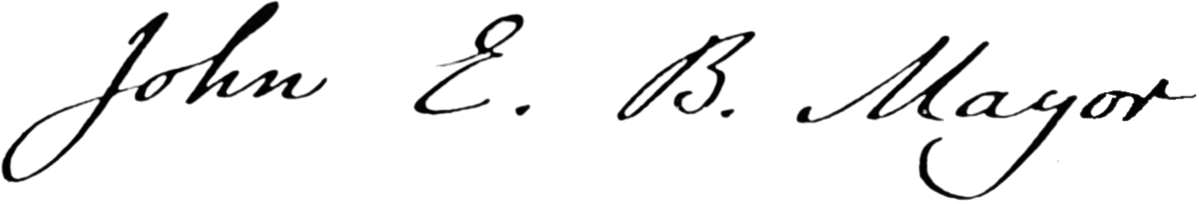

John Eyton Bickersteth Mayor FBA (28 January 1825 – 1 December 1910) was an English classical scholar, writer and vegetarianism activist. He was Cambridge University Librarian from 1863 to 1867 and Kennedy Professor of Latin at the University of Cambridge from 1872 until his death. His publications included editions of Juvenal, Cicero, John Fisher, Roger Ascham and other Latin and English texts. Mayor was president of the Vegetarian Society from 1884 to 1910 and wrote pamphlets and books on vegetarianism and temperance.

== Biography ==
=== Early life and education ===
Mayor was born at Baddegama, British Ceylon (now Sri Lanka), on 28 January 1825, the son of the Rev. Robert Mayor and Charlotte Bickersteth. His mother belonged to the Bickersteth family and was the sister of Henry Bickersteth, 1st Baron Langdale, and the Rev. Edward Bickersteth. Joseph Bickersteth Mayor was his younger brother. Mayor was sent to England to be educated at Shrewsbury School and St John's College, Cambridge.

=== Career ===
From 1863 to 1867, Mayor was librarian of the University of Cambridge. In 1872, he succeeded H. A. J. Munro as Kennedy Professor of Latin, a post he held until his death in 1910. His edition of the thirteen Satires of Juvenal was known for its extensive illustrative quotations. His Bibliographical Clue to Latin Literature (1875), based on Emil Hübner's Grundriss zu Vorlesungen über die römische Litteraturgeschichte, was used by students of Latin literature, and his edition of Cicero's Second Philippic was widely used.

Mayor also edited the English works of John Fisher, Bishop of Rochester (1876); Thomas Baker's History of St John's College, Cambridge (1869); Richard of Cirencester's Speculum historiale de gestis regum Angliae 447–1066 (1863–1869); Roger Ascham's Schoolmaster (new ed., 1883); the Latin Heptateuch (1889); and the Journal of Philology.

According to the Enciklopedio de Esperanto, Mayor learned Esperanto in 1907 and gave a speech against Esperanto reform at the World Congress of Esperanto held at Cambridge.

=== Vegetarianism ===
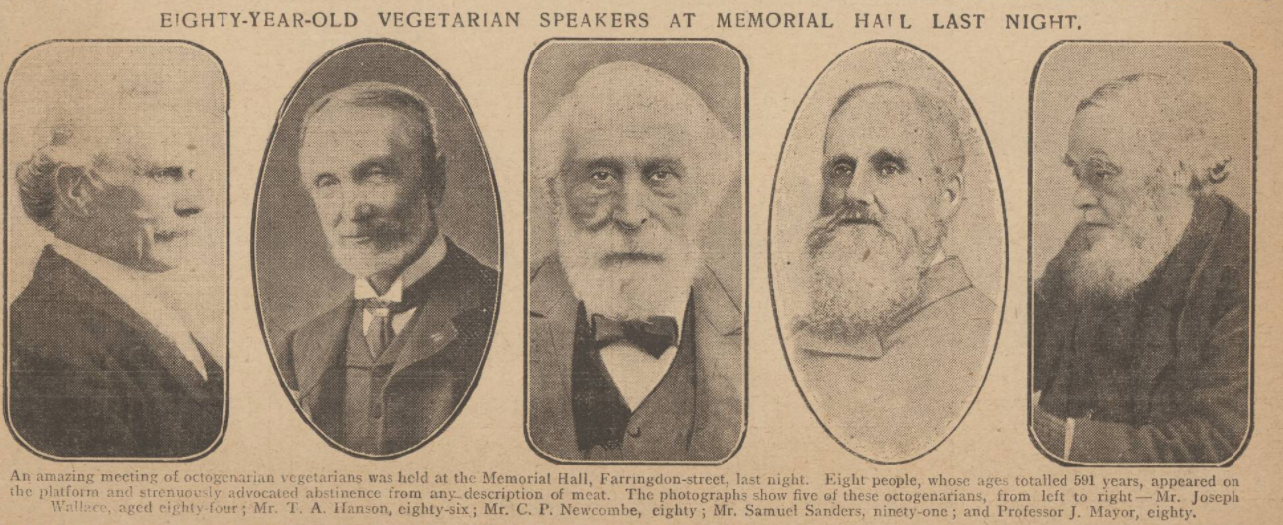
Vegetarian speakers at Memorial Hall, Farringdon Street in 1905. Mayor is pictured on the far right.

Mayor succeeded Francis William Newman as president of the Vegetarian Society in 1884 and remained in that position until his death. He was a strict vegetarian and teetotaller, but it was noted that "he never sought to impose his rule of abstinence on others". Mayor authored What is Vegetarianism? in 1886. His vegetarian writings were published in Plain Living and High Thinking in 1897.

In October 1905, a meeting was held at Congregational Memorial Hall, London, for octogenarian vegetarians. Speakers in attendance included Mayor, then aged 84; Joseph Wallace; T. A. Hanson; C. P. Newcombe; Samuel Saunders; and Samuel Pitman, brother of Isaac Pitman.

Mayor ate a strict vegetarian diet and lived off twopence a day. His diet consisted of bread, fruit, porridge and vegetables, with lemonade as his only drink.

=== Death ===
Mayor died on 1 December 1910 in Cambridge. He is buried in the Ascension Parish Burial Ground in Cambridge.

== Publications ==
- Nicholas Ferrar: Two Lives (1855)
- Early statutes of the College of St. John at Cambridge in the University of Cambridge (1859)
- Advent Warnings: a Sermon (1863)
- History of the College of St. John the Evangelist, Cambridge (with Thomas Baker, 1869)
- Affiliation of Local Colleges to the Universities of Oxford and Cambridge (1874)
- Bibliographical Clue to Latin Literature (1875)
- Modicus Cibi Medicus Sibi, Or, Nature Her Own Physician (1880)
- What is Vegetarianism? (1886)
- The Church and the Life of the Poor (1889)
- The Latin Heptateuch (1889)
- Thirteen Satires of Juvenal (1889)
- Spain, Portugal: the Bible (1892)
- Plain Living and High Thinking (1897)
- Mercy, Not Curiosity, the Mother of Medicine (1898)
- The Name Vegetarian (c. 1900)
- Cambridge Under Queen Anne (1911)
- Twelve Cambridge Sermons (1911)

== Notes ==
Academic offices
Preceded by Hugh Andrew Johnstone Munro	Kennedy Professor of Latin Cambridge University; 1872–1910	Succeeded by A.E. Housman
