= Joseph Wallace (vegetarian) =

Irish vegetarianism activist (c. 1821–1910)

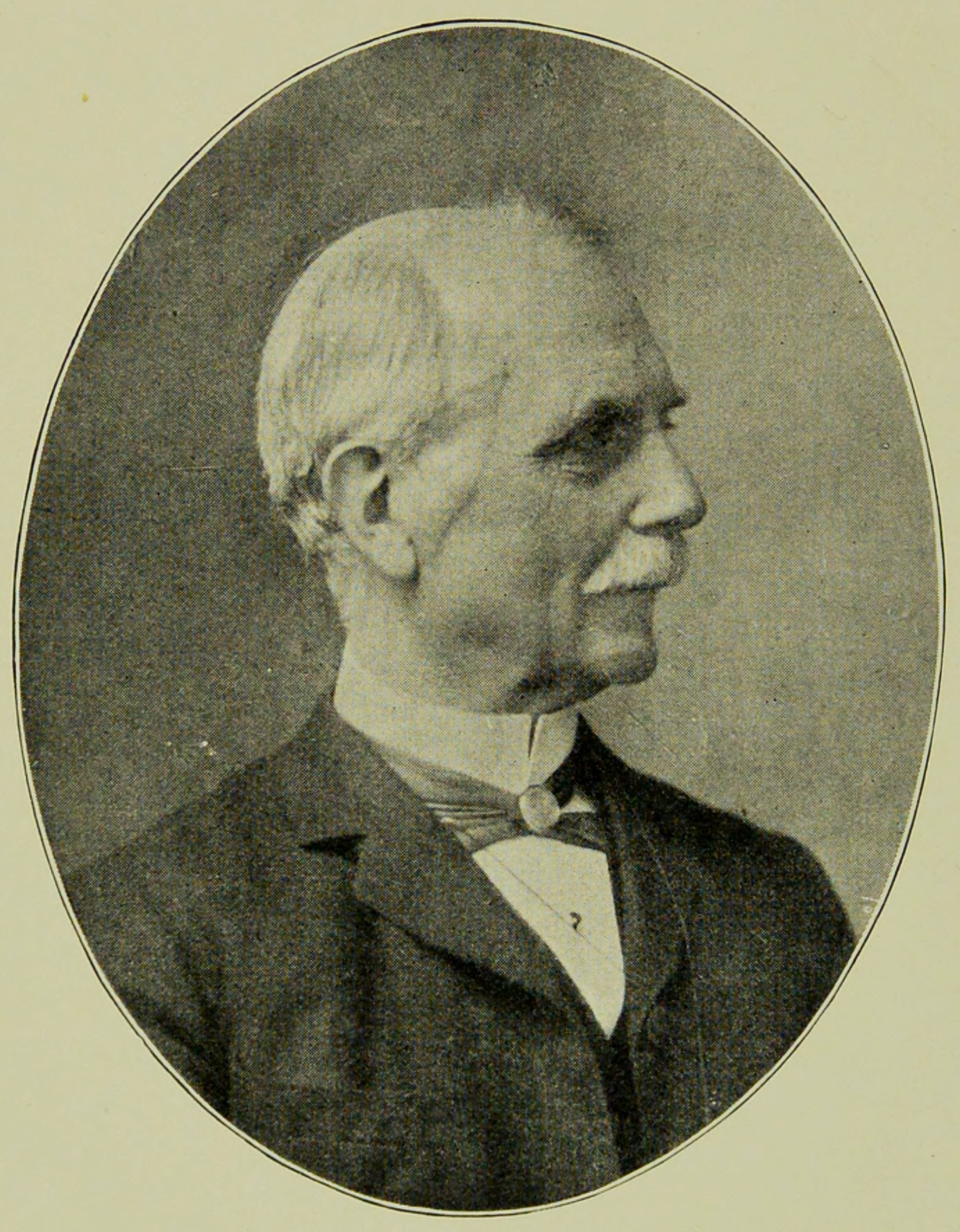
- Portrait from Fifty Years of Food Reform (1898)
- Born: c. 1821; Ireland
- Died: 29 April 1910 (aged 89); London, England
- Resting place: Brookwood Cemetery
- Other name: Lex et Lux
- Occupations: Alternative medicine practitioner; patent medicine creator; writer; activist
- Known for: Vegetarianism and anti-vaccination activism
- Spouse: Chandos Leigh Hunt (m. 1878)
- Children: 7

Joseph Wallace (c. 1821 – 29 April 1910) was an Irish-British alternative medicine practitioner, patent medicine creator, writer and activist. He promoted the "Wallace system", a regimen based on a vegetarian diet without fermented foods, and sold patent medicines while offering consultations. With his wife, Chandos Leigh Hunt, he co-authored Physianthropy (1885) under the pseudonym Lex et Lux.

== Biography ==
Wallace first worked in malting and distilling. He later devised the "Wallace system", which he described as a method for the cure and eradication of disease. The system used a vegetarian diet without fermented foods; its adherents were known as "Wallaceites". Wallace patented, prepared and sold medicines, and provided consultations.

In 1878, Wallace married Chandos Leigh Hunt, who had been his patient and pupil. In 1885, they co-authored Physianthropy: Or, the Home Cure and Eradication of Disease, using the pseudonym "Lex et Lux".

In October 1905, Wallace attended a meeting at Congregational Memorial Hall, London, for octogenarian vegetarians. Speakers included Wallace, then aged 84, C. P. Newcombe, T. A. Hanson, Samuel Saunders, John E. B. Mayor and Samuel Pitman, brother of Isaac Pitman.

Wallace died at Russell Square, London, on 29 April 1910, aged 89. He was buried at Brookwood Cemetery on 3 May.

== Legacy ==
Wallace and his wife were profiled in Charles W. Forward's Fifty Years of Food Reform: A History of the Vegetarian Movement in England (1898). Rollo Russell cited Wallace's dietary recommendations in the "Medical Testimony" section of his 1906 book Strength and Diet. C. P. Newcombe's The Manifesto of Vegetarianism (1911) contains a memorial dedication to Wallace.

== Publications ==
- Physianthropy: Or, the Home Cure and Eradication of Disease (as Lex et Lux; with C. Leigh Hunt Wallace; 1885)
- Wallace's Complete Series of Twelve Specific Remedies for the Absolute Eradication of All Diseases, etc. (1885)
- Fermentation: The Primary Cause of Disease in Man and Animals
- Cholera: Its Prevention and Home Cure
- The Necessity of Smallpox as an Eradicator of Organic Disease
