= Eastern Morning News =

- Type: Daily newspaper
- Founder: William Saunders
- Founded: 26 January 1864 (issue 1)
- Ceased publication: 8 November 1929
- Political alignment: Independent
- Language: English
- Headquarters: Kingston upon Hull

The Eastern Morning News was a newspaper based in Kingston upon Hull, East Riding of Yorkshire, England. Founded by William Saunders in 1864, it ceased publication in November 1929.

== History ==
The Eastern Morning News was founded in 1864 by Liberal politician William Saunders, it was Hull's first daily paper. The paper was a substantial and serious publication, independent but with Liberal leanings, covering both local and world news, with coverage of finance and shipping, and with editorial comment, intended for an informed or professional audience.

The launch of the BBC's radio news service as well as the 1930s recession contributed to the end of publication of the paper and its Saturday sister publication the Hull News on 8 November 1929; the publishing company re-focused on the publication of an enlarged edition of the Hull Evening News, which ceased publication in 1930, taken over by a rival; the more financially secure and Conservative biased Daily Mail.

== See also ==
- Western Morning News, covering south-west England, also founded by William Saunders
