= Sam Saunders (politician) =

American politician (1905–2005)

S. D. "Sam" Saunders
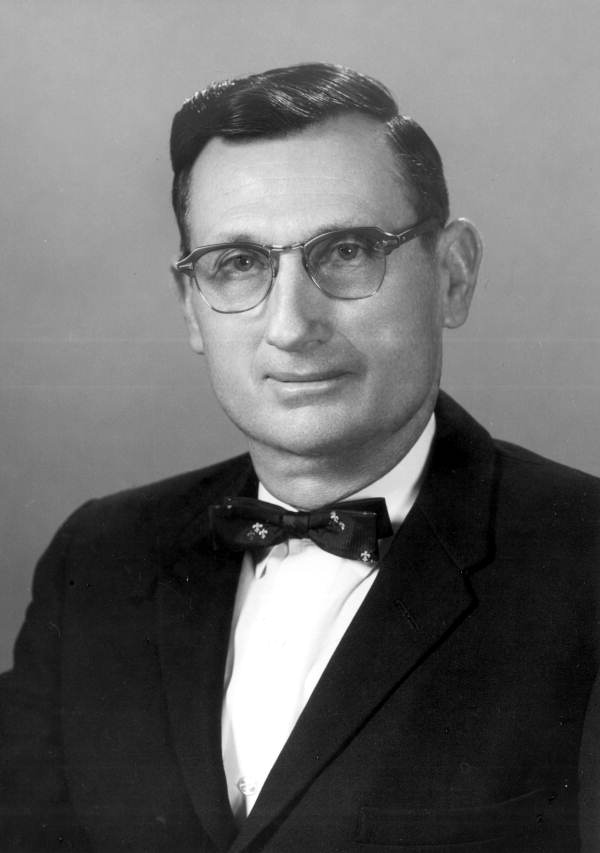

Member of the Florida House of Representatives
- In office 1949–1964

Personal details
- Born: December 17, 1905 Penney Farms, Florida
- Died: September 30, 2005 (aged 99) Middleburg, Florida
- Party: Democratic
- Spouse(s): Lillian; Rebecca
- Children: three
- Occupation: rancher

Samuel David Saunders (December 17, 1905 – September 30, 2005) was an American politician in the state of Florida.

Saunders was born at Penney Farms, Florida, in 1905 to Mary Ann Conway and McQueen Saunders. He was a rancher from Green Cove Springs, Florida. He served in the Florida House of Representatives from 1949 to 1964 (Clay County).
