= Arthur O'Callaghan =

New Zealand politician

New Zealand Parliament
| Years | Term | Electorate | Party |
|---|---|---|---|
| 1881–1884 | 8th | Lincoln | Independent |
| 1884–1887 | 9th | Lincoln | Independent |
| 1887–1888 | 10th | Lincoln | Independent |

Arthur Pyne O'Callaghan (1 March 1837 – 17 December 1930) was a 19th-century Member of Parliament from Canterbury, New Zealand.

He was born in Fermoy, Ireland, on 1 March 1837.

He represented the Lincoln electorate from 1881 to 1888, when he resigned.

O'Callaghan died in Eketāhuna on 17 December 1930, and was buried at Mangaoranga Eketāhuna Cemetery.

New Zealand Parliament
| New constituency | Member of Parliament for Lincoln; 1881–1888 | Succeeded by Alfred Saunders |
