= Springston =

- Rural settlement
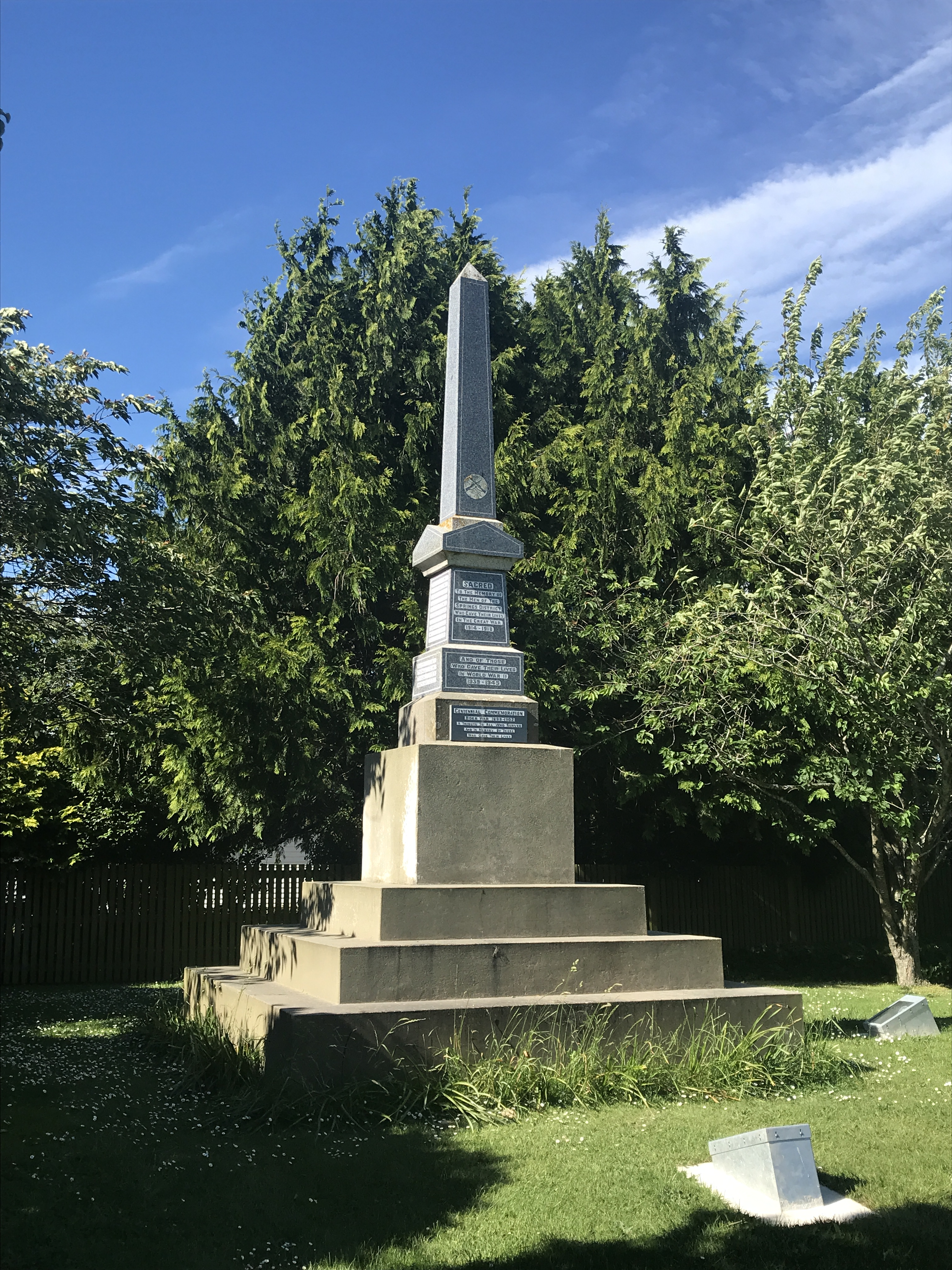
- War memorial in Springston
- Interactive map of Springston
- Coordinates: 43°38′S 172°25′E
- Country: New Zealand
- Region: Canterbury
- Territorial authority: Selwyn District
- Ward: Springs
- Electorates: Selwyn; Te Tai Tonga (Māori)

Government
  - Territorial authority: Selwyn District Council
  - Regional council: Environment Canterbury
  - Mayor of Selwyn: Lydia Gliddon
  - Selwyn MP: Nicola Grigg
  - Te Tai Tonga MP: Tākuta Ferris

Area
  - Total: 0.37 km^{2} (0.14 sq mi)

Population (June 2025)
  - Total: 540
  - Density: 1,500/km^{2} (3,800/sq mi)
- Time zone: UTC+12 (New Zealand Standard Time)
  - Summer (DST): UTC+13 (New Zealand Daylight Time)

Springston is a small rural Canterbury town in the South Island of New Zealand.

Springston was developed around the mid-19th century, beginning with the establishment of Spring Station by James E. FitzGerald, who farmed there from 1853 to 1857, and then again from 1860 to 1867. The first building in the village was a Methodist church, which opened in 1866 (replaced by a second building in 1873). Walter Lawry, who emigrated with his wife and 10 children to New Zealand in 1862, was Methodist preacher in Springston for 50 years.

St Mary's Church, which opened in 1875, was one of the earliest Anglican churches in Canterbury. Clergyman Harry Stocker, newly arrived from Ireland, helped organise subscriptions and donations to fund the building of both it and St Paul's in Tai Tapu (1876). Both churches were designed by Christchurch architect Frederick Strouts, who later designed Ivey Hall at Lincoln University.

The George Roy Store was formerly known as Howard and Dartnall, a store established in 1874 by Harry Lloyd Dartnall in partnership with his relative Mr. Howard. Other historic buildings include the Springston Hotel, the original Methodist parsonage, and four cottages over 100 years old.

The Springston rugby grounds at the Domain hold rugby cricket and tennis for locals and surrounding residents. The Springston Pony Club started the South Island's Springston Trophy in 1976. Springston has a pub, dairy, and community hall on Leeston Road.

== Demographics ==
Springston is described by Statistics New Zealand as a rural settlement. It covers 0.37 km^{2} (0.14 sq mi). It had an estimated population of 540 as of June 2025, with a population density of 1,459 people per km^{2}. It is part of the larger Springston statistical area.

Historical population for the Springston settlement
Year	Pop.	±% p.a.
2006	351	—
2013	507	+5.39%
2018	531	+0.93%
2023	528	−0.11%

The settlement had a population of 528 in the 2023 New Zealand census, a decrease of 3 people (−0.6%) since the 2018 census, and an increase of 21 people (4.1%) since the 2013 census. There were 270 males, 252 females, and 6 people of other genders in 183 dwellings. 3.4% of people identified as LGBTIQ+. The median age was 40.6 years (compared with 38.1 years nationally). There were 111 people (21.0%) aged under 15 years, 87 (16.5%) aged 15 to 29, 255 (48.3%) aged 30 to 64, and 72 (13.6%) aged 65 or older.

People could identify as more than one ethnicity. The results were 95.5% European (Pākehā); 9.7% Māori; 2.8% Pasifika; 2.8% Asian; 1.1% Middle Eastern, Latin American and African New Zealanders (MELAA); and 2.3% other, which includes people giving their ethnicity as "New Zealander". English was spoken by 97.7%, Māori by 1.7%, Samoan by 0.6%, and other languages by 8.5%. No language could be spoken by 1.7% (e.g. too young to talk). New Zealand Sign Language was known by 0.6%. The percentage of people born overseas was 19.9, compared with 28.8% nationally.

Religious affiliations were 29.0% Christian, 0.6% Buddhist, 0.6% New Age, and 1.7% other religions. People who answered that they had no religion were 58.5%, and 8.5% of people did not answer the census question.

Of those at least 15 years old, 102 (24.5%) people had a bachelor's or higher degree, 237 (56.8%) had a post-high school certificate or diploma, and 72 (17.3%) people exclusively held high school qualifications. The median income was $50,400, compared with $41,500 nationally. 57 people (13.7%) earned over $100,000 compared to 12.1% nationally. The employment status of those at least 15 was 228 (54.7%) full-time, 75 (18.0%) part-time, and 6 (1.4%) unemployed.

=== Springston statistical area ===
Springston statistical area surrounds and includes the settlement and covers 118.27 km^{2} (45.66 sq mi). It had an estimated population of 2,210 as of June 2025, with a population density of 18.7 people per km^{2}.

Historical population for the statistical area
Year	Pop.	±% p.a.
2006	1,653	—
2013	2,022	+2.92%
2018	2,142	+1.16%
2023	2,118	−0.23%
The 2006 population is for a larger area of 119.12 km^{2}. Source:

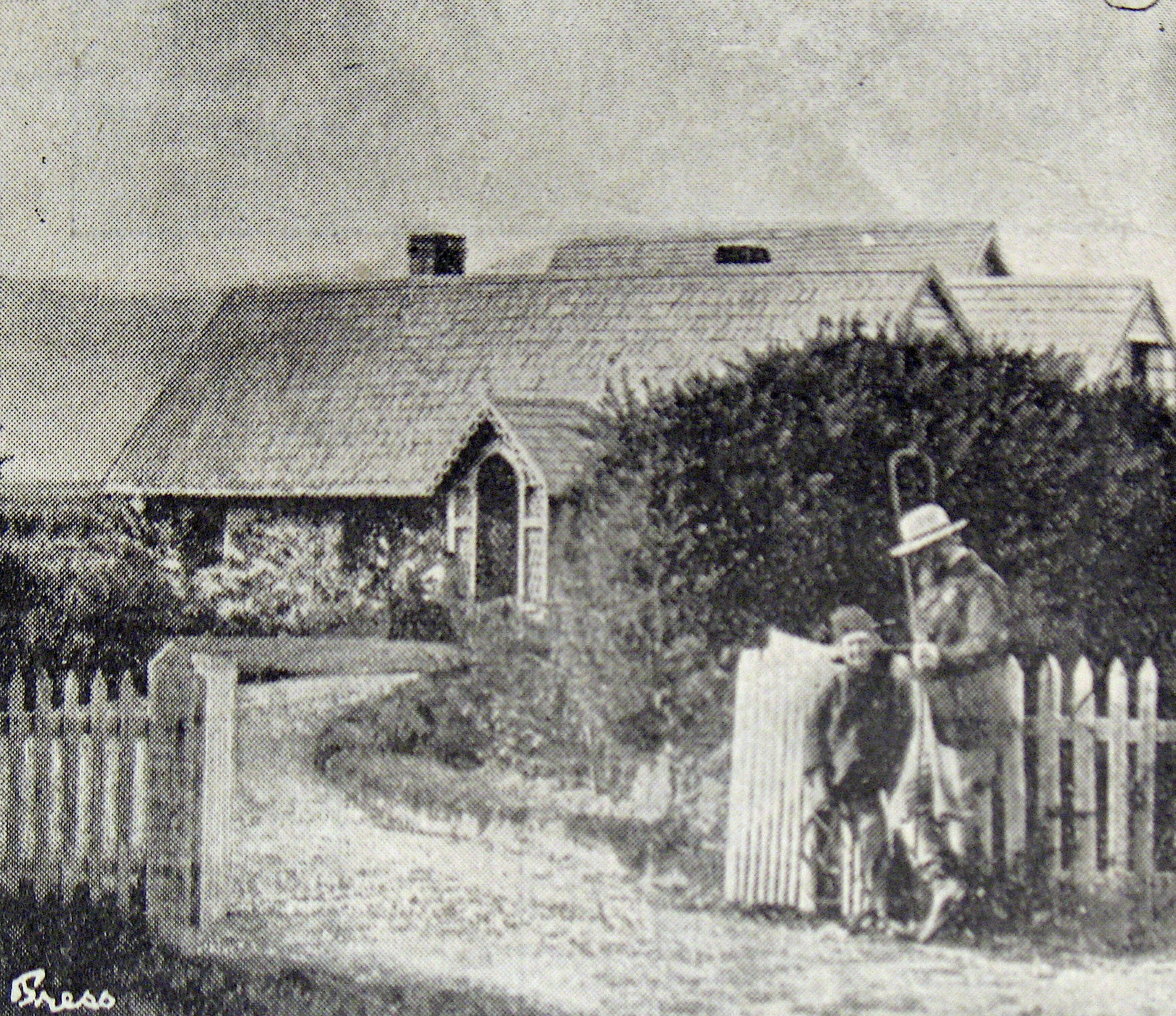
John Edward FitzGerald photographed with his oldest son at Springs Station, Canterbury, by Dr Alfred Charles Barker, between 1858 and 1867

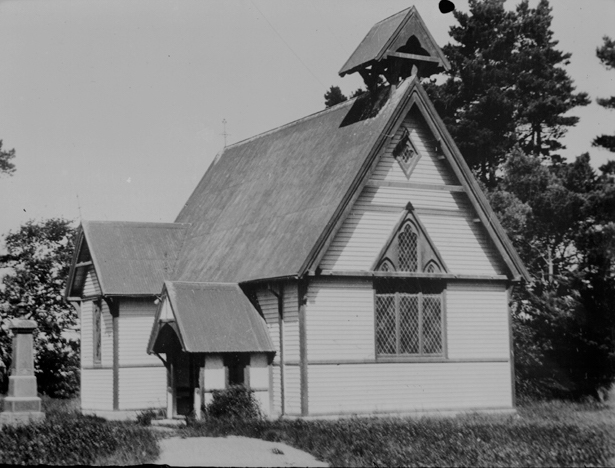
St Mary's Church, Springston

Springston statistical area had a population of 2,118 in the 2023 New Zealand census, a decrease of 24 people (−1.1%) since the 2018 census, and an increase of 96 people (4.7%) since the 2013 census. There were 1,074 males, 1,038 females, and 6 people of other genders in 756 dwellings. 2.8% of people identified as LGBTIQ+. The median age was 42.5 years (compared with 38.1 years nationally). There were 387 people (18.3%) aged under 15 years, 375 (17.7%) aged 15 to 29, 1,011 (47.7%) aged 30 to 64, and 348 (16.4%) aged 65 or older.

People could identify as more than one ethnicity. The results were 91.8% European (Pākehā); 8.9% Māori; 2.7% Pasifika; 4.7% Asian; 0.7% Middle Eastern, Latin American and African New Zealanders (MELAA); and 3.4% other, which includes people giving their ethnicity as "New Zealander". English was spoken by 98.2%, Māori by 1.3%, Samoan by 0.6%, and other languages by 7.2%. No language could be spoken by 1.4% (e.g. too young to talk). New Zealand Sign Language was known by 0.3%. The percentage of people born overseas was 16.3, compared with 28.8% nationally.

Religious affiliations were 27.6% Christian, 0.1% Hindu, 0.1% Islam, 0.1% Māori religious beliefs, 0.6% Buddhist, 0.4% New Age, and 1.3% other religions. People who answered that they had no religion were 61.6%, and 8.2% of people did not answer the census question.

Of those at least 15 years old, 390 (22.5%) people had a bachelor's or higher degree, 1,014 (58.6%) had a post-high school certificate or diploma, and 330 (19.1%) people exclusively held high school qualifications. The median income was $45,100, compared with $41,500 nationally. 240 people (13.9%) earned over $100,000 compared to 12.1% nationally. The employment status of those at least 15 was 969 (56.0%) full-time, 273 (15.8%) part-time, and 30 (1.7%) unemployed.

== Education ==
Springston School is a full primary school catering for years 1 to 8. It had a roll of 237 as of July 2026. The school was established in 1868.
