= William Saunders (Liberal politician) =

British newspaper publisher and Liberal Party politician (1823–1895)

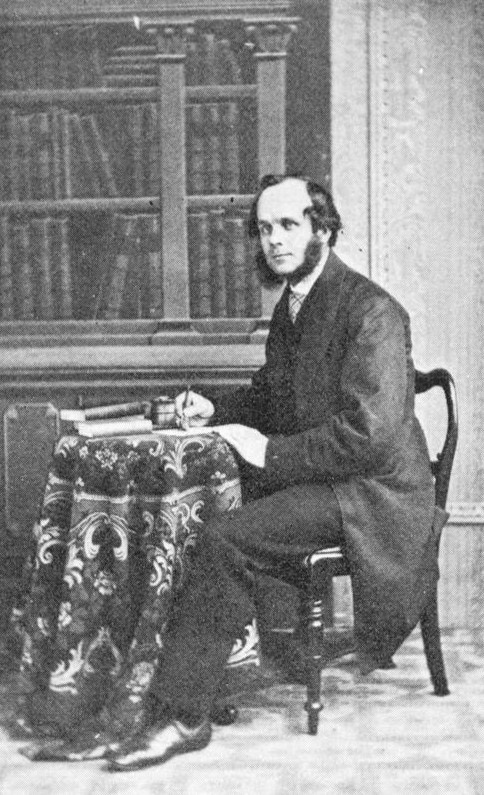
- William Saunders, date unknown

Member of Parliament for Kingston upon Hull East
- In office 1885–1886
- Preceded by: New constituency
- Succeeded by: Frederick Grotrian

Member of Parliament for Walworth
- In office 1892–1895
- Preceded by: Lewis Henry Isaacs
- Succeeded by: James Bailey

Personal details
- Born: 20 November 1823 Market Lavington, Wiltshire, England
- Died: 1 May 1895 (aged 71)
- Party: Liberal Party
- Spouse: Caroline Spender
- Parent: Amram Saunders (father)
- Relatives: Mary Bayly (sister); Samuel Saunders (brother); Alfred Saunders (brother); Sarah Page (niece)

William Saunders (20 November 1823 – 1 May 1895) was a British newspaper publisher and Liberal Party politician who sat in the House of Commons between 1885 and 1895.

== Biography ==
Saunders was born in 1823 in Market Lavington, the youngest son of Mary and Amram Saunders. He went to school in Devizes. His elder sister was the temperance campaigner Mary Bayly Samuel Saunders (1814–1908) and Alfred Saunders (1820–1905) were his elder brothers. Alfred's child Sarah Page was his niece.

Saunders, who was a member of The Plymouth Institution (now The Plymouth Athenaeum), founded several newspapers. He established the Western Morning News at Plymouth in 1860 with Edward Spender. The Eastern Morning News was established at Hull and the first number appeared in January 1864. Saunders also established the Central News Agency, and was vice-president of the United Kingdom Alliance, a temperance society.

In the 1885 general election, Saunders was elected Member of Parliament for Kingston upon Hull East but lost the seat in the 1886 general election.

In January 1889, he was elected to the newly created London County Council as a councillor representing the Walworth division of Newington. Nominated by the local Liberal and Radical Association, he took his seat as a member of the majority Progressive Party, allied to the parliamentary Liberals. He was re-elected in 1892 and held his seat until 1895.

He returned to the House of Commons at the 1892 general election when he won Walworth from the sitting Conservative MP. He died in office in May 1895, triggering a by-election on 14 May in which the seat was regained by the Conservatives.

Saunders married Caroline Spender and was great uncle of the poet Stephen Spender.

Parliament of the United Kingdom
New constituency see Kingston upon Hull	Member of Parliament for Kingston upon Hull East; 1885 – 1886	Succeeded by Frederick Grotrian
Preceded by Lewis Henry Isaacs	Member of Parliament for Walworth; 1892 – 1895	Succeeded by James Bailey
