= Christ's College, Christchurch =

Christ's College Canterbury

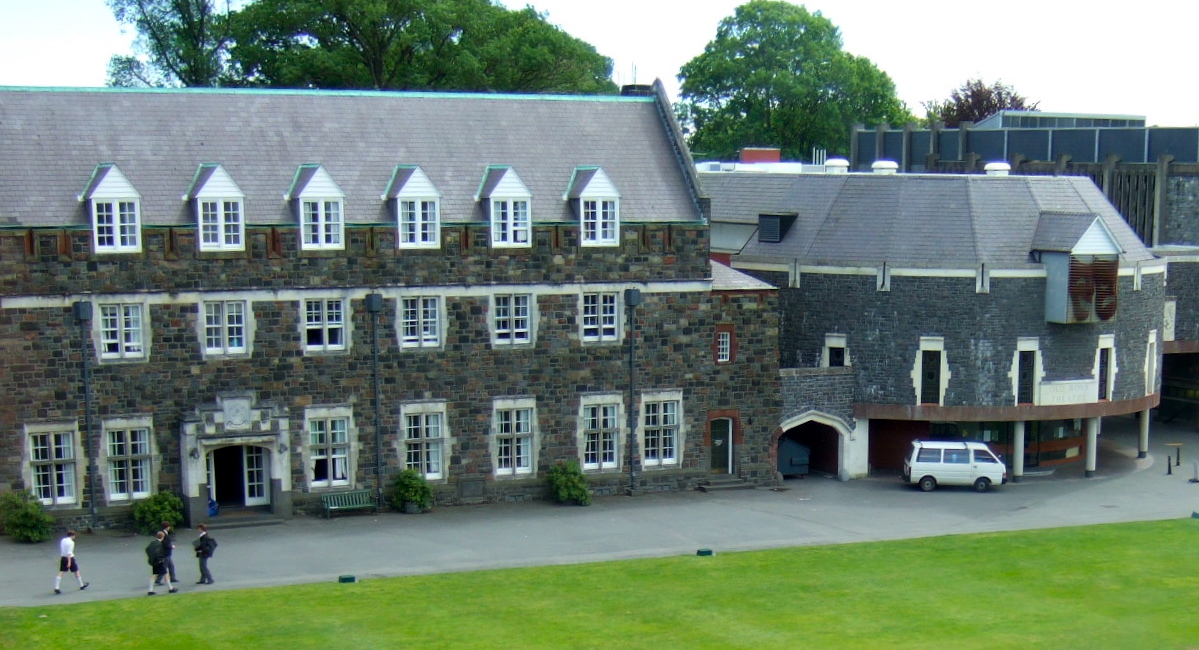
- Jacobs House (left) and Old Boys' Theatre

Location
- 33 Rolleston Avenue, Christchurch, New Zealand; 43°31′47″S 172°37′33″E

Information
- Type: Private, Single-sex, Secondary (Years 9–13), Day & Boarding
- Motto: Latin: Bene tradita, bene servanda (Good traditions, Well maintained)
- Religious affiliation: Anglicanism
- Established: 1850; 176 years ago
- Ministry of Education Institution no.: 330
- Chair: Jeremy Johnson, KSM
- Headmaster: Joe Eccleton
- Chaplain: Rev'd Cameron Pickering
- Enrolment: 706 (July 2026)
- Alumni: Christ's College Old Boys
- Website: www.christscollege.com

Christ's College, Canterbury is a private Anglican secondary day and boarding school for boys, located in the city centre of Christchurch, New Zealand.

Founded in 1850 by Reverend Henry Jacobs in Lyttelton as a school for early settlers, the college is the oldest independent school in the country. The college currently caters for approximately 698 students from Year 9 to Year 13.

Christ's College is an International Member of The Headmasters' and Headmistresses' Conference (HMC). The Headmasters' and Headmistresses' Conference (HMC) represents the Heads of the leading independent schools in Ireland and the United Kingdom and International schools mainly from the Commonwealth. Christ's College is one of only three member schools in New Zealand. Christ's College is also member of Round Square, an international network of 230 schools in 50 countries around the world. Christ's College is one of the three Round Square member schools in New Zealand.

== History ==
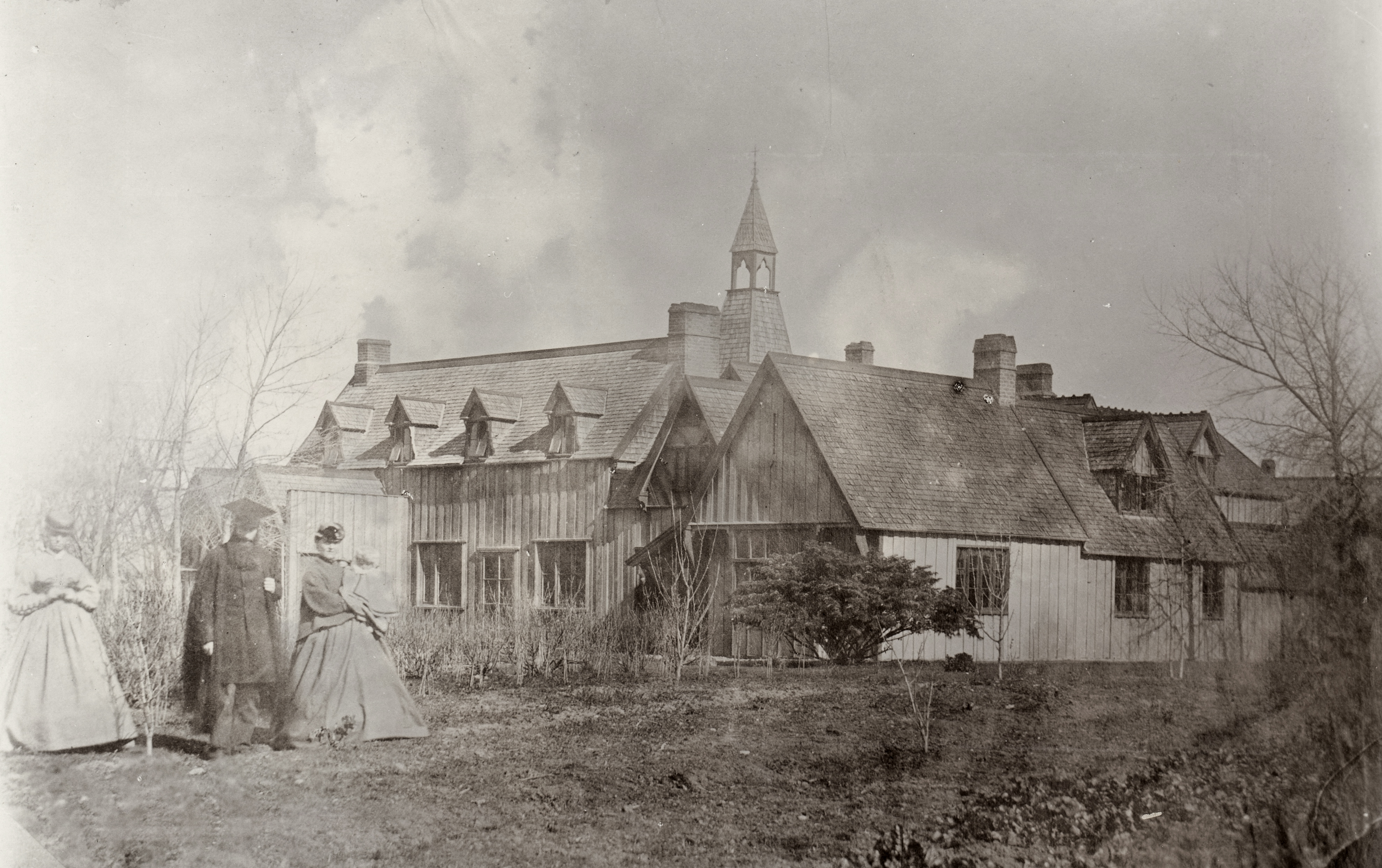
Christ's College Grammar School with Archdeacon William Chambers Harris, Ann Mathilda Louisa (Sanders) Harris, and baby George Harris, Christchurch, New Zealand, 1867

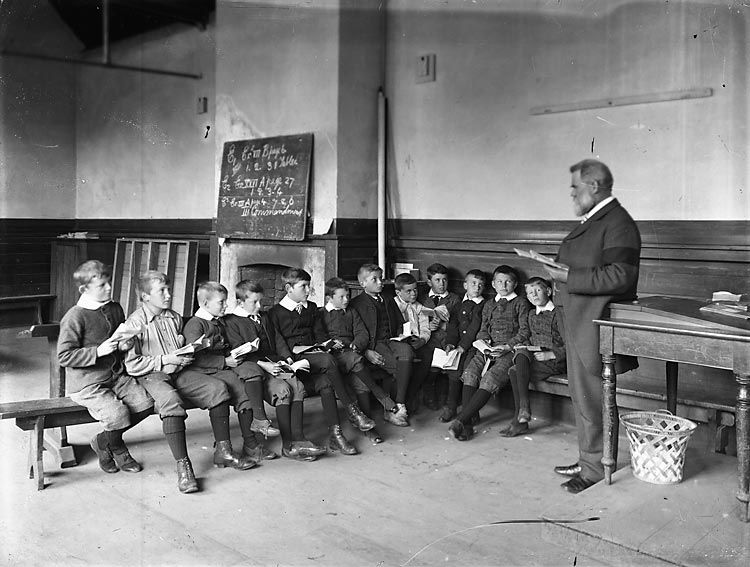
Pupils of the Lower School with Schoolmaster Mr Wiggins, c. 1903

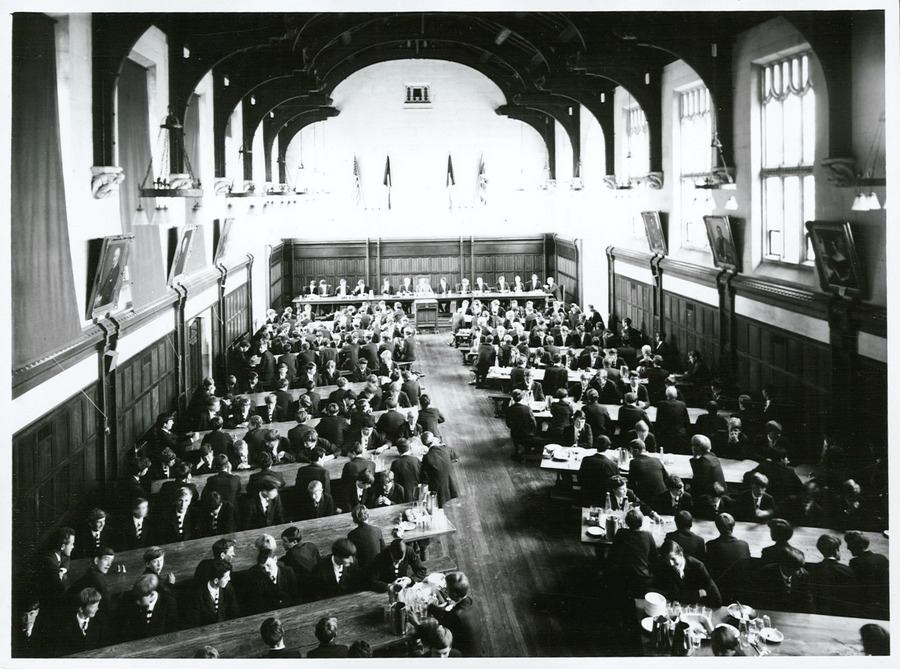
Christ's College dining hall (1968)

Christ's College (formerly Christ's College Grammar School) was established in 1850 and directly modelled on the pedagogic vernacular of English public schools, such as Eton College and Radley College. The school was most likely named Christ's College by James FitzGerald, Canterbury's first Superintendent, after his old College at Cambridge (Christ's College, Cambridge). At its foundation, the school was run from two rooms at the immigration barracks at Lyttelton, and the emphasis was on a classical education, including Greek and Latin, Modern languages, Mathematics, English, History and Geography. Students were also expected to conduct scientific experiments, to draw and sing. It used to be closely associated with the Lyttelton Collegiate Grammar School which was also located in the Lyttelton Immigration Barracks.

The school left Lyttelton in 1852 and moved over the hill to the St Michael's parsonage in Oxford Terrace with 16 students. Henry Jacobs, the first headmaster, ensured that his school enabled both boarders and day boys to attend.

Christ's College moved to its present site in 1856, with 35 pupils and a staff of three. This location, adjacent to the Government Domain (now Hagley Park), provided the college with room to expand, and the school gradually began to acquire additional buildings. The first of these building were wooden, providing homes for the staff and their families and an increasing number of boarders. By 1863, Big School, the first of the stone buildings, had been built on the west side of the quadrangle in which all classes were taught (in present-day it is the school's library with additions by Sir Miles Warren and currently the oldest educational building still in use in New Zealand), followed in 1867 by the Chapel. The school developed slowly around this central quadrangle, and today the 'quad' is treated with reverence, and therefore students are not permitted to walk on it, only staff members and permitted visitors. The Cathedral Grammar School used to be the Lower School of Christ's College when it struggled financially from 1895 to 1922.

In its early days, the college taught boys as young as six, with each boy arriving with a different level of education. Subsequently, there was a wide age range in many classes and, until the number of classrooms increased, they were all taught together.

The school motto, Bene Tradita, Bene Servanda in Latin translates to "good traditions, well maintained".

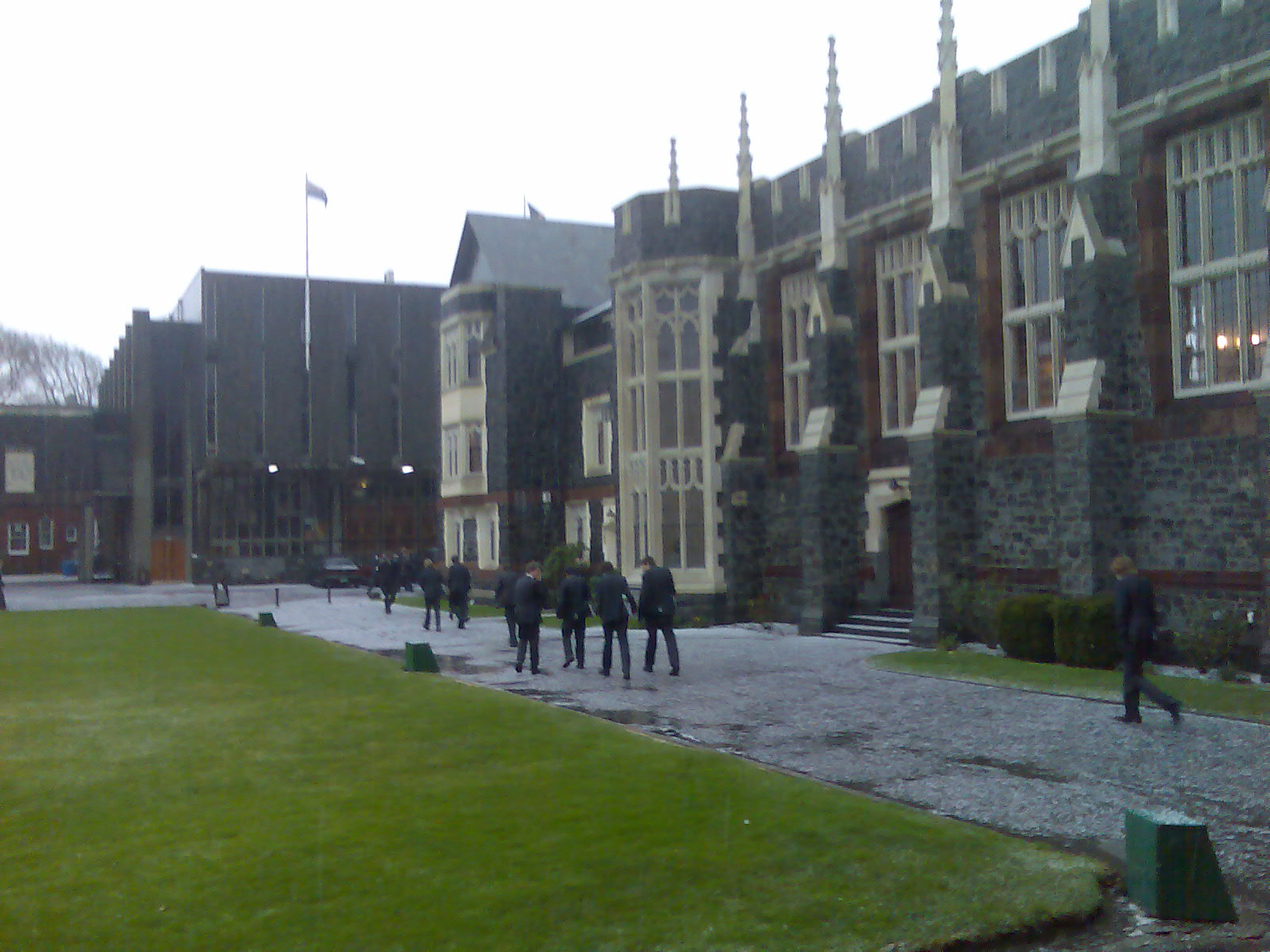
The Christ's College Quad and Dining Hall

=== Campus ===
In the original survey of central Christchurch (known as the Black Map), which was undertaken in 1850, it was envisaged for Christ's College and ChristChurch Cathedral to be built adjacent to one another in Cathedral Square, modelled on Christ Church, Oxford. The area set aside for the college in Cathedral Square, 3 acres 1 rood and 3 perches (13,230 m^{2}), was found to be insufficient. In a meeting in June 1853 between Henry Sewell, Henry Jacobs, Rev. Robert Bateman Paul, and Thomas Cass, Sewell took the group for a visit of a site earmarked as the Government Domain (i.e. botanical gardens). The group agreed on the site, subject to approval by Bishop Selwyn, which was later obtained. Years later, this land transaction was formalised through The Cathedral Square Ordinance 1858, a law passed by the Canterbury Provincial Council in October 1858. The compensation paid for the transfer of land to the Provincial Council was £1,200, but with 10 acres (40,000 m^{2}), the college was also given a much larger piece of land.

The Christ's College grounds have a collection of nineteenth century, and turn-of-the-century buildings, as well as newly built buildings such as the Old Boys Theatre and the Fine Arts Building. The neogothic style is dominant, as was the case for most notable colonial-period buildings in Christchurch, such as the cathedral, and the original buildings of Canterbury University (formerly Canterbury College), which is now the Christchurch Arts Centre. 'Big School', built in 1863, is the original classroom for the Christchurch site of the school, and is one of the oldest surviving buildings of its type in New Zealand.

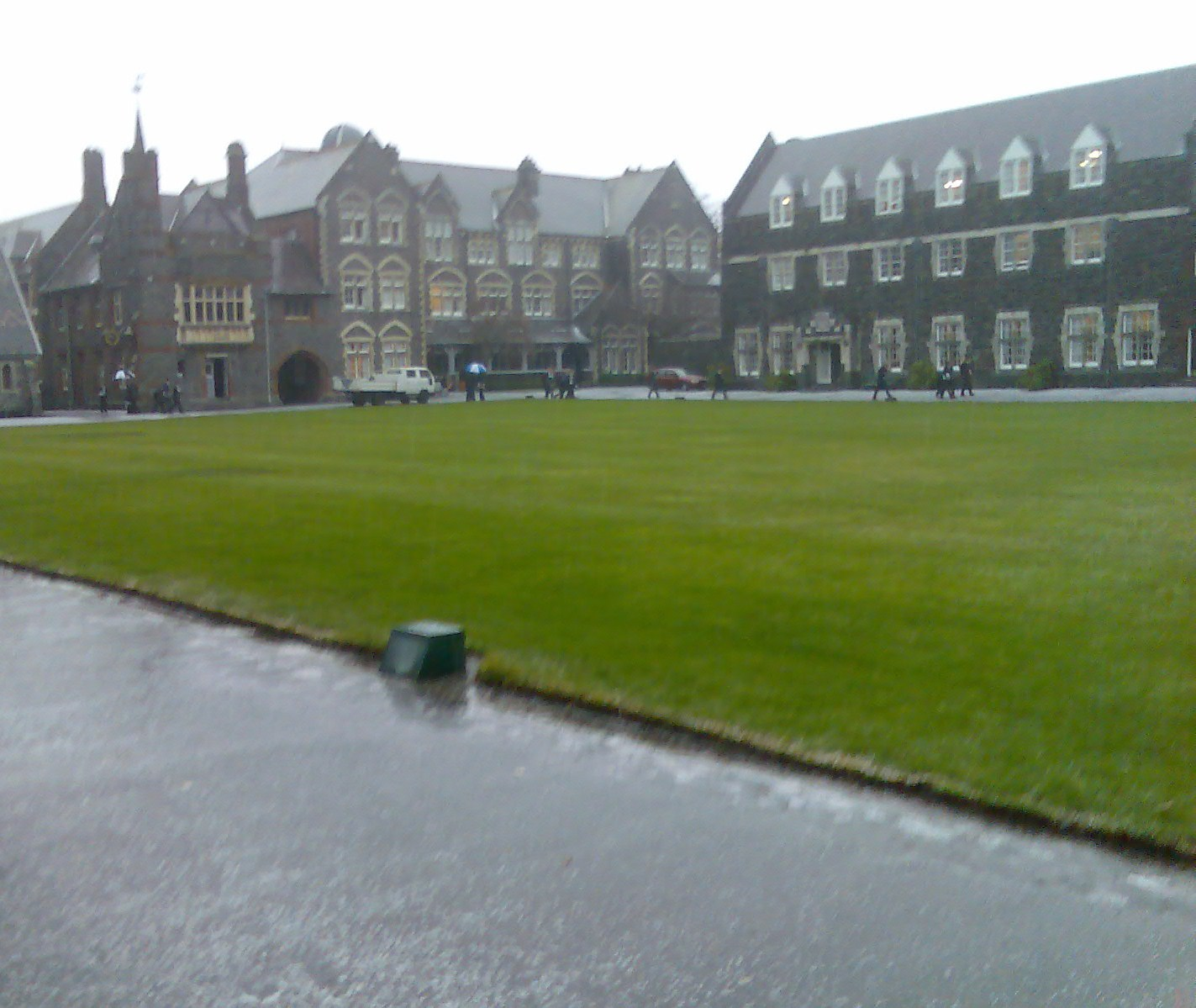
Quad and buildings

=== Upper department (College House, University of Canterbury) ===
College House was created as part of Christ's College in 1850. According to College House:

[Christ's College] was instrumental in the establishment of Canterbury University in the early 1870s.

The upper department became a residential college of the university after it was founded, and soon it was referred to as College House. The upper and lower departments (tertiary and secondary departments) separated in 1957, and College House became independent.

== Enrolment ==
As a private school, Christ's College charges tuition fees to cover costs. For the 2025 school year, tuition fees for New Zealand residents are $34,190 per year. Boarding fees are an additional $22,250 per year.

As of July 2026, Christ's College has roll of 706 students, of which 46 (6.5%) identify as Māori. As a private school, the school is not assigned an Equity Index.

== College life ==
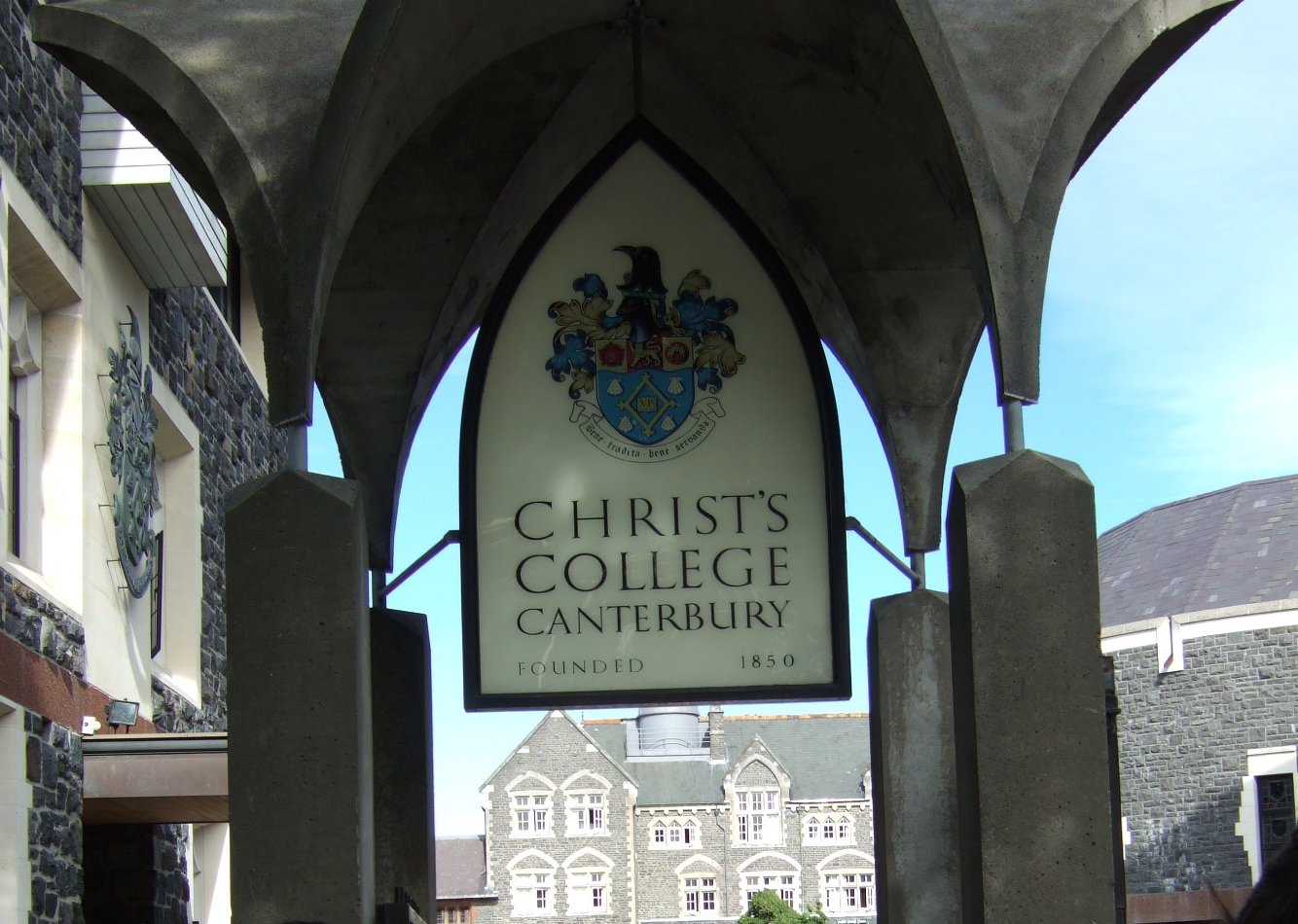
Christ's College Entrance, Administration block to the left, Old Boys' Theatre to the right and School House in the centre background

=== Chapel ===
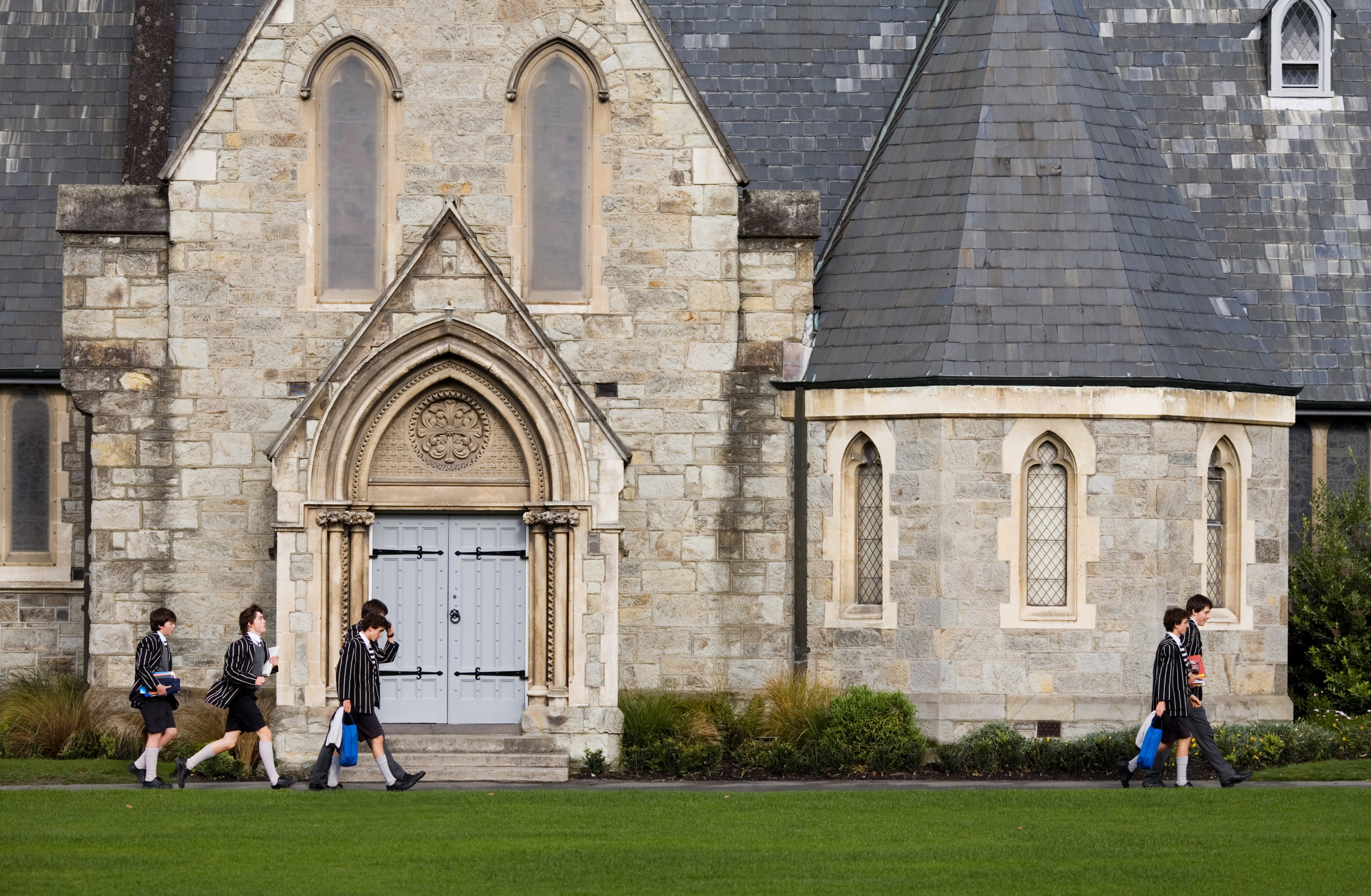
The chapel.

The chapel is an integral part of the school with compulsory religious education being undertaken until Year 11. Every Wednesday congregational practice takes place, in which the whole school sings, and practises hymns, psalms, prayers and chapel routine. Boys are also required to attend chapel on Monday and Friday mornings and usually alternative Sundays, even if it coincides with their own church service outside the school. The school chapel service takes priority and compulsory two services each term are required. Parents and family are welcome to attend Sunday chapel. Music is an integral part of school life, the Christ's College Chapel Choir consists of approximately eighty boys though changes yearly with the incoming year 9 group and leaving year 13's. The choir sings at chapel services, public and private events and takes part in several singing competitions such as the Big Sing, and in 2007 the international Summa Cum Laude Festival in Vienna (attaining second place).

=== Curriculum ===
The school offers students NCEA Levels 2 and 3 and scholarship examinations through NZQA. From 2022, they have discontinued NCEA Level 1 and replaced it with 'the College Diploma', a two-year course from Year 10–11. There are many academic disciplines offered at the school as subjects, varying from the standard English and Mathematics to French, drama, classical studies, physical education, art history, sciences and many other subjects. Mathematics is compulsory up to and including year 11. Year 9, 10, and 11 classes consist of a wide array of subjects to introduce students to different subject to see what they enjoy before having to select subjects in year 12 which go towards NCEA level 2.

=== Extra-curricular ===
Christ's College also places a strong emphasis on extra-curricular activities. Throughout the year there are opportunities in many areas; speech and drama, kapa haka, music, debating, model United Nations and several other activities. Performing arts are a large aspect of college life, with all boys expected to participate in at least one part; there is a Junior and Senior production each year (in collaboration with Rangi Ruru Girls' School or St Margaret's College), an annual House Singing competition and the REACTION House Play festival, where each house forms a group of students to perform a play for the Tothill Cup Interhouse Drama Trophy. Students are encouraged to partake in areas they have not attempted before, especially within these inter-house arts competitions.

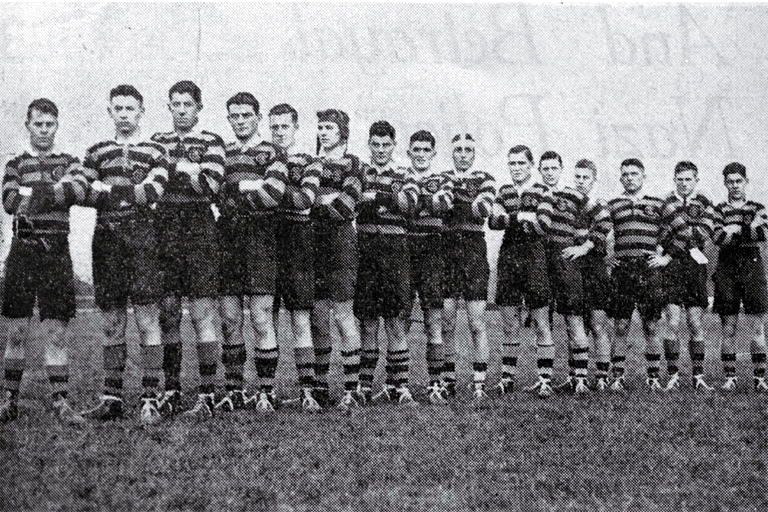
Christ's College rugby team, 1940

=== Sport ===
Sport is compulsory for all boys; there is an extensive selection of sports available with boys choosing both a summer and winter option each year. As well as school sports, there are ongoing inter-house sports competitions, where all students are expected to participate in, or to come and support their houses. Extra sporting activities are also available: for example, the school ski club buses to the ski fields on weekends during winter terms. Sports facilities on site include Upper, the school playing field, an all weather facility, a 5-lane indoor 25-metre heated swimming pool, gymnasium and weights room. Offsite facilities include the nearby Christ's College cricket ground (which also has football and rugby fields) which consists of four hectares of South Hagley Park, and Kerr's Reach on the Avon River which is home to the Christ's College rowing club, consisting of a boat house which houses top quality rowing equipment. It is claimed that a form of rugby was being played at the school as early as 1853. Each year its rugby team plays with Wanganui Collegiate School, Wellington College and Nelson College in a tournament known as the "Quadrangular". It also has a long-running rivalry with Christchurch Boys' High School, and an annual rugby match between the two schools is fiercely contested.

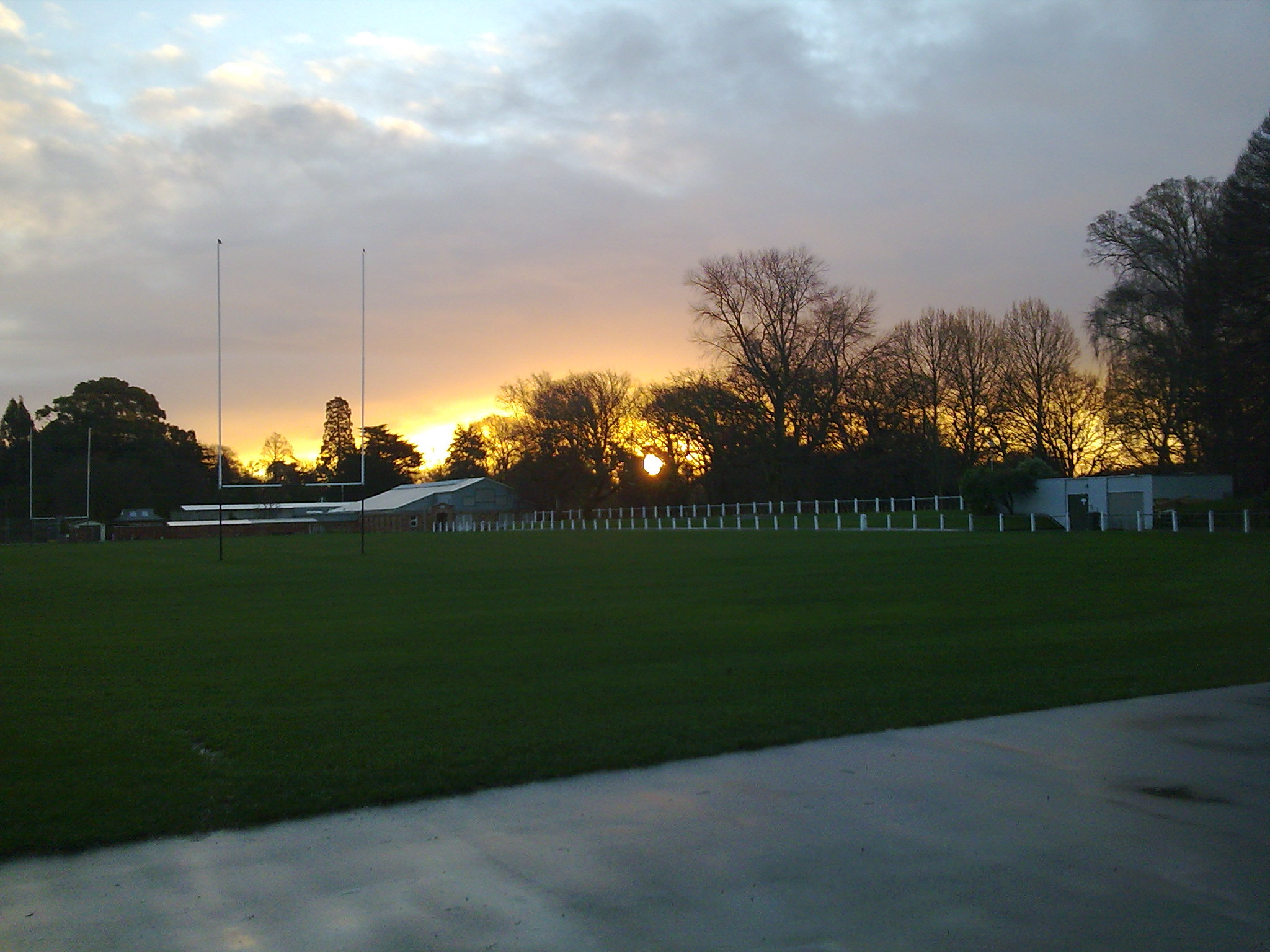
The Christ's College sports field (called Upper) at sunset

The school and students are sometimes referred to by the derogatory name "syrup suckers" or "syrups". The term originates in a rugby rivalry with Christchurch Boys' High School. In 2025, cricket commentator Scotty Stevenson used the term on air, prompting a complaint from the school. The term was described as a "sexualised slur" by headmaster Joe Eccleton. Stevenson apologised for the remark.

== House system ==
In keeping with the tradition of English public schools, Christ's College has ten Houses accommodating around 700 students. There are three boarding houses and the dayboys are organised into seven more houses. Each house has a housemaster responsible for the care of the boys.

From the school's early days, Houses were a base for boarders within the school, and these changed their names as Masters came and went. The name Jacobs has been retained, while others have been replaced by School, Richards and Flower's. It was not until 1909 that the first two day-boy Houses were established. They were named 'North Town' and 'South Town', and students were allocated to them depending on whether their homes were north or south of Gloucester Street. In 1924, these Houses were renamed Harper and Julius – Condell's, Corfe, Rolleston and Somes have also been added over the years.

The year groups within the Houses are encouraged to build House spirit and to compete in sporting and cultural competitions. Cricket and football games were established as soon as there were enough boarders to compete against each other, and gradually music and drama competitions have been added.

=== Day Houses ===
- Condell's
- Corfe
- Harper
- Julius
- Rolleston
- Somes
- Jacobs (Transitioned to a day house at the end of 2016)

Houses for dayboys provide a place for study and recreation, a Common Room, showers and changing facilities, and areas for storing books and sports clothing. Boys meet here at the beginning of each day for House Assembly where they receive notices for the day and reminders of forthcoming events to prepare for from their Housemaster.

=== Boarding Houses ===
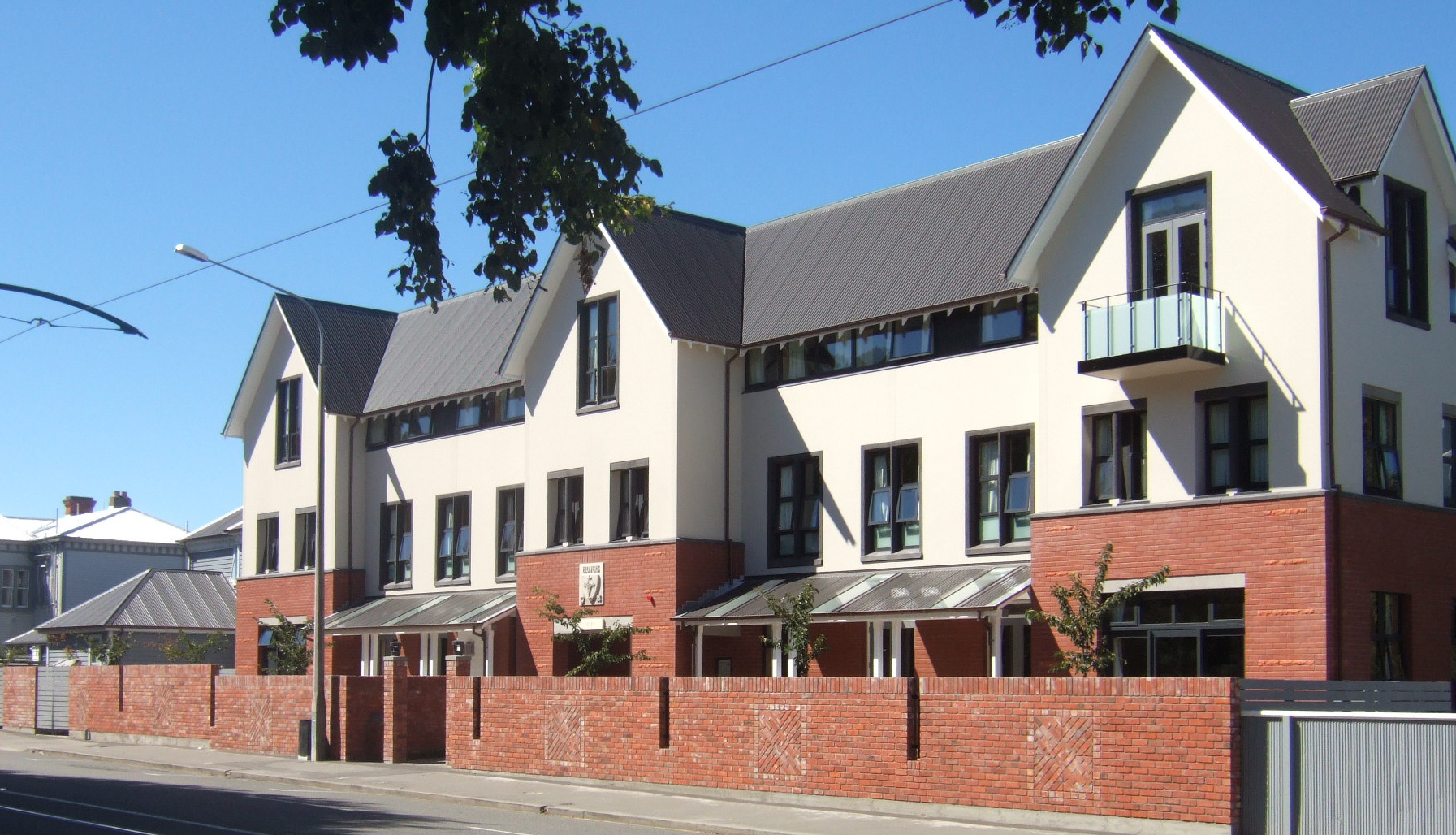
Flower's House

- Flower's
- Richards
- School

In the boarding environment, the facilities and support systems are more comprehensive. Assisting the Housemaster are an assistant housemaster, a matron, and two live-in tutors who are also studying at university. Most of the school facilities, such as the library, computer room, gymnasium, pool, music and art rooms, and the workshop, are open for use by boarding boys out of school hours. Evening activities during the week include set times for homework, but recreational activities are also encouraged.

The Christ's College Boarding Programme keeps boarders busy in the weekends. With age-appropriate activities tailored to each year group's needs, boarders are given a number of opportunities that may not be available to dayboys.

== Uniform ==
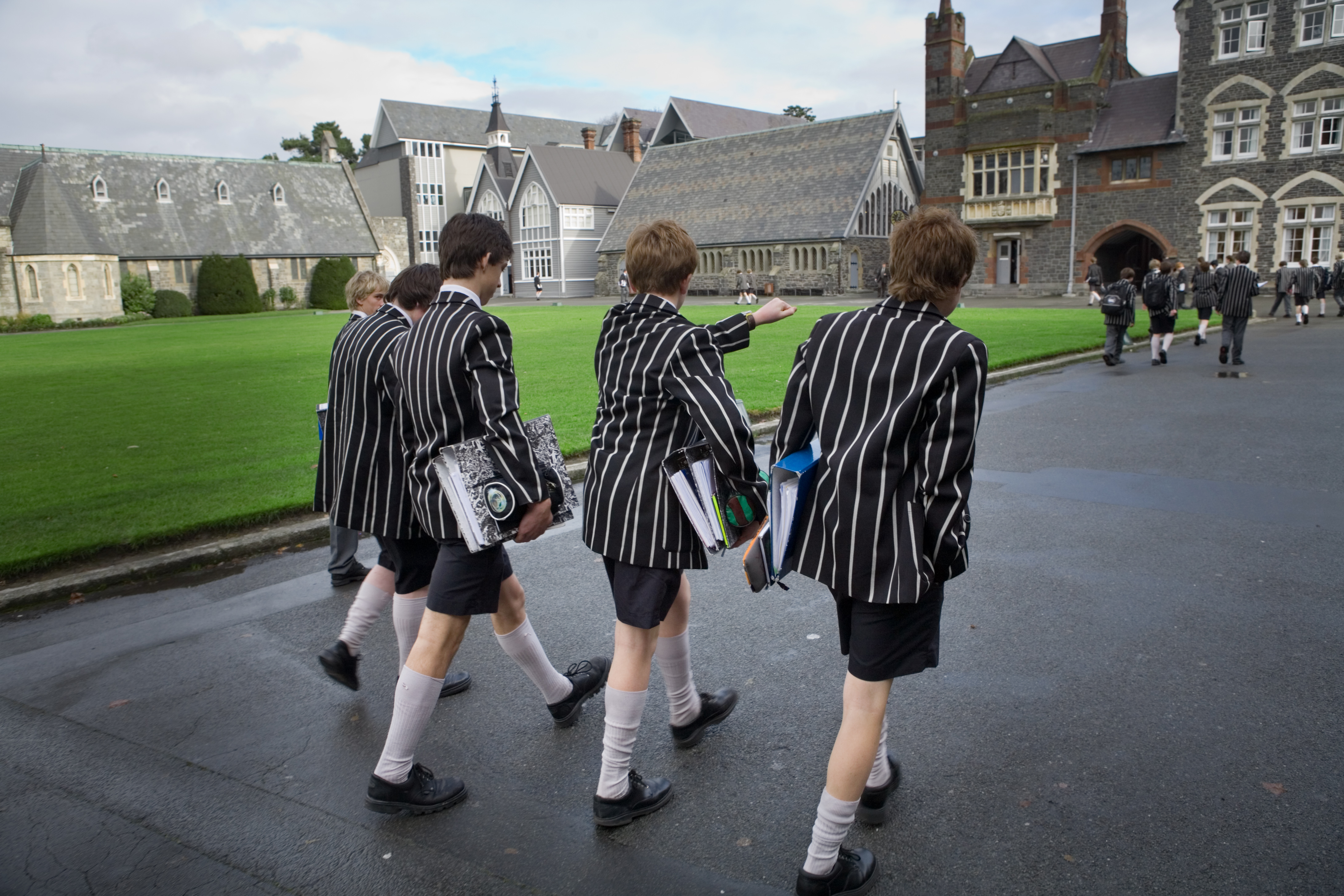
Boys wearing the college's uniform.

The black and white striped blazers and ties Christ's College boys wear are recognisable and well known, especially within Christchurch. There are two types of uniform: Sport's Uniform and Dress Uniform (known by the boys as stripes or suits respectively). During Winter terms dress uniform is worn on Mondays and Fridays, and sports uniform is worn on Tuesday, Wednesdays and Thursdays. Dress uniform is required for chapel services and other formal occasions. A high standard of dress is expected at all times and boys are punished for incorrect or incorrectly worn uniform, boys must always wear their blazers when in town, even with summer uniform.

Each house has a different uniform for inter house sporting events and is made up of a rugby jersey or singlet in the house colour and black shorts. Each different sport also has its own uniform for games, a black tracksuit with College crest is required for travelling to and from games venues and for field trips where the uniform of the day is not suitable.

== Governance ==
The Christ's College governing body comprises a chairman, Warden and Fellows. The Bishop of Christchurch is ex officio Warden.

=== Current ===
- Chair: Jeremy Johnson, KSM
- Warden: Bishop of Canterbury, Rt Rev Peter Carrell
- Headmaster: Joe Eccleton

== Notable alumni ==
Alumni of Christ's College are known as Old Boys, and may elect to join the school's alumni association, the Christ's College Old Boys' Association (CCOBA). Some notable Christ's College Old Boys include:

=== Academia ===
- John McMillan (1951–2007), economist, former professor of Stanford University
- Murray C. Wells (born 1936), emeritus professor at the University of Sydney
- Robin Williams (1919–2013), mathematician, vice-chancellor
- Paul Wilson (born 1941), criminologist, Chair of Criminology at Bond University; crime author; sexual offender

=== Business ===
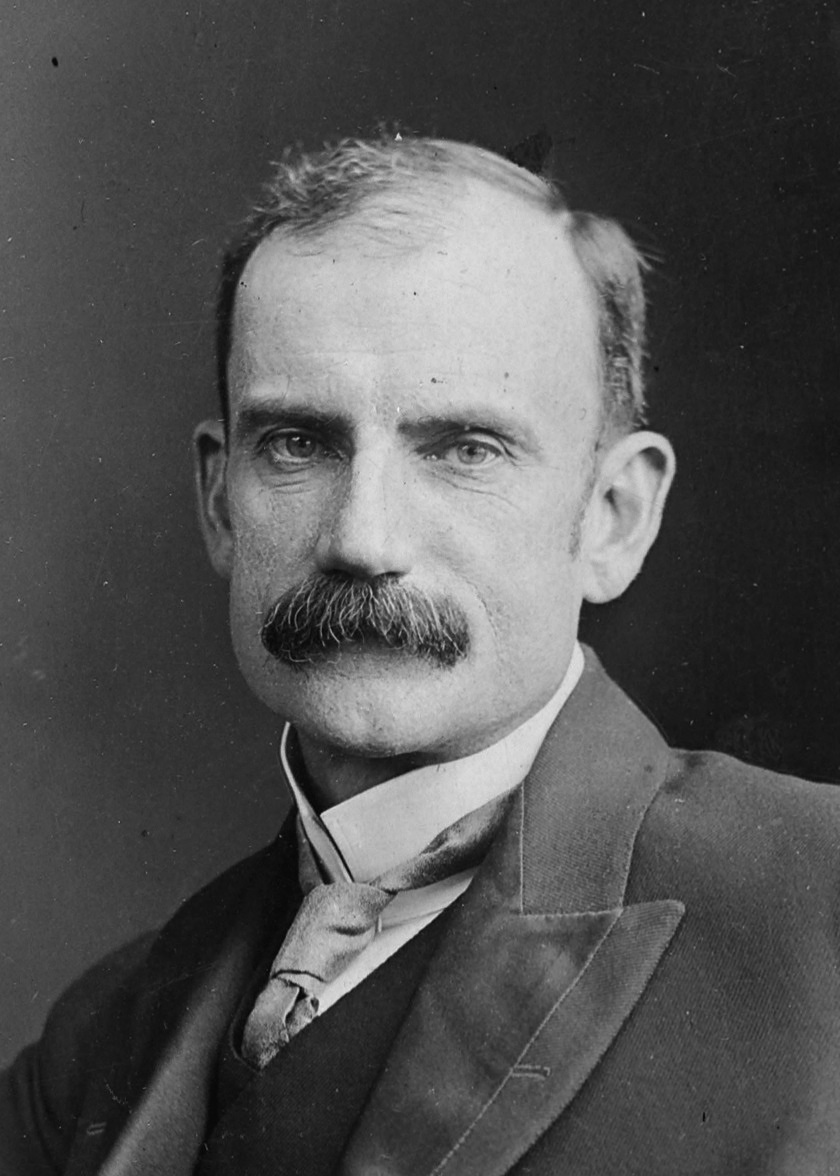
William Pember Reeves

- John Anderson (1945–2018), chief executive and Director of ANZ National Bank Limited
- Don Elder, CEO of Solid Energy
- Peter Elworthy (1935–2004), prominent rural businessman
- Bill Hamilton (1899–1978), inventor of the jet boat
- Tim Wallis (born 1938), deer industry pioneer, developer of Warbirds over Wanaka
- Michael Watt ONZM (born 1940), entrepreneur, philanthropist, investor
- Sir Miles Warren (1929–2022), architect
- Richard Woods (born 1941), former director of the S.I.S.

=== Entertainment, media and the arts ===
- Alister Austen Deans (1915–2011), painter
- Denis Glover (1912–1980), poet
- Mark Hadlow (born 1957), actor
- Leigh Hart (born 1970), comedian, actor "That Guy"
- James Milne, musician, The Reduction Agents, known as Lawrence Arabia
- Guy Montgomery (born 1988), comedian
- Sam Neill (1947–2026), actor
- William Pember Reeves (1857–1932), author, historian
- James Reid (born 1974), musician, The Feelers
- Teddy Tahu Rhodes (born 1966), singer
- Lin Saunders (1908–1995), music critic, broadcaster

=== Military ===
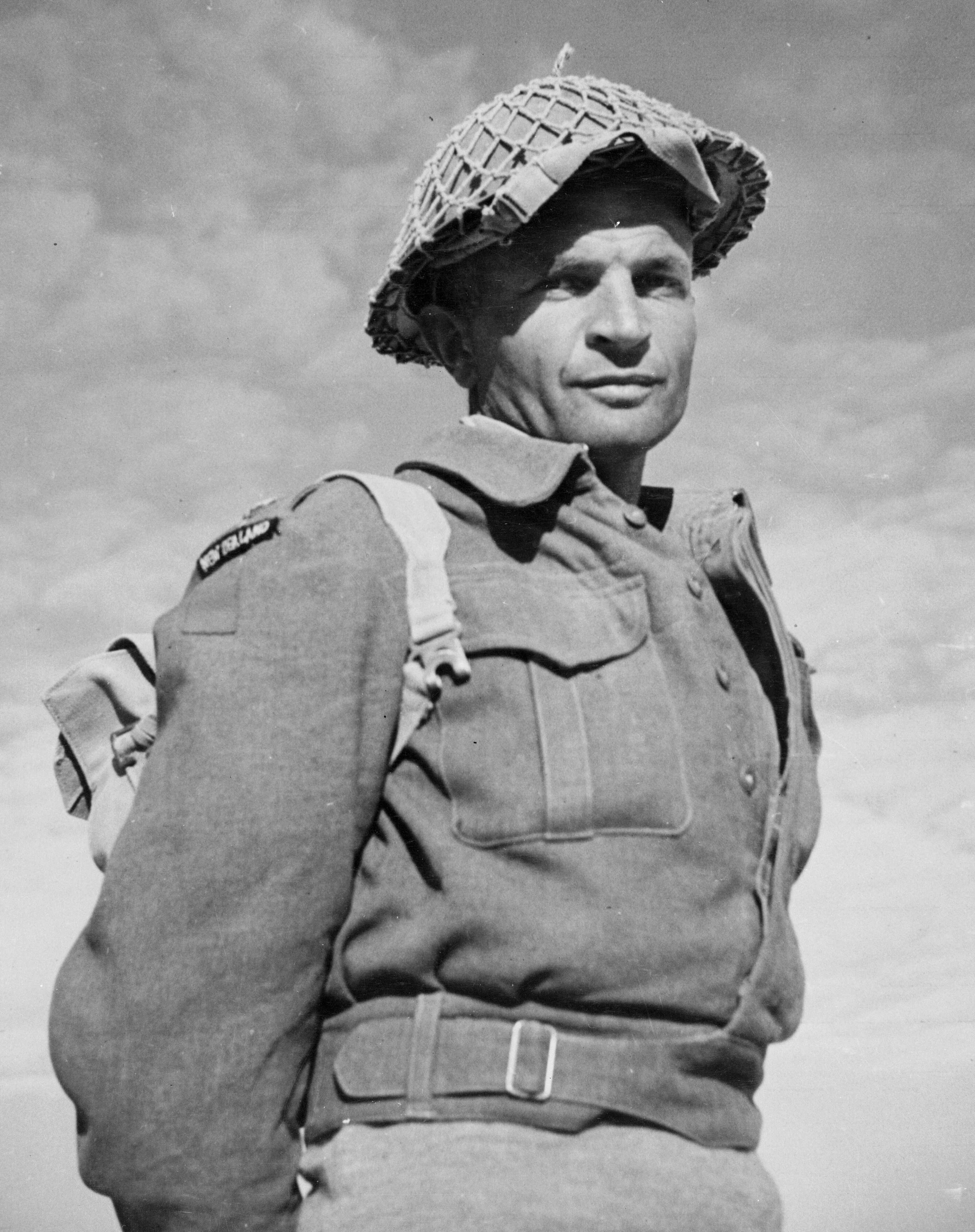
Captain Charles Upham, VC and Bar

- George Buckley (1866–1937), soldier and explorer
- Colin Falkland Gray, New Zealand's top RAF flying ace of WW2
- Edgar Kain (1918–1940), the first RAF flying ace of WW2
- Guy Newton, a RNZAF flying ace of WW2
- Charles Upham (1908–1994), war hero, double Victoria Cross winner

=== Public service ===
- Jack Acland (1904–1981), MP for Temuka
- Hugh Campbell (1875–1951), MP for Hawkes Bay
- Michael Cullen (1945–2021), former Deputy Prime Minister and Minister for Finance
- Jonathan Elworthy (1936–2005), former Minister of Lands and Forests (1981–1984), member of Parliament for Waitaki, and farmer
- Michael Fowler (1929–2022), architect and former Mayor of Wellington
- Jim Gerard (born 1936), MP for Rangiora and Mayor of Waimakariri
- Geoff Gerard (1904–1997), MP for Mid-Canterbury and Ashburton
- Arthur Guinness (1846–1913), politician, former Speaker of Parliament
- Sam Johnson (born 1989), organiser of the Student Volunteer Army
- Ed Latter (1928–2016), National MP for Marlborough
- Duncan MacIntyre (1915–2001), National MP for various electorates in the Hawkes' Bay
- William Fisher Pearson (1854–1888), MP for Ashley
- Derek Quigley (born 1932), National MP for Rangiora and co-founder of ACT
- Frank Rolleston (1873–1946), MP for Timaru
- Thomas (Tom) Shand (1911–1969), National MP for Marlborough 1946–1969, Cabinet Minister; Postmaster-General (1954–1957), Minister of Labour (1960–1969), Minister of Immigration (1960–1969), and Minister of Mines (1960–1969), and Minister of Electricity (1963–1969), farmer
- Peter Skelton (born 1939), Justice of the Environment Court and commissioner at Environment Canterbury
- Andrew Tipping (born 1942), Justice of the Supreme Court of New Zealand
- Matthew Wale (born 1968), Prime Minister of Solomon Islands
- Claude Weston DSO KC (1879–1946), House of Representatives (West Coast), First President of the National Party (1936–1940)
- John Whitehead, Secretary to the Treasury (2003–2011)
- Kenneth Williams (1870–1935), MP for Bay of Plenty
- William Young (born 1952), President of the New Zealand Court of Appeal

=== Religion ===
- Charles Drennan (born 1960), 2nd Roman Catholic Bishop of Palmerston North (2012–2019)
- Vincent Gerard (1898–1984), 7th Anglican Bishop of Waiapu (1938–1944)
- Bernard O'Brien SJ (1907–1982), New Zealand Jesuit priest, philosopher, musician, writer and former seminary professor
- Herbert Williams (1860–1937), 6th Anglican Bishop of Waiapu and a distinguished Māori scholar (1930–1937)
- Peter Carrell (born 1959), 9th Anglican bishop of Christchurch (2019–present)

=== Science and medicine ===
- Sir Hugh Acland (1874–1956), surgeon, WWI medic, and local politician
- Sir Don Beaven (1924–2009), medical researcher and ground-breaking pioneer in diabetes treatment
- Robin Clark (1935–2018), chemist and Head of the University College London Department of Chemistry
- Charles Farthing (1953–2014), doctor, pioneer, medical expert and an advocate in care for HIV/AIDS
- Edward Sayers (1902–1985), doctor, parasitologist and Dean of the University of Otago medical school
- John Yaldwyn (1929–2005), carcinologist and Director of the Te Papa (1980–1989)
- Tom Milliken (1925–2015), plastic and reconstructive surgeon and head of the plastic surgical unit at Burwood Hospital

=== Sport ===
- Bryan Andrews (born 1945), cricketer and commentator
- Sam Bosworth (born 1994), Olympic Gold Medalist (Rowing, Tokyo 2020)
- Ian Botting (1922–1980), former All Black
- Sam Chaffey (1934–1988), alpine skier and Winter Olympian (Squaw Valley, 1960)
- Anthony Cottrell (1907–1988), former All Black prop
- Bruce Deans (1960–2019), former All Black
- Robbie Deans (born 1959), former All Black and former Crusaders, All Blacks and Australian rugby coach
- Peter Fulton (born 1979), New Zealand cricketer
- Roddy Fulton (born 1951), New Zealand cricket director, Canterbury and Northern Districts captain
- Zach Gallagher (born 2001), current Canterbury and Crusaders rugby player
- Tony MacGibbon (1924-2010), cricketer, Canterbury and New Zealand
- Dallas McLeod (born 1999), current Crusaders rugby player
- Jack Hazlett (1938–2014), former All Black
- Jock Hobbs (1960–2012), former All Black and former chairman of NZRU
- James Lassche (born 1989), Olympic rower
- Tom Lowry (1898–1976), New Zealand's first Test cricket captain
- Simon Maling (born 1975), former All Black
- David Monaghan (1922–1944), cricketer
- Joe Moody (born 1988), current All Black prop
- Damian McKenzie (born 1995), All Blacks, Tokyo Sungoliath
- Marty McKenzie (born 1992), Chiefs, Māori All Blacks
- Arthur Ollivier (1851–1897), representative cricketer and mountaineer; chairperson of the Old Boys' Association (1895–1897)
- Ngane Punivai (born 1998), current Canterbury and Highlanders player
- Isaiah Punivai (born 2000), current Canterbury and Crusaders player
- Alastair Robinson (born 1956), former All Black
- James Ryan (born 1983), former All Black
- John Wright (born 1954), former New Zealand cricket captain and New Zealand and Indian cricket coach

== See also ==
- List of oldest buildings in Christchurch
- Lists of schools in New Zealand
- List of boarding schools
