= 1862 Ellesmere by-election =

New Zealand by-election

The 1862 Ellesmere by-election was a by-election held on 9 June 1862 during the 3rd New Zealand Parliament in the Canterbury electorate of Ellesmere.

The by-election was caused by the resignation of the incumbent MP Thomas Rowley.

The by-election was won by James FitzGerald. He was unopposed.

At two other by-elections held in June 1862 for Avon and Heathcote the candidates were also returned unopposed; see 1862 by-election and 1862 by-election.
