= William Burns (cricketer) =

English cricketer (1883–1916)

Cricket information
- Batting: Right-handed
- Bowling: Right-arm fast

Career statistics
Competition	First-class
Matches	217
Runs scored	9,479
Batting average	27.00
100s/50s	12/48
Top score	196
Balls bowled	9,806
Wickets	214
Bowling average	29.59
5 wickets in innings	8
10 wickets in match	1
Best bowling	7/58
Catches/stumpings	147/–
- Source: CricketArchive, 15 April 2023

William Beaumont Burns (29 August 1883 – 7 July 1916) was an English cricketer who played more than 200 first-class matches in the early 20th century, the great bulk of them for Worcestershire, for whom he filled in as captain on a number of occasions when the usual incumbents were not available. Burns's obituary in Wisden described him as a "dashing, hard-hitting batsman" but added that his bowling – which he scarcely pursued until the middle of his career – had to be considered suspect: "the fairness of his delivery was often questioned – and not without good reason".

== Early years ==
Born in Rugeley, Staffordshire, Burns played for that county in the Minor Counties Championship while aged just 16, but his first-class debut came in May 1903 when he represented Worcestershire against Oxford University at The Parks, making 3 and 35. He also played that season against Cambridge University and the Philadelphians, but could not appear in the County Championship because he had not yet qualified. He attended King's Ely.

== Career ==
In 1904 Burns became a near-regular, appearing 19 times, and he finished with 834 runs at 26.00, including an innings of 165 in 180 minutes against Oxford University. In 1906 he hit 1,206 first-class runs at 43.07, with another innings of 165 against Oxford among his three centuries. That winter he visited New Zealand with a Marylebone Cricket Club team: he twice passed 50 in 11 innings and dismissed Wellington's Harold Monaghan.

In the four summers after the 1907 season, he passed 1,000 first-class runs, in 1908 hitting three centuries as he had done two years earlier. In 1909, he scored over 500 runs in five matches and he made his career-best score of 196 against Warwickshire. He and Ted Arnold shared a fifth-wicket stand of 393, which as of 2017 remains a Worcestershire record for this wicket. The innings-and-233-run victory margin remained Worcestershire's widest until 2002.

Burns also developed his bowling. In 1908 he sent down 633 deliveries, almost twice the number he had bowled in his first-class career up to that point, and claimed 16 wickets at 28.50 including a haul of 6–110 against Hampshire. In the following three seasons he bowled around 2,000 deliveries each summer, claiming a total of 145 first-class wickets, and recording career-best figures of 7-58 for the Gentlemen against the Players at The Oval in July 1910. This was the first of three appearances he made in such matches.

In 1912, Burns scored only 599 runs and took only six wickets in his 22 matches, but he recovered his form, with the ball especially, the next season and ended with 42 first-class wickets at 30.81, as well as 866 runs at 27.06. He made his last hundred, 102 not out against Gloucestershire, in June, while he claimed six wickets in an innings twice: once against Hampshire in July, and once in his very last first-class game, Worcestershire's innings victory over Somerset in late August. He took one final wicket in the second innings of that game: that of Len Braund.
According to David Frith's book The Fast Men, Burns was an exceptionally quick bowler – Frank Chester, who played against him before the war, named him the fastest bowler, ahead even of Harold Larwood, that he ever saw – but he was handicapped by suspicions that he threw.

He then emigrated to Canada. In the First World War, he joined the Worcestershire Regiment of the British Army and served as a Second Lieutenant in France.

== Death ==
He was killed in action at Contalmaison during the Battle of the Somme.
