= Christ's College Big School =

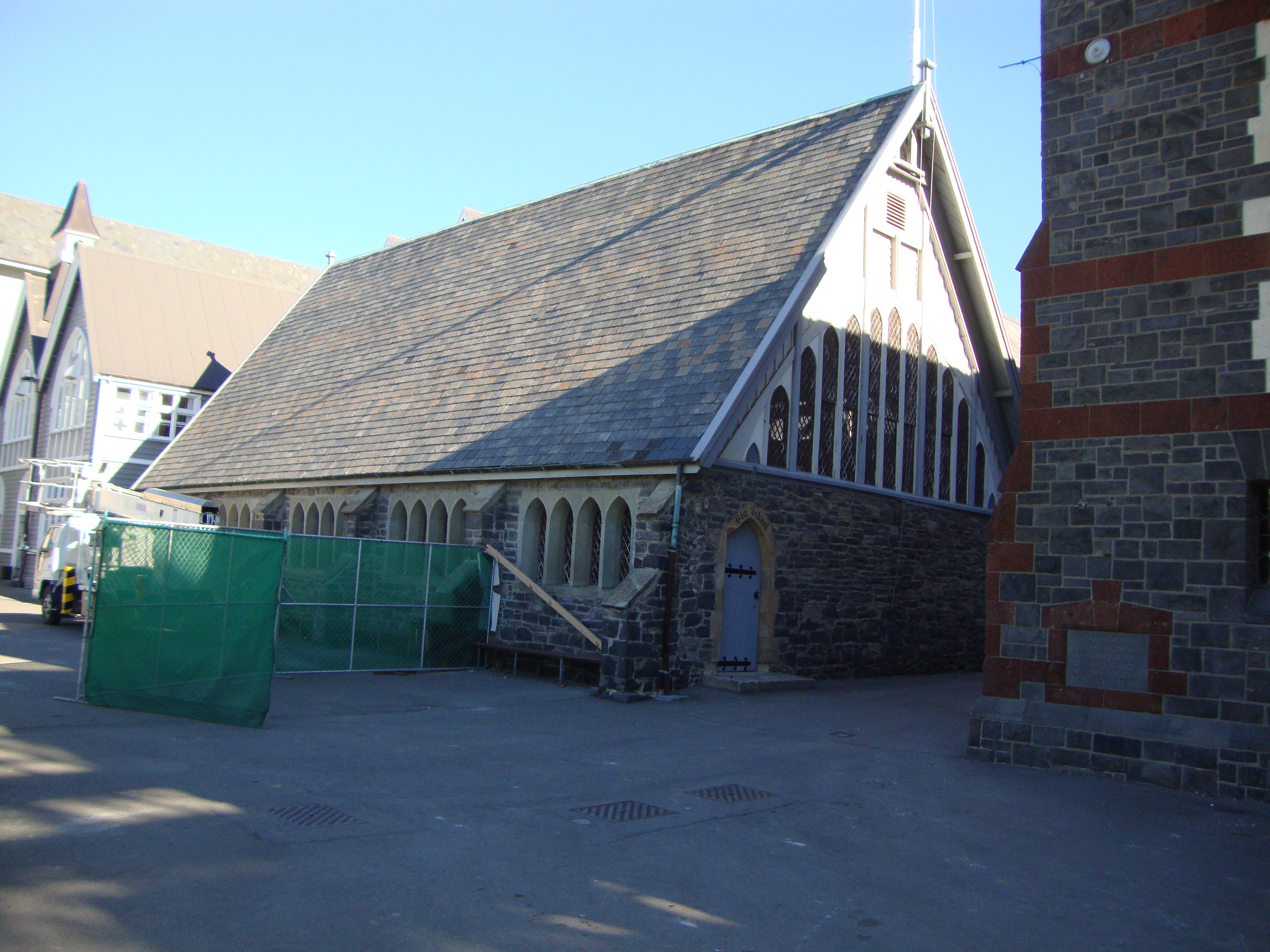
- Earthquake repairs carried out at Big School

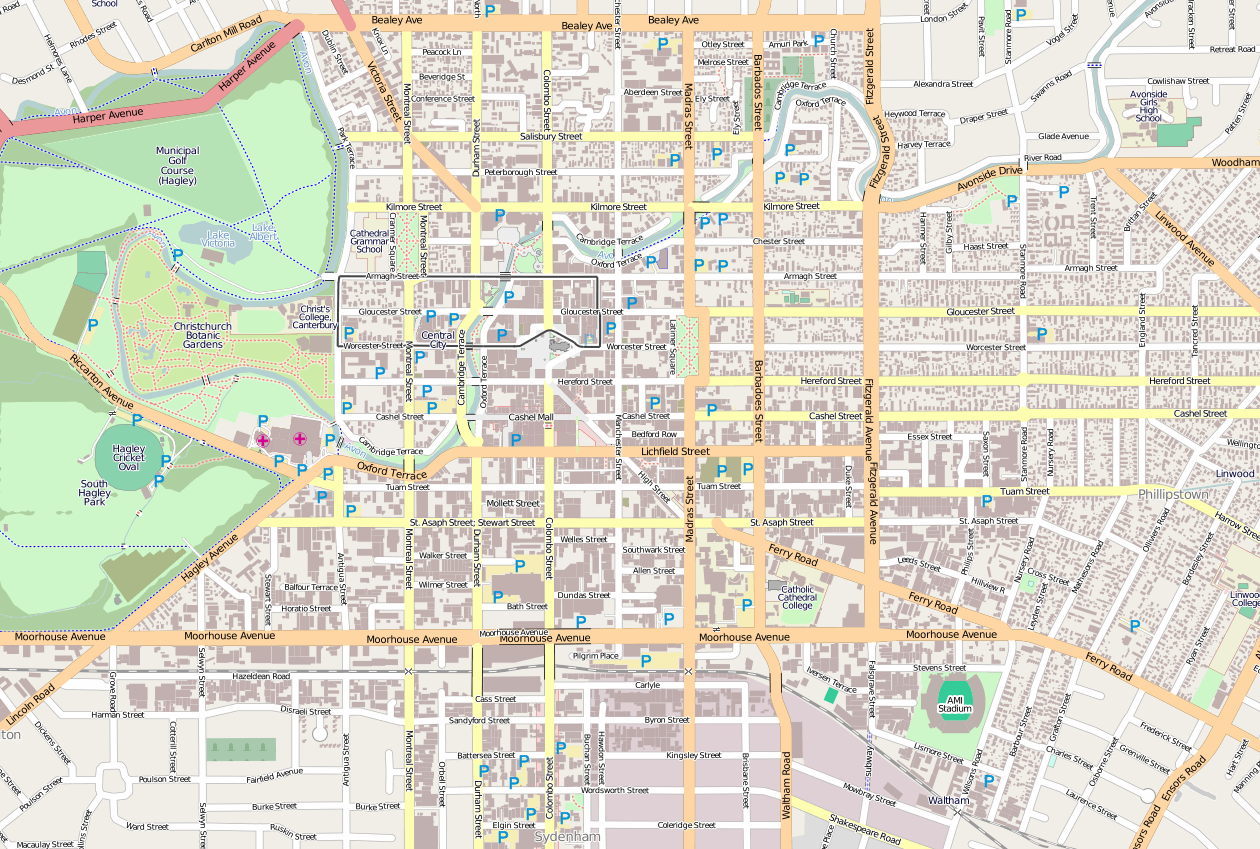
- Location within Christchurch

General information
- Type: School building, now used as a library
- Architectural style: Gothic
- Location: Christ's College, Christchurch Central City, 33 Rolleston Avenue, Christchurch, New Zealand
- Coordinates: 43°31′49″S 172°37′34″E
- Completed: 1863
- Renovated: 1970; 1989
- Owner: Christ's College

Design and construction
- Architect: James FitzGerald

Renovating team
- Architect: Miles Warren

Heritage New Zealand – Category 1
- Designated: 7 April 1983
- Reference no.: 48

References
- "Christ's College Big School". New Zealand Heritage List/Rārangi Kōrero. Heritage New Zealand.

Christ's College Big School is a building of Christ's College in Christchurch, New Zealand. It is registered as a Category I heritage building with Heritage New Zealand.

== History ==
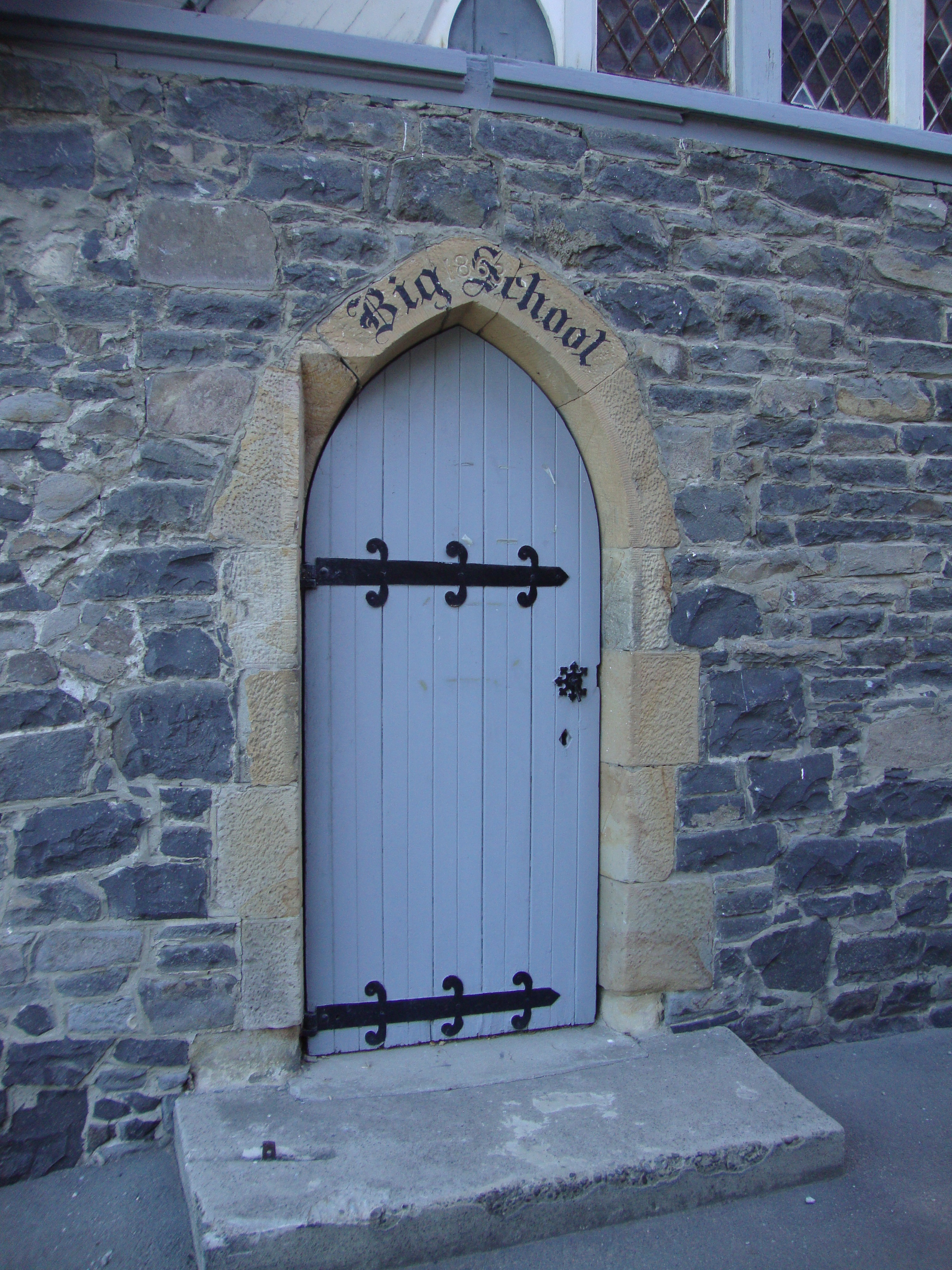
Entrance of Big School

Even before the first settlers came out to Canterbury on the First Four Ships, James FitzGerald had designed what became known as Big School in 1850 back in England as part of the settlement planned by the Canterbury Association. The Canterbury Provincial Council, of which FitzGerald had been the first Superintendent (1853–1857), voted £1,000 for the construction of Big School. The building was constructed in 1863 and was the school's first stone building. It is the only building known to have been designed by FitzGerald.

The building was remodelled in 1970 by Miles Warren, an old boy of the school. It is the oldest building in the school complex. It is the oldest educational building in New Zealand in continuous use. Until 1989, the building was still largely in its original condition, when it was extended towards the west by five gabled wings. Sir Miles was the architect again and he won awards for the extension. The view from the school's quadrangle remained the same. The building is used by the school as a library.

=== Heritage registration ===
The building was registered as a heritage building by the New Zealand Historic Places Trust on 7 April 1983 with registration number 48 classified as A. With the change of the classification system, the building later became a Category I listing.

== Architecture ==
The design of the building is relatively simple. Prior to the 1989 extension, the plan was a rectangle. From the quadrangle, the viewer sees solid buttresses, rows of lancet windows and a steeply pitched roof. The roof pitch allowed for the heavy snow falls that the Canterbury Association wrongly expected in Canterbury. The pattern in the roof tiles is believed to have been added in 1896. While in use as a school, the interior was gloomy, according to a 21st-century source, as the windows were whitewashed.

== See also ==
- List of historic places in Christchurch
