= Henry Jacobs (priest) =

Anglican Dean of Christchurch (1824–1901)

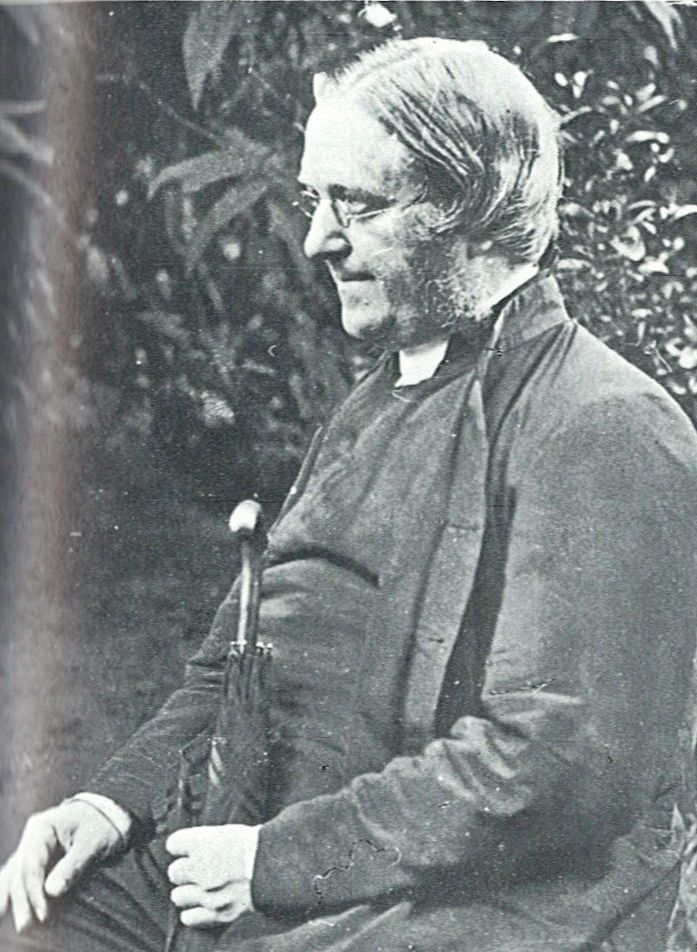

Henry Jacobs (3 January 1824 – 6 January 1901) was a Church of England priest and schoolmaster, and the first Dean of Christchurch, New Zealand.

== Biography ==
Jacobs was born at Chale Abbey, Isle of Wight, the son of William Hearn Jacobs and Ann Tucker. The Jacobs were substantial landowners on the Isle of Wight and two of Henry's ancestors, the Reverend Matthew and the Reverend John Hearn, were rectors of Chale in the 17th century. Jacobs was descended from many of the principal families on the Isle of Wight, including the Oglanders, Worsleys, Urrys, Dingleys and Leighs. He was educated at Charterhouse School where he was captain of the school. From Charterhouse he gained a scholarship to Queen's College, Oxford. He was awarded an MA degree in 1848, ordained deacon in 1847 and priest in 1848. He became a Michel Fellow of Queen's College.

From 1847 to 1848 he was curate of Bussage, Gloucestershire, in 1848 he was briefly headmaster of St Nicolas' College, Shoreham-by-Sea, and from 1849 to 1850 curate of All Saints Church, Poplar, London. In 1850 he sailed to New Zealand on Sir George Seymour to be classical professor of a proposed new college in Canterbury. Sir George Seymour was one of the First Four Ships to carry emigrants from England to the new colony of Canterbury in New Zealand on behalf of the Canterbury Association. On arrival he conducted the first Church of England service in the Canterbury region and in July 1851, conducted the service at the opening of the first church in Christchurch. From 1852 he was headmaster of the Christ's College Grammar School, Christchurch.

He was appointed professor of divinity at the new college in 1855. Dean Jacobs opened Christ's College Grammar School on 21 April 1862, as its first headmaster, and became Sub-Warden in the Deed of Foundation of the College on 21 May 1855, and shortly afterwards Watts-Russell Professor. There is a boarding house there named 'Jacobs'. In 1863 he resigned his headmastership to become the incumbent of the parish of St Michael and All Angels, Christchurch, was subsequently collated archdeacon and, in June 1866, appointed the first Dean of Christchurch. In 1872 he accepted the responsibility of editing the New Zealand Church News. He also published a number of pamphlets and poems.

After returning from a visit to England in 1891, he suffered a paralysis, died in 1901 and was buried in Barbadoes Street Cemetery in Christchurch. He had married twice: firstly in London in 1850, Charlotte Emily Corrick and secondly, in Christchurch in 1871, Emily Rose Thompson. His two children by his first wife died young; he had several more by his second.
