= David Monaghan =

New Zealand cricketer and New Zealand Army soldier

Personal information
- Full name: David Wyatt Monaghan
- Born: 13 July 1922; Pahiatua, Wairarapa, New Zealand
- Died: 27 January 1944 (aged 21); Caserta, Campania, Italy
- Batting: Unknown
- Relatives: Harold Monaghan (father)

Career statistics
Competition	First-class
Matches	1
Runs scored	19
Batting average	9.50
100s/50s	0/0
Top score	10
Catches/stumpings	0/–
- Source: Cricinfo, 2 April 2021

David Wyatt Monaghan (13 July 1922 – 27 January 1944) was a New Zealand first-class cricketer and New Zealand Army soldier.

The third son of the archdeacon and cricketer Harold Monaghan and his wife, Jessie, Monaghan was born at Pahiatua in July 1922. He received his early education at Timaru on the South Island, before attending Christ's College, Christchurch. He was a talented sportsman, representing the college in cricket, football, athletics and swimming, in addition to being a champion gymnast in 1940. He was nominated for a team of New Zealand schoolboys to tour Australia in 1939, but the outbreak of the Second World War in Europe led to the tour being cancelled.

Upon completing his education in 1940, Monaghan gained employment in the Public Trust Office in Timaru. By 1943, he was serving in the New Zealand Army as a signalman in the Royal New Zealand Corps of Signals.

He made a single appearance in first-class cricket for the South Island Army cricket team against the North Island Army cricket team at Wellington in February 1943. He made scores of 10 and 9 and was dismissed by Jack Lamason and Tom Pritchard respectively.

By July 1943, Monaghan had gone to Europe with the New Zealand Expeditionary Force, where he saw action during the Italian campaign. He died from sickness in January 1944 at Caserta in Italy. He was buried at the Caserta War Cemetery. Monaghan's brother, Gerald, was also killed in the war.
