= Ellesmere (New Zealand electorate) =

Ellesmere was a parliamentary electorate in the Canterbury region of New Zealand. It existed for two periods between 1861 and 1928 and was represented by six Members of Parliament.

== Population centres ==
Ellesmere was a rural electorate, with the locality Ellesmere having given it its name. It was created in the 1860 Electoral Redistribution and was used in its initial form for the 1861 election. It was located on Banks Peninsula and included Sumner, Ferrymead, settlements around Lyttelton Harbour excluding Lyttelton itself (which had its own electorate). On the peninsula, its boundary with Akaroa was east of Port Levy. In the south-west, it bordered Lake Ellesmere / Te Waihora but surprisingly, the lake that gave the electorate its name was not included in the electorate, but belonged to Cheviot.

The electorate was abolished between 1866 and 1890. In December 1887, the House of Representatives voted to reduce its membership from general electorates from 91 to 70. The 1890 electoral redistribution used the same 1886 census data used for the 1887 electoral redistribution. In addition, three-member electorates were introduced in the four main centres. This resulted in a major restructuring of electorates, and Ellesmere was one of eight electorates to be re-created for the 1890 election. It covered an entirely different area than before, and it was placed between the Ashburton and Selwyn electorates, thus pushing them apart. In the east, it covered most of Lake Ellesmere, but excluded Kaitorete Spit. In the west, it stopped short of the Ashburton River and did not include Ashburton itself. It went as far inland as the headwaters of the Rakaia River. Southbridge, Rakaia, Leeston, and Methven fell into the electorate.

The 1892 Electoral Redistribution, which took effect with the 1893 election, changed the shape of the Ellesmere electorate dramatically. It replaced the Akaroa electorate and thus covered all of Banks Peninsula including the town of Akaroa, plus the settlements of Governors Bay and Rāpaki. A small area of land around Lake Ellesmere also belonged to the electorate, and this now included Kaitorete Spit. Southbridge and Leeston remained in the electorate (just), but all the hinterland (including Rakaia and Methven) was lost to the Selwyn and Ashburton electorates.

The 1896 Electoral Redistribution, which took effect that year, established the electorate's area for the next six years. Boundary changes were slight, with the southern settlements along Lyttelton Harbour going to the Lyttelton electorate. The 1902 Electoral Redistribution, which took effect that year, established the electorate's area until 1908. Boundary changes were again minimal, with the electorate regaining the southern settlements along Lyttelton Harbour.

The 1907 Electoral Redistribution, which took effect in 1908 election, changed the boundaries more significantly. The Lyttelton electorate took some area of the peninsula, and Port Levy went to that electorate. The neighbouring Courtenay electorate was abolished and replaced with Riccarton, with Ellesmere's boundary shifting north-west to the South Island Main Trunk Railway, and the town of Lincoln was gained.

Through the 1911 Electoral Redistribution, which took effect with the 1911 election, the Lyttelton electorate expanded further onto Banks Peninsula and took its northern half. This lost settlements like Pigeon Bay and Okains Bay.

The 1918 Electoral Redistribution, which took effect in 1919 election, saw a complete adjustment of the electorate's boundaries. Three quarters of Banks Peninsula, including the town of Akaroa, were now covered by the Lyttelton electorate. The Ellesmere electorate went across the Main South railway and extended all the way to the boundary between Canterbury and the West Coast, with Arthur's Pass and Harper's Pass located on that boundary. This brought many small communities on the Canterbury Plains into the electorate, including Springfield, plus settlement in the Southern Alps like Arthur's Pass and Cass.

The 1922 Electoral Redistribution, which took effect that year, established the electorate's area for its final six years. Near the coast, the boundary shifted south and Rakaia was gained again. In the Canterbury hinterland, the boundaries were redrawn completely and the electorate moved south significantly, losing area to Hurunui in the north and gaining significantly from the Ashburton electorate. In its final shape, the inland part of the electorate was centred on the Rakaia River. Lake Coleridge was for the first time within the electorate, and Methven was gained again. The 1927 Electoral Redistribution, which took effect with the 1928 election, saw the Ellesmere electorate abolished and replaced with the Mid-Canterbury electorate.

== History ==
Ellesmere was first established for the 1861 election. At the next election in 1866, it was replaced with the Mount Herbert electorate. It was re-established for the 1890 election and existed until 1928.

Thomas Rowley was elected unopposed on 25 January 1861. He resigned on 25 April 1862. James FitzGerald won the resulting by-election until the electorate was abolished in 1866; FitzGerald successfully stood in Christchurch instead.

John Hall, who had previously represented the Selwyn electorate, won the 1890 election against John McLachlan. These were to be Hall's final three years in Parliament before he retired, during which he achieved his "last political triumph" of successful parliamentary leadership of the women's suffrage campaign.

William Rolleston and William Montgomery contested the 1893 election. It was won by Montgomery for the Liberal Party, whose father, William Montgomery Sr., had previously represented the Akaroa electorate, and constituted Rolleston's second parliamentary defeat since he had first been elected in 1868. In 1896, Montgomery was challenged by Frederick Arthur Anson, a sheep farmer from Peraki standing for the opposition.

Montgomery was defeated in the 1899 election by the exceptionally wealthy former lawyer and now farmer Heaton Rhodes, who was living in his 40-room mansion Otahuna on Banks Peninsula. Rhodes, a conservative politician who joined the Reform Party, was to hold the electorate until 1925, when he retired on medical advice, only to be promptly appointed to the Legislative Council.

=== Members of Parliament ===
The electorate was represented by six Members of Parliament.

Key

Independent Conservative Liberal Reform

Election	Winner
1861 election	Thomas Rowley
1862 by-election	James FitzGerald
(Electorate abolished 1866–1890, see Mount Herbert)
1890 election	John Hall
1893 election	William Montgomery
1896 election	William Montgomery
1899 election	Heaton Rhodes
1902 election	Heaton Rhodes
1905 election	Heaton Rhodes
1905 election	Heaton Rhodes
1911 election	Heaton Rhodes
1914 election	Heaton Rhodes
1919 election	Heaton Rhodes
1922 election	Heaton Rhodes
1925 election	David Jones
(Electorate abolished 1928, see Mid-Canterbury)

== Election results ==
=== 1925 election ===
1925 general election: Ellesmere
Party	Candidate	Votes	%	±%
Reform	David Jones	4,014	54.29	
Liberal	Jeremiah Connolly	3,380	45.71	
Majority		634	8.57	
Informal votes		143	1.90	
Registered electors		8,121		
Turnout		7,537	92.81	

=== 1919 election ===
1919 general election: Ellesmere
Party	Candidate	Votes	%	±%
Reform	Heaton Rhodes	3,582	55.84	
Liberal	George Barclay	2,833	44.16	
Majority		749	11.68	
Informal votes		74	1.14	
Turnout		6,489	75.66	
Registered electors		8,577		

=== 1899 election ===
1899 general election: Ellesmere
Party	Candidate	Votes	%	±%
Conservative	Heaton Rhodes	1,760	51.52	
Liberal	William Montgomery	1,656	48.48	
Majority		104	3.04	
Turnout		3,416	82.89	
Registered electors		4,121		

=== 1893 election ===
1893 general election: Ellesmere
Party	Candidate	Votes	%	±%
Liberal	William Montgomery	1,576	55.12	
Independent	William Rolleston	1,283	44.88	
Majority		293	10.25	+2.80
Turnout		2,859	84.69	+25.66
Registered electors		3,376		

=== 1890 election ===
1890 general election: Ellesmere
Party	Candidate	Votes	%	±%
Conservative	John Hall	757	53.73	
Liberal	John McLachlan	652	46.27	
Majority		105	7.45	
Turnout		1,409	59.03	
Registered electors		2,387		
