= Thomas Rowley (runholder) =

New Zealand politician

Member of the New Zealand Parliament for Ellesmere
- In office 25 January 1861 – 25 April 1862
- Preceded by: New constituency
- Succeeded by: James FitzGerald

Personal details
- Born: England
- Died: 1903 Southwold, Suffolk
- Party: None
- Spouse: Emily Rowley (née Mathias)
- Relations: Thomas Rowley (father)

Thomas Rowley (died 1903) was an early settler in Canterbury, New Zealand. His father was a member of the Canterbury Association and Dean-designate for Christ Church Cathedral, but never came to the colony. Thomas Rowley and one brother emigrated, and he became a significant runholder. He later started acting as an agent for absentee landowners. He briefly served as a Member of Parliament for one of the rural Canterbury electorates. Rowley was active in church matters and married a daughter of Octavius Mathias, the first vicar of the Church of St Michael and All Angels. After 11 years in New Zealand, he returned to live in England.

== Early life ==
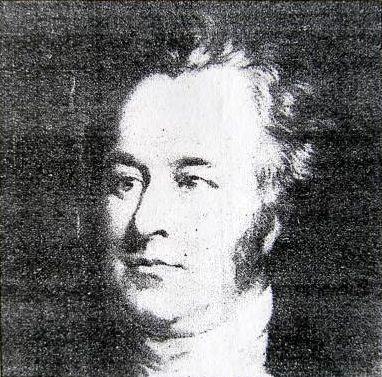
Portrait of Thomas Rowley senior

Rowley was the eldest son of Thomas Rowley (1797–1877), a headmaster of Bridgnorth Grammar School.

Rowley senior joined the Canterbury Association on 10 April 1851 as a committee member. He purchased land from the association in Canterbury, New Zealand. Rowley junior bought land at Barrys Bay at the head of Akaroa Harbour; rural section (RS) 63 (it is believed, though, that Rowley senior paid for this). Rowley senior bought RS 85 west of Christchurch in the Riccarton area, from which the suburb of Middleton developed. Rowley senior was chosen as the Dean-designate for the yet to be built Christ Church Cathedral, but he never came out to the colony. His appointment upset Bishop Selwyn, and the proposed cathedral chapter was dropped again until the cathedral was built.

== Life in New Zealand ==
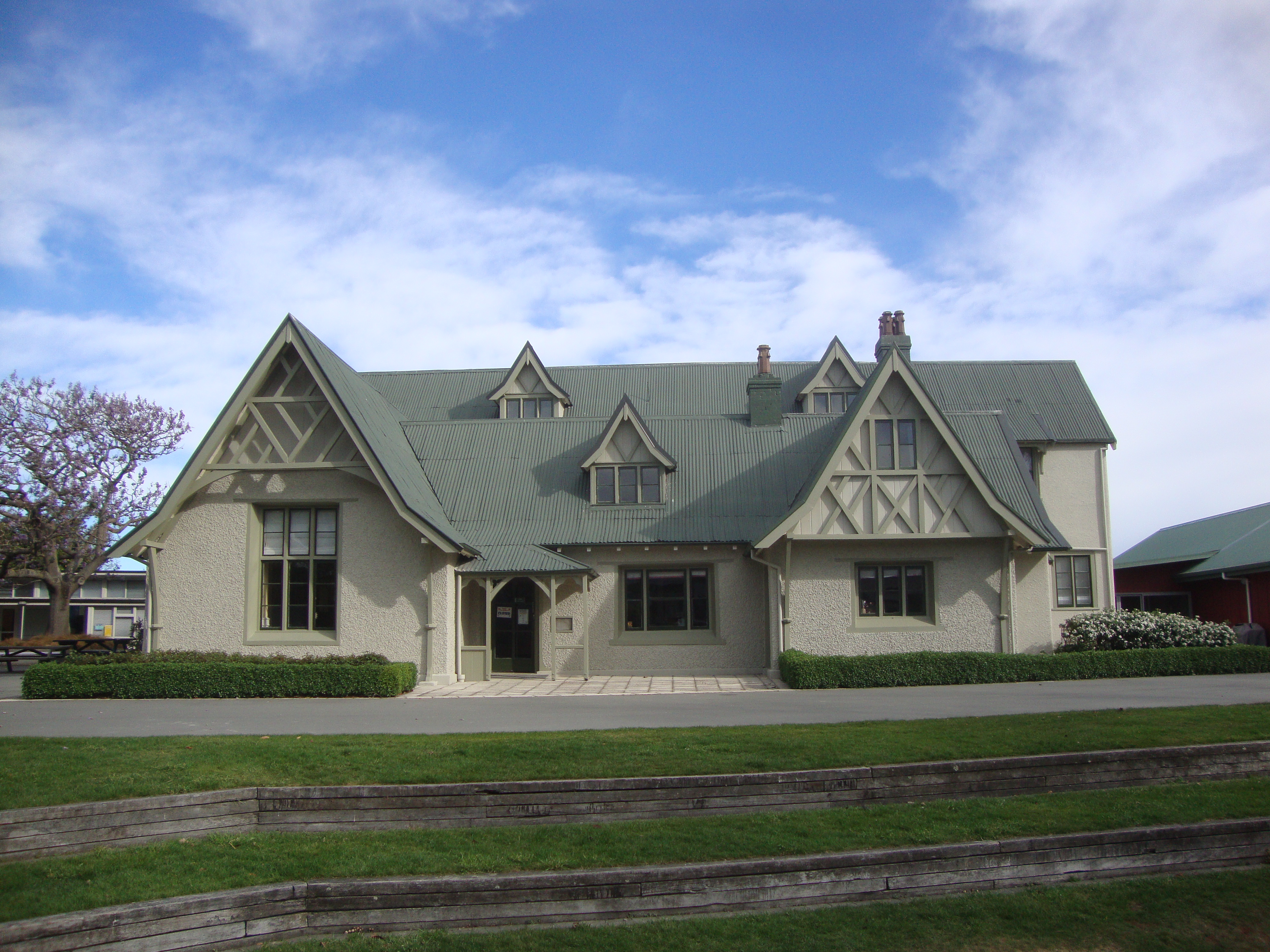
Rowley's homestead is now the Primary library of Middleton Grange School

Thomas Rowley arrived in Lyttelton on 2 February 1853 on board the Minerva. His younger brother John Cotton Rowley (d. 1886 aged 46) also came to Canterbury, but at a different time. In about 1855, he had a homestead built on RS 85 in Riccarton that he called Middleton. Rowley sold the land and the homestead to Charles Bowen. The homestead is today the library of primary pupils of Middleton Grange School.

Rowley bought further landholdings once in New Zealand. In 1854, he bought Sandy Knolls (Runs 26 and 114). The land comprised 15,000 acres (6,100 ha) and was adjacent to the Waimakariri River. Whilst all his runs had managers, he spent much of his time here. In August 1853, he bought the lease of Homebrook (Run 100), which he almost immediately sold again.

Rowley also started acting as agent for absentee landowners. In that capacity, he assisted Robert Tooth with the purchase of the leasehold of Mt. Possession (Run 53) from John Acland and Charles George Tripp. Rowley bought Alford (Run 126) together with Frederick Tooth, a brother of Robert Tooth. Another purchase was Clent Hills (Runs 174, 262, 298, and 377), which he bought in about 1859 and on-sold to Robert Tooth in 1865.

Buying rural sections gave the right to choose town sections, and as part of the above purchases, Rowley junior chose eight quarter acre sections in central Christchurch; they made up around half the block described by Cathedral Square, Worcester, Manchester, Hereford, and Colombo Streets. Rowley sold that land when he left New Zealand, and in 1905, much of the land fronting Worcester Street was taken by the Government under the Public Works Act for the Government Building.

Rowley was active in church matters and was a supporter of St Peter's Church in Upper Riccarton, not far away from his Middleton homestead. When St Peter's was dedicated in 1858, a large group of parishioners was entertained at Middleton. Rowley was also on the commission that organised the construction of ChristChurch Cathedral.

On 23 July 1857, Rowley married Emily Mathias, the eldest daughter of Octavius Mathias. Her father was the first vicar of the Church of St Michael and All Angels, which at the time was Christchurch's pro-cathedral. His younger brother, John Cotton Rowley, married Mary Rose Mathias, the youngest daughter of Octavius Mathias.

New Zealand Parliament
Years	Term	Electorate	Party
1861–1862	3rd	Ellesmere	Independent

Rowley was elected unopposed on 25 January 1861 for Ellesmere. He resigned the following year.

Rowley Peak behind Fairlie was named after Thomas Rowley senior. The mountain has since been renamed Fox Peak and is now a ski-field.

== Later life in England ==
In 1863, Rowley decided to return to England, and he advertised that he needed to receive open accounts by the end of the year. Rowley, his wife and four children left New Zealand on 4 February 1864 on the White Star for London to settle on Guernsey. He sent ferrets to Canterbury in 1867, which are these days one of the prime pests. He died in 1903 at Southwold, Suffolk.

New Zealand Parliament
New constituency	Member of Parliament for Ellesmere; 1861–1862	Succeeded by James FitzGerald
