= James FitzGerald (New Zealand politician) =

New Zealand politician (1818–1896)

The Honourable James FitzGerald
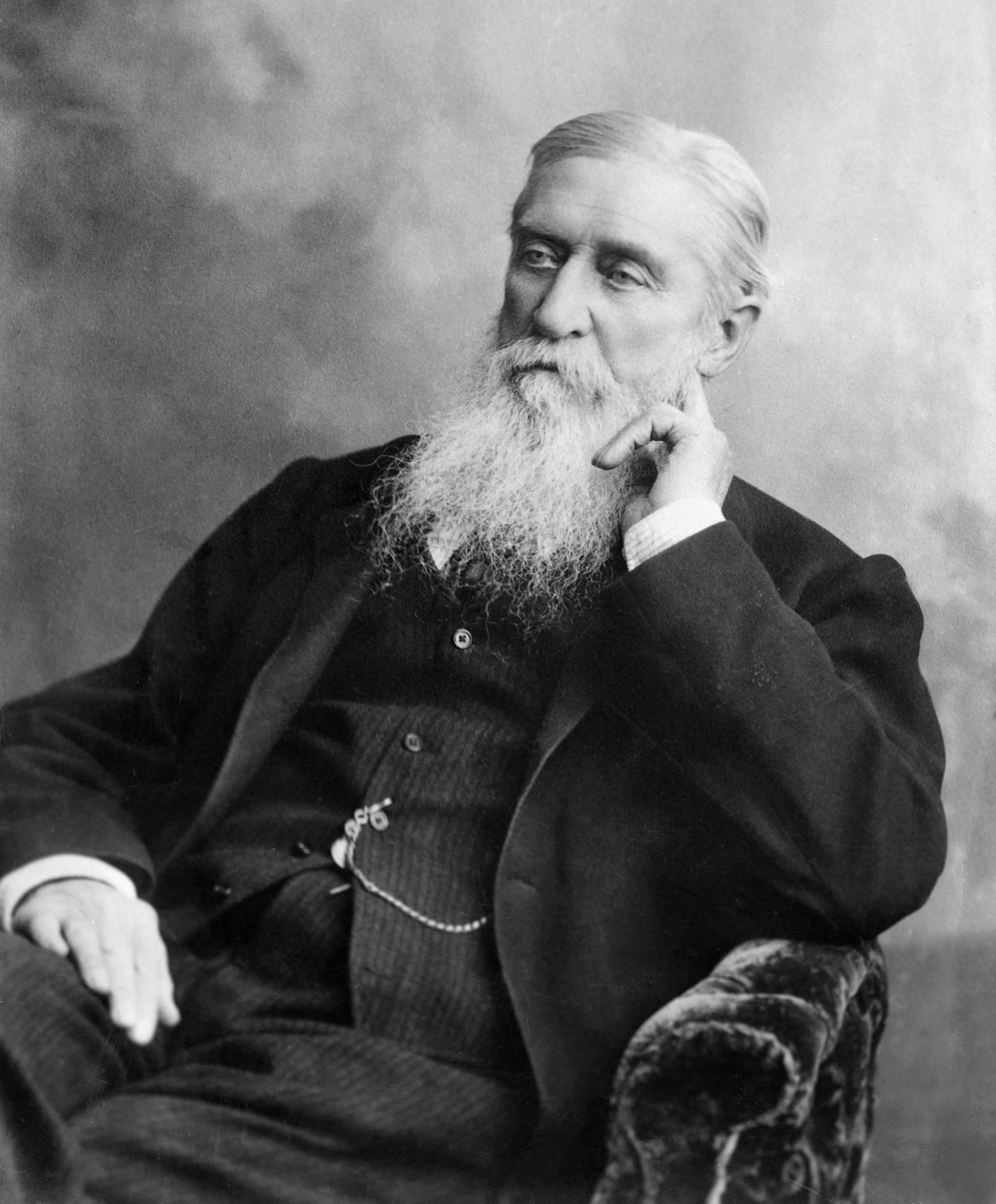
- James Edward Fitzgerald c. 1890

6th Minister of Native Affairs
- In office 12 August 1865 – 16 October 1865

Member of the New Zealand Parliament for Lyttelton
- In office 1853–1857

Member of the New Zealand Parliament for Ellesmere
- In office 1862–1866

Member of the New Zealand Parliament for City of Christchurch
- In office 1866–1867

1st Superintendent of Canterbury Province
- In office 20 July 1853 – Oct 1857

Personal details
- Born: James Edward FitzGerald; 4 March 1818 Bath, England
- Died: 2 August 1896 (aged 78) Wellington, New Zealand
- Spouse: Frances (Fanny) Erskine Draper (married 1850)
- Relations: Richard Fitzgerald (grandfather); Lucius O'Brien (grandfather); Gerard Fitzgerald (brother)
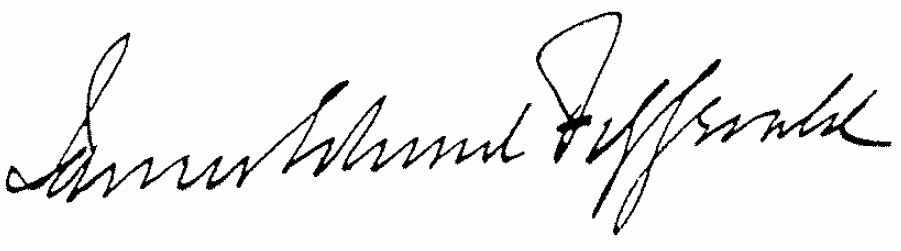
- Signature

James Edward FitzGerald (4 March 1818 – 2 August 1896) was a New Zealand politician. According to some historians, he should be considered the country's first premier, although a more conventional view is that neither he nor his successor should properly be given that title. He was a notable campaigner for New Zealand self-governance. He was the first Superintendent of the Canterbury Province.

== Early life ==
FitzGerald was born on 4 March 1818 in Bath, England. His parents, Gerald FitzGerald and Katherine O'Brien, were Irish, and FitzGerald is known to have cherished his connection with Ireland, despite being educated in England. He was educated first in Bath, and then at Christ's College of the University of Cambridge. He initially sought a commission in the Royal Engineers, but poor eyesight made this impossible. Instead, he began working for the British Museum's Antiquities department, and became the museum's Assistant Secretary.

FitzGerald gradually became concerned with the alleviation of poverty, an interest spurred by the problems of the Great Famine of Ireland. His suggested solution to poverty was emigration to the colonies, where more opportunities might exist for prosperity. As such, he became heavily involved in the promotion and planning of new colonies. In 1849, he became secretary of the Canterbury Association, responsible for the Anglican settlement at Canterbury, New Zealand. The settlement was well organised by the Canterbury Association; the printing press for the colony's newspaper was sent with the First Four Ships (FitzGerald becoming the first editor of the Lyttelton Times) and the main building for the settlement's school, later known as Christ's College Big School, was designed by FitzGerald in 1850 in England. The building was constructed in 1863 and is the only building known to have been designed by FitzGerald.

FitzGerald married Frances Erskine Draper on 22 August 1850, and soon afterwards quarrelled with her father. As a result, FitzGerald and his wife left for the Canterbury colony. They arrived in Lyttelton, the colony's port, on 16 December 1850 aboard the Charlotte Jane.

In Christchurch, the colony's main settlement, FitzGerald had a number of roles. He continued to act as an agent for the Canterbury Association, but also became a sub-inspector of police. He later established a cattle and dairy farm, and became the founding editor of the Lyttelton Times. Gradually, FitzGerald became one of the prominent public figures of the area.

== Political career ==
=== Provincial superintendent ===
In November 1852, a deputation put a requisition to John Robert Godley, asking him to allow himself to be nominated for the first election for Superintendent of the Canterbury Province; Fitzgerald was part of that deputation. Godley declined, and in July 1853, FitzGerald, Colonel James Campbell and Henry Tancred contested the election. They received 136, 94 and 89 votes, respectively. Campbell protested about the election, as the returning officer had indicated to the voters that he could not be elected, as he had been struck off the electoral list. But the protest came to nothing, and Fitzgerald was declared the first Superintendent of the Canterbury Province.

A major part of his work as Superintendent was an attempt to increase Canterbury's self-government, drawing the province's "cabinet" from the elected Council rather than appointing it himself. His goal was to make the province's executive responsible to its legislature. He remained Superintendent until he retired on 28 September 1857.

=== Member of Parliament ===
New Zealand Parliament
Years	Term	Electorate	Party
1853–1855	1st	Lyttelton	Independent
1855–1857	2nd	Lyttelton	Independent
1862–1866	3rd	Ellesmere	Independent
1866–1867	4th	Christchurch	Independent

When the 1st New Zealand Parliament was called, FitzGerald was elected MP for the Lyttelton electorate, and represented it from 1853 to 1857, when he resigned during the term of the 2nd New Zealand Parliament. Despite his election to Parliament, he chose to retain the Superintendency of Canterbury, a decision criticised by some. In Parliament, FitzGerald argued strongly in favour of "responsible government," attempting to make New Zealand's executive responsible to Parliament rather than the Governor. This led to the formation of the 1854 FitzGerald Ministry, in which the acting Governor, Robert Wynyard, appointed FitzGerald, Henry Sewell, Frederick Weld, and Thomas Bartley to the Executive Council. They were later joined briefly by Dillon Bell, a member of the Legislative Council.

FitzGerald was chosen to lead this delegation, which lasted from 14 June 1854 to 2 August 1854, and is therefore sometimes said to have headed New Zealand's first "cabinet". He had no formal title, however, and did not have sufficient powers to actually govern. As such, most historians do not consider him to have been prime minister as the term is used today. FitzGerald accepted the position in the belief that full authority would later be transferred from Wynyard's appointees to the new cabinet, and was consequently angry when Wynyard claimed that royal assent (which had not been given) was necessary for this change to occur. Seven weeks after their appointment, FitzGerald's cabinet resigned, and was replaced by another cabinet of four persons headed by Thomas Forsaith.

Later, when the 2nd New Zealand Parliament managed to obtain the power that had eluded the 1st, FitzGerald was too ill to attend. Instead, Henry Sewell (one of FitzGerald's colleagues in the first attempted cabinet) was asked to form a government. In 1857, FitzGerald resigned from Parliament on the advice of his doctors, and also decided not to seek re-election as provincial superintendent. Instead, he left Lyttelton on 30 September on the James Gibson for Sydney and returned to England, where he resumed his work for the Canterbury Association. During his time in England, he was offered governorships of both British Columbia and Queensland, but his ill health prevented him from accepting.

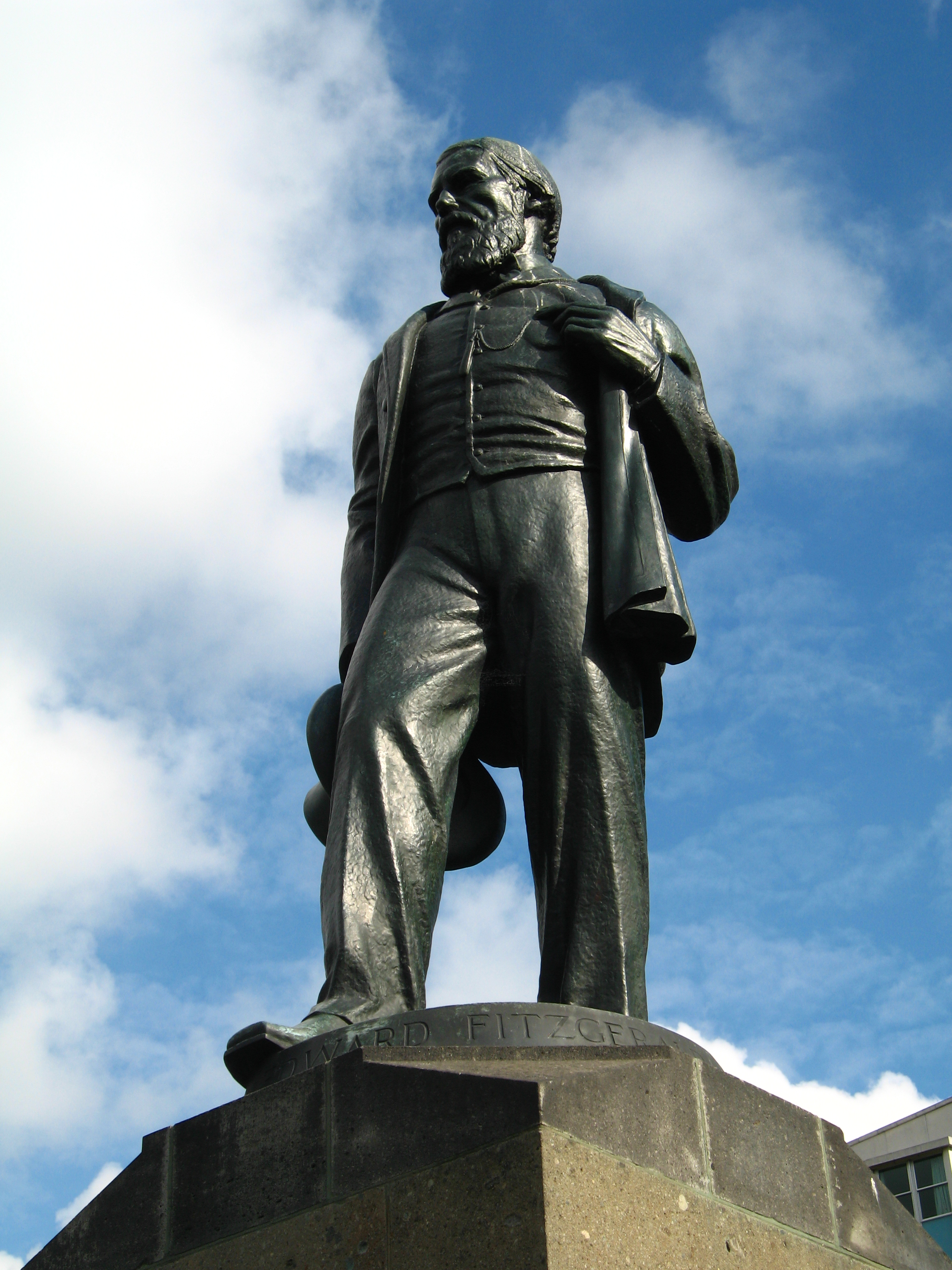
Statue of FitzGerald, Cashel St, Christchurch

By 1860, he had returned to New Zealand on the Matoaka, and shortly afterwards won election to the Canterbury Provincial Council; first for the Akaroa electorate in May 1861, and then in the Town of Akaroa electorate from September 1861 to December 1862. He also founded The Press, which remains Christchurch's largest newspaper today. In 1862, he returned to national politics. The resignation of Thomas Rowley in the Ellesmere electorate caused the 12 July 1862 Ellesmere by-election, which FitzGerald won. He represented the electorate until the end of the parliamentary term in 1866, and then successfully stood in the City of Christchurch electorate in 1866 (elected unopposed), from which he resigned the following year.

In Parliament, he strongly advocated peaceful negotiations in the New Zealand Wars, supporting Māori rights and condemning land confiscation as an "enormous crime". He also campaigned to have primary responsibility for relations with the Māori transferred from the Governor to Parliament. Other suggestions he made included reserving a third of Parliament for Māori politicians, recognition of the Māori King movement, and the withdrawal of British troops from New Zealand. FitzGerald strongly believed that if Māori and colonists did not make a deliberate attempt at reconciliation, one or both would eventually be destroyed.

On 5 November 1863, he attempted to convince Parliament that the New Zealand Settlements Act 1863 was contrary to the Treaty of Waitangi "which distinctly guaranteed and pledged the faith of the Crown that the lands of the natives shall not be taken from them except by the ordinary process of law—that is, taken within the meaning of the Treaty." He also stated that in his opinion, the purpose of the Act was to acquire Maori land.

In 1865, he had a two-month term as Minister of Native Affairs in the government of Frederick Weld (another colleague from the first provisional cabinet), but did not succeed in implementing many of his policies.

His brother Gerard represented the Hokitika electorate for one term in Parliament.

== Later life ==
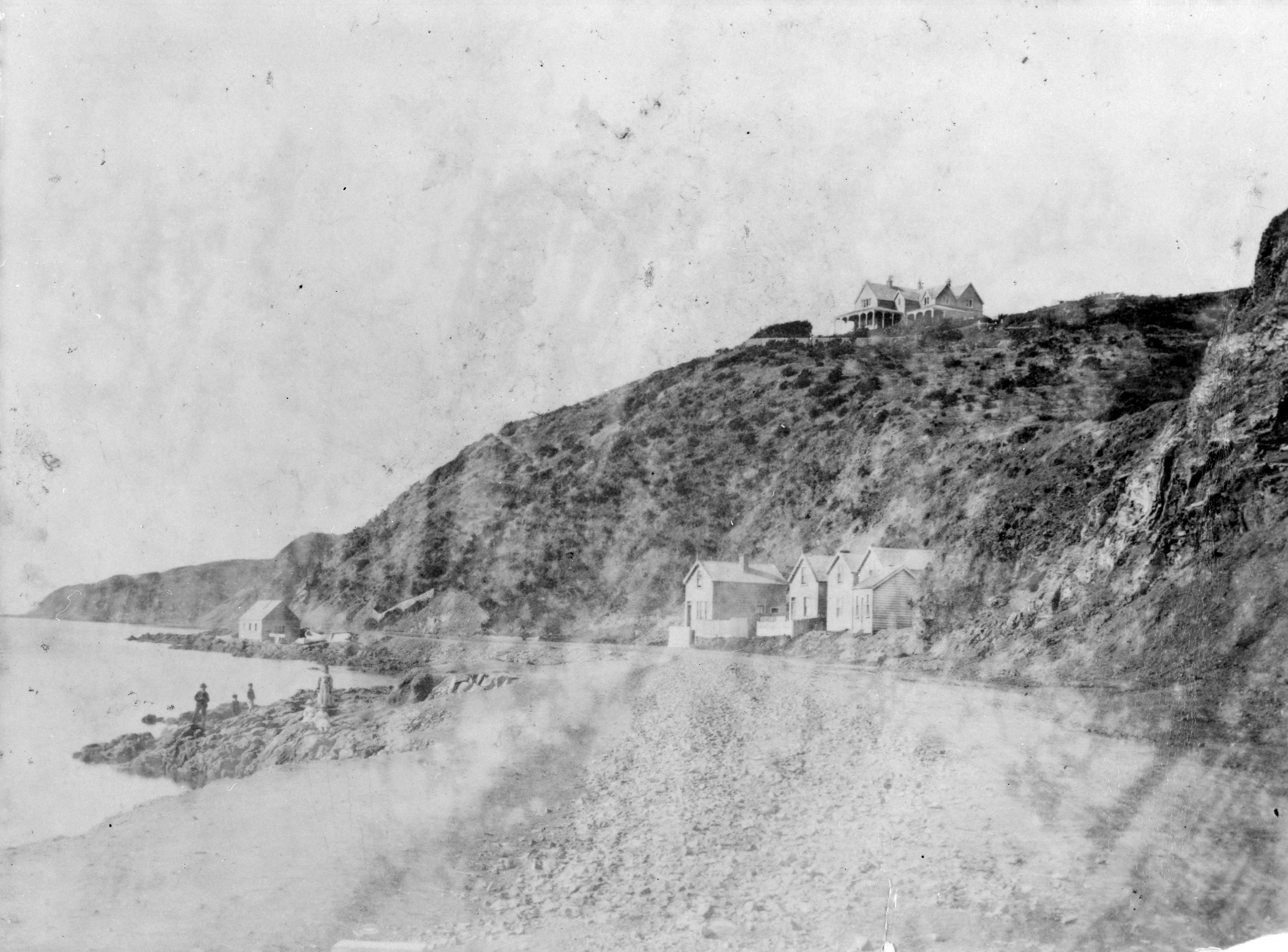
Oriental Bay, Wellington showing FitzGerald's house on top of the hill

In 1867, FitzGerald retired from politics completely. He subsequently moved to Wellington and was appointed comptroller of the public account, supervising all government expenditures. Later, he also acted as Auditor-General. He retained these positions until his death. He was also seriously involved in the establishment of the Public Service Association, a union for all government employees.

FitzGerald was also active in the cultural life of the capital. He was known as a painter (mostly watercolours), public speaker, and debater, and also wrote poetry and drama.

FitzGerald died in Wellington on 2 August 1896, aged 78. He was buried in the Bolton Street Cemetery. Two of his children who both died in 1880 share the grave, as well as a female relative who died in 1886. His wife died on 8 July 1900 and is also buried in this plot. The grave is stop number 26 of the lower Bolton Memorial Trail.

== Notes ==
New Zealand Parliament
New constituency	Member of Parliament for Lyttelton; 1853–1857	Succeeded by Crosbie Ward
Preceded by Thomas Rowley	Member of Parliament for Ellesmere; 1862–1866	In abeyance Title next held by John Hall
Preceded by John Cracroft Wilson	Member of Parliament for Christchurch; 1866–1867	Succeeded by William Travers
Political offices
New office	Superintendent of Canterbury Province; 1853–57	Succeeded by William Sefton Moorhouse
Preceded by Walter Mantell	Minister of Native Affairs; 1865	Succeeded by Andrew Russell
