= Roddy Fulton =

New Zealand cricketer (born 1951)

Roddy Woodhouse Fulton (born 5 August 1951 in Christchurch) grew up in North Canterbury and attended Christ's College Secondary School in Canterbury and during his years at school captained the cricket 1st XI and rugby union 1st XV.

He played representative cricket for Canterbury and Northern Districts from 1972 to 1985 captaining both teams with players such as John Wright, Geoff Howarth and Sir Richard Hadlee playing under his captaincy. Roddy Fulton was a powerful left-handed batsmen and occasionally bowled right-arm medium pace.

He also played two games for New Zealand A before injuring his right shoulder while playing for Middlesex County Cricket Club 2nd XI which spelled an end to his cricket career. He played alongside the likes of John Emburey, Mike Gatting, and Larry Gomes. During this time Fulton was on the fringe of selection for New Zealand.

In later years he worked as a selector for Canterbury Cricket between 1993-1994 and then worked for New Zealand Cricket as Director in 1995. He is married to Kate and has three children Sam, Ben, and Jessica. He is the Uncle of Peter Fulton who has played for New Zealand and Canterbury.

Since NZ Cricket he has developed his own business buying and selling thoroughbred race horses and is well known amongst the New Zealand horse racing industry.

He is also the nephew of Dame Kate Harcourt, and cousin of Miranda Harcourt and Gordon Harcourt, who has appeared on the TV series Fair Go.
