= Peter Fulton =

New Zealand cricketer

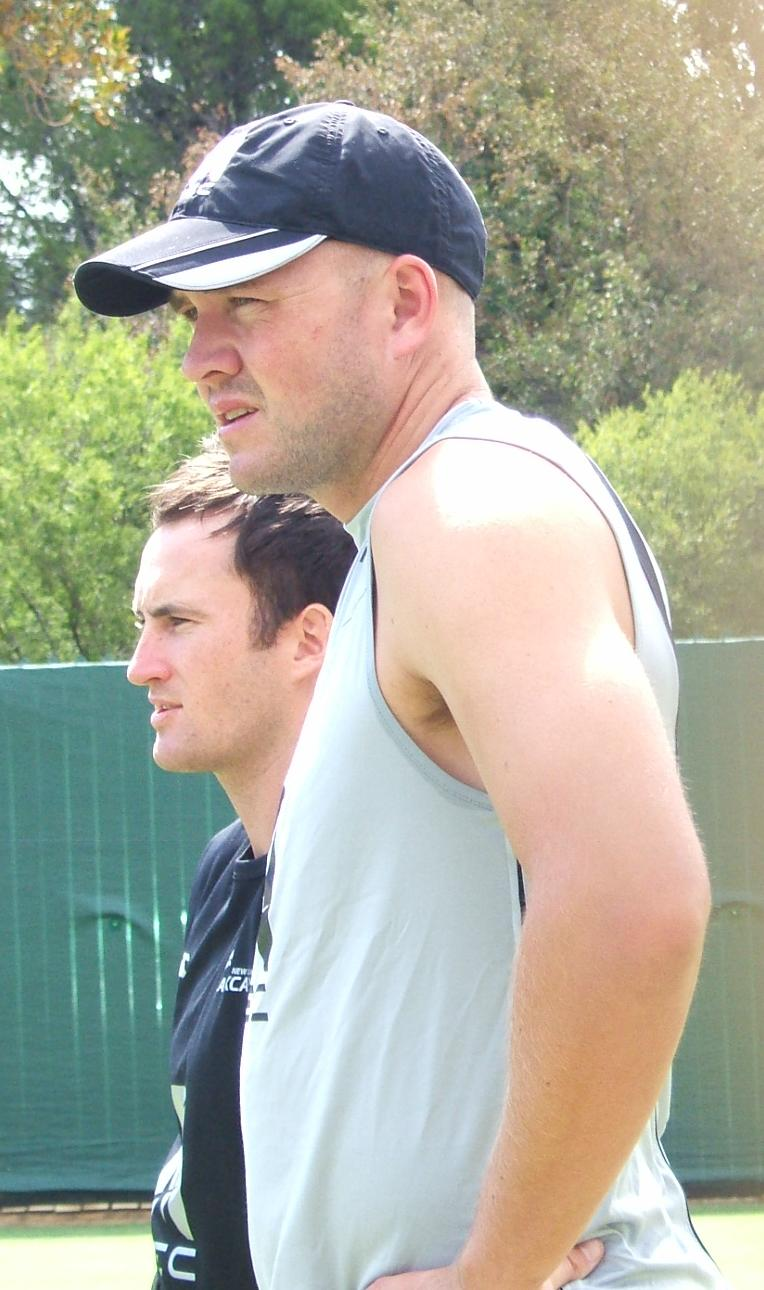

Personal information
- Full name: Peter Gordon Fulton
- Born: 1 February 1979 (age 47); Christchurch, New Zealand
- Nickname: Two-metre Peter
- Height: 1.98 m (6 ft 6 in)
- Batting: Right-handed
- Bowling: Right-arm medium
- Role: Batsman
- Relatives: Roddy Fulton (uncle)

International information
- National side: New Zealand (2004–2014)
- Test debut (cap 231): 9 March 2006 v West Indies
- Last Test: 8 June 2014 v West Indies
- ODI debut (cap 139): 2 November 2004 v Bangladesh
- Last ODI: 13 February 2009 v Australia
- ODI shirt no.: 50
- T20I debut (cap 18): 16 February 2006 v West Indies
- Last T20I: 21 December 2012 v South Africa
- T20I shirt no.: 50

Domestic team information
- Years: Team
- 2000/01–2016/17: Canterbury

Career statistics
Competition	Test	ODI	FC	LA
Matches	23	49	162	180
Runs scored	967	1,334	10,569	5,204
Batting average	25.44	32.53	39.88	34.23
100s/50s	2/5	1/8	19/60	4/38
Top score	136	112	301*	116*
Balls bowled	0	0	751	18
Wickets	–	–	11	0
Bowling average	–	–	41.36	–
5 wickets in innings	–	–	0	–
10 wickets in match	–	–	0	–
Best bowling	–	–	4/49	–
Catches/stumpings	25/–	18/–	159/–	74/–
- Source: Cricinfo, 13 January 2019

Peter Gordon Fulton (born 1 February 1979) is a former New Zealand international cricketer who played for Canterbury at domestic level. He comes from a well recognised cricketing family with his uncle Roddy Fulton playing and captaining Canterbury, Northern Districts, and New Zealand A from 1972 to 1985. He retired from first-class cricket in April 2017.

== Domestic career ==
Fulton's career highlights include scoring 301 not out against Auckland at the Hagley Oval in Christchurch over 11/12 March 2003, which is the highest maiden first-class century by any New Zealand batsman. Another career highlight was when he scored 112 in an ODI against Sri Lanka in Napier, New Zealand, on 8 January 2006. In the same series he also scored two half-centuries and was NZs top-scorer.

In the final of the 2016–17 Ford Trophy, Fulton scored the fastest century in a List A cricket match in New Zealand.

== International career ==
In March 2006, he made his Test debut against the West Indies.

In March 2013 he made his first International Test century playing against England, and scored his second Test hundred in the match's second innings. In doing so he became the fourth New Zealander to score a hundred in both innings of a Test match.

On 13 February 2026 he was appointed coach of Middlesex County Cricket Club.
