= Harold Monaghan =

New Zealand cricketer and clergyman (1886–1958)

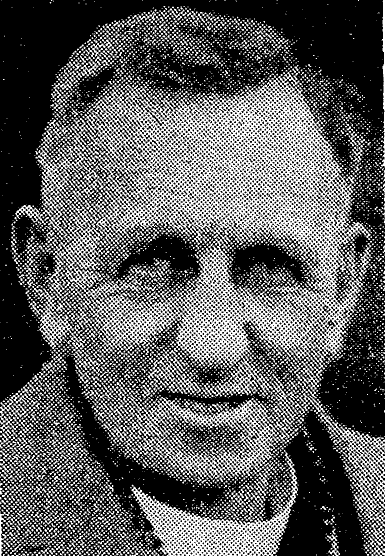

Personal information
- Full name: Harold Wyatt Monaghan
- Born: 7 October 1886; Karori, Wellington, New Zealand
- Died: 15 October 1958 (aged 72); Levin, New Zealand
- Batting: Left-handed
- Bowling: Right-arm medium-pace

Domestic team information
- Years: Team
- 1905–06 to 1910–11: Wellington
- 1913–14: Canterbury

Career statistics
Competition	First-class
Matches	15
Runs scored	354
Batting average	18.63
100s/50s	0/0
Top score	47*
Balls bowled	2,765
Wickets	59
Bowling average	20.49
5 wickets in innings	2
10 wickets in match	0
Best bowling	7/50
Catches/stumpings	7/–
- Source: Cricket Archive, 1 September 2014

Harold Wyatt Monaghan (7 October 1886 – 15 October 1958) was a New Zealand first-class cricketer and a clergyman in the Anglican Church.

== Cricket career ==
Monaghan made his first-class debut for Wellington in 1905–06, when in two matches he took 14 wickets at an average of 9.71, including 5 for 42 and 4 for 53 in his second match against Auckland, when he opened the bowling with Ernest Upham. He took 7 for 95 when Wellington played Melbourne Cricket Club later in the season, and was selected to play for New Zealand later in the same tour, but took only one wicket, that of Warwick Armstrong. Both matches were non-first-class. In March 1906 "Long Slip", the cricket writer of the Otago Witness, wrote: "Monaghan is now probably the best bowler in New Zealand, his swerve being a decided and puzzling one."

His 1906–07 season consisted of two matches for Wellington against the touring MCC. In the first match he took 7 for 50 in the first innings. He continued to play for Wellington until 1910–11.

Monaghan moved to Canterbury for the 1913–14 season, forming an opening-bowling partnership with George Wilson that enabled Canterbury to win all four of their Plunket Shield matches. Monaghan took 14 wickets at 17.92 in the Shield. In the match against Auckland he scored 46 and 39, taking part in two batting partnerships with Wilson of 83 (for the tenth wicket) and 59 (for the ninth), as well as taking 2 for 46 and 3 for 73.

The former New Zealand captain Thomas Cobcroft thought that, apart from the Australian Tom McKibbin, Monaghan was the most difficult bowler he ever faced: "just as you had made your stroke to drive him, his ball would swing and drop suddenly. A great pity for New Zealand cricket that this promising bowler went out of the game so early." Monaghan was 27 when he played his last first-class match. He badly fractured his right arm in 1915 and played little cricket of any sort thereafter, and then mostly as a batsman.

== Clerical career and personal life ==
Monaghan was educated at Wellington College, where he was head prefect in 1904, and at Victoria University, where he was awarded the degree of Master of Arts (with "second-class honours in mental science") in 1910. He was ordained a deacon in Christchurch in 1913, and a priest in 1914.

He was a vicar at Richmond in Christchurch, in Ross on the West Coast, in Pahiatua in the Wairarapa, and was later Archdeacon of Timaru and of Rangitikei.

Monaghan wrote four books:

- The Wicket Gate: A Sunday School Manual (1931, reprinted 1959)
- Christ in You: A Manual for Communicants (1932, reprinted several times)
- A Joy for Ever: St. Mary's Parish Church, Timaru (1945)
- From Age to Age: The Story of the Church of England in the Diocese of Wellington, 1858–1958 (1957)

Monaghan married Jessie Butler in Wellington in October 1913. They had five children. Their sons David, also a cricketer, and Gerald died on active service in World War II. He died at his home in Levin in October 1958, aged 72, survived by his widow, two daughters and a son.
