= Cass, New Zealand =

Human settlement in Selwyn District, Canterbury Region, New Zealand

Cass
- Locality
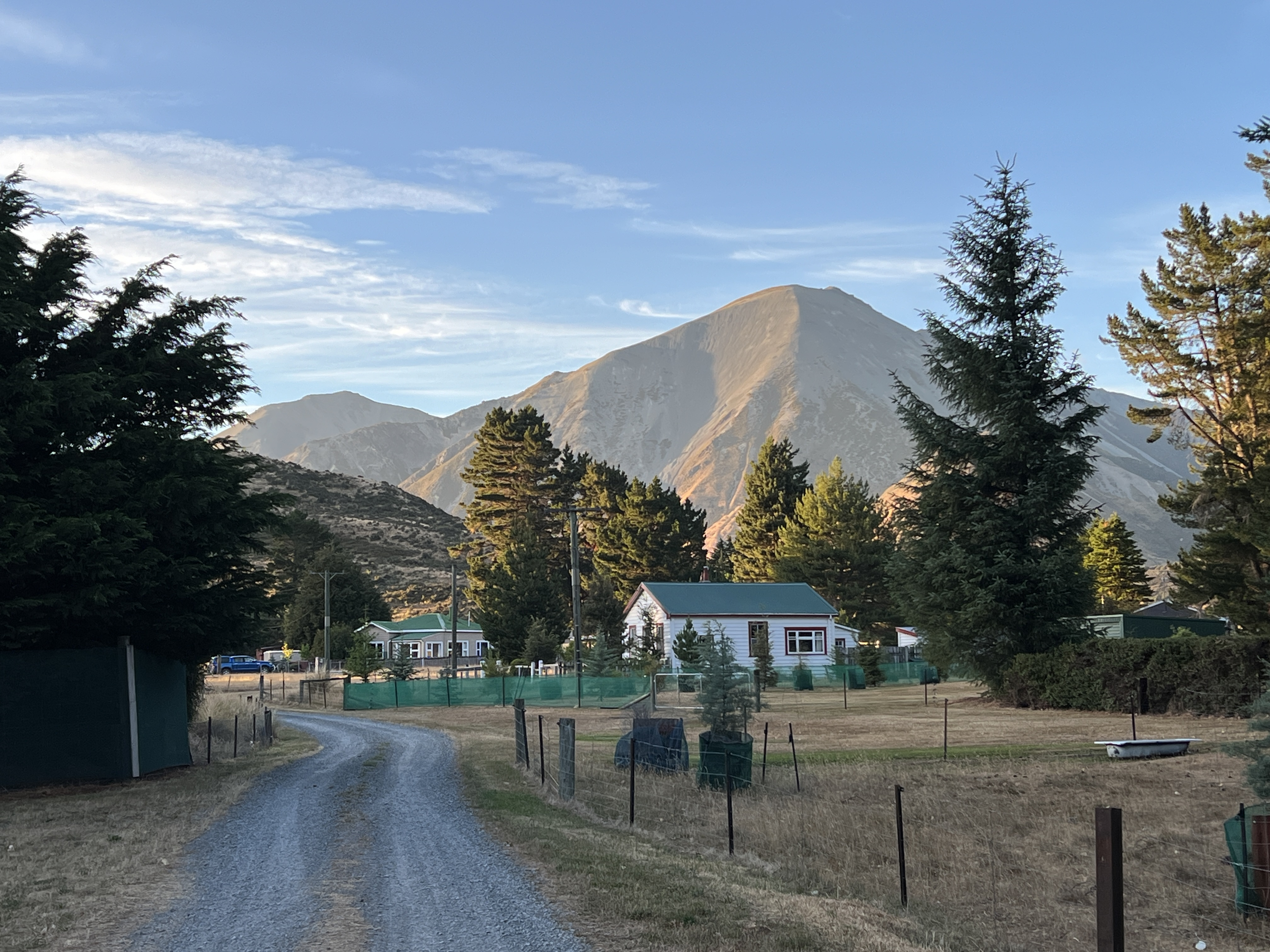
- Cass with Baldy Hill to the south
- Interactive map of Cass
- Coordinates: 43°01′51″S 171°45′30″E
- Country: New Zealand
- Region: Canterbury
- Territorial authority: Selwyn District

Government
  - Territorial authority: Selwyn District Council
  - Regional council: Environment Canterbury
- Elevation: 600 m (2,000 ft)
- Time zone: UTC+12 (New Zealand Standard Time)
  - Summer (DST): UTC+13 (New Zealand Daylight Time)
- Postcode: 7580
- Area code: 03
- Local iwi: Ngāi Tahu

Cass is a small locality in inland Canterbury on New Zealand's South Island, near Arthur's Pass. It is known for its small railway station which was the subject of the 1936 painting Cass by Rita Angus, voted in 2006 New Zealand's favourite work of art. It is also the location of a University of Canterbury field station established in 1914. Cass currently has a single permanent resident.

== Geography ==
Cass is in the Cass River basin, which is in turn in the Waimakariri River basin in western Canterbury, Selwyn District, of the South Island. It is 22 km from Arthur's Pass, and 105 km from Christchurch via State Highway 73 and the Midland Line.

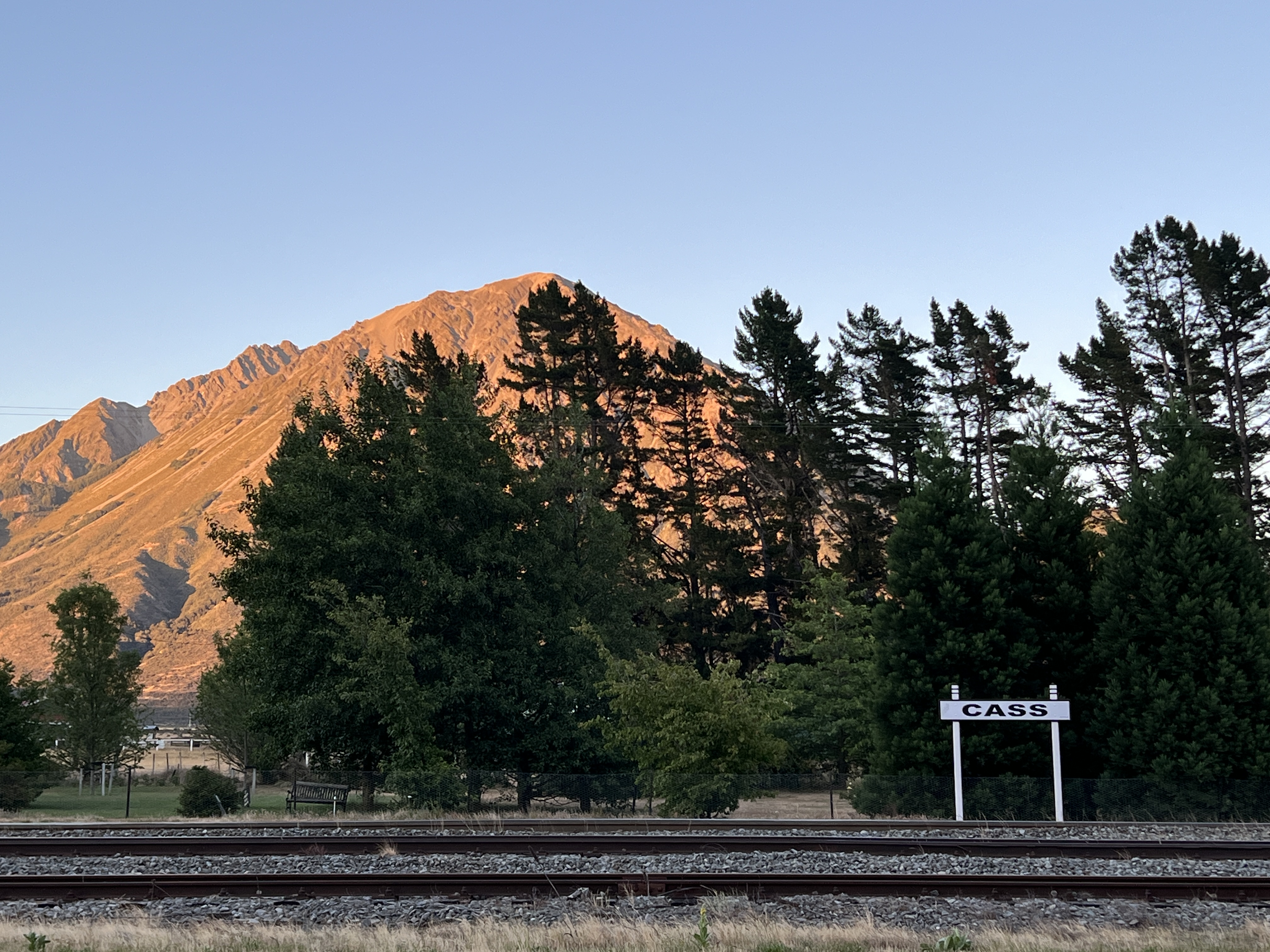
Mount Misery from Cass Station

The settlement is on a plain surrounded by mountains 1200–1800 m above sea level, predominantly in the Black Range, Polar Range, and Craigieburn Range. To the east of the settlement is Cass Hill and Sugar Loaf, and to the west are Mount Misery and Mount Horrible; two hills on the floodplain are named Romulus and Remus.

The topography of the Cass area was formed by repeated glaciation in the Pleistocene, with the valley floor built up by river fans as the glaciers retreated and the nearby Lakes Sarah and Grasmere enclosed by moraines and ice-eroded rocks. Many of the valleys around Cass post-date the retreat of the Poulter Glacier 13,000 years ago, and are caused by erosion.

== History ==
The Ōtira Gorge route was used by Māori travelling from Canterbury to Westland, and there are traces of forest fires and moa hunting in the area approximately 600 years ago. Travellers would have relied on the lakes in the Cass area for their eels and waterfowl.

After the prime grazing land on the Canterbury Plains had been settled by European colonists, settlers looked for open country in increasingly-remote mountain valleys. Joseph Pearson and W. Sidebottom was the first Pākehā to investigate the area, in October 1857. Merino sheep runs soon followed, with stations set up at Castle Hill, Grasmere, Mount White, Craigieburn (now Flock Hill), and Riversdale by 1860. Joseph Dawson arrived from Australia in 1860 and farmed at Grasmere Station, building a two-room cob cottage which is incorporated in to the current Grasmere Lodge luxury accommodation. Cass, always known in the early sheep-farming days as "The Cass", was named after Thomas Cass, Chief Surveyor of Canterbury from 1851 to 1867.

By 1865 a road and telegraph line had been constructed through Cass as far as the Bealey River, and the Cobb & Co. coach line was running a twice-weekly passenger and mail service to the Bealey Accommodation House, and by 1866 to the gold fields of Hokitika. In 1866 4,000 sheep and 25,000 cattle were driven over the Pass to feed gold-miners, with Cora Lynn station in Cass used as a holding area and oats grown to feed coach horses.

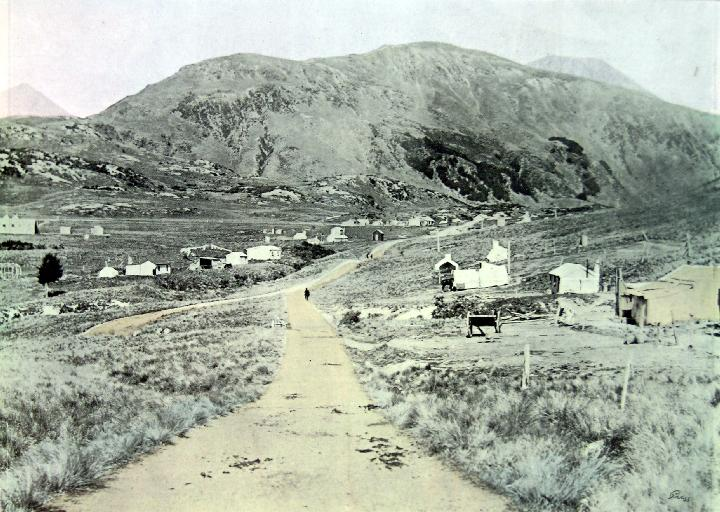
Cass in 1911, when it was the terminus for the Midland Line

The coach route led to the construction of stables, a hotel, a police post, and a Road Board office (which later contained the Upper Waimakariri Book Library). In the late 19th century there was an annual race meeting on Cass Flats, followed by a dance at the Road Board office. In 1873 what was then Canterbury College was granted over 64,000 acres of land in the area as an endowment, which it then leased out to runholders at Craigieburn, Flock Hill, and Avoca on 21-year terms. Wool was hauled to Christchurch by horse-drawn wagon until the early 1900s, when traction engines were used until the railway arrived.

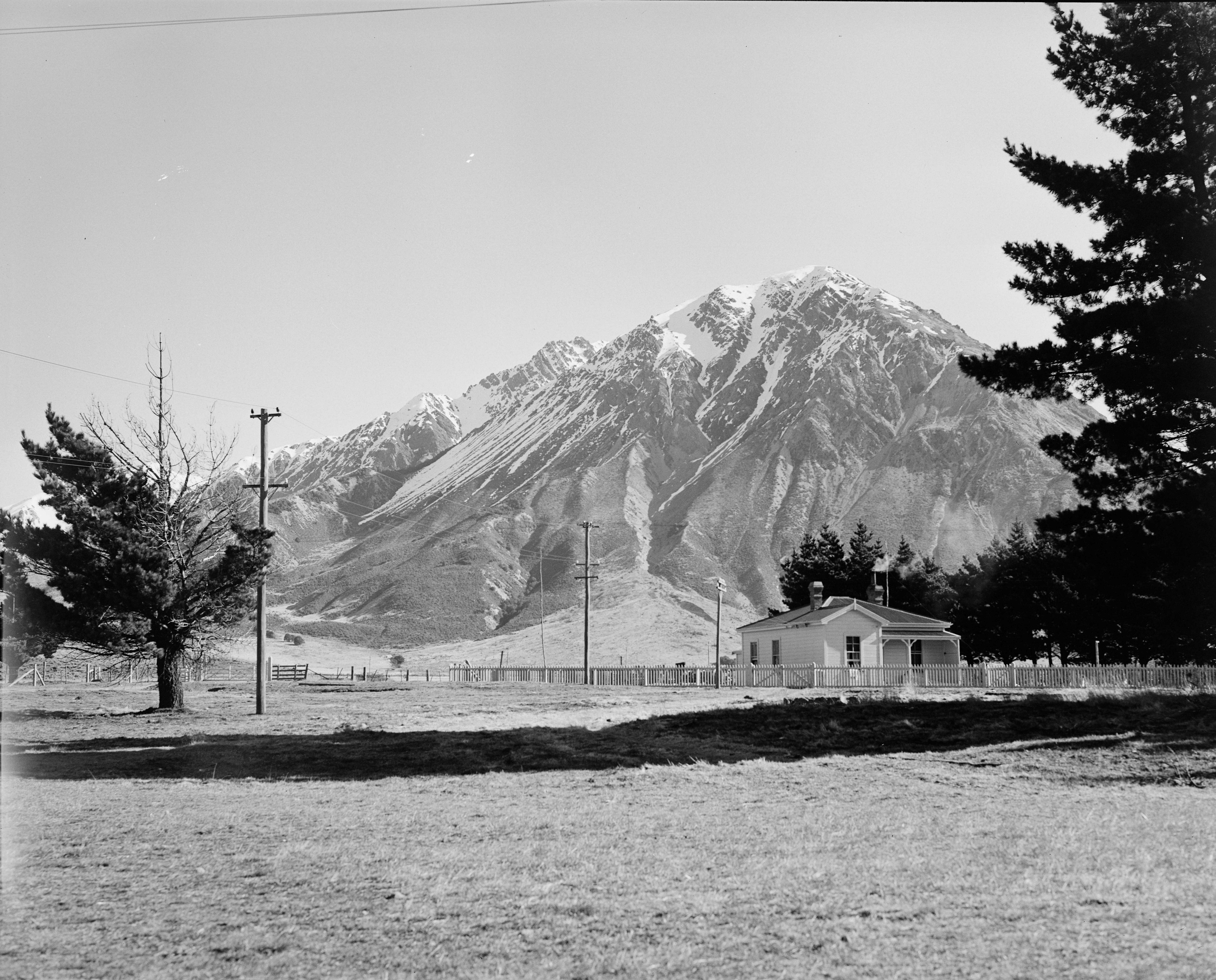
Cass in 1952, Mount Horrible in the distance

The laying of the Midland Line between Christchurch and the West Coast led to the building of an 800-man construction camp at Cass in December 1910, the then-railhead of the railway line and the start of the coach road. The township was in its heyday, with three stores, a drapers, blacksmith, dining room, butcher, police station and school. In July 1914 the railway station and much of the population was moved to Bealey Flat and then Arthur's Pass, and Cass became a flag station.

The settlement was connected by rail to the West Coast when the Otira Tunnel was completed in 1923. A train continued to stop at Cass twice daily, but since November 1987 the only passenger service has been the tourist-oriented TranzAlpine, which does not routinely stop there.

== Population ==
As of 2024 Cass had just one resident: Barrie Drummond, a railway worker who moved there around age 40 and spent over 25 years subsequently as an employee of KiwiRail, performing switching and track maintenance. Cass is thus one of the few places in the world with a population of one resident. There is a single dwelling, claimed to be the last KiwiRail-owned house in New Zealand, and several holiday homes.

Drummond is also the organiser of the annual "Cass Bash", a weekend cricket match each November between locals and representatives of Kiwirail that attracts around 250 visitors. One railway shed has been turned into a bar and music stage for the event. Drummond has also built a miniature golf course and bowling green in the settlement.

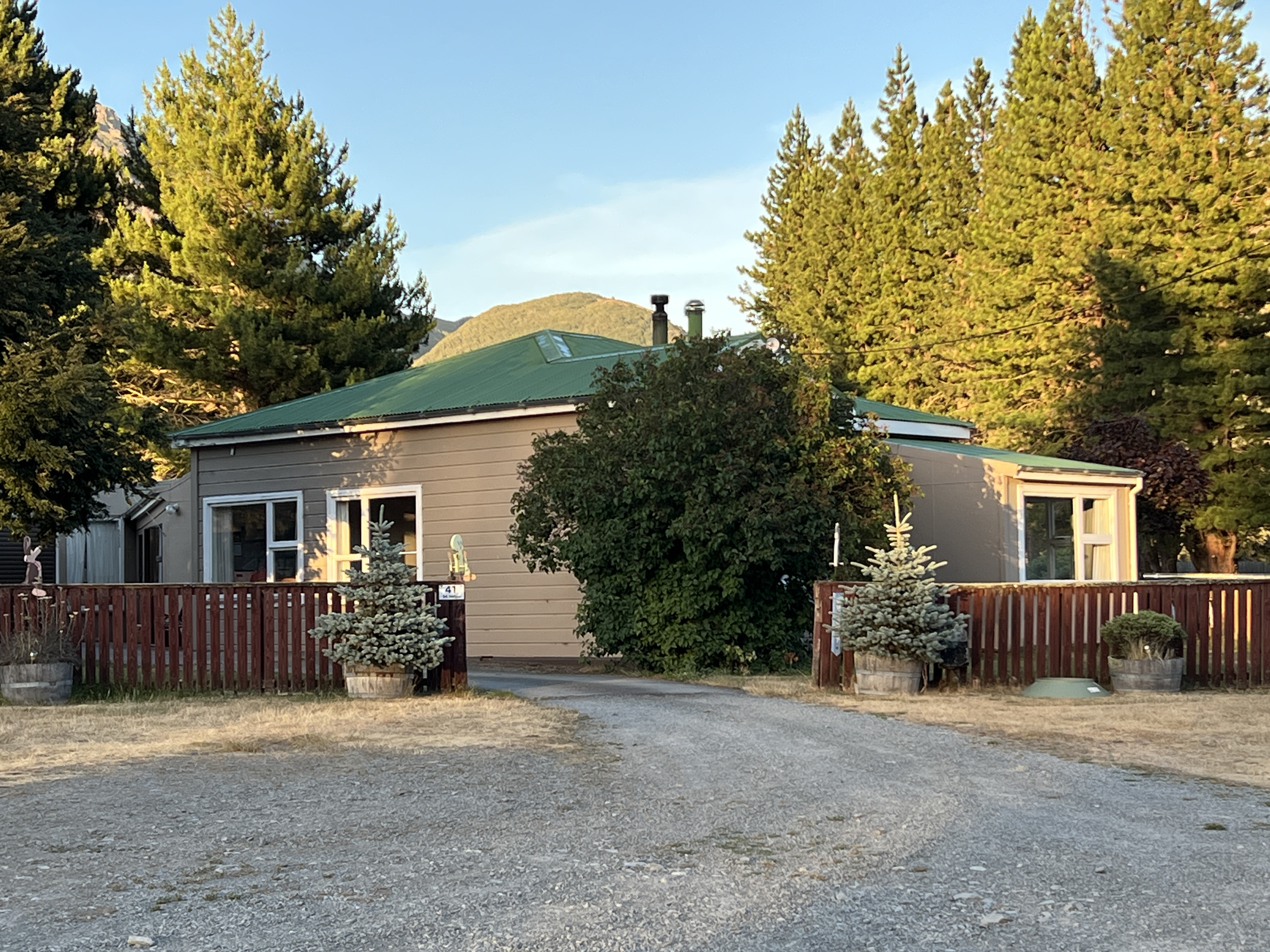
Cass's sole dwelling

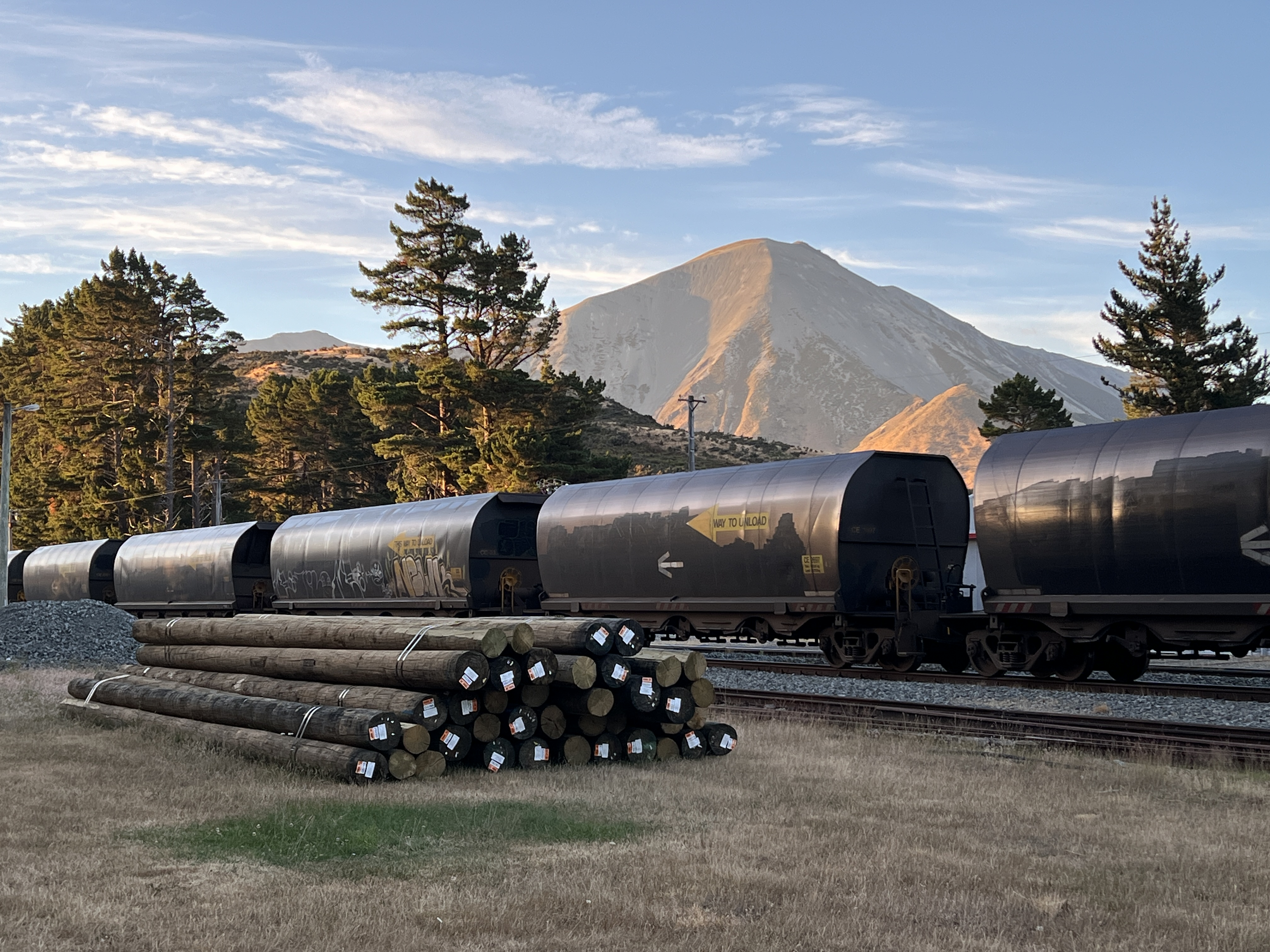
Midland Line station

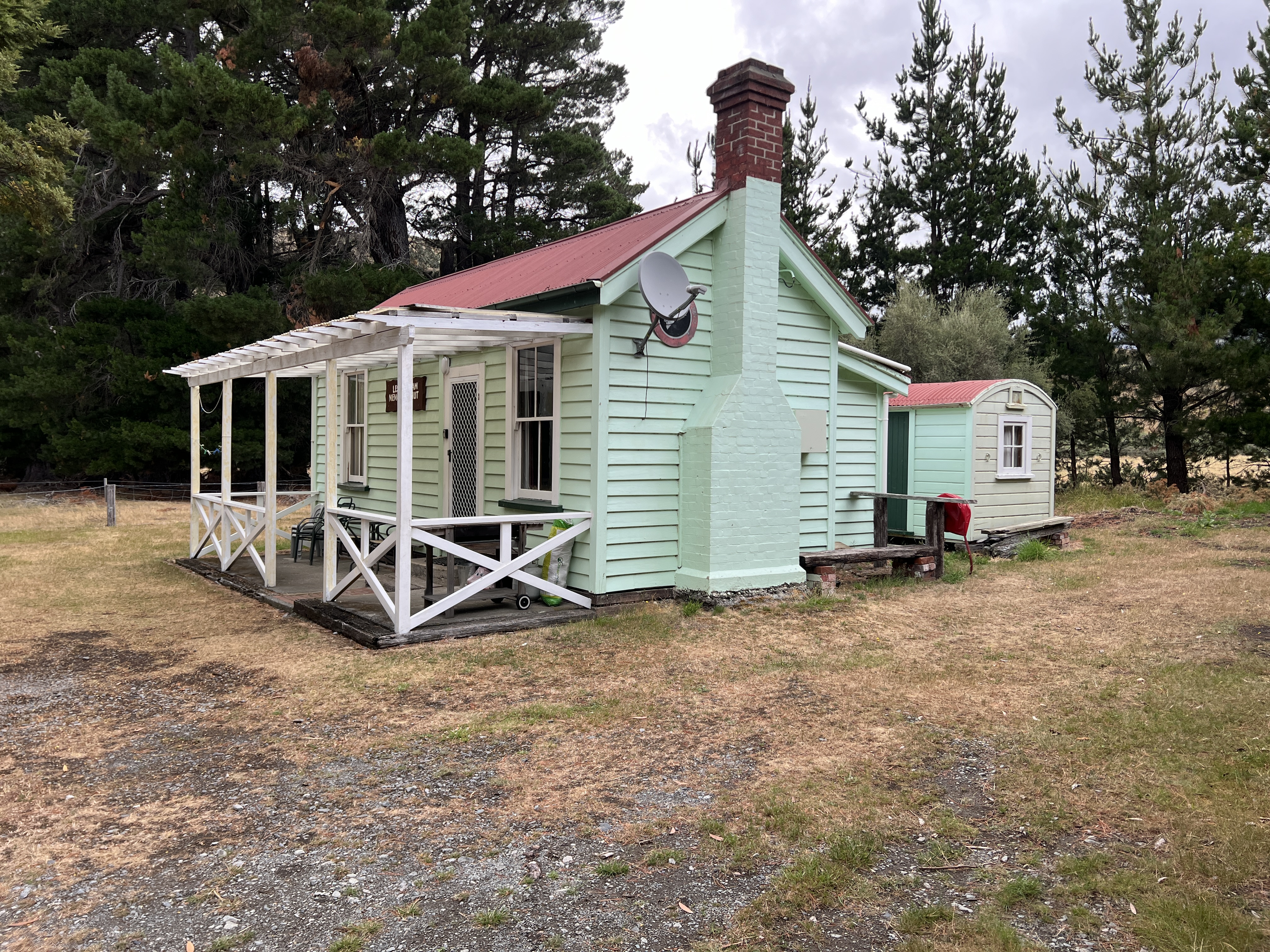
Les Moxham memorial lodge

== Field station ==
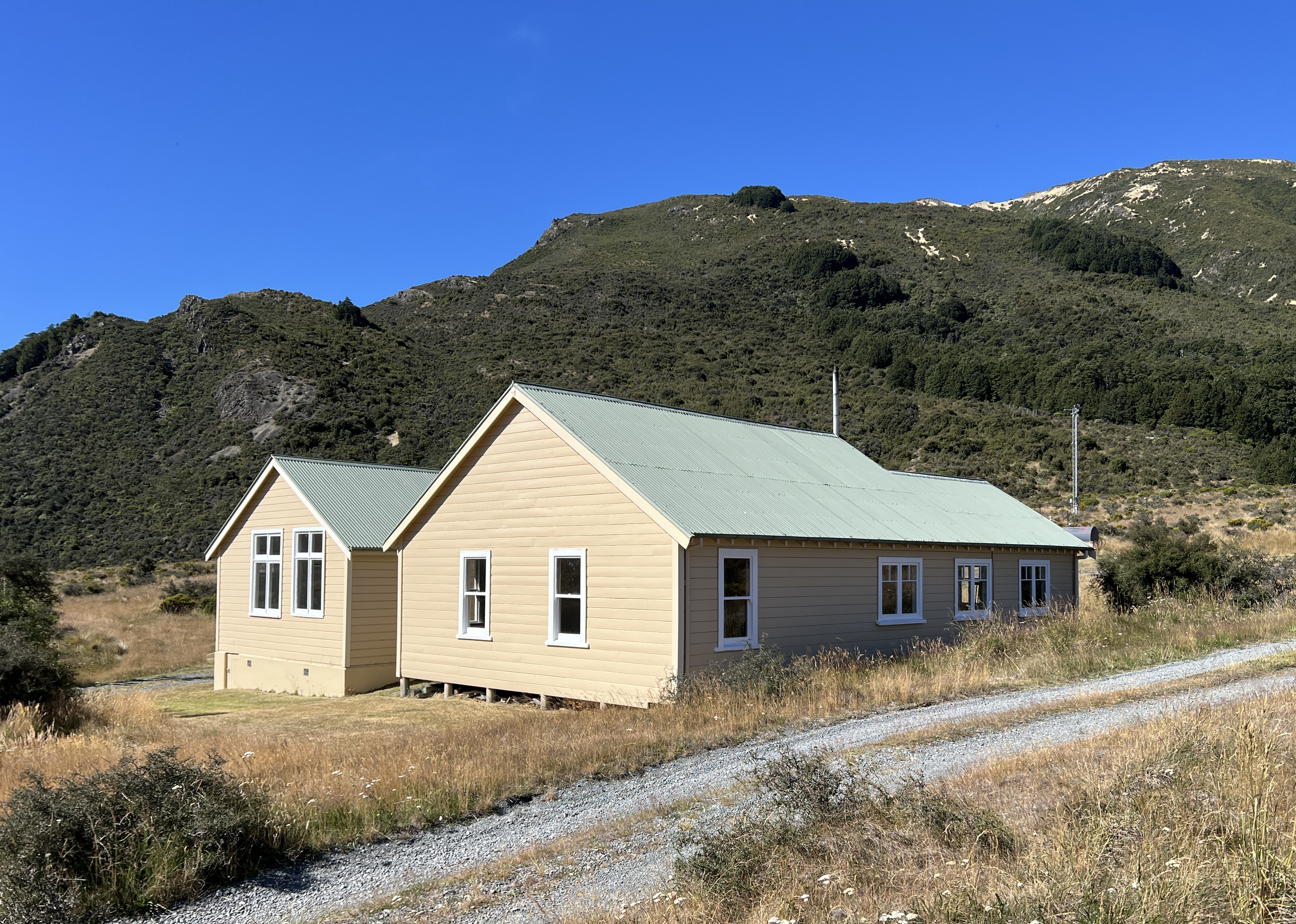
Original 1914 building and 1959 extension

The University of Canterbury has a field station at Cass, commonly used for undergraduate field trips and research. The station was originally planned for Broken River, but the construction of the camp at the terminus of the Midland Line led to it being built at Cass, and the Mountain Biological Station opened in March 1914. The initial building contained a living room and bunkrooms but no laboratory. In 1929 the building was extended, adding a laboratory, a coal stove, hot water and a bathroom. An additional building was added in 1959.

The field station was used for student field trips, and as a base for conducting research on tussock burning, sheep grazing, entomology, glaciology, climate, and in later years freshwater ecology and plant systematics. Charles E. Foweraker undertook the first Honours research project there, and his 1915 photographs of the area are valuable sources of information for vegetation change over the succeeding century. Other important photographs of the field station were taken by Ellen Heine and are held at the National Museum of New Zealand Te Papa Tongarewa.

Over 1975–77 a new building called the Teaching Flat was constructed next to the original field station, which was refurbished with teaching spaces and lab and research facilities. The University of Canterbury celebrated 100 years of teaching and research at Cass Field Station on 2–6 December 2014.

== Rita Angus's Cass ==
Cass (1936) by Rita Angus

In May 1936 Christchurch artist Rita Angus took the three-hour train journey to Cass, accompanied by painters Louise Henderson and Julia Scarvell. The trio stayed for ten days at the Biological Station, sketching the surrounding landscape. Angus and Henderson both painted the small railway station. The resulting painting by Angus, titled Cass, has been described as "one of the defining works of the 1930s and indeed of New Zealand art history." It was voted New Zealand's greatest painting in a 2006 poll on the Television New Zealand arts programme Frontseat.

The station depicted in Cass is a simple two-room building constructed in 1911 with weatherboard sides and a corrugated iron roof. At the time Angus painted it a larger building and a refreshments room had been removed, but a goods shed was still present. The station still stands today. By the 1980s it had been painted white (the colour depicted in Julian Dashper's photograph), but in the late 1990s it was repainted a uniform ochre red (possibly to more closely resemble the Angus painting), a colour used by museums to paint Māori carvings, known as "Museum Red"). In the early 2020s it was repainted again, to tan with red trim. The settlement has over 1000 visitors a year stopping off to see and photograph the famous railway station.

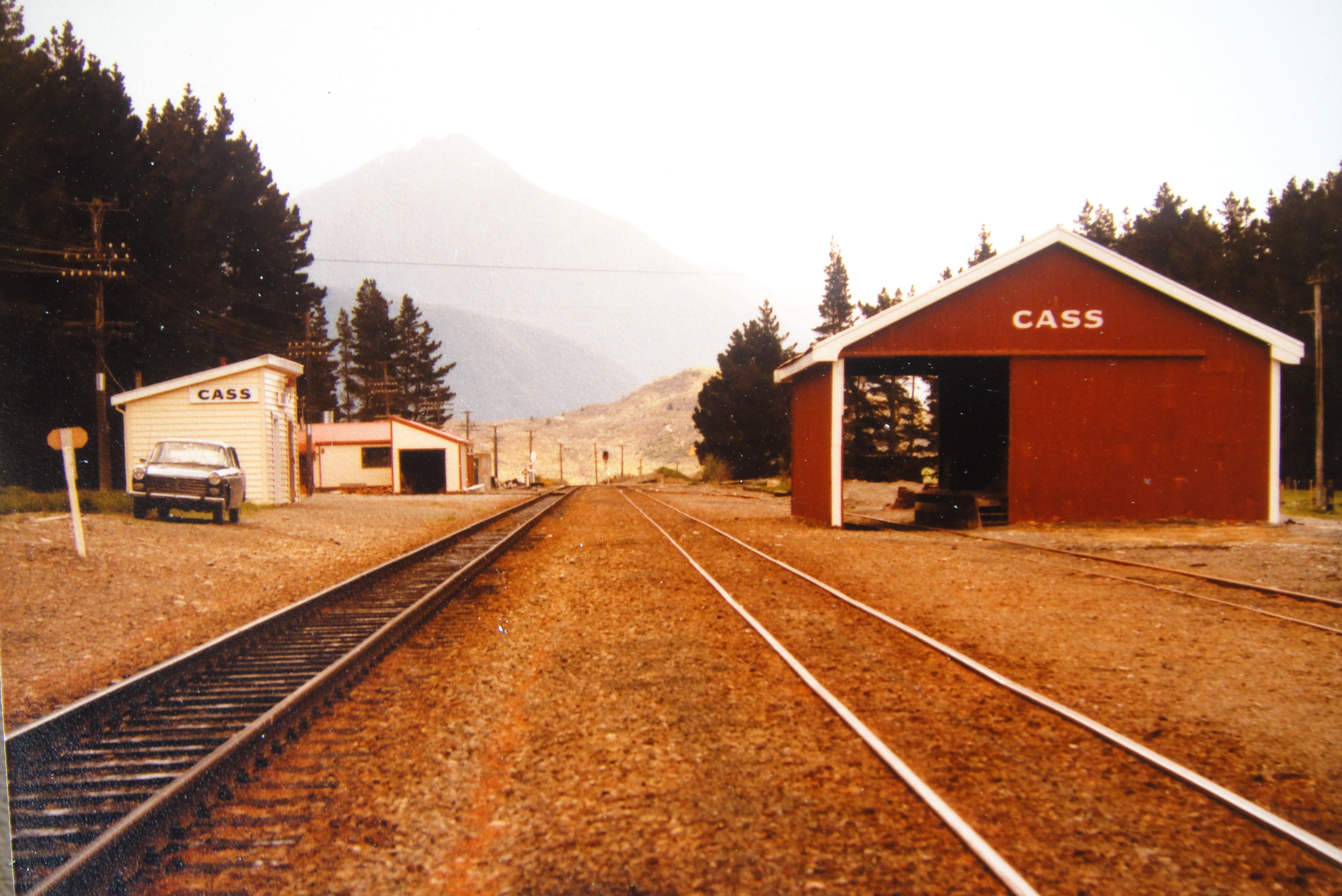
1984

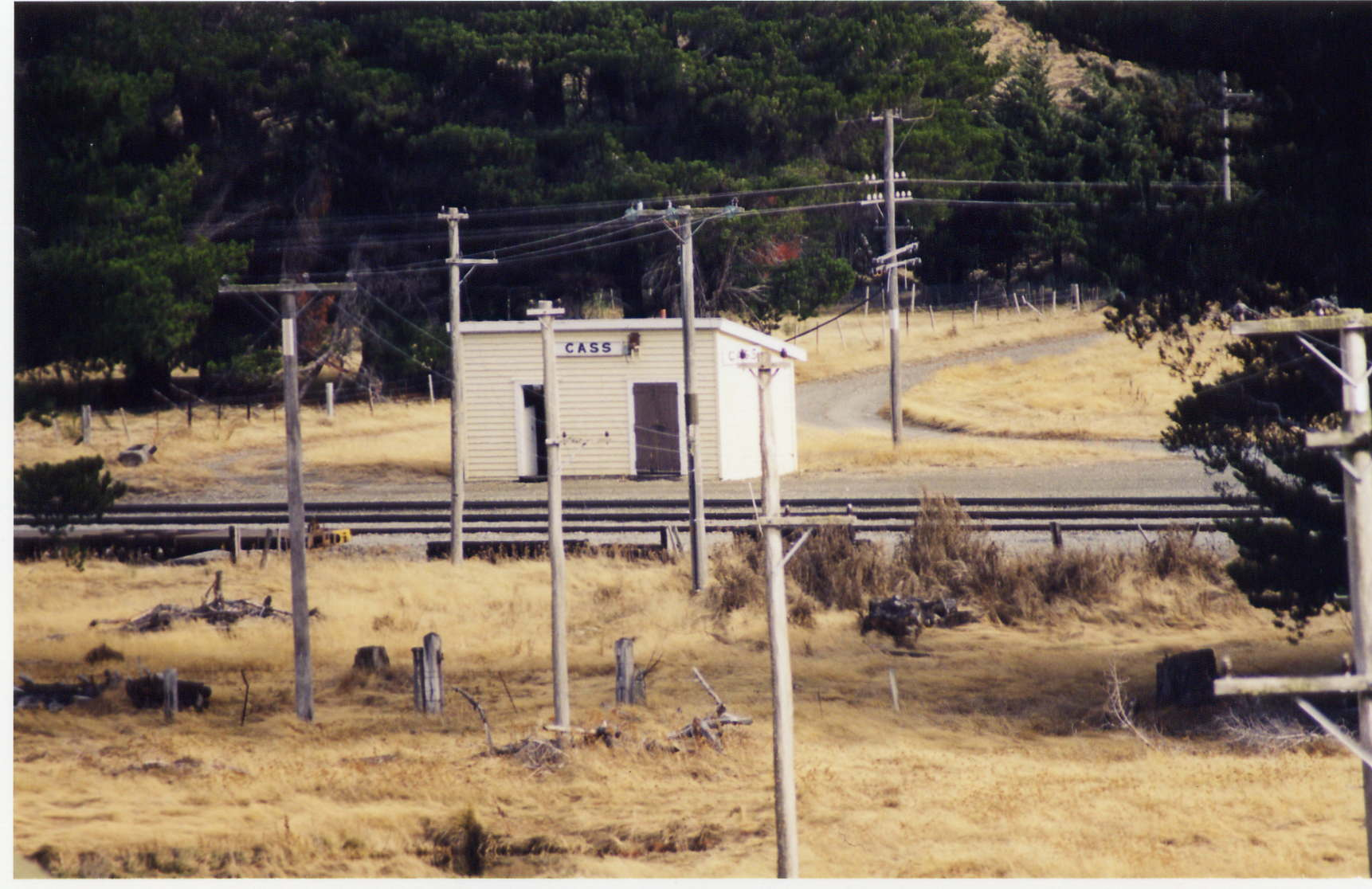
circa 1999

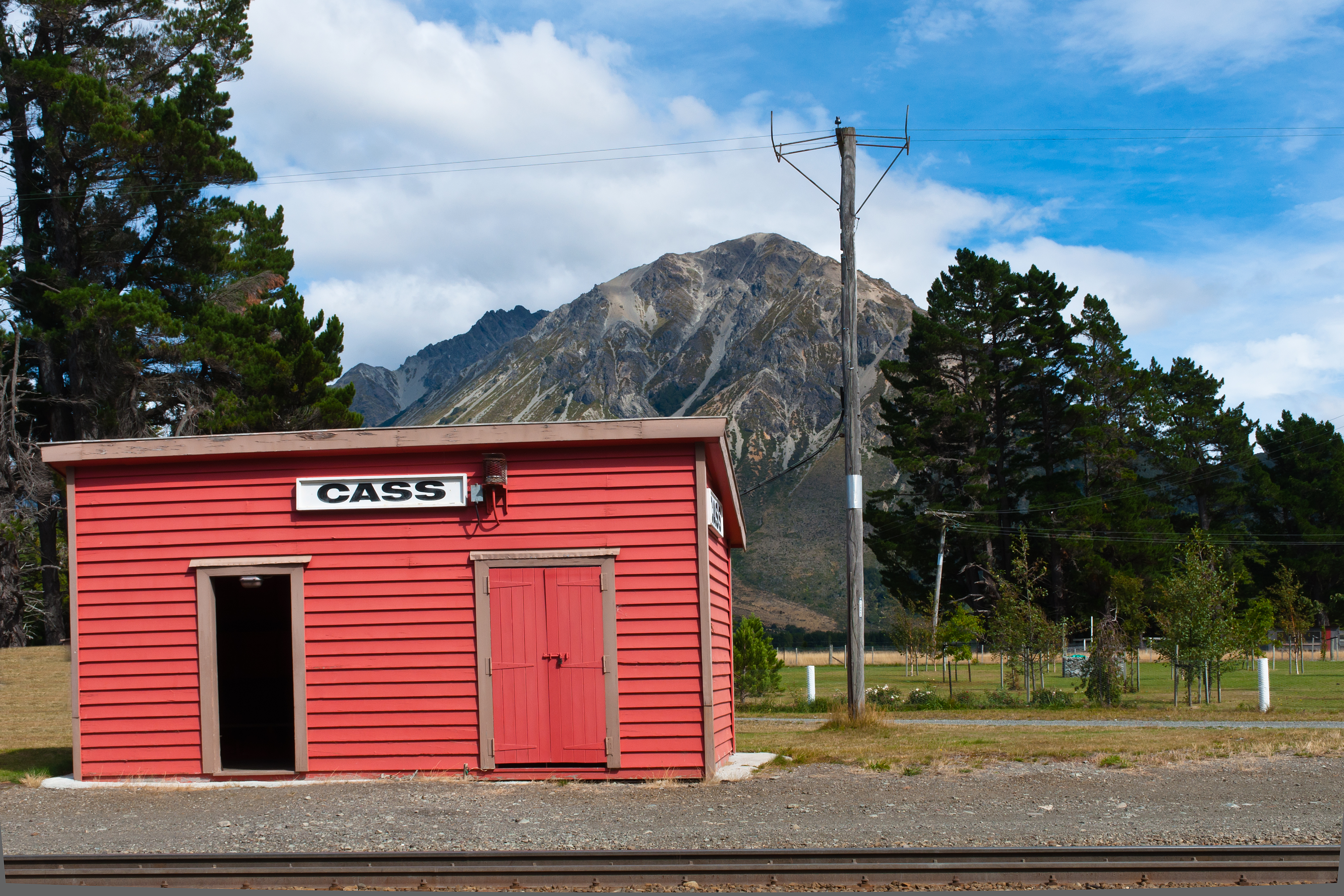
2016

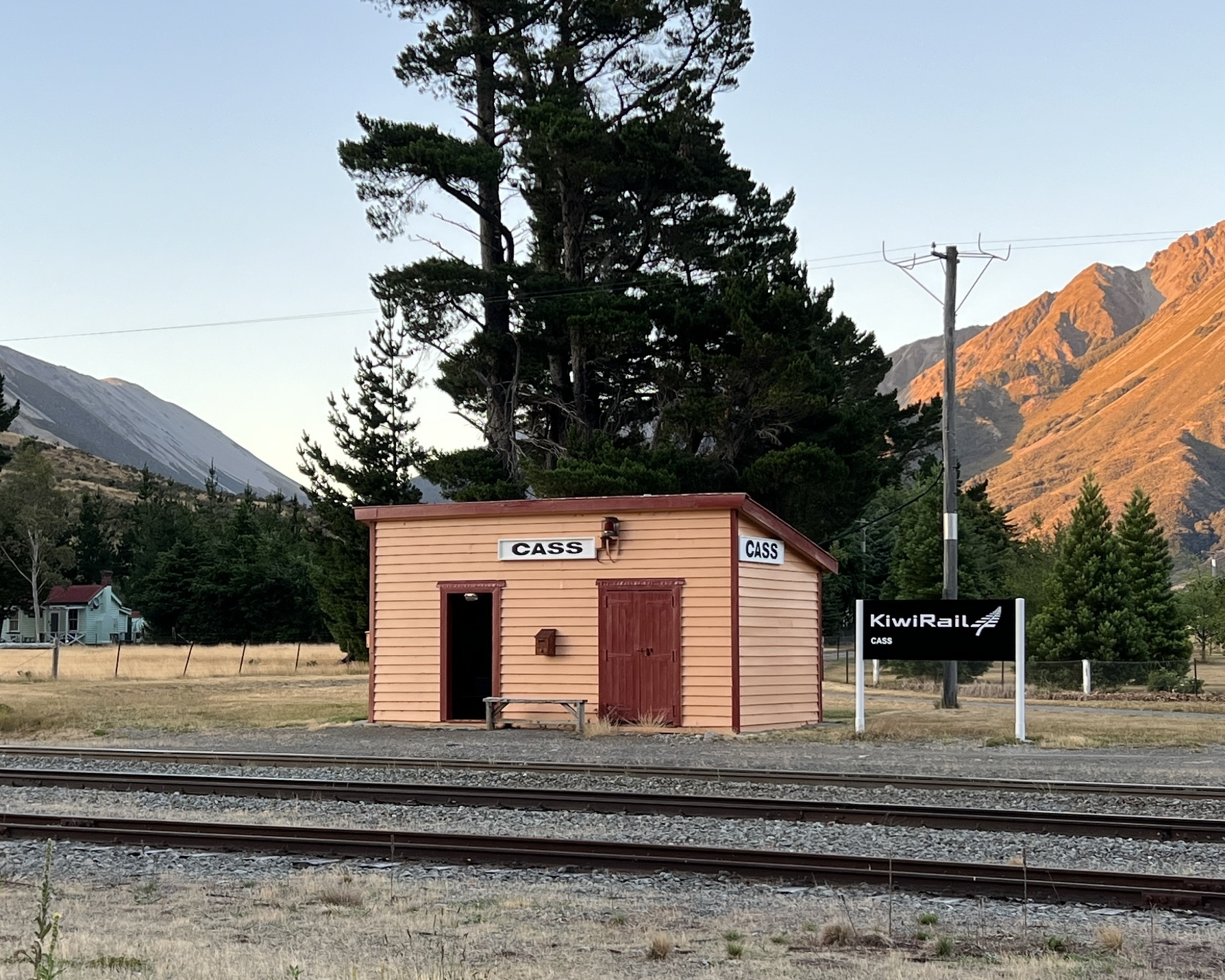
2024
