= Rata Lovell-Smith =

New Zealand artist

Rata Alice Lovell-Smith
- Born: Rata Alice Bird; 24 December 1894; Christchurch
- Died: 28 September 1969 (aged 74); Christchurch
- Education: Christchurch College School of Art
- Known for: Painting
- Spouse: Colin Stuart Lovell-Smith

Rata Alice Lovell-Smith (née Bird, 1894–1969) was a New Zealand artist who was recognised as one of the first to break with the realist traditions of British art and work toward a style distinctive to New Zealand.

== Early years ==
Lovell-Smith was born on 24 December 1894 in Christchurch. She was the eldest daughter of Alfred Louis Bird, an engineer, and his wife Alice Emily Cox. After attending Christchurch Girls’ High she studied drawing at the Canterbury College School of Art part-time while working as a primary school teacher. She was awarded her teaching certificate in 1912 and in 1917 she returned to the Canterbury College School of Art to study part-time with Leonard Booth and Richard Wallwork. In 1919 she received a first-class pass in Drawing from Life along with a scholarship. During this period she studied alongside artists who went on to become well known in the search for a distinctive New Zealand identity. They included Eve Poulson (Evelyn Page), Ngaio Marsh, Rhona Haszard, Rita Angus and Russell Clark. In February 1922 Rata Alice Bird married fellow artist Colin Stuart Lovell-Smith who was teaching at the Canterbury College School of Art. She graduated with a Diploma of Fine Arts the next year and from 1926 she also taught there, initially part time, until 1945. The Lovell-Smiths had two sons, Richard and John. Richard went on to become an artist and taught at the Art School in Christchurch. In 1949 Lovell-Smith was one of the founding members of the Christchurch Soroptimist Club, an internationally based, female driven organisation that promoted human rights and quality of life for women and girls. She went on to convene its classification committee for many years and served as its vice president.

== Painting career ==
Lovell-Smith's paintings were generally of landscapes, botany, and flowers. She always painted in situ and never painted from notes. Sometimes, she would have several paintings on the go from the same location, each with different weather. From 1921 Lovell-Smith was a working member of the Canterbury Society of Arts and exhibited regularly. From the 1920s she also exhibited widely throughout New Zealand as can be seen from this selective listing:

1921 Otago Art Society Annual Exhibition The Otago Daily Times critic commented on one of her portraits of a young child that, ‘The expression upon the little girl's face is almost startling in its wistfulness in which there is more than a suggestion of wondering apprehension.’

1922 New Zealand Academy of Fine Arts in Wellington.

1927 Otago Art Society Annual Exhibition.

1927 Auckland Art Society Annual Exhibition. Lovell-Smith was particularly praised by art critic Eric Ramsden. ‘Rata Lovell-Smith is a talented painter, whose “Berthe,” a demure maid in a Dutch cap, is an exceedingly fine piece of work. It will bear repeated inspection.’

She was also invited to show her work outside New Zealand and was included in the 1924 British Empire Exhibition held in Wembly, London.

By the 1930s Lovell-Smith’s painting had become distinctly modern in style and was recognised alongside that of her fellow painter Rita Angus as a sign of the emergence of a distinctive New Zealand style. In the late 1920s there was some criticism of Lovell-Smith’s painting being ‘too posterish’. The Otago Daily Times critic went so far as to comment, ‘This type of work, if well done, for commercial purposes is not only excusable but highly commendable. But for the purposes of fine art it is inexcusable.’ By the early 1930s attitudes had shifted and the Dominion newspaper's art critic wrote of her ‘wide departure from realism’ and commented that her work, ‘commanded attention’ because ‘Such pictures suggest that the artist uses a landscape theme to build up her own designs rather than to record things seen.’ Other critics referred to this style as ‘modernist simplification.’ Lovell-Smith can be understood as part of a movement of New Zealand artists in the 1930s, including Olivia Spencer-Bower, Rita Angus, and brothers James and Alfred Cook, whom art writers A.R.D Fairburn, James Shelley and '"Conrad" recognised as providing a "new manner" of painting better representing New Zealand and its light. This included the removal of romantic or golden mist and soft warm colour, and a move towards clear hard light, and displaying sheer, sharp, more linear forms. Lovell-Smith's emerging style was exemplified by the painting Hawkins (1933). It depicted a deserted railway station near Darfield in the South Island and went on to influence painters like W A Sutton and Rita Angus. Three years later Angus painted her own version of a country railway station in Cass. Sculptor and art school lecturer Francis Shurrock said of Lovell-Smith at the time, ‘she has shown us how, in art at least, to free ourselves from the vast weight of the English tradition: how to be post-colonial.’ Penelope Jackson has written of Hawkins, ‘Lovell-Smith's brave new stylistic treatment used in this work broke with the old European realist traditions common to New Zealand painting. It was not an easy transition at the time…’

In 1933 the New Zealand Society of Arts was launched with Lovell-Smith as one of its founding members. She was also included in the first exhibition. At its opening event Professor James Shelley claimed the work was, ‘the most stimulating he had seen since his arrival in Christchurch 13 or 14 years before,’ and added that, ‘as far as stimulus was concerned he was sure that it was equal to, if not finer than, anything he had seen.’ The Society of Arts was only active for a couple of years before it merged with The Group. From 1935 she regularly exhibited with The Group (with Cora Wilding, Ngaio Marsh, Evelyn Page, and Louise Henderson).

In 1939 Lovell-Smith was awarded the Bledisloe Medal for Landscapes for her Punga by the Auckland Society of Art. and the following year her painting The Top of the Pass (1937) was included in the New Zealand Art exhibition which was part of the New Zealand Centennial celebrations. Although artists like Lovell-Smith were seen by some commentators like Professor Shelley as showing a new way of looking at New Zealand, the general opinion remained closer to the views of A H McLintock, the curator of the Centennial Exhibition. He claimed in his catalogue essay that, ‘…New Zealand is far from possessing an art truly national…’ He did, however, go on to comment, ‘The interesting and praiseworthy efforts of young New Zealanders to interpret the characteristics of their country without undue reliance upon European styles and methods are slowly but unmistakably influencing the development of painting throughout the Dominion.’ After the Second World War the Lovell-Smiths were able to travel to England and Europe on a short study tour. On their return Lovell-Smith showed the paintings she had done in Europe in the 1951 Canterbury Society of Arts exhibition the same year she was selected for the Women's International Art Club Festival of Britain exhibition. Lovell-Smith continued to paint in the next decade and made a number of Australian landscapes while visiting Queensland in 1961 and 1963. She died in 1969.

== Collections ==
Auckland Art GalleryToi o Tāmaki

Christchurch Art Gallery

Dunedin Public Art Gallery

Fletcher Art Collection

Sarjeant Gallery, Whanganui

Te Manawa

Te Papa Tongarewa
