= Cass (painting) =

Painting by Rita Angus

- Artist: Rita Angus
- Year: 1936
- Medium: oil on canvas on board
- Subject: Cass, New Zealand
- Dimensions: 550 mm × 650 mm (22 in × 26 in)
- Location: Christchurch Art Gallery
- Accession: 69/74

Cass is an oil painting created by the New Zealand artist Rita Angus in 1936, depicting the railway station at the small mountain settlement of Cass in the Canterbury high country. It has been described as "one of the defining works of the 1930s and indeed of New Zealand art history," and was voted "New Zealand's greatest painting" in a 2006 television poll.

== Creation ==
In the mid-1930s Rita Angus was in her 20s and working as a freelance commercial artist, writing and illustrating stories in the Press Junior supplement, from a small studio in Christchurch's Chancery Lane. She was part of a network of independent women working in the arts, including Olivia Spencer Bower, Louise Henderson, cellist Valmai Moffett, and her friend Jean Stevenson, editor of the Press Junior. Around this time she was taking regular trips to explore the New Zealand countryside; she would frequently visit her lover Harvey Gresham in North Canterbury, and Jean Stevenson's brother took her and Olivia Spencer Bower on a sketching trip to Mount Torlesse.

In May 1936 Angus took the three-hour train journey to the Mountain Biological Station operated by Canterbury University College at Cass, 116 km (72 mi) from Christchurch. She was accompanied by painters Louise Henderson and Julia Scarvell. The trio stayed for ten days at the Biological Station, sketching the surrounding landscape.

Mountain Biological Field Station, Cass by Rita Angus (1936)

Angus either painted or began five works as a result of the trip. Two watercolours, both called Mountains, Cass, depicted the mountains north-west of the settlement with a musterer's hut in the foreground. One, painted on site, is in Te Papa's collection, and the other, completed later in her studio, is in the Christchurch Art Gallery. Two, both titled Mountain Biological Station, Cass, depicted the field station at which she stayed with a train passing in the background, in watercolour and in oils. The subject she chose for her fifth painting was the small railway station at Cass.

On her return to Christchurch, Angus painted Cass in her studio from studies done on site. She also wrote about the landscape: "…those days of clear blue skies, sun setting behind the dark hills, cold shadows, thin smoke from the chimney, ascending in a straight line. They were happy days…"

Louise Henderson exhibited five Cass-related works based on her sketches at the December 1936 show of The Group, only one of which (the oil painting Plain and Hills) survives, in the collection of the Christchurch Art Gallery. Her own depiction of Cass Station is lost.

== Description ==
Like the rest of her and Louise Henderson's Cass paintings, this work emphasises the human intrusion into the high country landscapes: huts, trains, radiata pine trees, and telegraph poles. Unlike Henderson, Angus leaves the telegraph lines off her poles, presumably to prevent them interfering with the composition. Angus later wrote that "Cass at that time appeared as a 'break away' from the academic, but resulted from an intense interest in the old masters, through mathematics, e.g. geometry," and the geometric composition of the painting is strong, with vertical telegraph pole and doors contrasting with the diagonal lines of mountains, roof and shadows.

Angus wrote that Cass "was a subject already to be seen…the landscape (subject) suggested the painting, composition triangles, slopes of hills…" Cass depicts the archetypal South Island high country, with tussock grassland, scree, and southern beech forest, painted in a clear, direct manner, in contrast to the picturesque landscape painting that was the common style in New Zealand art societies. Unlike those paintings, which depicted empty wildernesses, Cass is a landscape full of, and transformed by, human presence.

The central pyramidal form created by the station and trees is echoed and enlarged by the mountains in the background, with shades of purple; the sky is filled with swirling clouds. The mountains, which have been manipulated in size to make the composition more compelling, contrast with the small, human details in the foreground: sawn timber, a railway wagon, luggage, and a solitary human figure in a suit and hat sitting on the platform.

In a 1937 Christchurch Press review, the writer suggested Angus had been influenced by Guy Kortright's landscapes, but Christopher Perkins and Rata Lovell-Smith have stronger affinities with her work. Her linear, crisp style contrasted with the Impressionistic landscapes of the Canterbury school, which A.R.D. Fairburn lambasted for making the "great crouching tigers" of the Southern Alps resemble "Sunday icecream". Her work at this time, and that of Bill Sutton, Doris Lusk, and Rata Lovell-Smith has been called "regionalist" or "regional realist". Angus was attempting to revitalise a realist landscape art tradition using the tools of modern art like stylisation, bright colour, and decorative patterns, as were her contemporaries Grant Wood, Margaret Preston, and Emily Carr.

The finished painting is signed "Rita Cook" on the lower right of the canvas. Although she had separated from her husband Alfred Cook in 1934, under New Zealand law amicable divorce required three years of separation. Angus continued to use the name "Rita Cook", under which she had established her reputation as an artist, until 1947, eight years after her divorce.

== Reception and influence ==
Cass was exhibited for the first time at the Canterbury Society of Arts exhibition in March 1937, along with the studio watercolour Mountains, Cass and one other work. None of the three were chosen to illustrate the CSA catalogue. Cass was priced at eight guineas, the larger watercolour at ten guineas; neither sold.

Cass was however chosen by A.H. McLintock for the 1940 National Centennial Exhibition of New Zealand Art, along with Angus's Self-Portrait (1936). McCormick in his survey Letters and Art in New Zealand mentions her along with Toss Wollaston as "promising talent … to be found in those artists who have begun to interpret the New Zealand landscape with vision and technique refreshed by study of the post-impressionists." In the Department of Internal Affairs' 1945 Introduction to New Zealand, an illustration of Cass was included and the author noted that "some of Rita Cook's landscapes have an arresting simplicity; her Gas Works and Cass show her grasp of something truly indigenous."

Angus herself was convinced that Cass was a significant work. In 1944 she wrote to composer Douglas Lilburn "How little did I think then, or forsee my life these last ten years, or that Cass…would come to have any meaning for the painter." When she moved to Clifton near Sumner in 1943, she took the painting which had been in storage in a suitcase and hung it in pride of place. She kept the painting, although occasionally loaned it to friends, including Douglas Lilburn and Bill Sutton. Lilburn borrowed it in 1944, and for years it hung above the piano in his Cambridge Terrace flat, where it in his words "lent warmth and vitality to the room and gave encouragement to my work". Lilburn tried repeatedly to buy it, but Angus refused:

"No Gordon dear, there is no chance of your possessing 'Cass', ever.…It's useless, I shall not sell.…You will be able to purchase colour prints of some of my work one day, including 'Cass'."

Angus once mentioned to her friend Bruce Godward that the New Zealand Railways centenary would fall on 1965, and she wanted to put forward Cass as a design for a commemorative stamp.

In July 1955, after Angus had left Christchurch, Cass was purchased by the Robert McDougall Art Gallery (now the Christchurch Art Gallery Te Puna o Waiwhetū) for £42, her first sale to a major public collection and her most important sale of the early 1950s. The sale was facilitated by her friend Bill Sutton, who was on the gallery's advisory committee, and in whose house Cass was hanging at the time. Since its purchase the Gallery has shown Cass regularly and has taken a particular interest in collecting and exhibiting materials associated with it.

Cass has been described as "one of the defining works of the 1930s and indeed of New Zealand art history." It was voted New Zealand's greatest painting in a 2006 poll on the Television New Zealand arts programme Frontseat. The runners-up were works by Colin McCahon, Bill Hammond, Grahame Sydney, Robin White, and Petrus Van der Velden.

Cass's influence has led several artists to create responses:

- Cass (1986), a diptych by Julian Dashper pairing a photograph of the railway station with an interpretation in pastels, and Cass Altarpiece (1986), a large oil painting by the same artist
- Cass (2004), a colour photograph by Peter Peryer
- ~~CASS~~ (2012), a spray-painted interpretation by Christchurch artist André Hemer, part of a 29 September – 22 October 2012 Christchurch Art Gallery exhibition of the same name containing over 50 versions of the Angus painting.

== Selected exhibitions ==
1937: Canterbury Society of Arts Annual Exhibition, Christchurch. This was the first time Cass was exhibited publicly.

1940: Centennial Exhibition of New Zealand Art, Wellington. Cass was illustrated in the catalogue as plate 63, where Rita Cook was noted as having "interesting modern tendencies". Over the summer of 1939–40 the Centennial Exhibition was visited by 2,870,995 people.

1959: The Land and the People, USSR. In response to a 1958 touring exhibition of Soviet art, Eric McCormick curated a selection of 100 New Zealand works, including Cass, which were shown at the Pushkin Fine Art Museum in Moscow, the Hermitage, and Tashkent.

1982: Rita Angus, National Art Gallery (now Te Papa Tongarewa). This exhibition curated by Ron Brownson, Anne Kirker, and Janet Paul toured New Zealand. Brownson noted in his essay, "The name Cass printed on the station anchors all representation to physical surface. The place is labelled as on a map and determines one's initial recognition of the picture."

1991: Pacific Parallels: artists and the landscape in New Zealand, The New Zealand-United States Art Foundation and the San Diego Museum of Art. Curated by Charles Eldredge, this exhibition toured seven venues in the United States. In Eldredge's discussion of Rita Angus he places Cass alongside the work of American painter Grant Wood, noting "the telling juxtaposition of present-day subjects and activities with the land’s traditions (alpine or agrarian) bespeaks a similar celebration of time and history."

2008: Rita Angus: Life and Vision, Museum of New Zealand Te Papa Tongarewa. Curated by William McAloon and Jill Trevelyan, this toured the metropolitan centres in New Zealand. Peter Vangioni's essay on the Cass works notes that "Cass remains an unromanticised vision of the landscape – a focus on what makes the region unique."

2021: Rita Angus: New Zealand Modernist curated by Jill Trevelyan and Adrian Locke. This exhibition of more than 70 works was developed by the Royal Academy of Arts, London, in partnership with Te Papa. Timed to mark 50 years after Angus's death, the exhibition was intended to be the first to show her work beyond New Zealand. The London presentation was cancelled owing to COVID-19 restrictions although the exhibition at Te Papa went ahead. A scaled-down version toured regionally in New Zealand.

== The station ==
The station depicted in Cass is a simple two-room building constructed in 1911 with weatherboard sides and a corrugated iron roof. It was built when Cass was the terminus of the Midland Line, before the railway pushed on to Otira to cross the Southern Alps. At the time Angus painted it a larger building and a refreshments room had been removed, but a goods shed was still present.

The station still stands today. By the 1980s it had been painted white (the colour depicted in Julian Dashper's photograph), but in the late 1990s it was repainted a uniform ochre red (possibly to more closely resemble the Angus painting), a colour used by museums to paint Māori carvings, known as "Museum Red". In the early 2020s it was repainted tan with red trim.

In 2024 KiwiRail erected a branding sign alongside the Cass railway station building. The move was greeted with protest, including from actor Sam Neill who was quoted as saying, “Which idiot did this? Come on. Put your hand up!". KiwiRail removed the sign, commenting that they were great admirers of the Angus's painting, holding it in “the highest regard”.

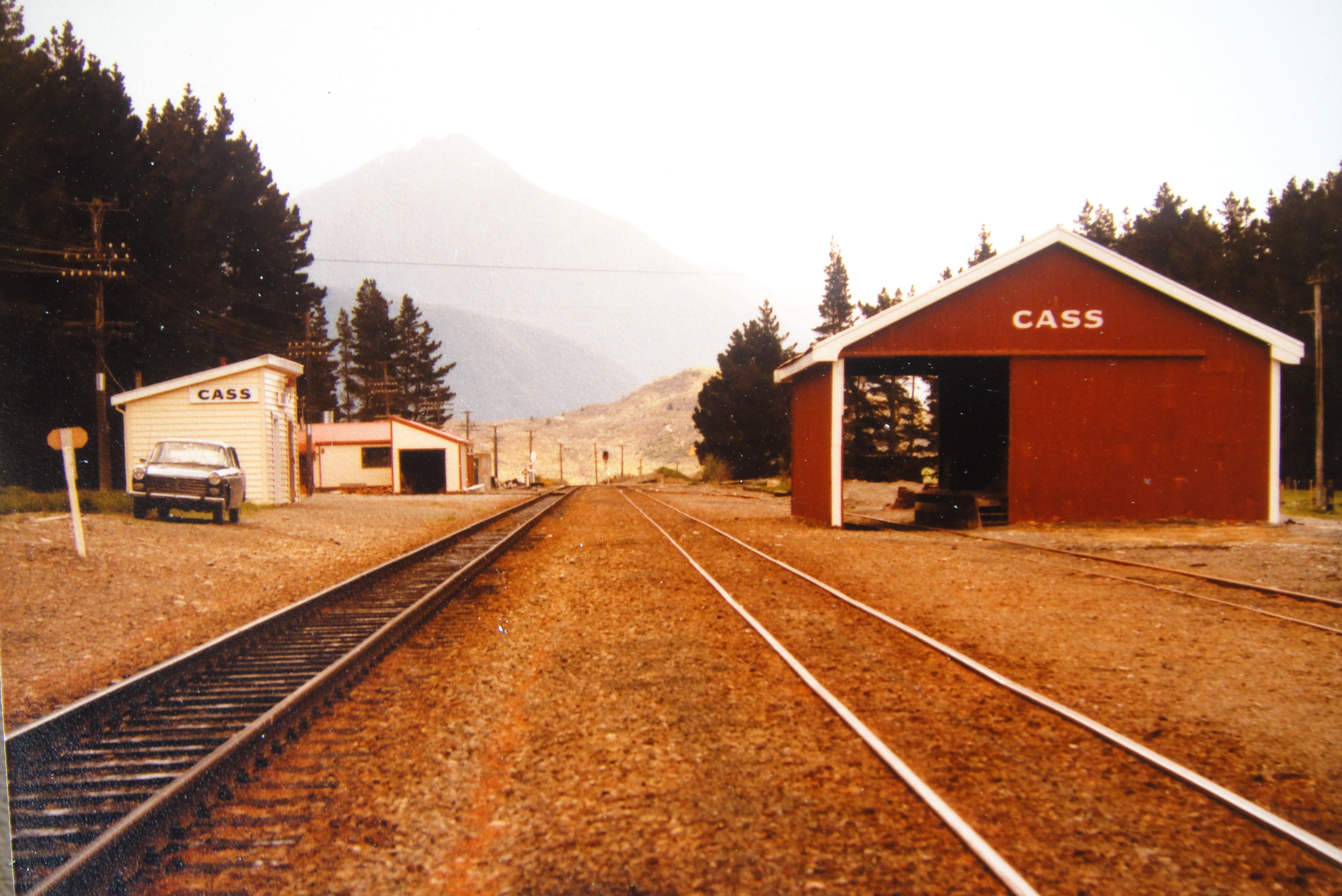
1984

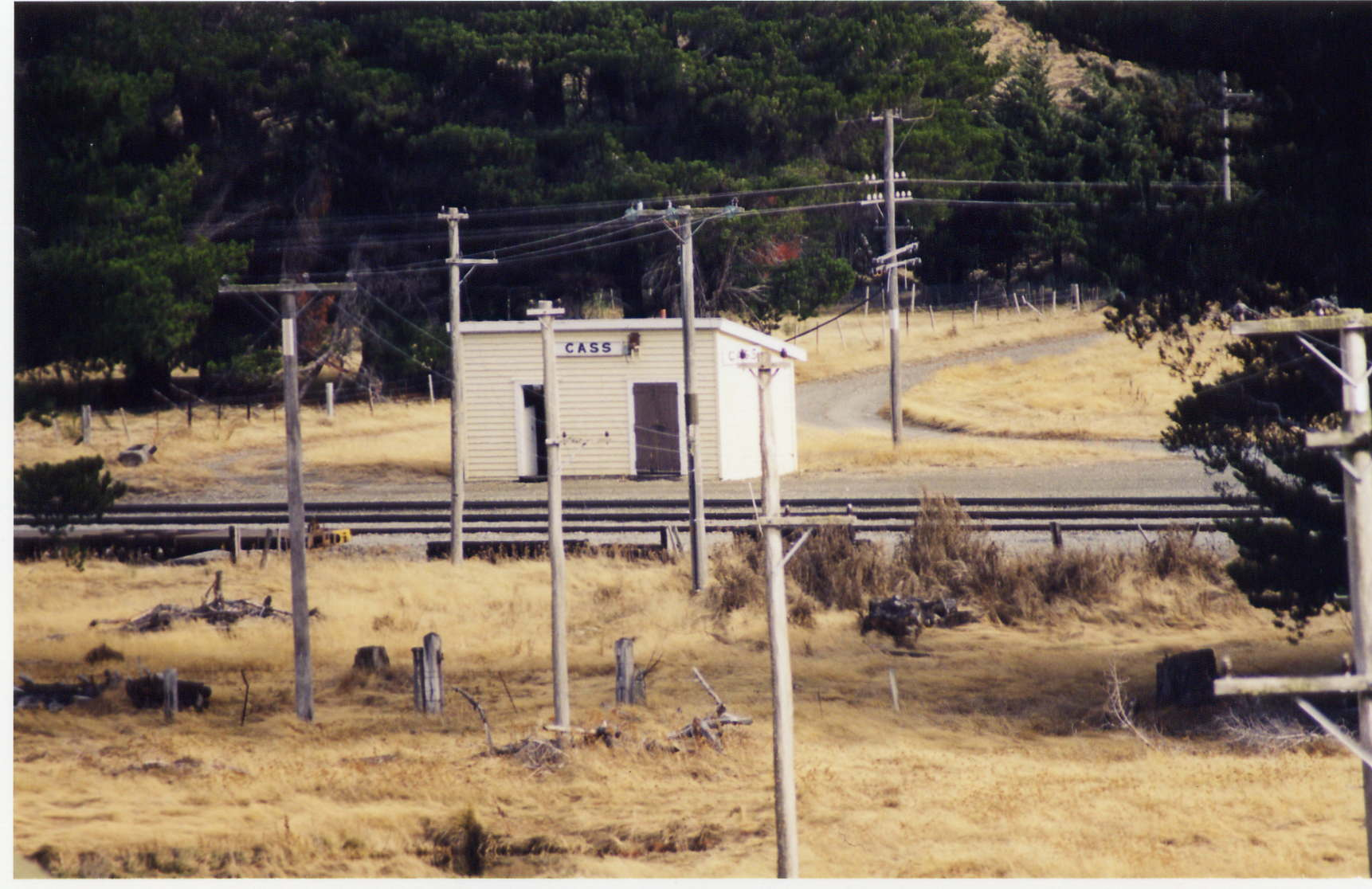
circa 1999

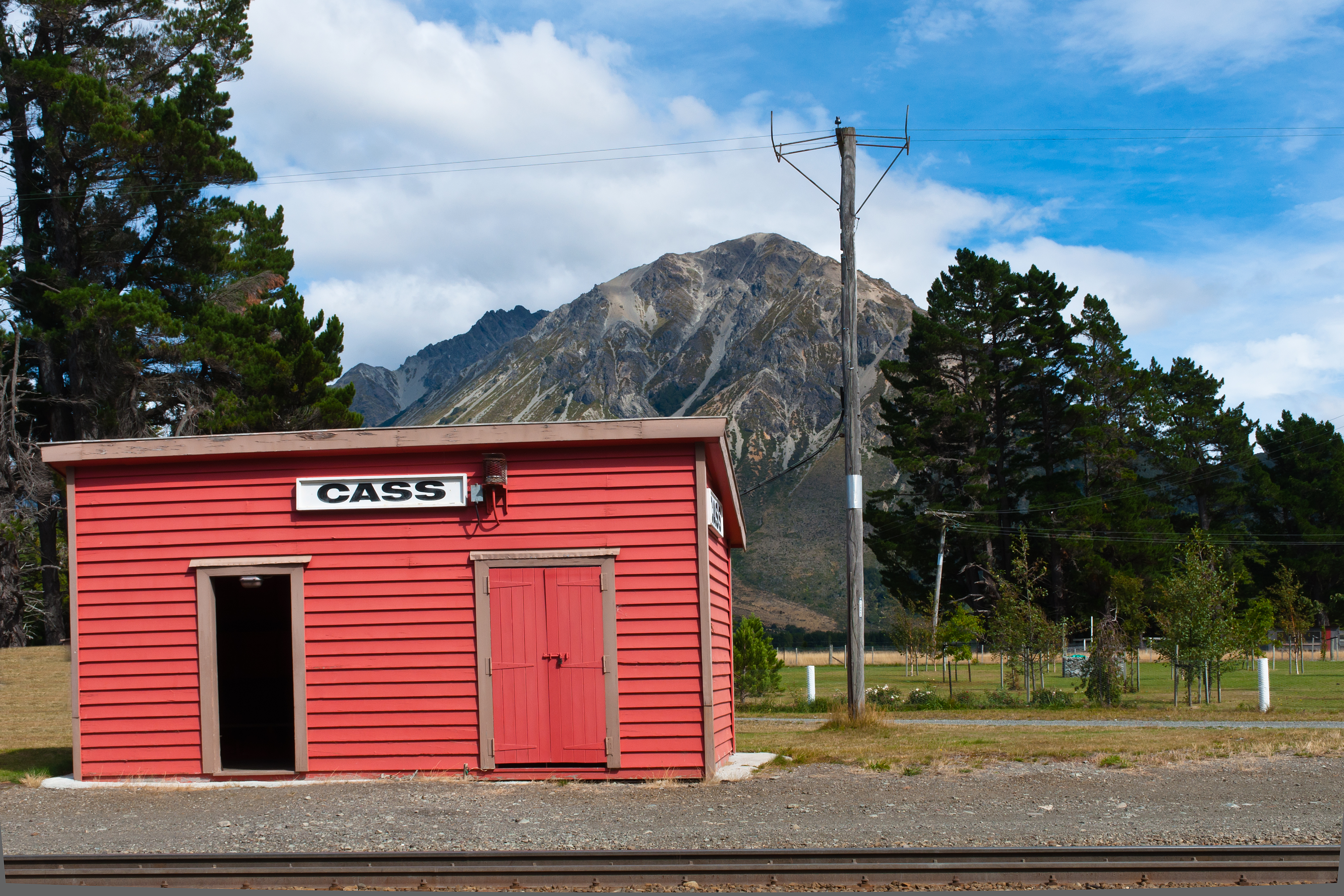
2016

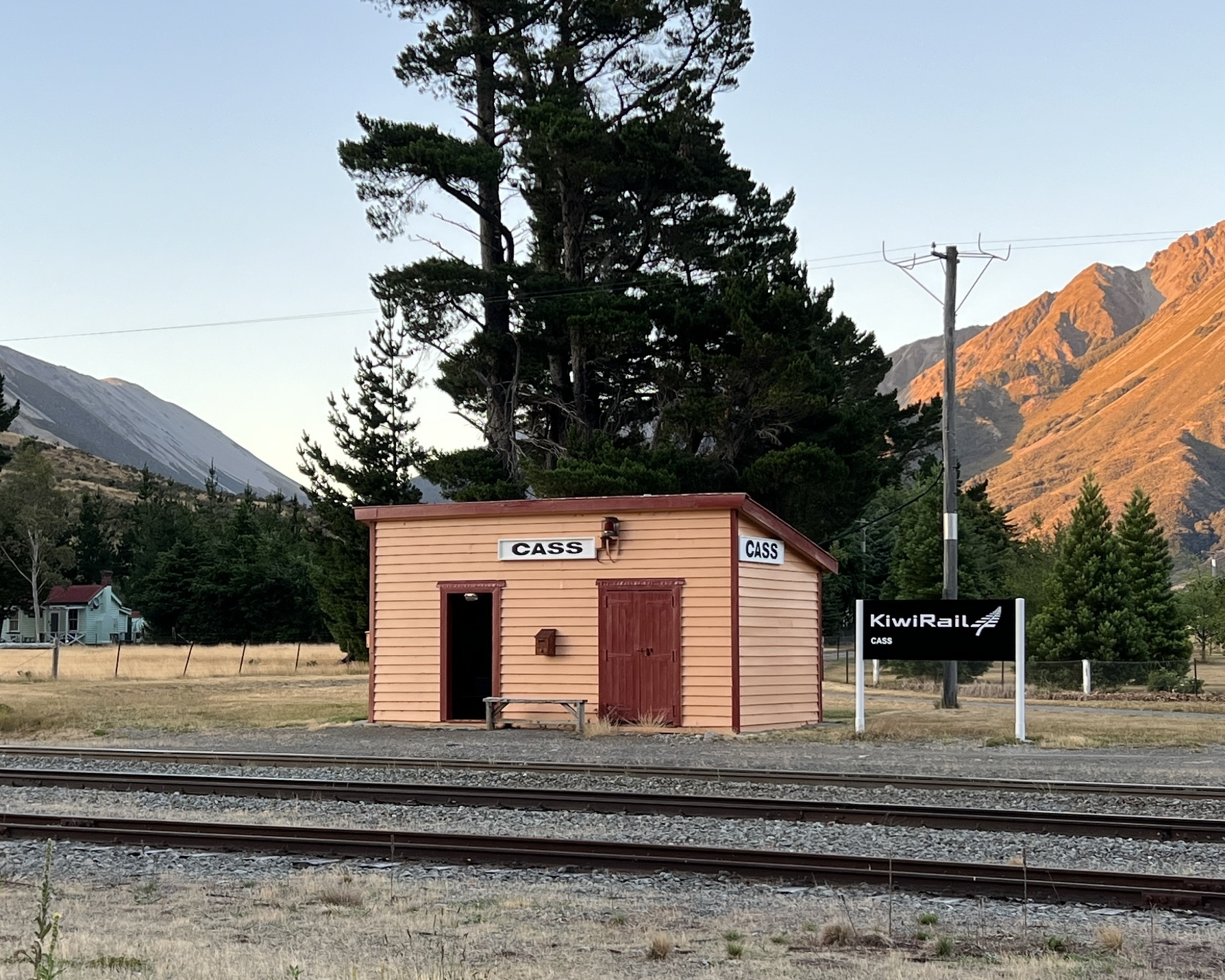
2024

== NFT ==
In 2022 Cass was offered for sale in an edition of 12 NFTs by the New Zealand company Glorious. The painting was displayed cropped at 4k resolution on 64" TV accompanied by a composition from jazz musician Quentin Angus, great nephew of Rita Angus.The NFT in the edition reserved for auction was sold by the International Art Centre on 17 March 2022 for $13,085.

The Christchurch Art Gallery took pains to distance itself from the NFT sale, which was arranged with the Australia-based Rita Angus Estate, and stated it "has not authorised, endorsed or approved the creation, marketing or sale of that or of any other NFT, and that neither the Gallery nor the Christchurch City Council is in any way affiliated with the company behind the promotion and sale of the NFT."
