= Cass Field Station =

Biological research station in New Zealand

- Cass Mountain Biological Station
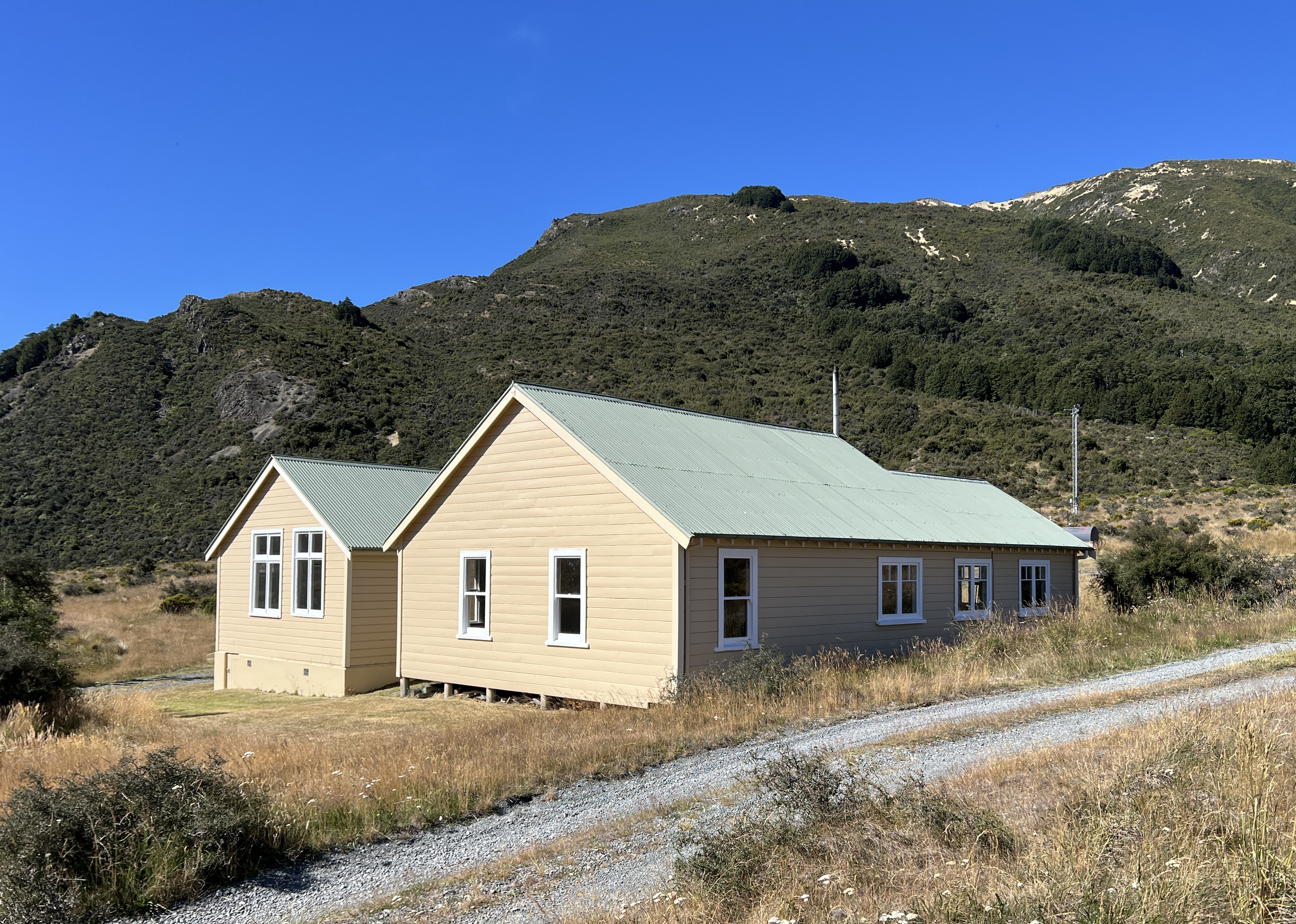
- Original 1914 building and 1959 extension

- Location within New Zealand
- Location: Cass
- Nearest city: Christchurch
- Coordinates: 43°02′04″S 171°45′34″E
- Elevation: 600 m (2,000 ft)
- Established: 1914
- Owner: University of Canterbury

Cass Field Station is a biological and geological research facility operated by the University of Canterbury located near the railway settlement of Cass, in the Canterbury high-country of New Zealand. It was founded in 1914 as the Cass Mountain Biological Station and was operated for many years by the university's Department of Botany. A significant body of research generated by the station has tracked biological change in the area for over 100 years.

== History ==
In 1873 the Canterbury Provincial Government endowed what was then known as Canterbury College with land in the Cass region to create a source of income. By the early 20th century, botanist Leonard Cockayne felt the need for a high-country research station and approached Charles Chilton, Professor of Biology at Canterbury College, and Geology lecturer Robert Speight. The original site selected in 1908 was Broken River, the terminus of the railway line from Christchurch, after which passengers switched to coaches to cross Arthur's Pass and reach the West Coast. By 1910 the railroad had extended to the railway camp of Cass, so the Canterbury College Board selected 10 acres of land there adjacent to Lake Sarah as the site for a research station. In April 1910 £200 was allocated for a building, which was constructed by the Public Works Department in 1912.

It was March 1914 before the field station was used for its intended purpose, by Charles Chilton. The facility and surrounding areas were officially opened on 29 July 1914 as the Canterbury College Mountain Biological Station, and Chilton led the first field trip there with six students in November.

In 1915 Charles E. Foweraker undertook the first Honours research project to be based at the field station. His photographs of the area are valuable sources of information for vegetation change over the succeeding century. Later that year, Chilton led two field excursions of women students to Cass, and published the first of seven "Notes from the Canterbury College Mountain Biological Station, Cass". He argued for the need for a completely fenced-off botanical reserve and setting up a station to observe the effects of tussock burning, a common farming practice.

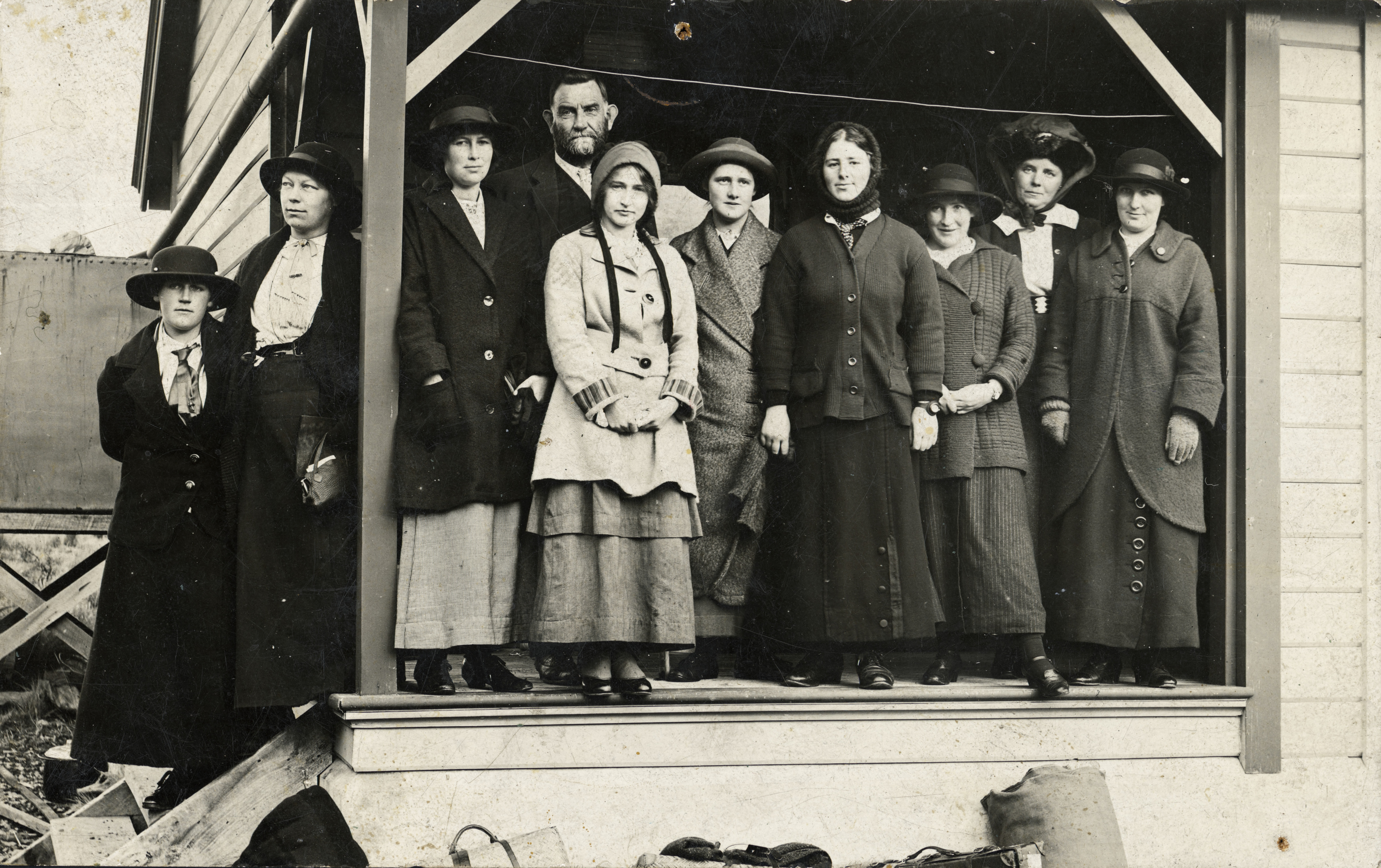
Charles Chilton (back) and students at the Biological Station circa 1920. Chilton's wife Elizabeth is possible second from right.

In 1917 agricultural scientist Frederick Hilgendorf installed a rain gauge and set up small. fenced-off exclusion plots to observe the effects of sheep grazing on native vegetation. He also began an insect collection from Cass. Entomologist Robert Tillyard visited Cass in 1920 to collect insects and described a new species of bush dragonfly Uropetala chiltoni from the area, named after Chilton. By 1927 the field station had hosted 18 student field trips – typically four students, a leader and an assistant – and four visits by other scientific groups. A bridge across Grasmere Stream suitable for motor cars was built in 1934. By the 1930s Foweraker was leading longer and more extensive botanical collecting expeditions to Mount Horrible and the Cass and Hawdon riverbeds, and Edward Percival was running 10-day advanced zoology field courses, which continued until 1945.

In the 1950s William Philipson began regular week-long trips for 2nd and 3rd year botany students, which focused on plant systematics and ecology.

A modern automatic weather station was installed next to the new building in 1997, along with a freshwater ecology building next to Grasmere Stream and a set of artificial ponds. In 2001 management of the field station shifted from the Department of Plant and Microbial Sciences to Facilities Management. A track was built across the Sugarloaf Saddle in 2012 thanks to the help of the University Tramping Club and BioSoc, and a high elevation weather station, Sugarbaby, was installed on top of Mount Sugar Loaf the following year.

On December 2–6, 2014, the University of Canterbury celebrated 100 years of teaching and research at Cass Field Station.

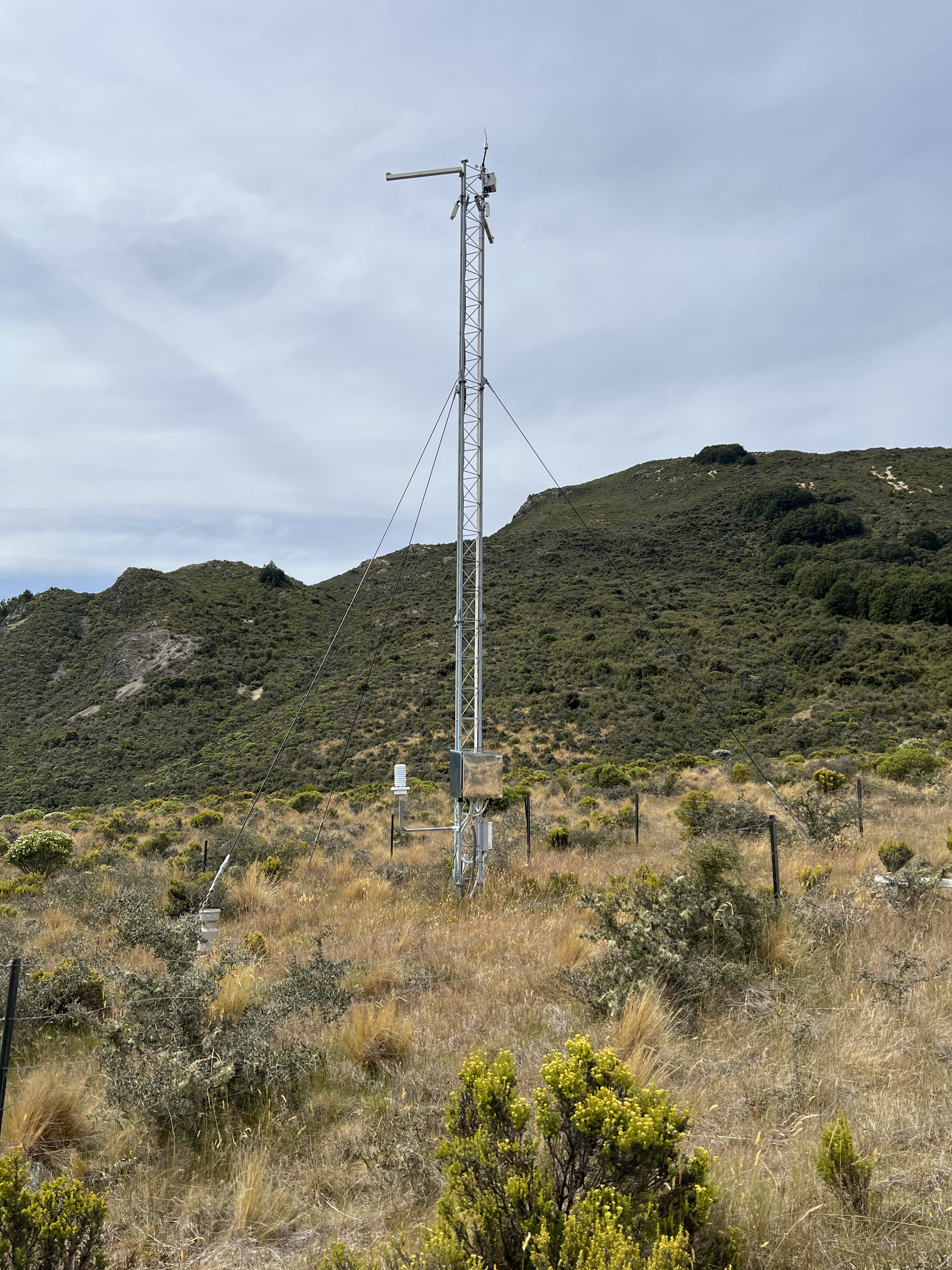
Weather station

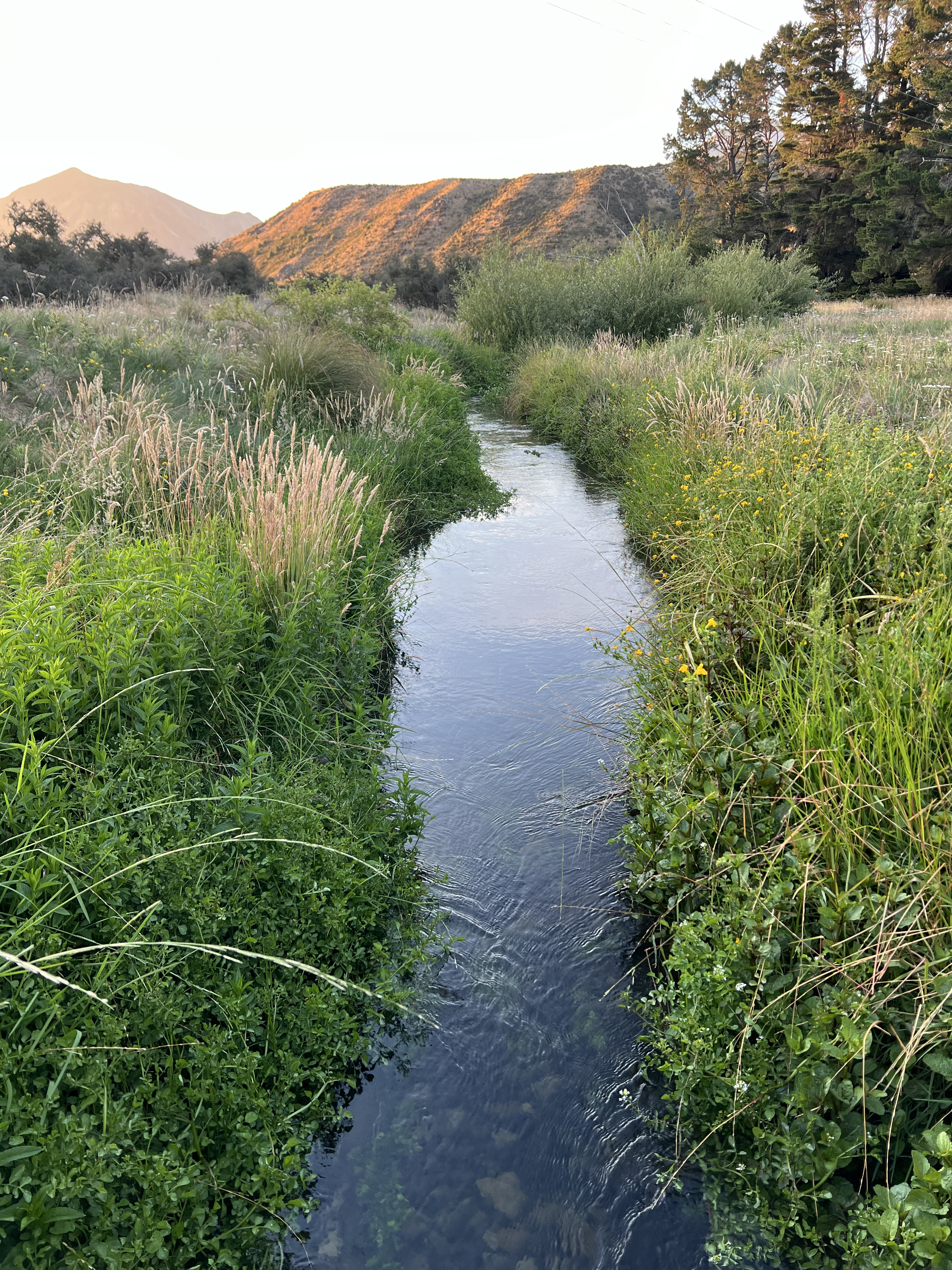
Grasmere Stream

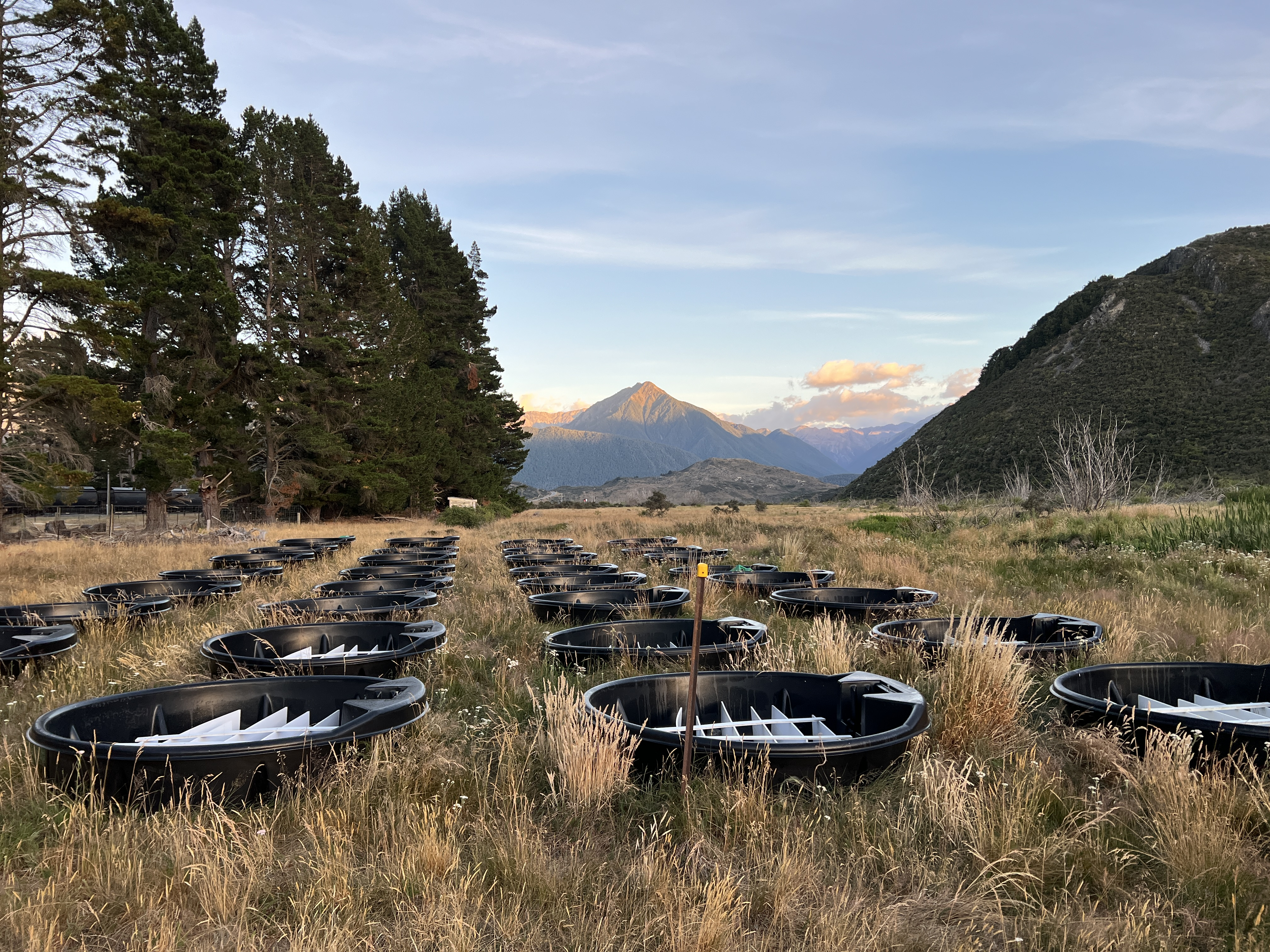
Artificial ponds

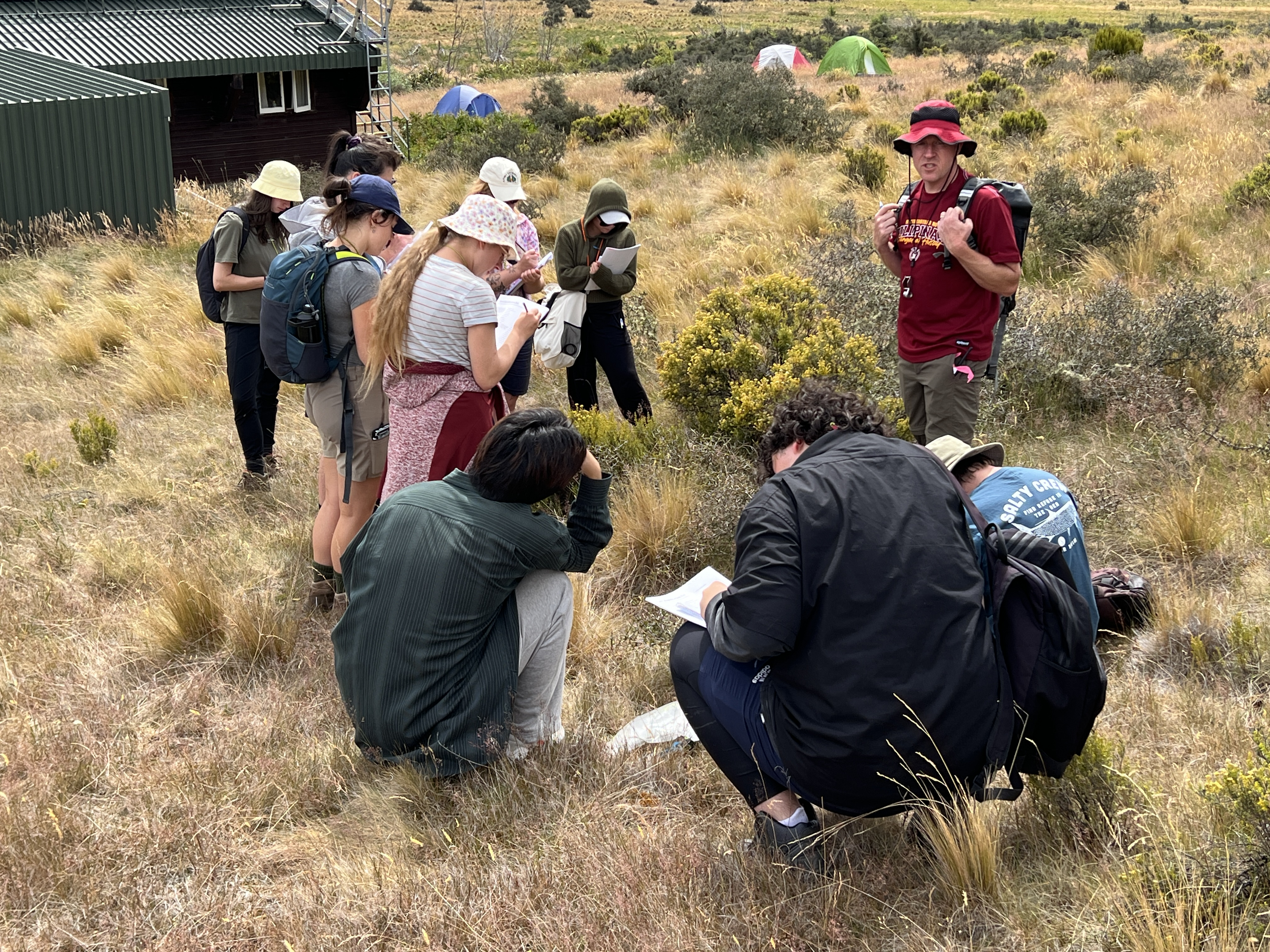
Botany students on a field trip

== Facilities ==
The initial plan for the field station was a single building with a living room, two bunkrooms, and a laboratory; a simpler version was constructed without a laboratory and just a single fireplace. In 1929 the building was extended, adding a laboratory, a coal stove, hot water and a bathroom. Electricity, supplied by the Railway Department, was not connected until 1937, and a toilet (emptying into Grasmere Stream) in 1939.

Mountain Biological Field Station, Cass by Rita Angus (1936)

In May 1936 the artist Rita Angus, accompanied by painters Louise Henderson and Julia Scarvell, visited Cass. Angus, then going by her married name Rita Cook, made preliminary sketches and studies for several works, including Cass, the iconic painting depicting the Cass railway station. She also painted the watercolour Mountain Biological Field Station, Cass, which depicts the original building with its laboratory extension and a steam train passing in the background.

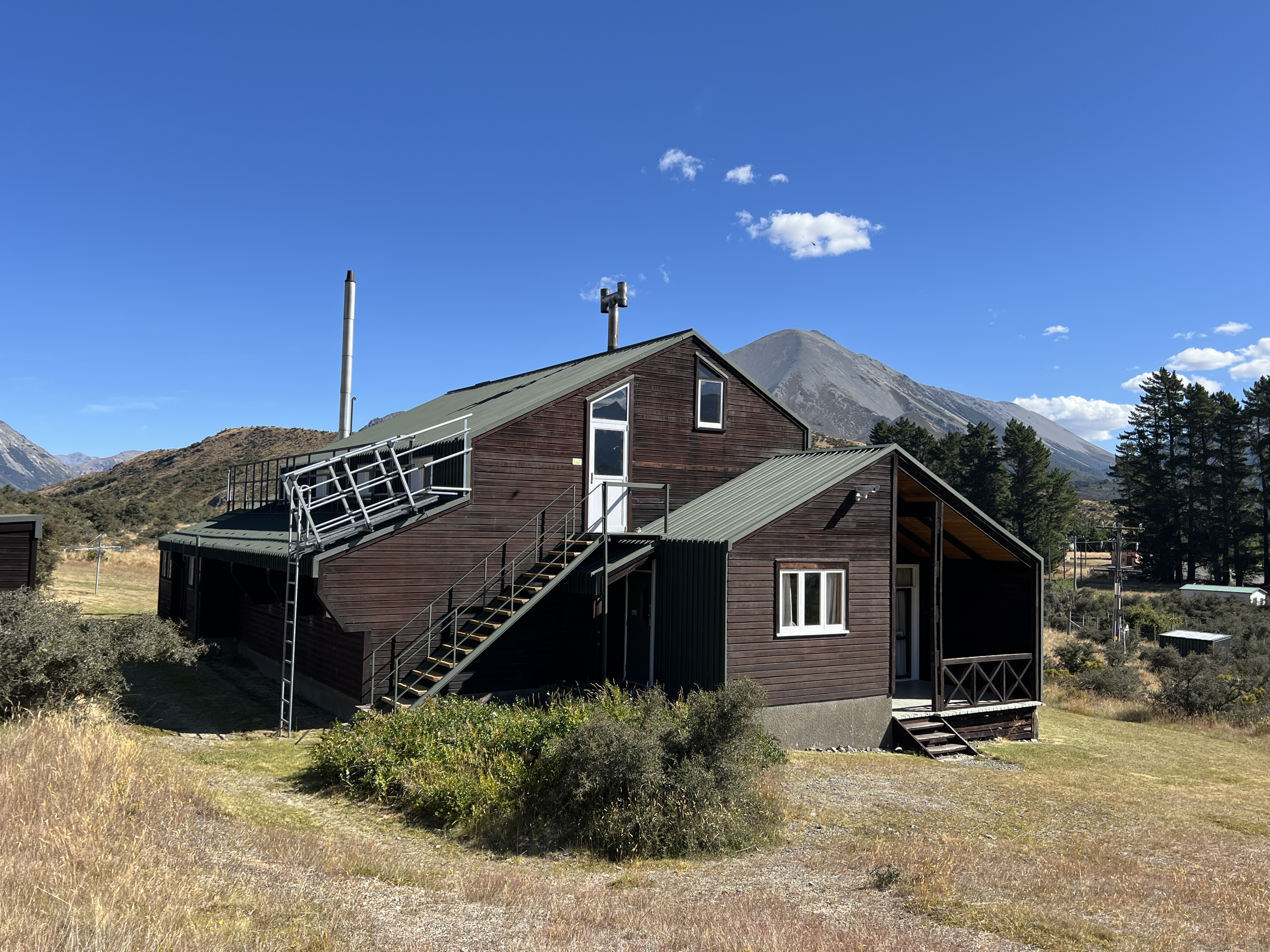
New building

The field station was expanded in 1959 at a cost of £2300, adding a building connected to the old building with a passageway. This added two shower rooms, a hot water boiler, two bunk rooms and a living room. The old toilet was replaced in 1968 with a septic tank, and a new bridge was built.

Increased numbers of undergraduates in the 1960s put a strain on the facilities, so the University Grants Committee agreed to supply $75,000, supplemented in 1974 with $25,000, for an additional building. Over 1975–1977 this new building, called the Teaching Flat, was constructed to the north of the original field station. It contained sleeping, living, cooking and eating space for 43 people. At the same time, the old building was refurbished with a dedicated teaching lab, offices, and research lab facilities. The first student field trip to use it was in 1978, and through the 1980s a wider range of students were able to undertake course visits to Cass. The old building was closed to overnight use in 2013 for not meeting fire regulations, but it still functions as a lab and teaching space.

== Research ==
As early as 1926 the Dutch geneticist J.P. Lotsy stressed the importance of hybrid plant collections from Cass and their potential use in evolutionary studies. Cockayne, in 1927, agreed that the area's polymorphic plant hybrids had value for evolutionary theory, and Swedish lichenologist G.E. Du Rietz also recognised the important role of Cass Station for plant research.

In 1958 Philipson and Garth Brownlie published The Flora of Cass, which included articles on history, geology, soils, climate and vegetation over time. Cass: History and Science in the Cass District, Canterbury, New Zealand, a more comprehensive collection of articles by a wide range of authors, was compiled by Colin Burrows and published in 1977.

In 1976–8 American botanist Richard Primack conducted research on flower pollination at Cass and two nearby sites (and also Aoraki / Mt Cook), collecting and interpreting data on flower visits by insects.

In 2001 the Fulbright Scholar Scott Wissinger studied the freshwater invertebrate communities of lakes and tarns in and around Cass. Jason Tylianakis in 2008 began a study investigating the effects of climate change on tussocks and their associated invertebrates with a large soil warming experiment.

== Publications ==
The following is a selection of research publications based on work done at the Cass Field Station.

- Chilton, Charles (1914). "Notes from the Canterbury College Mountain Biological Station, Cass. No. 1.—Introduction and General Description of Station". Transactions and Proceedings of the Royal Society of New Zealand. 47: 331–335 – via Papers Past.
- Cockayne, L.; Foweraker, C. E. (1916) "Notes from the Canterbury College Mountain Biological Station. No. 4 – the principal plant associations in the immediate vicinity of the station." Transactions of the New Zealand Institute 48: 166–186
- William Philipson; Garth Brownlie (1958), The Flora of Cass: a list of species (excluding fungi) known from the vicinity of the Mountain Biology Station of the University of Canterbury, New Zealand, Christchurch: University of Canterbury Department of Botany, Wikidata Q124309027
- Colin Burrows, ed. (1977), Cass: history and science in the Cass district, Canterbury, New Zealand, Christchurch: University of Canterbury Department of Botany, Wikidata Q117789333
- Michael Winterbourn; J. S. Rounick; B. Cowie (1981). "Are New Zealand stream ecosystems really different?". New Zealand Journal of Marine and Freshwater Research. 15 (3): 321–328. doi:10.1080/00288330.1981.9515927. ISSN 0028-8330. Wikidata Q124312976.
- James S. Rounick; Michael Winterbourn; Graeme L. Lyon (August 1982). "Differential Utilization of Allochthonous and Autochthonous Inputs by Aquatic Invertebrates in Some New Zealand Streams: A Stable Carbon Isotope Study". Oikos. 39 (2): 191. doi:10.2307/3544485. ISSN 0030-1299. Wikidata Q124312979.
- Laura Young; David Norton; Michelle Lambert (2016). "One hundred years of vegetation change at Cass, eastern South Island high country". New Zealand Journal of Ecology. 40 (3): 289–301. doi:10.20417/NZJECOL.40.38. ISSN 0110-6465. Wikidata Q124309018.
