= James Cook (artist) =

New Zealand-born Australian artist, curator and art critic

William Edward James "Jimmy" Cook (1904–1960) was a New Zealand-born Australian artist, curator and art critic.

== Early life ==
Cook was born in Heathcote, Christchurch, New Zealand in 1904.

== Training ==
Cook attended the Canterbury College School of Art from 1919 to 1925 where in 1926 he was awarded the Sawtell Travelling Scholarship using which he studied briefly, touring England, Scotland and Europe, and sharing rooms with William Dobell who remained a close friend.

== Teacher ==
Cook returned to Christchurch in 1927 where until 1933 he taught at his alma mater the Canterbury School of Art alongside Richard Wallwork, Leonard H. Booth, Professor James Shelley, Rata Lovell-Smith, Evelyn Page and Louise Henderson. Rita Angus, a fellow artist who was amongst the first students to sit the preliminary examinations held at the end of 1927 was briefly married to James's brother Alfred, also an artist.

In 1931 James joined an informal association of alumni 'The Group’ with which he exhibited in 1931 and 1932. In 1933, with his wife Ruth he returned to Europe and painted in England, France and Spain. Shortly after the commencement of World War 2 Cook was recruited by the British Ministry of Information as a war artist. Brown notes that he was just one amongst a 'considerable number of talented painters leaving New Zealand in search of artistic fulfilment, in most cases never to return...'

== Australia ==
In 1941 Cook moved to Australia to teach at the East Sydney Technical College (ESTC, later called the National Art School) until 1949, his employment interrupted by his WW2 camouflage work for the Department of the Interior, then from March 1944, he was official war artist for the Australian Comforts Fund, in Papua New Guinea.

Cook was appointed Director of the Art Gallery of Western Australia in 1949, assuming the role in March 1950 and remaining until 1952.

In his early retirement Cook wrote art criticism for Sydney's The Daily Telegraph 1952-59 and continued to paint. He gave Rosalie Gascoigne oil paintings of views from Mount Stromlo under varying atmospheric conditions, studies which he had made for a larger painting intended for the Wynne Prize.

Cook subsequently made a return visit to England and Europe, but died of pneumonia in Florence, in 1960.

== Style and reception ==
Smith in 1976 notes renewed interest in Cook's paintings, particularly those from the war period:

His drawings and his ability to visually articulate and describe through the use of the pencil have found few equals. It is in his paintings of military activities within the jungle environment that the full powers of Cook the painter and tonalist become evident.

McCulloch writes that he was 'a meticulous craftsman and a critic of integrity.'

== Collections ==
- The University of Western Australia Art Collection, Perth, WA
- Art Gallery of Western Australia, Perth, WA
- Art Gallery of South Australia, Adelaide, SA
- Bendigo Art Gallery, VIC
- National Gallery of Victoria, Melbourne, VIC
- Australian War Memorial, Canberra, ACT
- Art Gallery of New South Wales, Sydney, NSW, Australia
- New England Regional Art Museum, Armidale, NSW
