= Ellen Heine =

New Zealand botanist, botanical collector, photographer and artist

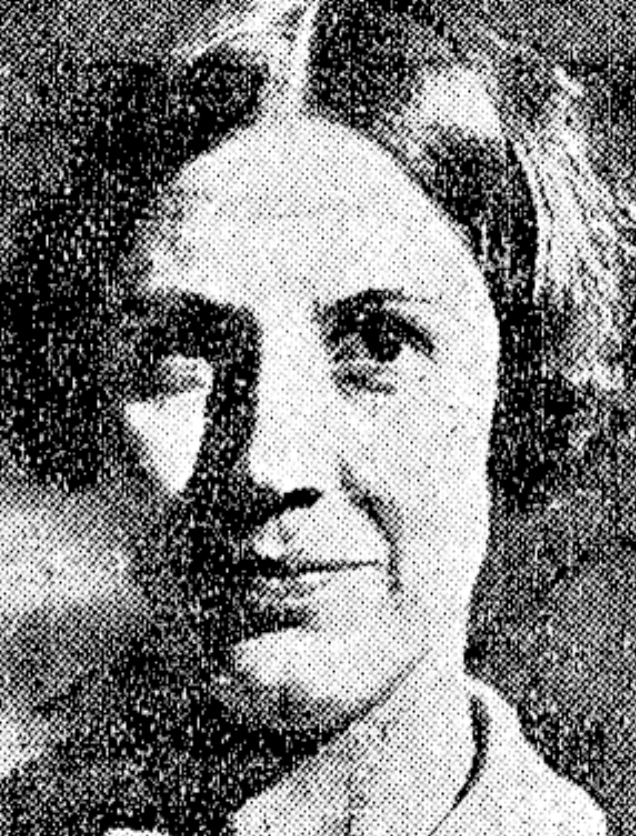
- Ellen M. Heine, from a 1934 newspaper published in New Zealand
- Born: Ellen Minna Bleakly; 20 August 1907; Wellington, New Zealand
- Died: 27 July 1989 (aged 81); Brisbane, Queensland, Australia
- Education: Victoria University College
- Known for: Photographic works. Research into brown seaweed Xiphophora in New Zealand. Research into the relationship between New Zealand insects and New Zealand native flower characteristics.
- Scientific career
- Fields: Botany

Ellen Minna Bleakly (née Heine; 8 August 1907 – 27 July 1989) was a New Zealand-born botanist, photographer, and painter. As a botanist, Heine made contributions to research into the relationship between New Zealand insects and native flowers. She also undertook research into brown seaweeds in the genus Xiphophora. Photographs created by Heine are held in the collection of the National Museum of New Zealand Te Papa Tongarewa. Of particular historical interest are the photographs she took of the University of Canterbury's Cass Field Station.

== Early life and education ==
She was educated at Victoria University College where she graduated with a Master of Science degree with honours in botany in 1929.
