= Colin Lovell-Smith =

New Zealand painter

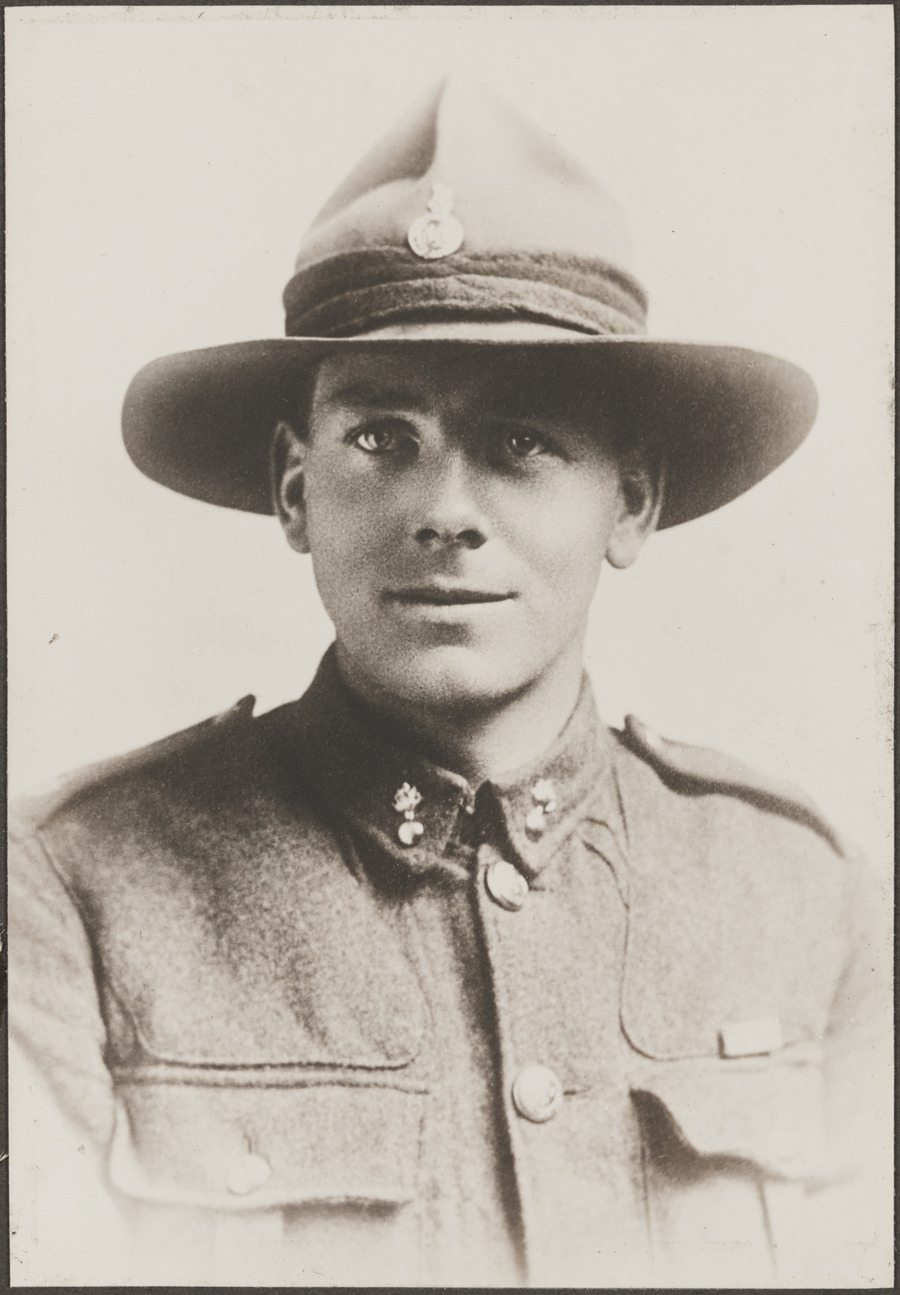
- Lovell-Smith, circa 1920
- Born: Colin Stuart Smith; 26 March 1894; Christchurch, New Zealand
- Died: 10 June 1960 (aged 66); Christchurch, New Zealand
- Education: Canterbury College School of Art
- Known for: Painting
- Spouse: Rata Lovell-Smith

Colin Stuart Lovell-Smith (26 March 1894 – 10 June 1960) was a New Zealand artist who with his wife, Rata Lovell-Smith, developed an influential style of representation of the New Zealand landscape. They were both teachers at the Canterbury College School of Art and he was director from 1947 until his early death from cancer in 1960.
