= Julia Scarvell =

New Zealand artist

Lucy Julia Barns Scarvell (23 January 1904 – 17 February 1985) was a New Zealand artist and art teacher.

== Biography ==
Scarvell was born in 1904 in Christchurch, the daughter of Merivale accountant John Larking Scarvell (1865–1937) (eldest son of livestock inspector Henry Ramsay Scarvell (1816–1905)); and Lucy Mary Scarvell (1868–1941), née Malthus, eldest daughter of Charles E.D. Malthus. The couple had three other children: Edward Beauford Scarvell (1896–1936), Mary Katrine Malthus Scarvell, later Murray (1905–1969) and a baby daughter Dorothy May Campbell Scarvell who died in 1895 aged 4 weeks old. Scarvell attended Rangi Ruru school, and socialised with artist Olivia Spencer Bower during her youth.

Scarvell was related to noted Australian painter Jessie E. Scarvell (1882–1950), who was the daughter of her grandfather Henry’s brother, NSW solicitor Edward Augustus Scarvell (1815–1883) and his wife Annette, née Want (1843–1923). Her grandfather Henry was also an artist: several of his works are held in Canterbury Museum.

Scarvell studied towards a Diploma of Fine Arts at the Canterbury College School of Art, graduating in May 1933. After Scarvell's family fell on hard times, she and her sister Mary were forced to work. Scarvell taught at the Canterbury College School of Art, under the direction of Florence Atkins who observed that Scarvell was a quiet person more inclined to embroidery than other handcrafts. After teaching at the School, Scarvell then took up an appointment as art mistress at St Margaret's College in Christchurch from 1934–1937, and then later taught art at Christchurch Girls' High School (1938–1948) and part-time at Christchurch West school (1938–1944). From 1948 she taught art at Timaru Girls' High School, from where she retired in 1960 after 12 years of service.

In May 1936 Scarvell and two painter friends, Rita Angus and Louise Henderson, travelled by train to the small high country community of Cass, 120 km north-west of Christchurch. They stayed there for ten days at the Mountain Biological Station owned by Canterbury University College, painting and sketching the surrounding countryside.

Scarvell was a working member of the Canterbury Society of Arts (CSA) from 1940–1951.

During the 1940s and 1950s Scarvell was active in the Canterbury Housewives' Union, a group dominated by May Furey.

Scarvell died on 17 February 1985, and she is buried in Waimairi Cemetery, Christchurch with her father and mother.

Christchurch Girls' High School annually awards a Julia Scarvell Memorial Prize for Creative Art in her memory.
