= James Shelley =

New Zealand professor

Sir James Shelley KBE (1884–1961) was a New Zealand university professor, educationalist, lecturer, critic and director of broadcasting. He was born in Coventry, Warwickshire, England, in 1884.

During the 1920s to the late 1940s James Shelley was a major influence on New Zealand's cultural and educational scene. His carefully crafted political and social contacts with New Zealand's social, cultural and political elites ensured that his ideas had considerable impact on New Zealand's cultural scene during this era, especially his efforts to impose an Anglophile, 'high' culture regime on the Dominion's cultural development.

Shelley was born in England in 1883. After graduating from Cambridge he taught for year, then lectured at various English training colleges and in the Education Dept. of Manchester University Taught for one year, before taking up posts at training colleges and University of Manchester.

After the war he took up new chair of education at Canterbury University College, but his aim of emphasising cultural training of teachers rather than professional training. Demanded B.Ed paper be cultural not professional

‘It is impossible for a student to judge of the value of educational processes unless he has a fair grasp of the basic elements of culture’. Shelley, Outline of a Scheme for the establishment of a School of Education at Canterbury College, 4 October 1920, cited in Carter, Gadfly, p. 90

In the 1949 King's Birthday Honours, Shelley was appointed a Knight Commander of the Order of the British Empire for services to education, broadcasting and drama.
