= Louise Henderson =

New Zealand artist and art teacher (1902–1994)

Dame Louise Henderson DBE
- Born: Louise Etiennette Sidonie Sauze; 24 April 1902; Boulogne sur Seine, Paris, France
- Died: 27 June 1994 (aged 92); Auckland, New Zealand
- Education: Canterbury School of Art
- Known for: Painting
- Style: Cubism
- Awards: QEII Arts Council fellowship (1973)

Dame Louise Etiennette Sidonie Henderson DBE (née Sauze, 21 April 1902 – 27 June 1994) was a French-New Zealand artist and painter.

== Life ==
Louise Etiennette Sidonie Sauze was born on 21 April 1902 at Boulogne sur Seine, Paris, France, the only child of Lucie Jeanne Alphonsine Guerin and her husband, Daniel Paul Louis Sauze, secretary to the sculptor Auguste Rodin. Louise remembered how as a child she would go with her father to Rodin's house at Meudon and play with chips of marble while the men talked.

In Paris she met her future husband Hubert Henderson, a New Zealander. Hubert returned to New Zealand in 1923 and proposed to Louise, but propriety demanded that a single woman not travel alone to New Zealand. She was married to Hubert by proxy at the British Embassy in Paris before emigrating to New Zealand in 1925 and settling with her husband in Christchurch where she began studies at the Canterbury School of Art. After earning her diploma in 1931, she went on to teach at the school.

In 1933, she gave birth to their only child, a daughter Diane.

Henderson died in Auckland on 27 June 1994, aged 92.

== Education ==
Henderson attended the Institut Maintenon from 1908 to 1919, passing her Brevet élémentaire in 1918. In 1919 she studied French literature, graduating with a baccalauréat, and from 1919 to 1921 she studied at l'École de la broderie et dentelle de la ville de Paris, graduating as a designer in 1921. From 1922 to 1927 she was employed to draw blueprints and write articles on embroidery design and interior decoration for the weekly journal Madame. In 1923 she also contributed embroidery designs to a Belgian journal, La femme et le home. She frequented public art galleries and was authorised to study in the museum and library of the Musée des Arts Decoratifs.

== Career ==
In the early 1940s Henderson moved to Wellington and became interested in modernist concerns after seeing a number of cubist inspired paintings by John Weeks, with whom she was corresponding. During World War II she worked for The Correspondence School; she championed embroidery at this time, writing in the periodical Art in New Zealand and a manual which was published by the Army Education Welfare Service in 1945.

In 1950, the family moved to Auckland and she attended the Elam School of Art but was frustrated by its conservatism. She continued to work in John Weeks's studio, however, and her work in this period became increasingly abstract and intellectual.

In 1952, at Weeks's urging, and with her husband's support, Louise Henderson returned to Paris for a year to improve her knowledge of modern painting. She studied there under Cubist artist and theorist Jean Metzinger. On her return to Auckland she was recognised as one of the leading Modernist painters. An exhibition of Henderson's adaptations of the cubist style was held at the Auckland City Art Gallery shortly after she returned from Paris in 1952. This show combined with exhibitions over following years in both Auckland and Wellington established her reputation as a modern artist of note.

Henderson's Canterbury paintings of hills, gorges and architectural forms blend observation with the visual language and aesthetic theories of the European moderns – Manet, Cézanne, Picasso and Braque. Her movement away from the topographical view of the landscape was shared by other local artists such as brothers James and Alfred Cook, Rita Angus, Roland Hipkins and Christopher Perkins.

In 1956, Henderson accompanied her husband to the Middle East when he was appointed a United Nations advisor. For three years she painted in Lebanon, Jordan, Iran and Iraq.

She continued to employ a cubist approach, at times almost totally non-figurative, for the rest of her painting life. In the 1960s she was frequently professionally linked with the abstract painter Milan Mrkusich; they completed stained glass designs for the Church of the Holy Cross in Henderson, Auckland, and were also part of a touring exhibition of New Zealand artists' work sent to Brussels, London and Paris in 1965–66. In the late 1970s and throughout the 1980s Henderson frequently chose still life subjects as the starting point for paintings. All these works contain faceted abstraction in a traditionally cubist manner but still retain enough figurative fragments to enable the subject to be easily recognised.

Henderson also frequently worked in tapestry. In the 1960s she designed a wool mural for the New Zealand Room at the Hilton Hotel in Hong Kong and made designs for the Talis Studio in Auckland, and regarded tapestry as just as important as her painting.

Henderson continued to be an active painter well into her eighties. Her outstanding contribution to New Zealand painting was recognised in 1973 through the granting of a Queen Elizabeth II Arts Council fellowship. She completed a series of works, called The Twelve Months, when she was 85.

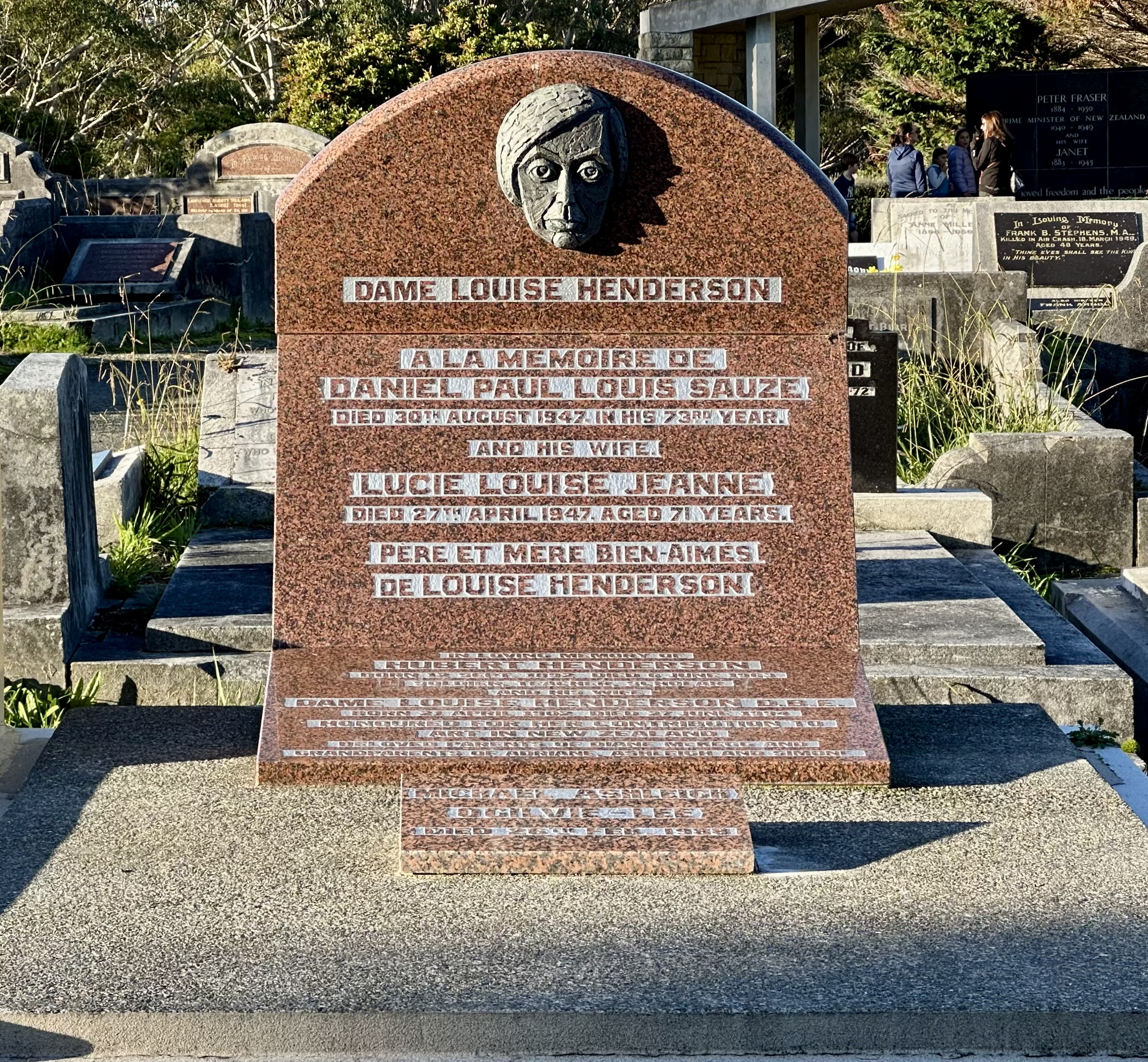
The Louise Henderson Family Memorial in Karori Cemetery, Wellington

== Major exhibitions ==
- 1935–1938: Henderson's first exhibition was with the New Zealand Society of Artists in Christchurch. She exhibited many times with the Society between 1935 and 1938.
- 1948: First solo exhibition was at Wellington Public Library in 1948.
- 1949: Exhibited at the Helen Hitchings Gallery, Wellington.
- 1953 and 1954 the Auckland City Art Gallery staged exhibitions of Henderson's work.
- 1965: Exhibition in Brussels.
- 1967: Included in the Royal Commonwealth Society exhibition at Bristol Museum and Art Gallery.
- 1967: Work shown at the New Zealand Embassy in Paris.
- 1990: Included in Two Centuries of New Zealand Landscape Art, at the Auckland City Art Gallery.
- 2019-2020: Louise Henderson: From Life, a posthumous exhibition of Henderson's lifetime of work, at the Auckland Art Gallery.

== Honours ==
In the 1993 Queen's Birthday Honours, Henderson was appointed a Dame Commander of the Order of the British Empire, for services to art.

== Works ==
In 1960, Henderson was commissioned to make stained-glass windows and a metal crucifix for the Church of the Holy Cross in Henderson. The work stands 3 metres high at the entrance to the church. In 1963 she was commissioned to produce a work for the New Zealand Room at the Hilton Hotel in Hong Kong: a mural, executed in wool, in 24 colours and measuring 1.5 x 6 metres.

In 2020, Luise Fong discovered a missing painting by Henderson, in Mount Albert Grammar School. Fong attended a function event, and was given a tour of their G J Moyal Collection. Art Galleries throughout Auckland and Christchurch were trying to locate April from The "Twelve Months" series for the exhibition Louise Henderson: From Life. Fong recognised the style and suspected it could be the missing painting, which it turned out to be.

== Bibliography ==
- Anthony Alpers, 'One-man Show at City Gallery', Auckland Star, 7 November 1953
- Tom Bolster, 'Show Points a Way for New Zealand Painters', Auckland Star, 2 October 1951.
- Warwick Brown: 100 New Zealand paintings: By 100 New Zealand artists. Godwit Press: Auckland, 1995.
- Elizabeth Grierson: Louise Henderson. Art New Zealand, vol 46, pp77, Autumn 1988.
- Louise Henderson, 'Embroidery as a Living Art', Art New Zealand, vol 14, pp37–38, September 1941.
- Anne Kirker, New Zealand Women Artists: A Survey of 150 Years. Craftsman House: New York, 1986. ISBN 976-8097-30-2
- Colin McCahon, 'Louise Henderson: Colin McCahon discusses the painter's work which was recently exhibited in Auckland', Home and Building, 1 February 1954.
- E.H. McCormick, 'The Louise Henderson Exhibition – A Note in Retrospect', Landfall, pp54–55, March 1954.
- Felicity Milburn, Lara Strongman, Julia Waite, Louise Henderson: from life. Auckland Art Gallery Toi o Tāmaki / Christchurch Art Gallery Te Puna o Waiwhetū, 2020.
- Con O'Leary, 'Auckland Artists will Exhibit in Europe', Auckland Star, 4 March 1964.
- Francis Pound, 'Louise Henderson – The Cubist Years: 1946–58', Art New Zealand, vol 61, pp62–67, Summer 1991.
