= Rita Angus =

New Zealand artist (1908–1970)

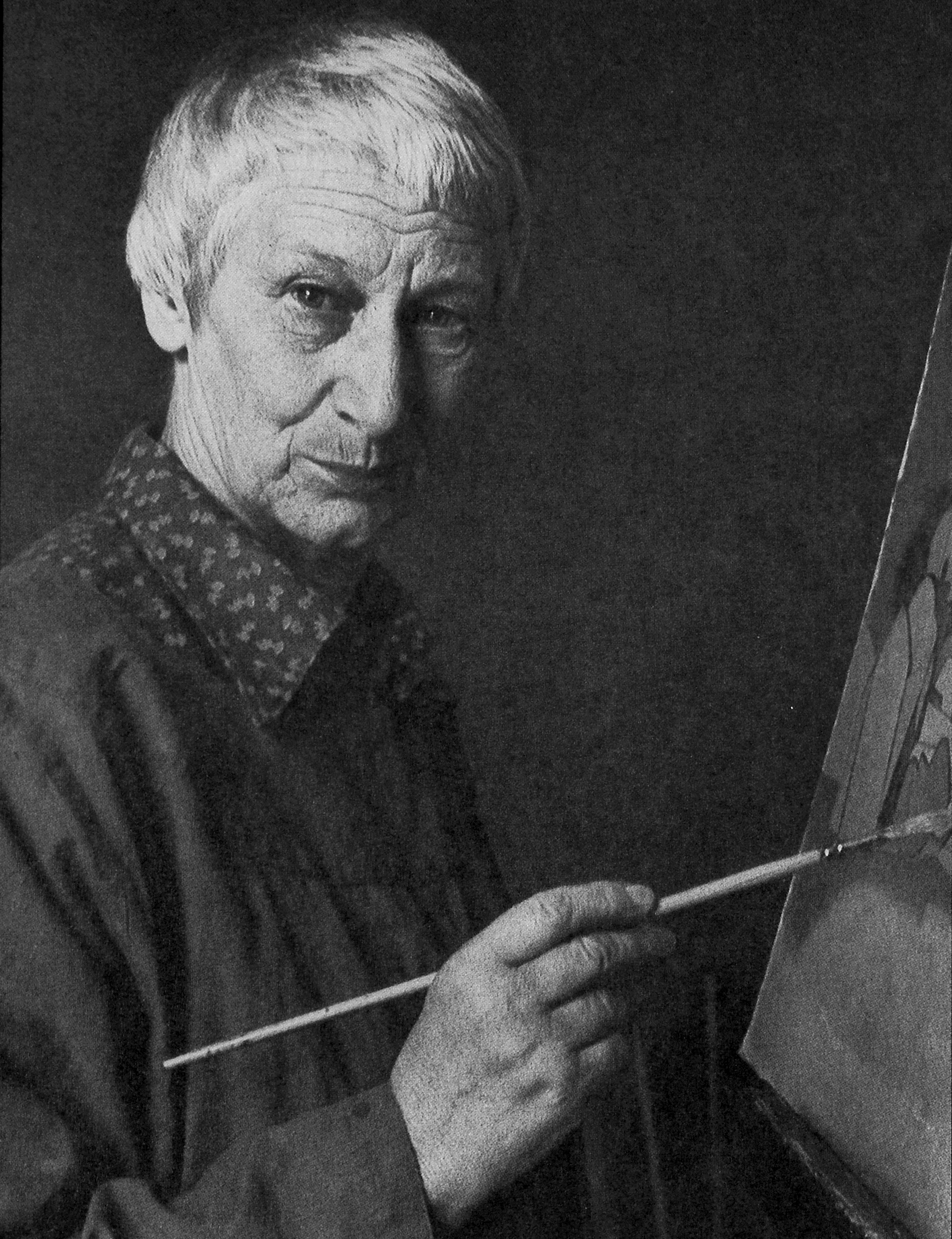
- Angus holding a paintbrush
- Born: Henrietta Catherine Angus; 12 March 1908; Hastings, New Zealand
- Died: 25 January 1970 (aged 61); Wellington, New Zealand
- Education: Canterbury College School of Art; Elam School of Fine Arts; Chelsea School of Art
- Known for: Oil and watercolour painting
- Notable work: Cass (1936)
- Spouse: Alfred Cook (m. 1930; div. 1939)
- Website: www.ritaangus.com

Henrietta Catherine Angus (12 March 1908 – 25 January 1970), known as Rita Cook early in her career, was a New Zealand painter who, alongside Colin McCahon and Toss Woollaston, is regarded as one of the leading figures in twentieth-century New Zealand art. She worked primarily in oil and watercolour, and became known for her portraits and landscapes.

== Biography ==
=== Early life ===
Henrietta "Rita" Angus was born Henrietta Catherine Angus on 12 March 1908 in Hastings, New Zealand. She was the eldest of seven children of Scottish–English parents William McKenzie Angus and Ethel Violet Crabtree. Her father, William, was initially a carpenter by trade and eventually established the major construction company W. M. Angus Limited, later known as Angus Construction Ltd. The nature of her father's work necessitated moving between Palmerston North and Napier to follow building contracts.

=== Education ===
In 1921, her family moved to Palmerston North and she attended Palmerston North Girls' High School from 1922 to 1926, where her art teacher, G. H. Elliott, noticed her talent and encouraged her to pursue further study.

In February 1927, Angus began studying at the Canterbury College School of Art. She never completed her diploma in fine arts but continued to study until 1933, including classes at the Elam School of Fine Arts in Auckland. During her studies she was introduced to renaissance and medieval art and received traditional training in life drawing, still life and landscape painting.

=== Personal life ===
Angus married Alfred Cook, a fellow artist and brother of James, on 13 June 1930, but they separated in 1934, and divorced in 1939. Angus signed many of her paintings as Rita Cook between 1930 and 1946, but after she discovered in 1941 that Alfred Cook had remarried, she changed her surname by deed poll to McKenzie, her paternal grandmother's surname. As a result, some of her paintings are also signed R. Mackenzie or R. McKenzie, but the majority are signed Rita Angus.

After a short period teaching art in Napier, Angus lived mostly in Christchurch during the 1930s and 1940s. In a difficult financial position after her divorce she took on different jobs including teaching and as an illustrator for the Press. In the late 1940s she suffered from mental illness and entered Sunnyside Mental Hospital in 1949. In 1950 she moved to Waikanae to convalesce, and then settled in Wellington in 1955.

In the early 1940s, Rita Angus had an affair with composer Douglas Lilburn, whom she met in 1941; she became pregnant but miscarried. The affair as such was short, but the connection remained, with Lilburn in attendance when she died in 1970. The affair between the two only became known after letters were discovered in 2002.

=== Death ===
From December 1969, Angus' condition rapidly deteriorated; she died in Wellington Hospital of ovarian cancer on 25 January 1970, aged 61.

== Art ==
Cass, which Angus made in 1936, has been called "one of the iconic images of 20th-century New Zealand painting".

Among Angus' influences were Byzantine art and cubism. She was also influenced by the English painter Christopher Perkins' 1931 painting of Mount Taranaki, a response to New Zealand's distinctive clear lighting. Her landscapes came in a time when many people were concerned to create a distinctly New Zealand style, but Angus herself was not interested in defining a national style so much as her own style. Her paintings are clear, hard-edged and sharply defined. In the 1930s and 1940s she painted scenes of Canterbury and Otago. One of the most famous of these is Cass (1936) in which she portrayed the bare emptiness of the Canterbury landscape using simplified forms and mostly unblended colours arranged in sections in a style remiscent of poster art. Cass was voted New Zealand's most-loved painting in a 2006 television poll.

For a while, she lived next to the artist Leo Bensemann. Their adjacent flats became something of a hub of the local art scene and it is said that they spurred each other on in their art. It has been stated that Angus produced some of her finest pieces during this time including many portraits. She also produced comic art, signed with the name Rita Cook.

Angus' pacifist beliefs can be seen in her art of the 1940s, when she avoided any kind of war work. Angus stated, "As an artist it is my work to create life and not to destroy it." She created three goddess images symbolising peace of which "Rutu" is the most well known.

In the early 1950s Angus spent some time travelling around New Zealand. One of her trips was to Central Otago, where she painted her well-known piece Central Otago. In 1955 Angus moved to Wellington and from this time her landscapes focused on Wellington and the Hawke's Bay which she visited regularly. Boats, Island Bay is one such iconic Wellington painting. She painted a large number of portraits, including "Head of a Maori Boy" (1938) and "Portrait (Betty Curnow)" (1942). She was able to capture the personality of her subjects, moving beyond a mere representation of their form. Angus also painted 55 self-portraits, particularly during her later years when she became afflicted with increasingly serious bouts of narcissistic disorder.

In 1958, she won a New Zealand Art Societies' Fellowship and travelled to London to study at the Chelsea School of Art and the Institute of Contemporary Arts. She also visited Scotland and Europe and studied modern and traditional European art. Angus devoted much of 1960 to the painting of a mural at Napier Girls' High School which can now be seen at the front of the school hall. The mural was commissioned to commemorate the girls who died in the 1931 Hawke's Bay earthquake.

Four of Angus's paintings were featured on a set of postage stamps issued by New Zealand Post in 1983 to mark the 75th anniversary of the artist's birth.

== Exhibitions ==
- 1930: exhibition with Canterbury Society of Arts
- 1932: exhibition with The Group
- 1940: Cass and Self Portrait exhibited at the National Centennial Exhibition of New Zealand Art
- 1957: Angus' first solo exhibition, at the Wellington Art Centre gallery followed by solo exhibitions in 1961, 1963, 1964, 1967
- 1965: Commonwealth Institute, London (Contemporary Painting in New Zealand)
- 1969: Smithsonian Institution, Washington, DC, (New Zealand Modern Art)
- 1982–1983: Rita Angus retrospective at the National Art Gallery in Wellington, New Zealand.
- 2008: a major retrospective of Angus' work at the Museum of New Zealand Te Papa Tongarewa (Rita Angus: Life and Vision) to celebrate the centenary of her birth, followed by a tour to main centres around New Zealand.
- 2022: an exhibition celebrating 40 years of Angus's work - Rita Angus: New Zealand Modernist | He Ringatoi Hou o Aotearoa. The Museum of New Zealand | Te Papa Tongarewa.
- 2023: Rita Angus: New Zealand Modernist Exhibition - Tauranga Art Gallery | Toi Tauranga (Te Papa touring exhibition)
