= Lincoln University Art Collection =

Art collection owned by Lincoln University, New Zealand

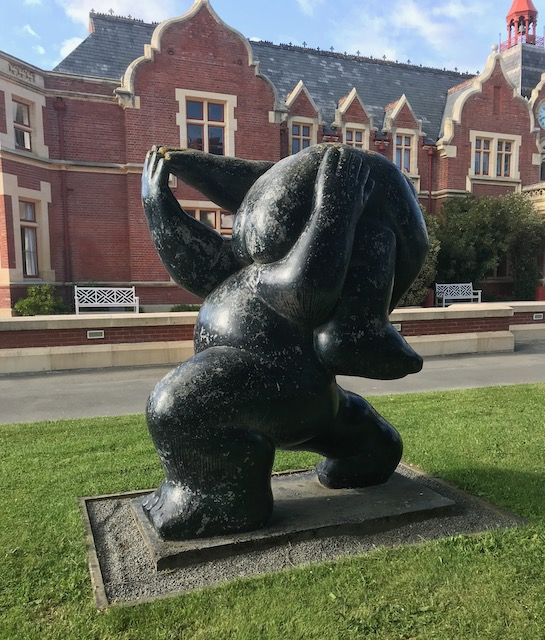
- Joy of Living by Llew Summers (1992), outside Ivey Hall
- Established: 1974
- Location: Lincoln University, New Zealand
- Coordinates: 43°38′35″S 172°28′04″E
- Curator: Millie Galbraith (2024–present)
- Website: livingheritage.lincoln.ac.nz/pages/LUArt_Collection

The Lincoln University Art Collection consists of over 280 works owned by Lincoln University, Lincoln, New Zealand. Almost all the works are by New Zealand artists, including Robyn Kahukiwa, Bill Hammond, and Toss Wollaston. Acquired between 1974 and 2014, the collection is particularly strong in artists from the 1980s and 1990s.

== Origin ==
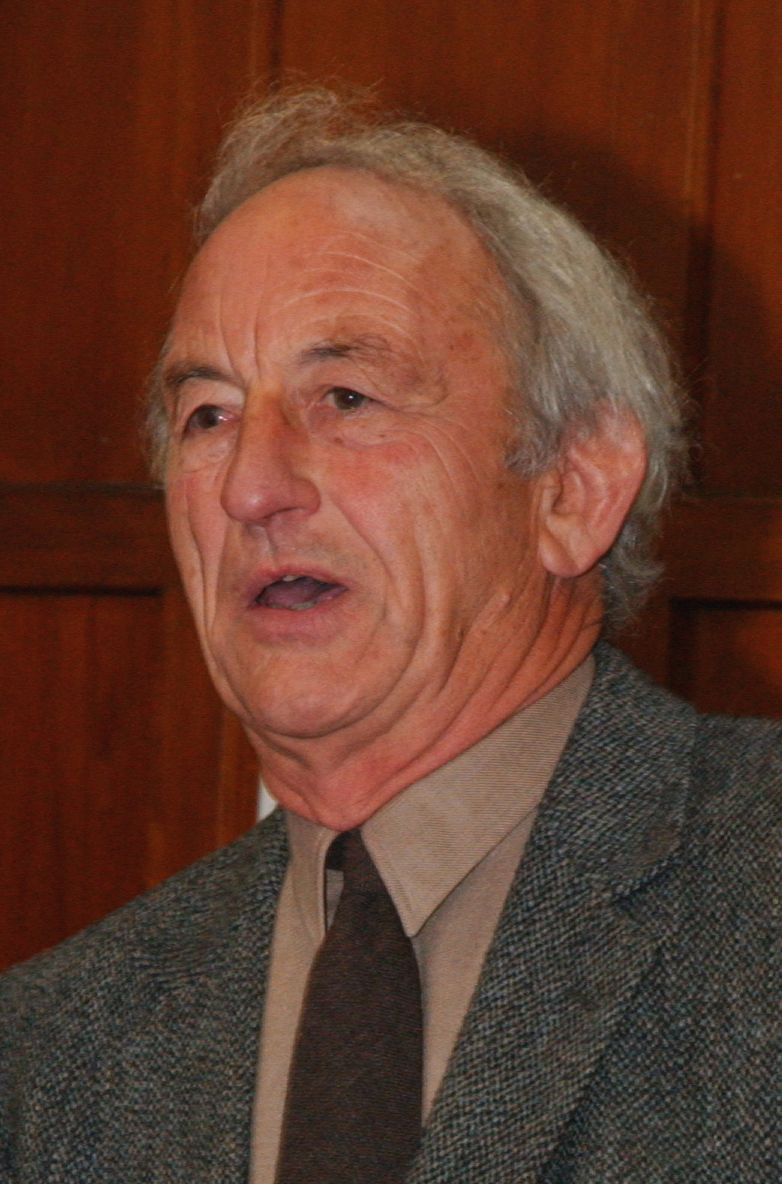
Dick Lucas in 2004

The collection owes its existence to two Lincoln University faculty members, Dick Lucas and Mike Smetham, both lecturers in the Plant Science department. Lucas was an expert on legumes for dryland pasture, and Smetham an authority on subterranean clover. Both were also collectors and appreciators of New Zealand art.

Although Lincoln College had from its earliest days acquired portraits of former principals and other people of note, it did not have a formal collecting policy. In 1970, the sale of cigarettes and biscuits at morning and afternoon teas in the staff common room had raised a reasonable amount of money, and staff debated how to spend it. After heated discussion, a motion was passed on 16 December 1970 to allocate $600 for buying artworks to decorate the Senior Staff Common Room that were "considered of good artistic merit, and, in addition, constitute a good financial investment." By the end of 1974, an Art Committee had been formed, with Lucas as Chairman and Smetham as curatorial manager, as well as Gavin Daly. They enlisted the director of the Robert McDougall Art Gallery, Brian Muir, to recommend suitable work, and made the first purchases in the collection: Doris Lusk's Hill and Stream near Kurow (1971) was bought for $350, followed by Michael Smither's Rocks and Butterfly: Rakaia River (1971). Later, Louise Henderson's Bush Revisited (1972), Toss Woollaston's Tobacco Kiln (1972), and a Marilynn Webb print Cloud Landscape, Central Otago 2 (1972) were added.

The Committee determined all acquisitions would be work by contemporary New Zealand artists who had exhibited in public galleries, "mainly but not exclusively from the South Island". As it was to hang in public spaces for staff and students to appreciate, the work also needed to have aesthetic appeal.

== Collecting ==
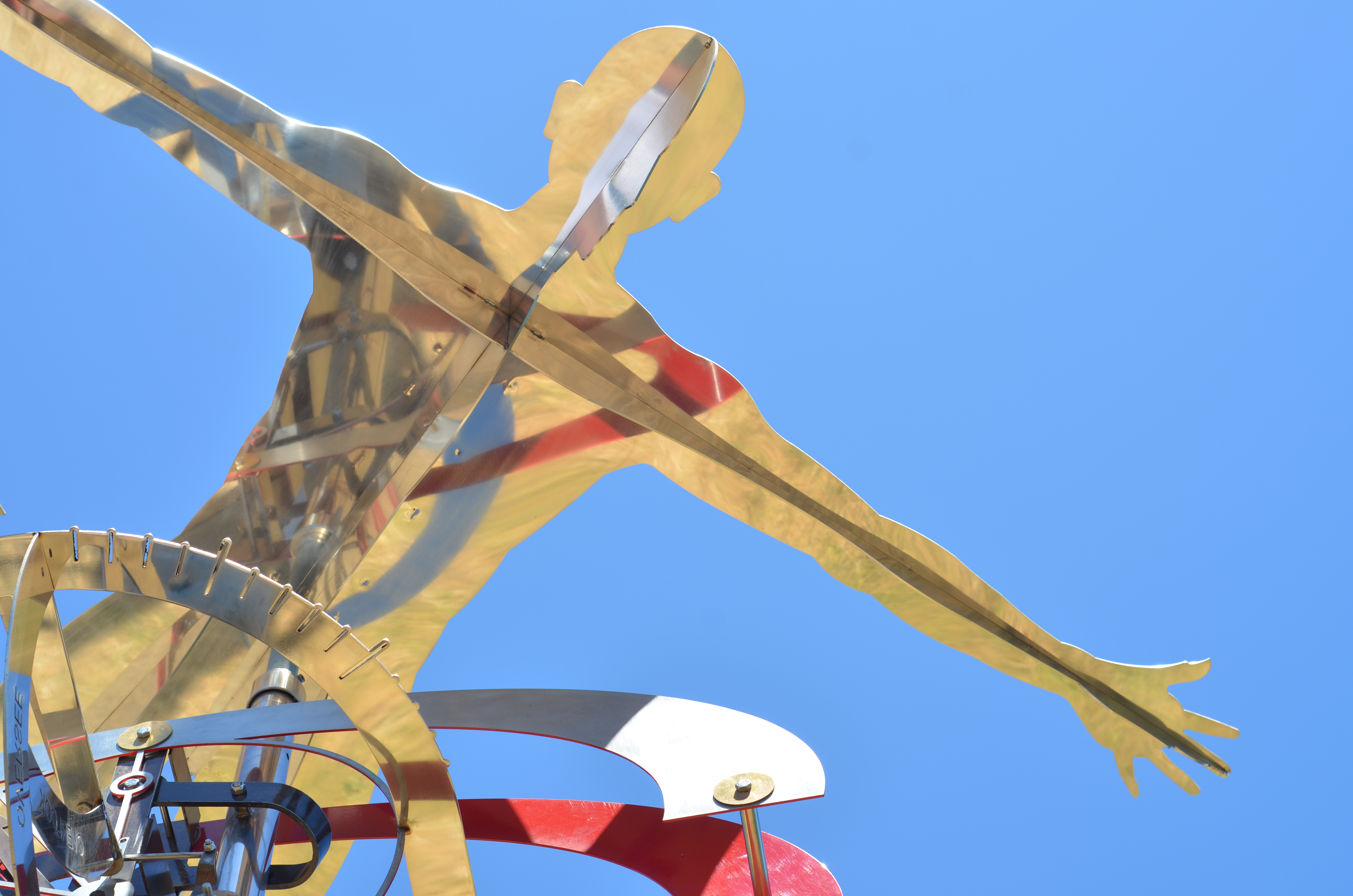
Oversight by Graham Bennett (2012)

Over a 40 year period the Lincoln University Art Collection grew from six works to 280. Funding was haphazard until art acquisition budget was formally established in 1987 by Vice-Chancellor Bruce Ross, who made the case to the College Council that art was an appropriate expenditure for what was then an agricultural college. This allowed for the purchase of works such as Bill Sutton's Plantation Series No XVIII (1988). The relocation of the George Forbes Memorial Library and the redevelopment of Ivey Hall in 1989 released additional funds. From 1988 on there was a recognition that the collection poorly represented work by women and Māori, and a separate account for purchasing Māori art was set up, which enabled the acquisition of Treaty Painting (1990) by Robyn Kahukiwa, three works by John Bevan Ford, one by Peter Robinson, and a set of nine Max Hailstone prints, Te Tiriti o Waitangi (1990).

After 1990, the Art Purchasing Committee controlled its own budget and would buy new works each year. This was a time of growth for Lincoln, with its change from college to university, the expansion of the library, and the construction of two new lecture theatres. Because Lucas also sat on the Works Committee, he was able to stipulate that the newly built lecture theatres had foyers able to display large artworks, such as Robyn Kahukiwa's Still Māori but Comely (1993) in the Stewart Building. Work from the collection was used for teaching Cultural Landscape in landscape architecture and design courses.

Still Māori but Comely (1993) had been purchased to commemorate both the 1993 centenary of women's suffrage in New Zealand and the Year of Indigenous People, and it was the centrepiece of the University's first public art exhibition, in the Stewart Building. Entitled In the Far South, the exhibition celebrated Suffrage Year by displaying all 30 works by women in Lincoln's collection. It included Joanna Braithwaite's controversial NZ Still Life No 3 (1990), which depicted a severed sheep's head; seemingly appropriate for a school of agriculture, this generated several complaints, notably from the conference of the New Zealand Society of Animal Production held at Lincoln in 1992.

As well as art for halls and lecture theatres, sculptures by Chris Booth, Llew Summers, and Neil Dawson were purchased for the university grounds; Llew Summers' Joy of Living (1992), the first outdoor sculpture purchased, is a popular photo spot for graduating students. Graham Bennett's 2012 work Oversight was created during his time as Sculptor-in-Residence.

By the late 1990s, art funding had declined, and new purchases were essentially frozen following the Canterbury earthquakes of 2010–11. Although the acquisitions budget was negligible, works continued to be gifted or loaned, such as Cheryl Lucas's Jug-skin Fence (2009) and Susan Chaytor's Still Life 1987.

Lucas and Smetham were both honoured with inaugural Lincoln University Medals in 2008, for their "sustained voluntary contributions to art and heritage". After 40 years' service, ten years after their retirement, they both stood down from the Art and Heritage Committee in 2014.

== Conservation ==
Although acquisition had largely ceased, there was a need to conserve the collection. Megan Clayton became the chair of the Art Committee, and a $200,000 grant from the Lottery Board Environment and Heritage Fund was secured, supplemented by funds from the University. This enabled the appointment in 2018 of art curator Fiona Simpson, who began a three-year project to conserve the entire collection. Simpson has expressed concern that there has not been a programme of new acquisitions by contemporary New Zealand artists – "There are many gaps in the collection due to the lack of a recent acquisition budget" – and some works, having never moved from when they were first hung, have "faded into the background".

== The collection ==
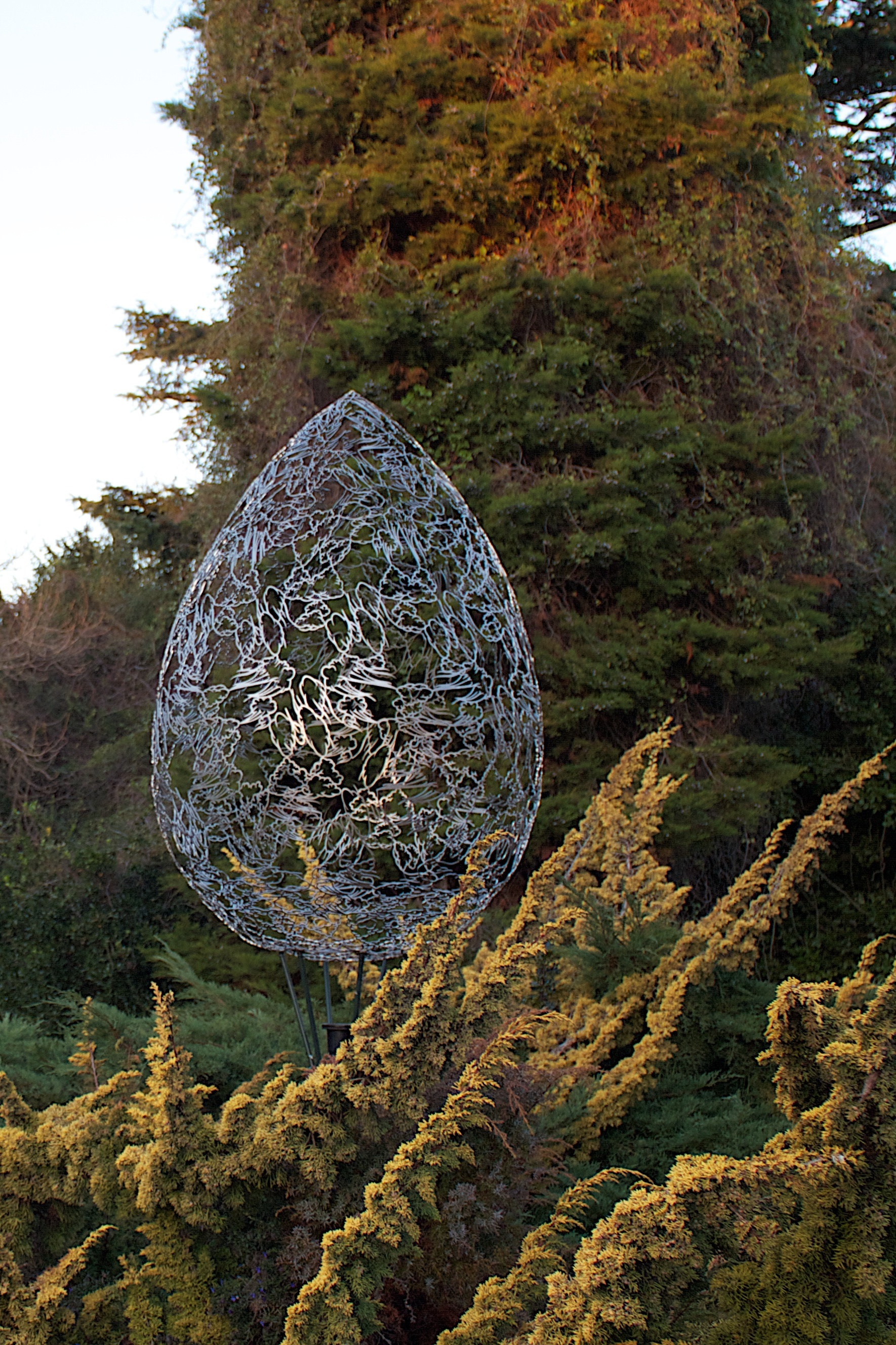
Neil Dawson's H_{2}O (2005)

The Lincoln University Art Collection consists of over 280 works; the oldest dates back to 1639, but most are by New Zealand artists in the 1970s–1990s. Most of the collection is on display in the George Forbes Memorial Library in Ivey Hall, the Stewart Lecture Block, the Commerce Building, and the Forbes Building. Selected works include:

- Bill Sutton – Plantation Series No XVIII (1988)
- Joanna Braithwaite – NZ Still Life No 3 (1990)
- Robyn Kahukiwa – Still Māori but Comely (1993)
- Bill Hammond – Talking All That Jazz (1989)
- Philippa Blair – Snowbound Cloak (1993)
- Toss Woolaston – Tobacco Kiln (1972)
- Marilynn Webb – Cloud Landscape, Central Otago 2 (1972)
- Don Binney – Auau Channel (1991)
- Shane Cotton – Tika (1997)
- Michael Smither – Rocks and Butterfly: Rakaia River (1971)
- Neil Frazer – Blue on Blue (1987)
- Austen Deans – Four Peaks from Geraldine Downs (1978)
- Esther Hope – A Peaceful Morning – Lake Alexandra (n.d.)
- Doris Lusk – Hill and Stream Near Kurow (1971)
- Patricia France – In the Far South (1990)
- Susan Chaytor – Edge Triptych (1972)
- Ted Bullmore – Mother and Child (1962)
- Max Hailstone – Te Tiriti o Waitangi series (1990)
- John Bevan Ford – Kaitiaki Figure (1990)
- Chris Booth – Te Paepaetapu a Rakaihautu (1997)
- Neil Dawson – H_{2}O (2005)
- Philip Clairmont – Black Crucifixion (1981)
- Graham Bennett – Oversight (2012)
- Llew Summers – Joy of Living (1992)
- Cheryl Lucas – Jug-Skin Fence (2009)
- Louise Henderson – Bush Revisited (1972)
- Philip Trusttum – Blue Fencer (1991)
- Gretchen Albrecht – Nomadic Geometries (Dawn) (1995)
- Euan MacLeod – Large Lyttelton I (1994)
- John Drawbridge – Still Life With Malevich (1988)
- Julia Morison – Anatomy IX, Hokmah (1987)
