= William Ivey =

William Ivey or Bill Ivey may refer to:

- Bill Ivey (born 1944), American folklorist
- William Ivey (agricultural scientist) (1838–1892), New Zealand agricultural scientist and director
- William Ivey (painter) (1919–1992), American Abstract Expressionist painter

== See also ==
- William Ivey Long (born 1947), American costume designer
