= Ivy Hall =

Ivy Hall can refer to:

- Edward C. Peters House, a historic Queen Anne style house in Atlanta, Georgia.
- Ivy Hall, a historic building in Princeton, New Jersey that was once home to Princeton University's short-lived law school.

== See also ==
- Ivey Hall
