= Llew Summers =

New Zealand sculptor (1947–2019)

- Born: Llewelyn Mark Summers; 21 July 1947; Christchurch, New Zealand
- Died: 1 August 2019 (aged 72); Mount Pleasant, Christchurch, New Zealand
- Known for: Sculpture
- Relatives: John Minto (brother-in-law)
- Website: llewsummers.co.nz

Llewelyn Mark Summers (21 July 1947 – 1 August 2019) was a New Zealand sculptor. He was based in Christchurch, and is known for his distinctive sculptures of the human form.

== Biography ==
Born in Christchurch on 21 July 1947, Summers was educated at Linwood High School from 1961 to 1963.

Summers began producing public sculptures after finishing a four-year farming apprenticeship in the early 1970, and gave his first exhibition in 1971. Since then he held many one-man shows as well as exhibiting alongside other artists including: Tony Fomison, Fatu Feu’u, Michael Smither, Tom Mutch, Peter Carson, Roger Hickin, Bing Dawe, and Graham Bennett.

He believed it is the role of the artist to challenge: "if it's not challenging, then, in some way, it's not new." His interest was primarily in figurative works, and was celebratory of the human form, affirming the beauty of the human body. However, following a formative and revelatory overseas trip his use of religious symbolism developed. It was first manifest through a series of icons and shrines comprising crosses, hearts and lights. Later, it led to a preoccupation with winged forms; most often, but not exclusively, attached to bodies. These angels were an obvious melding of the human and the divine; bringing an explicitly spiritual element to his work and highlighting the important role of morality, and the spiritual dimension of human existence.

What's important to me is to get a balance between the physical and the spiritual in life. We're given a soul and we're given a body. Sculpture is a nice balance because works can be made which are deep and meaningful, but they require your physical body to produce them. Works must have soul, rather than being merely clever or smart.

Summers regularly participated in outdoor sculpture shows such as those held at the Waitakaruru Arboretum and Sculpture Park, the Auckland Botanic Gardens, NZ Sculpture Onshore, Tai Tapu Sculpture Gardens, the NewDowse Gallery, Governors Bay, and Sculpture in Central Otago (Wānaka), as his larger works are ideal for garden and other outdoor settings. His large sculptures can be seen in public spaces in New Zealand, from Kaitaia to Wānaka and many localities in between. His work is held in private collections both within New Zealand and internationally.

His sculpture of 14 Stations of the Cross installed at the Cathedral of the Blessed Sacrament created a controversy due to the depiction of a naked figure of Jesus at his crucifixion.

Summers died at his home in the Christchurch suburb of Mount Pleasant on 1 August 2019.

A major book on his life and work, Llew Summers: body and soul, by John Newton, was published by Canterbury University Press, with support from Creative New Zealand, in July 2020.

== Gallery ==
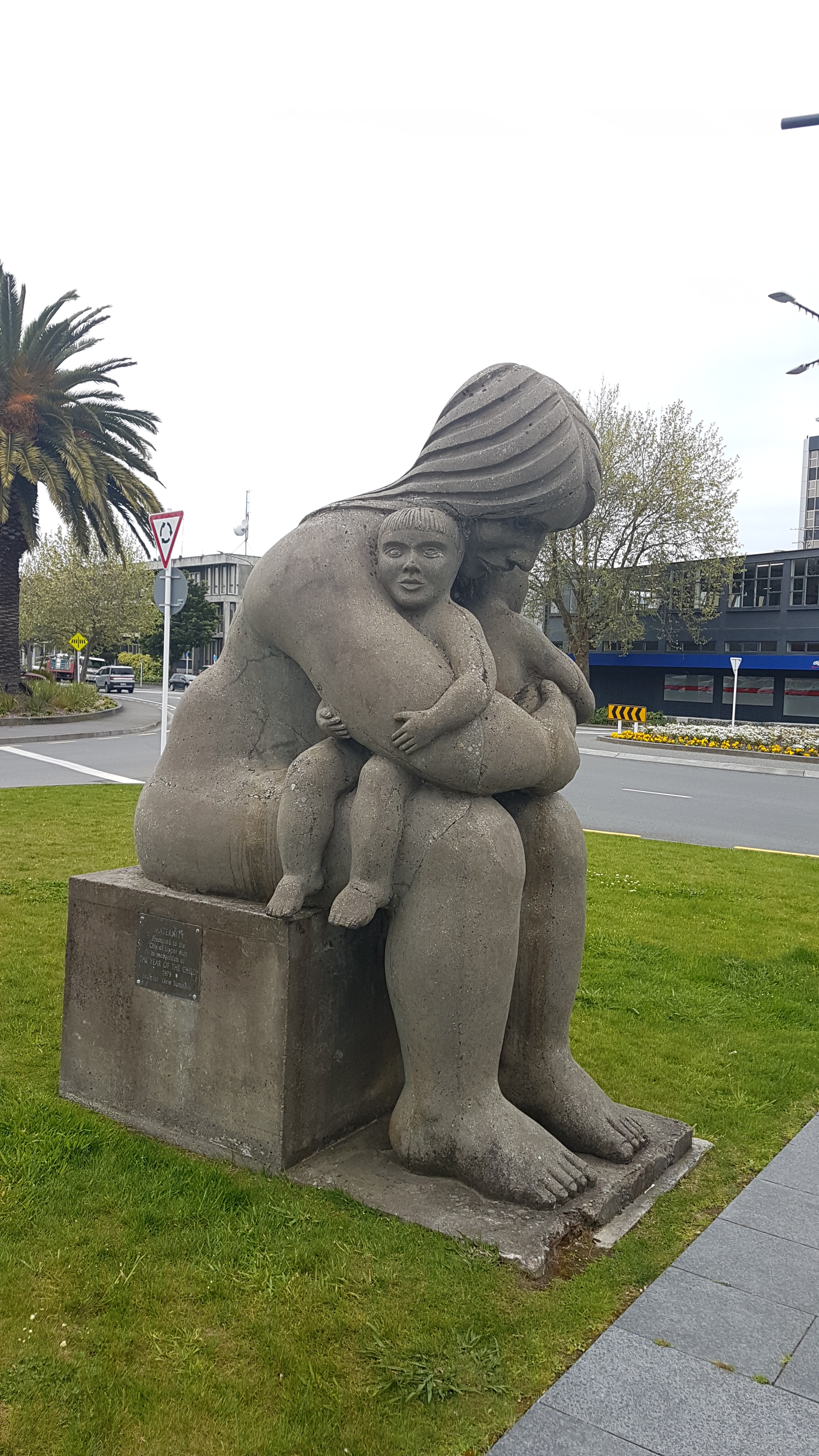
Maternity (1979), located in Upper Hutt

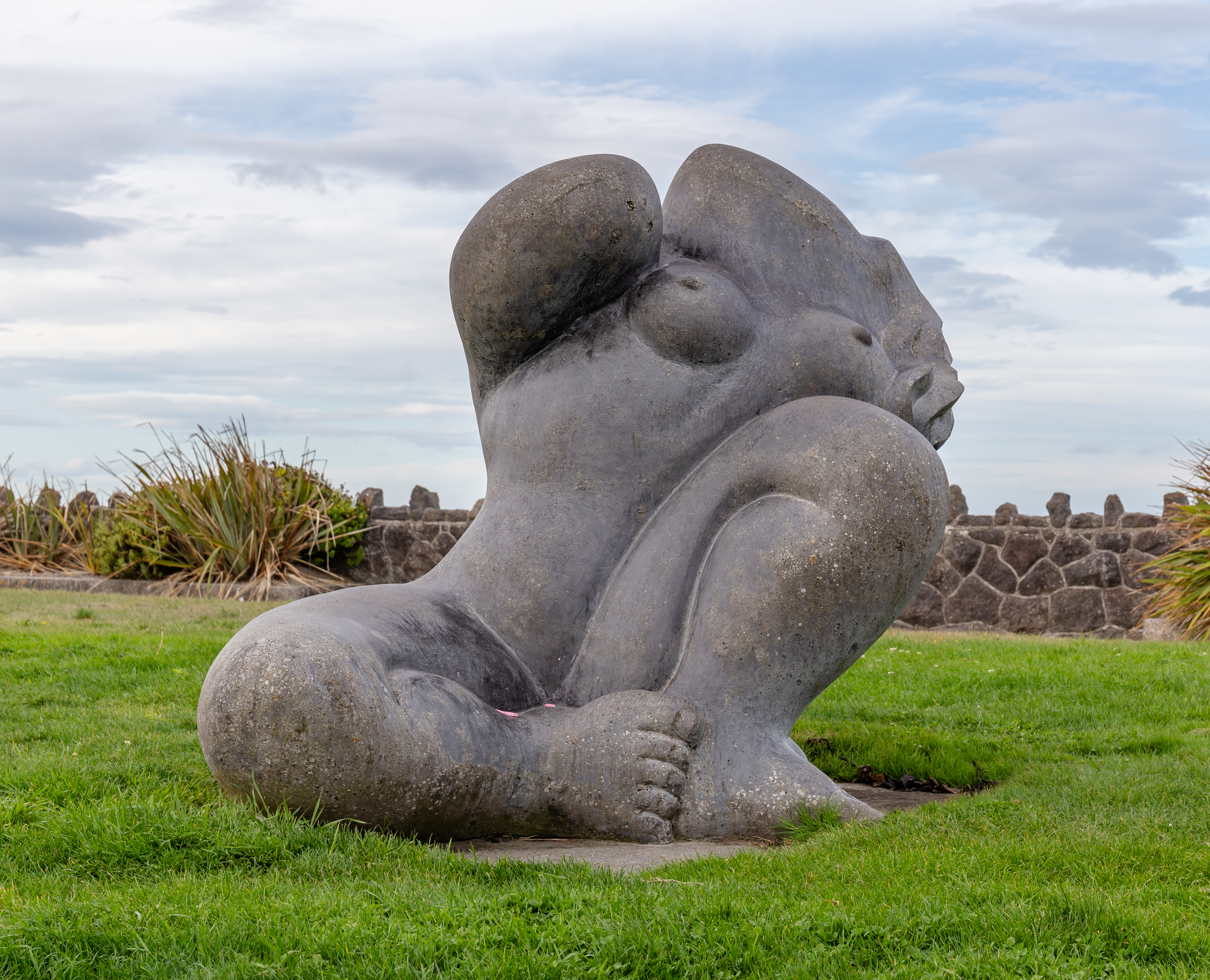
Moongazer (1988), located at New Brighton Beach, Christchurch

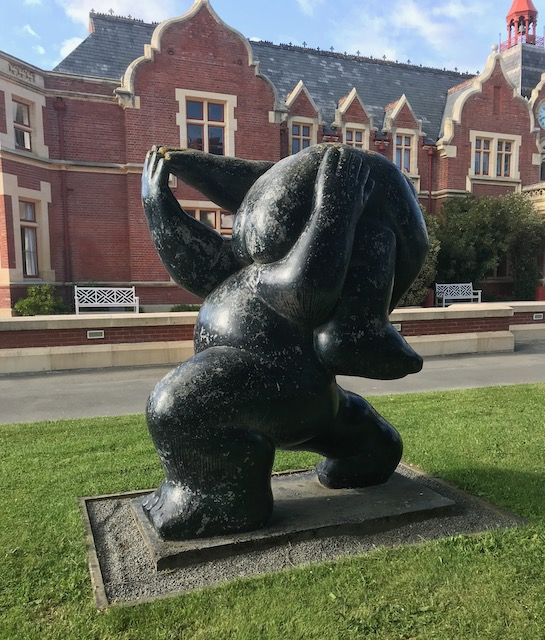
Joy of Living (1992), located at Lincoln University in Lincoln, New Zealand

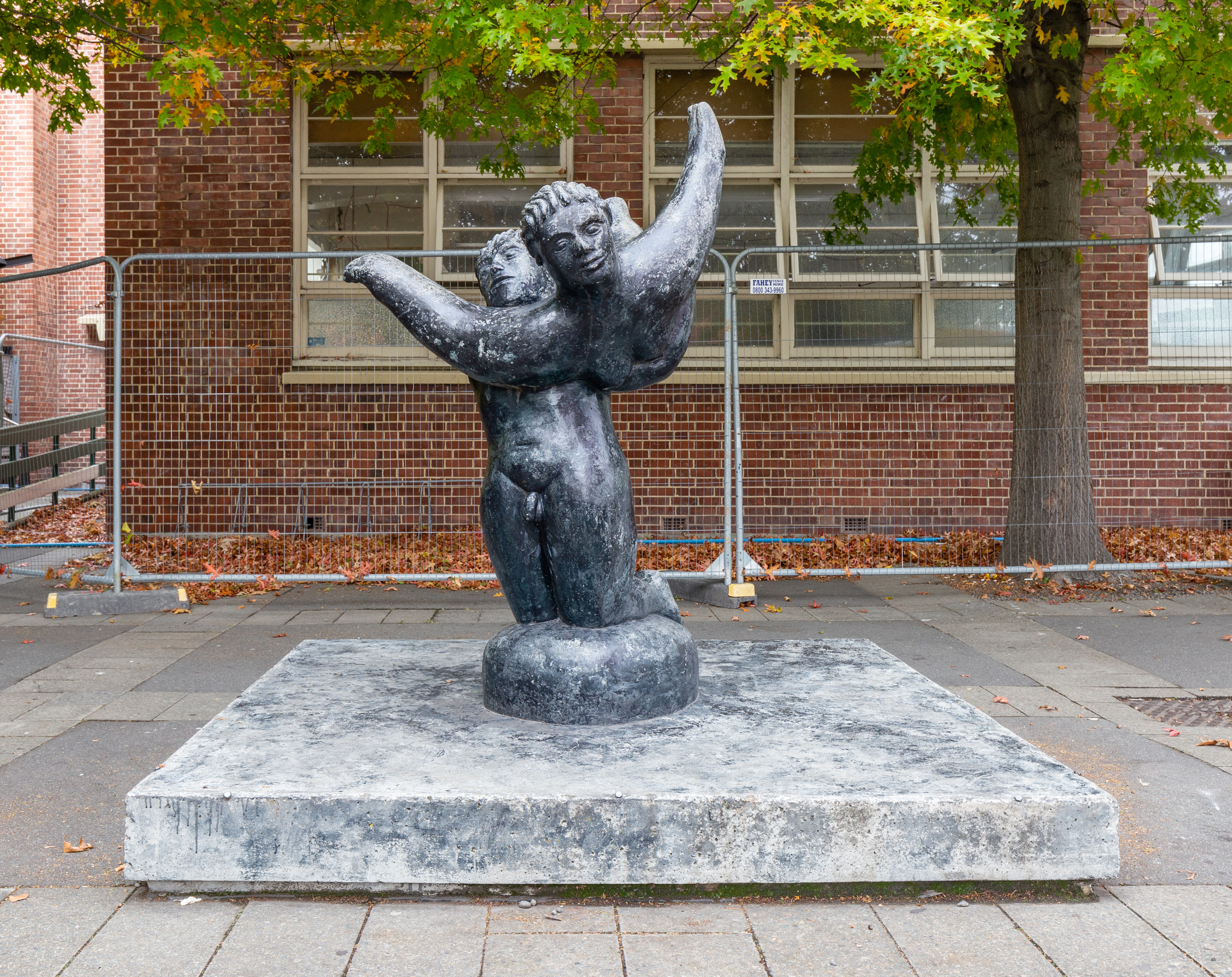
Fly Me to the Moon, located at the city campus of Ara Institute of Canterbury in Christchurch

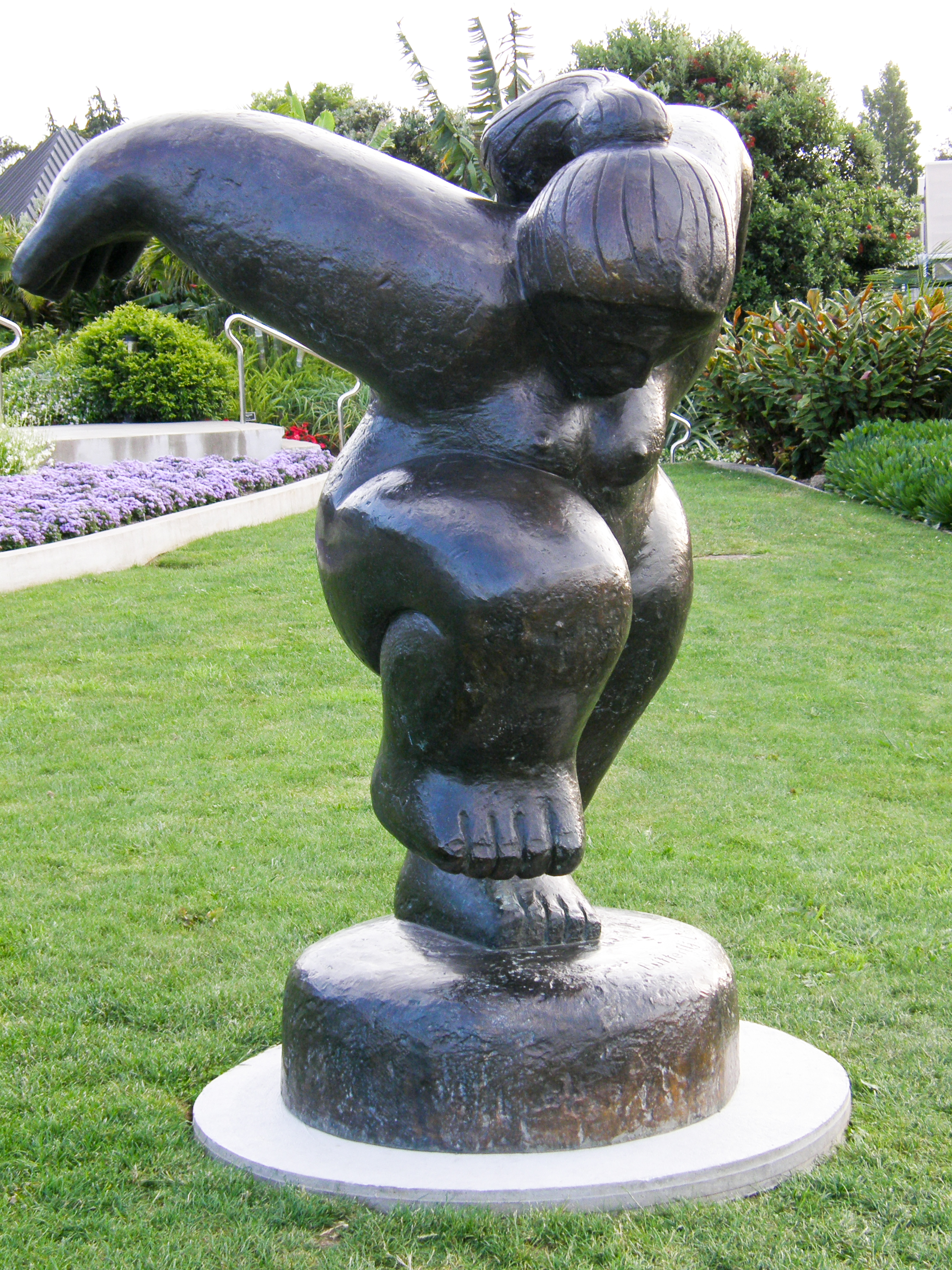
Butterfly (2007), located at the Auckland Botanic Gardens

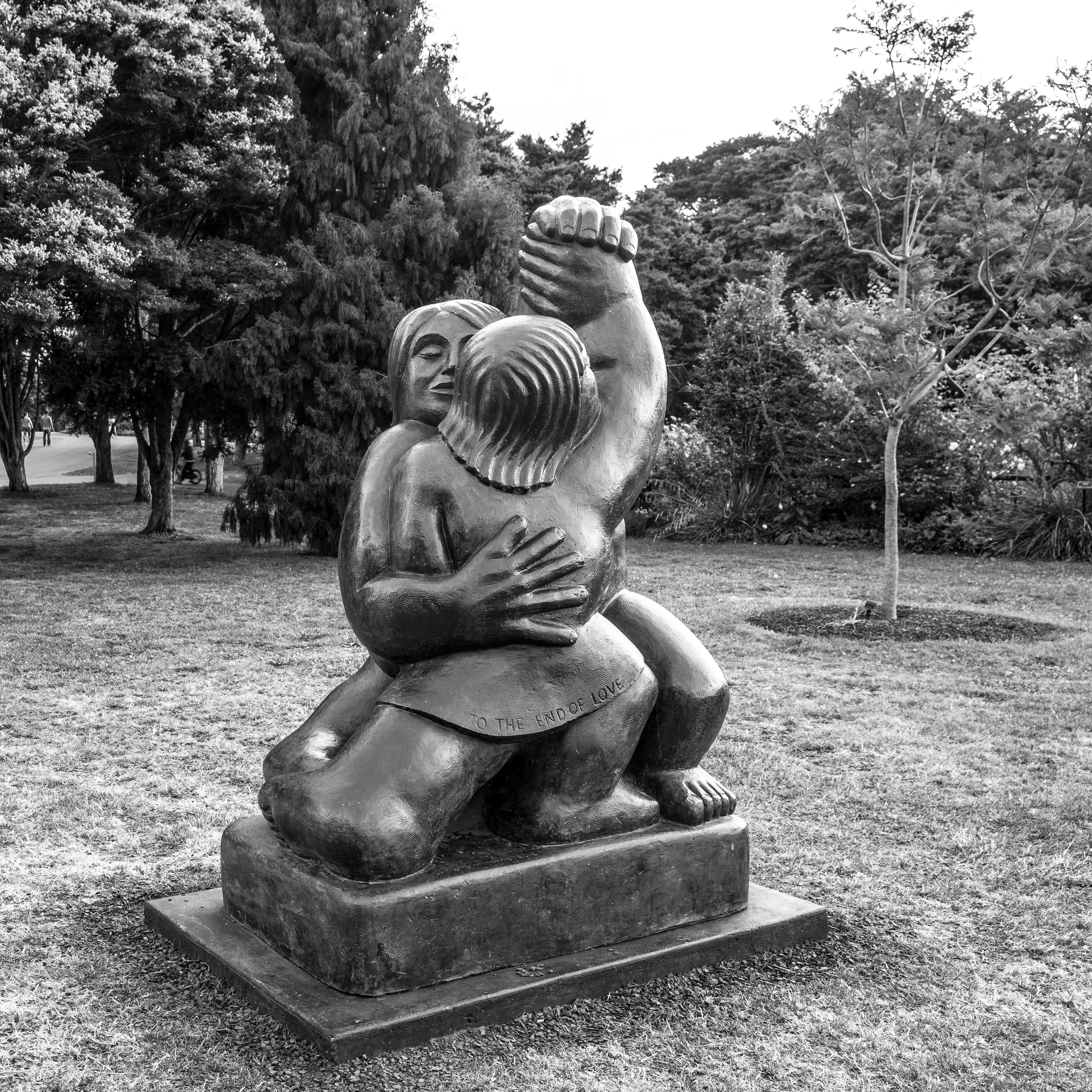
To the End of Love (2015), located at the Auckland Botanic Gardens

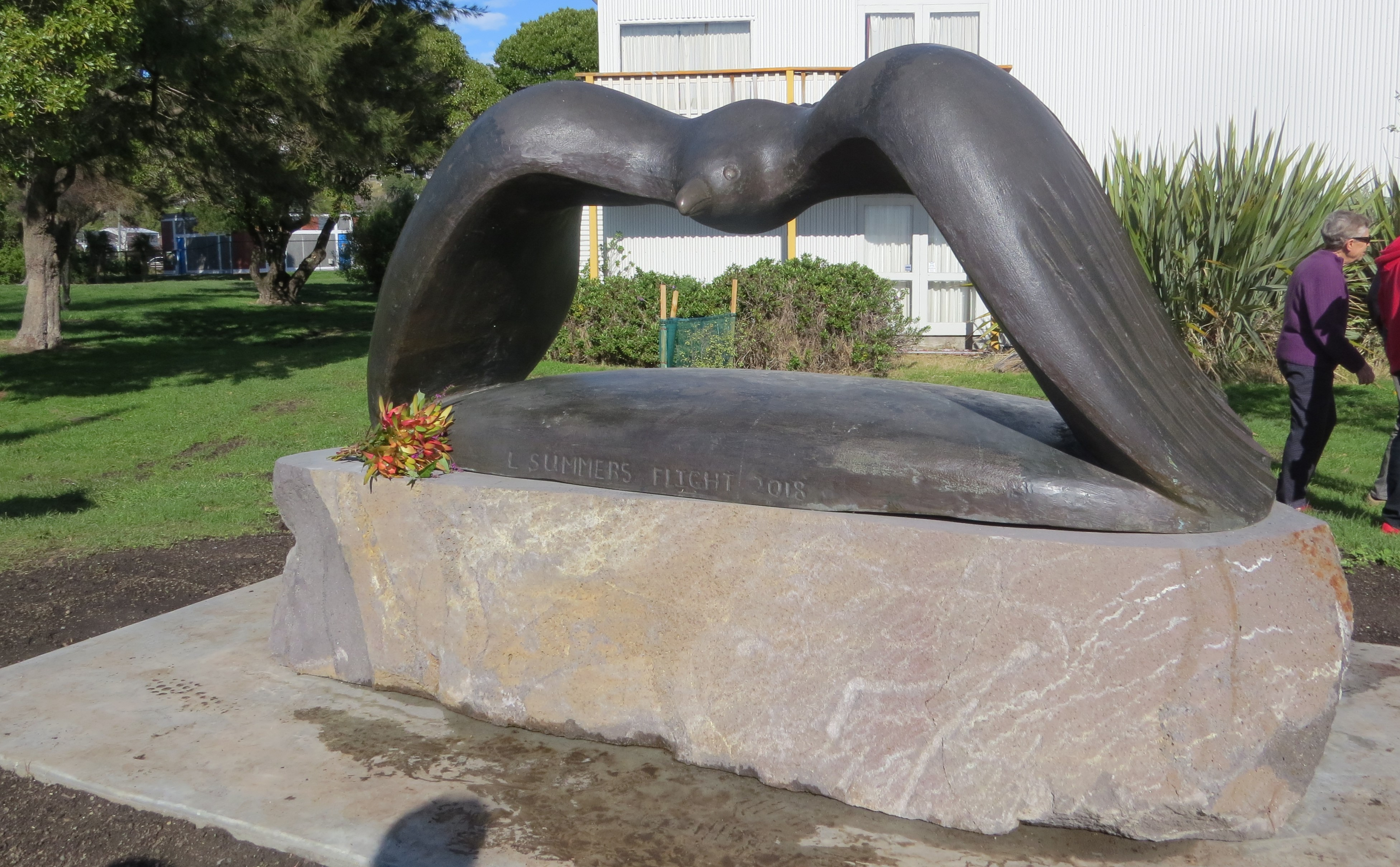
Flight (2018), installed on Sumner Causeway in 2023, as a permanent memorial to the sculptor. This work was stolen from the site in June 2025 and sold for scrap. Plans are underway for a replacement work.

== See also ==
- New Zealand art
