= Frederick Hilgendorf =

New Zealand teacher, lecturer and agricultural scientist

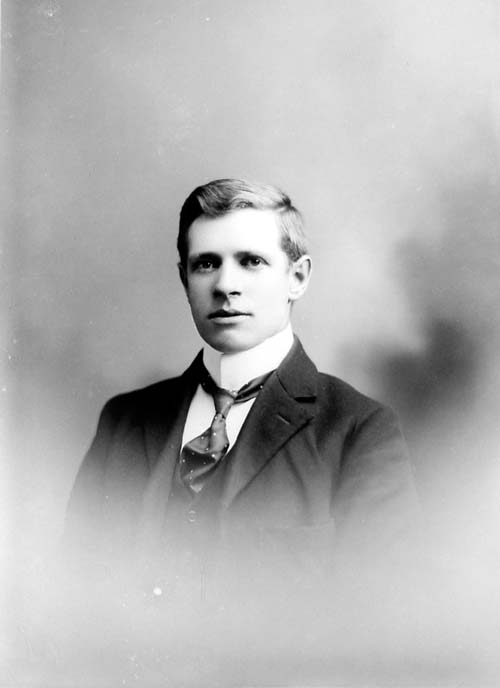
Hilgendorf (year unknown)

Frederick William Hilgendorf (23 January 1874 – 24 September 1942) was a New Zealand teacher, lecturer and agricultural scientist at Canterbury Agricultural College (now Lincoln University). He was born in Waihola, New Zealand, on 23 January 1874.

Hilgendorf was appointed as a professor of the University of New Zealand in 1930. He joined the university's academic board in 1933.

In 1935, he was awarded the King George V Silver Jubilee Medal. The Hilgendorf Wing at Lincoln University was named after him.
