= Roger Field (plant scientist) =

New Zealand plant scientist (born 1946)

Roger Field ONZM
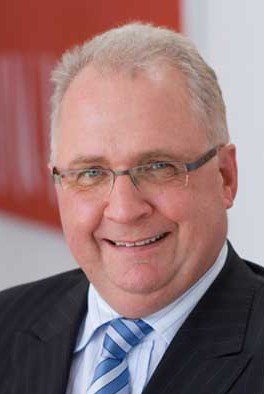
- Field in 2012
- Born: Roger John Field; 5 July 1946 (age 80); Birmingham, England
- Education: University of Hull
- Scientific career
- Fields: Plant science
- Workplaces: Lincoln University
- Thesis: The movement of plant growth regulators and herbicides (1970)
- Doctoral advisor

Vice-Chancellor of Lincoln University
- In office 2004–2012
- Preceded by: Frank Wood
- Succeeded by: Andrew West

Roger John Field ONZM (born 5 July 1946) is a retired New Zealand plant scientist and university administrator. He served as the vice-chancellor of Lincoln University from 2004 to 2012.

== Career ==
Born in Birmingham, England, on 5 July 1946, Field completed a joint honours degree in botany and zoology at the University of Hull, and a PhD in plant science, also at Hull. The title of his doctoral thesis was The movement of plant growth regulators and herbicides.

Field was appointed as a lecturer in plant science at Lincoln College (now Lincoln University) in 1970, and became a naturalised New Zealand citizen in 1977. He rose to become professor of plant science in 1986. In April 2004, he was appointed vice-chancellor, retiring in 2012. He was Lincoln University’s third vice-chancellor and the 10th head of the institution since it was founded in 1878. He also served as the chair of the New Zealand Vice-Chancellors’ Committee, and was a council member of the Association of Commonwealth Universities.

== Honours ==
In the 2013 New Year Honours, Field was appointed an Officer of the New Zealand Order of Merit, for services to education and land-based industries.
