= Bianca van Rangelrooy =

New Zealand artist

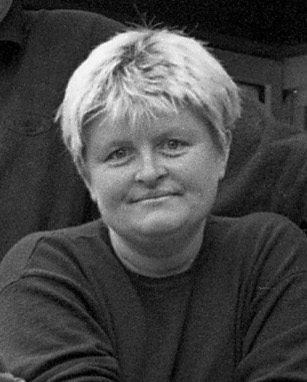
Van Rangelrooy in 1994

Bianca van Rangelrooy (born April 1959) is a New Zealand artist.

== Life ==
Van Rangelrooy was born in Wellington, New Zealand and received her BFA from the University of Canterbury. She is known for her public art in government buildings in New Zealand. Van Rangelrooy also works in environmental art, drawing, painting, sculpture and digital photography. She currently lectures(2011) in landscape architecture at Lincoln University in Christchurch.

Notable works include Merger, which is located in the Courts Building in Christchurch.
