= Cheryl Lucas =

New Zealand ceramicist (born 1954)

- Born: 1954 (age 71–72); Tarras, Central Otago, New Zealand
- Known for: Ceramics art
- Spouse: Peter Rough
- Awards: Arts Foundation of New Zealand Laureate Award; 2025

Cheryl Lucas (born 1954) is a New Zealand ceramics artist. In 2025 she received an Arts Foundation of New Zealand Laureate Award in recognition of her contributions to New Zealand arts and culture.

== Early life and education ==
Lucas was born in 1954 in Tarras, Central Otago. She became interested in ceramics as an art form as a child, after encountering ceramic shards left in the Bendigo area by Otago Gold Rush miners.

Lucas holds a diploma in fine and applied art with distinction in graphics from the Otago School of Art (1975) and a post-graduate diploma in advanced printmaking (lithography) from the Wimbledon College of Arts in London (1979). She returned to New Zealand soon after completing her diploma, and since 1987 she and her husband, landscape architect Peter Rough, have been based in Lyttelton.

== Career ==
Lucas' sculpture Jug-Skin Fence (2019) outside the Stewart Building, Lincoln University

Lucas began making vessels and sculptures out of clay in the early 1980s, inspired by a 1981 exhibition of contemporary British ceramics at the Robert McDougall Art Gallery. She taught ceramics and drawing at the Ara Institute of Canterbury for many years, until she retired to focus on making art full-time in the mid-2000s. Around this time, she began creating more installations and larger works.

In 2011 Lucas received the premier award at the Sculpture on the Peninsula exhibition for her Harder Larder installation. This installation, which Lucas describes as featuring glazed ceramic "bladders and weird-looking things", addressed themes of globalisation and excess consumption. Around the same time, she began creating chimney pots to replace those lost in the Christchurch earthquakes; she created at least 40, including for Christ's College, Riccarton House and the Sign of the Takahe.

In 2017 Lucas received a Merit Award at the Portage Ceramic Awards for her work Milkstock. In the same year, she became a member of the International Academy of Ceramics. In 2019 she received a Craft/Object Fellowship worth NZ$100,000 from Creative New Zealand.

Her 2021 series Subterfuge was inspired by New Zealand's unique plant life and by the closure of the country's borders during the COVID-19 pandemic. In 2022, the Christchurch Art Gallery hosted a solo exhibition of her work titled Shaped by Schist and Scoria.

In 2025 Lucas received an Arts Foundation of New Zealand Laureate Award, which includes a NZ$50,000 grant in recognition of her contributions to New Zealand culture. The judges said she "pushed ceramics beyond category – transforming the vessel into sculpture, social commentary, and even earthquake recovery".

Lucas's work is held in a number of museum and art gallery collections, including Te Papa, the Christchurch Art Gallery, the Canterbury Museum, the Arts House Trust, the Argentona Water Jug Museum, FLICAM, Lincoln University and the Ara Institute. She has held artist residencies at FLICAM in Shaanxi, China (2007) and at Sturt in Mittagong, Australia (2013).
