= Robin Pollard =

New Zealand academic

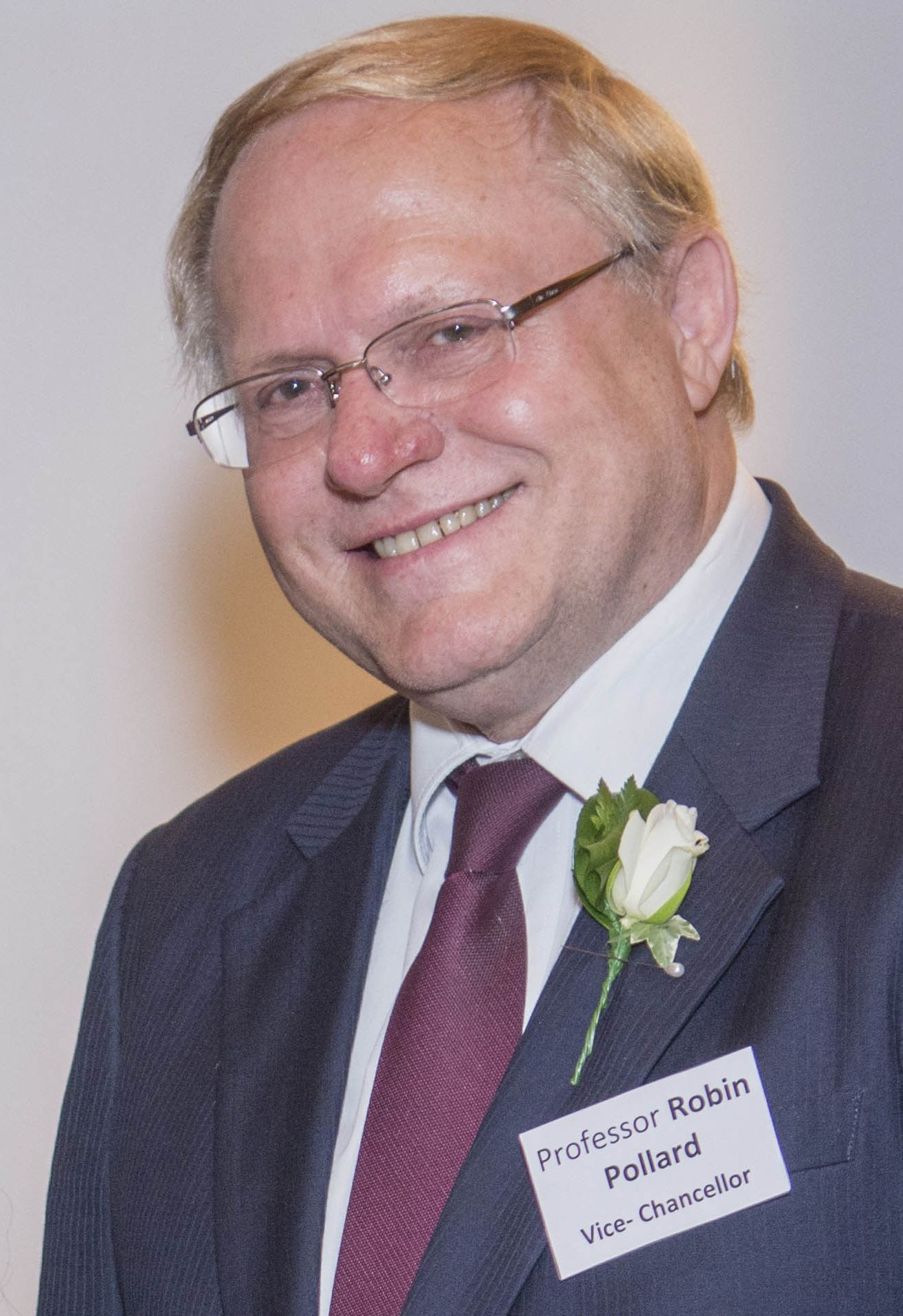
- Pollard in 2016

Vice-Chancellor of Lincoln University
- In office February 2016 – March 2018
- Preceded by: Andrew West
- Succeeded by: James McWha

Personal details
- Born: Christchurch, New Zealand
- Education: University of Canterbury

Professor Robin Pollard is a New Zealand academic who has spent much of his career working in Australia and Malaysia. He was the Vice-Chancellor at Lincoln University (New Zealand) near his home town of Christchurch, New Zealand until March 2018. Previous positions include Deputy Vice-Chancellor at Central Lancashire University and Pro Vice-Chancellor and President of Monash University Malaysia Campus.

Professor Pollard's background is in condensed matter physics, and his doctoral thesis was on Mössbauer spectroscopy. He has also held academic posts in information technology, marketing and chemistry. He has taught at universities in Australia, Malaysia, New Zealand, Canada, the United States of America and the United Kingdom.

He was part of the first cohort of professors to teach at Monash Malaysia upon its formal opening in 1998, serving as the Foundation Professor and Head of the School of Business and Information Technology.
