= Andy West (biologist) =

New Zealand academic

Andrew West CRSNZ
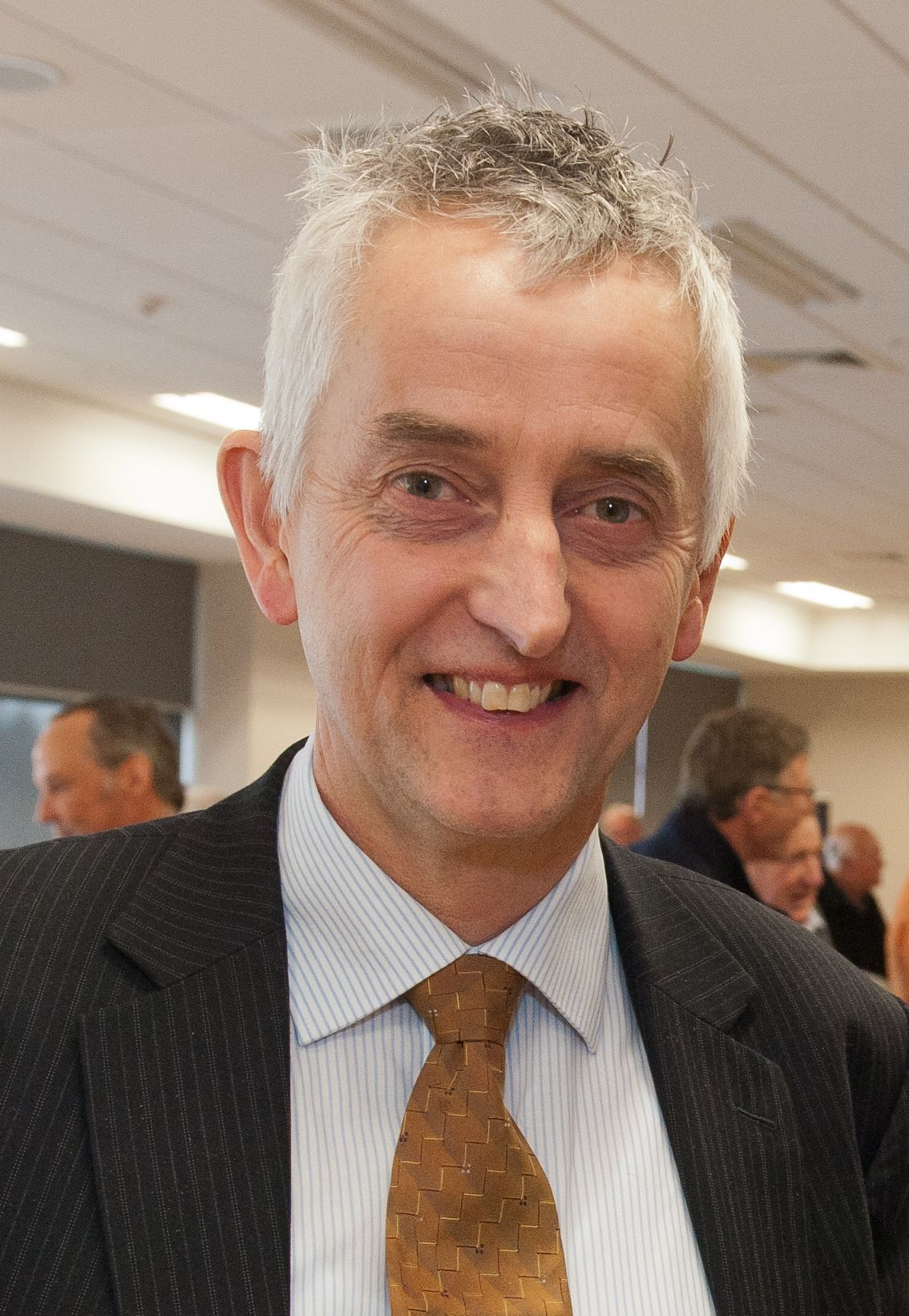
- Andrew West in 2013

Vice-Chancellor of Lincoln University
- In office 2012–2015
- Preceded by: Roger Field
- Succeeded by: Robin Pollard

Personal details
- Born: England
- Education: University of Westminster

Andrew West CRSNZ was the Vice Chancellor of Lincoln University, New Zealand from 2012 to June 2015.

West holds a degree in ecology at the University of Westminster, and has a PhD from the Council for National Academic Awards. Prior to becoming Vice-Chancellor at Lincoln, West was the Chief Executive at GNS Science and Chief Executive at AgResearch. He also had leading positions at the Tertiary Education Commission and the New Zealand Qualifications Authority. He is a Companion of the Royal Society Te Apārangi.
