= William Ivey (agricultural scientist) =

New Zealand agricultural scientist and director

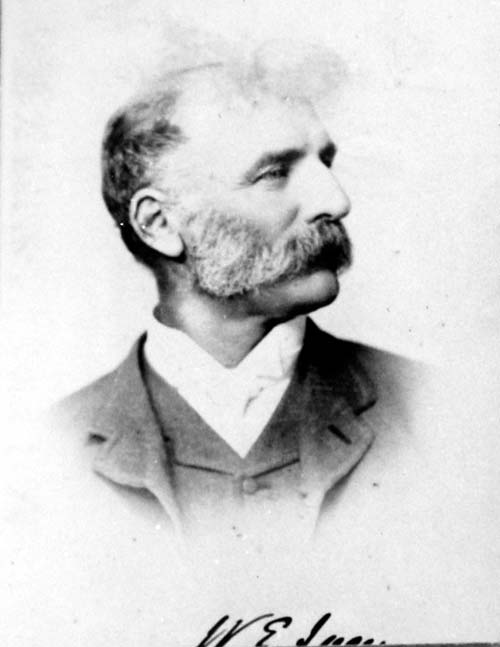
Ivey in 1886

William Edward Ivey (26 August 1838 – 13 April 1892) was a New Zealand agricultural scientist and director. He was the inaugural head of what is now Lincoln University.

== Early life ==
Ivey was born in Hobart, Tasmania, Australia on 26 August 1838. He was the son of William Edward Ivey, a clerk and landowner, and Elizabeth Ivey (née Davis). He received his education in England and attended the Royal Agricultural College at Cirencester. He managed a farm in England for a while before he came to New Zealand in 1867, where he took up land. Because of the ongoing New Zealand Wars, he almost immediately moved on to Australia. He spent four years at the Department of Agriculture in Victoria as a chemist before he became superintendent in charge of experimental fields. He gained a high standing as a chemist and became a fellow of the Royal Institute of Chemistry, and a fellow of the Chemical Society.

On 20 September 1873, Ivey married Sophia Minna Palmer (1845–1914) at Sydney. She was the granddaughter of George Thomas Palmer, after whom Palmerston in Canberra is named. They were to have two children.

== Life in New Zealand ==
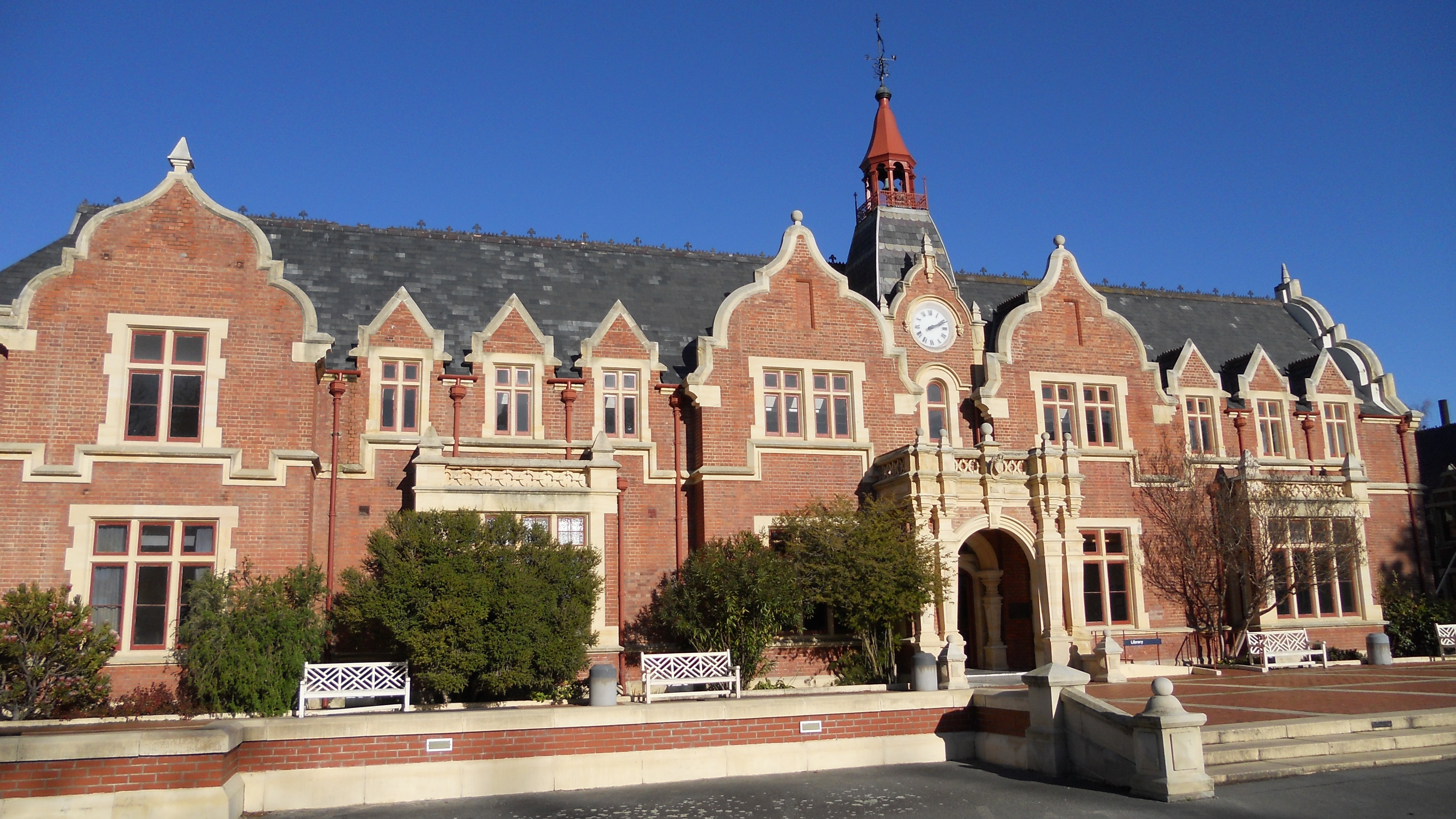
Ivey Hall in July 2011

Ivey was one of two Melbourne applicants for a position as director of a new school of agriculture, attached to Canterbury College. Samuel Dening Glyde, who had previously lived in Canterbury, but was now resident in Adelaide, travelled to Melbourne and interviewed both applicants. Both men were qualified, and the other applicant had "greater scientific attainment", but Glyde recommended Ivey for the position, who was appointed on 28 March 1878. Ivey and his wife arrived at Lincoln in April 1878; his starting salary was NZ£600. They lived in a small cottage while the main college building was under construction, which had a residential quarter for them.

Ivey set to work, and he was fully aware of the pioneering role that he held. The school that became popularly known as Lincoln College was the first agricultural school in the Southern Hemisphere, and the third in the Commonwealth. He placed a focus on scientific education and was not interested in turning out agricultural labourers. His students were much more interested in learning practical skills, but Ivey gained their admiration and respect. The job was too much for a single person, though, and Ivey was overworked. His health suffered, and on 13 April 1892, he collapsed in the college's driveway and died. He was buried in Springston Cemetery; he was survived by his wife and his two children.

In 1954, the main college building was renamed Ivey Hall in commemoration of the organisation's first director. On 1 September 1983, the building was registered by Heritage New Zealand as a Category I heritage structure.
