= Ivey Hall =

Historic building in New Zealand

Coordinates: 43°38′38.37″S 172°28′5.22″E

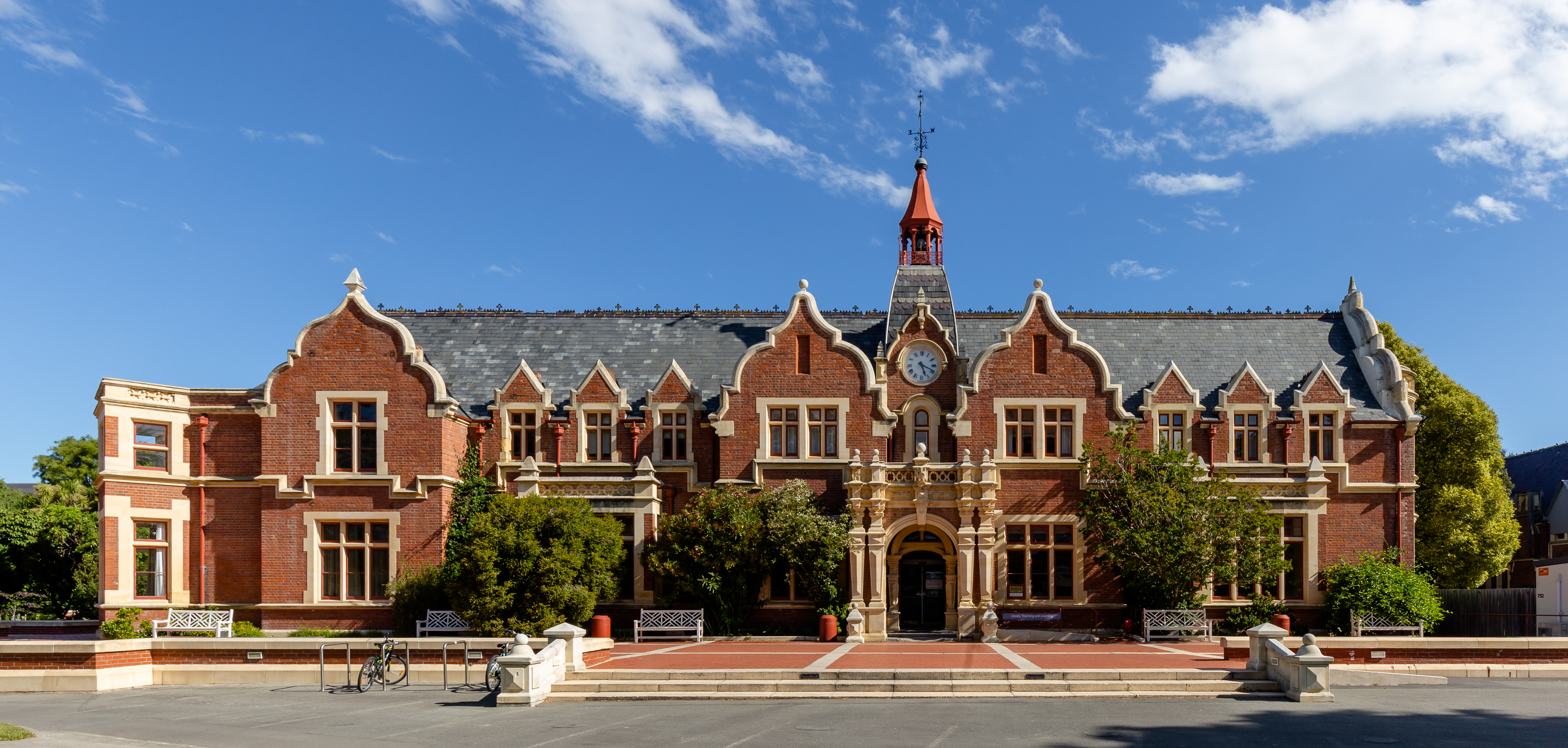
- Interactive map of the Ivey Hall area

General information
- Architectural style: Jacobethan
- Location: Lincoln, New Zealand, 85 Ellesmere Junction Road and 1467 Springs Road, Lincoln University
- Year built: 1878-1880
- Owner: Lincoln University

Design and construction
- Architect: Frederick Strouts

Ivey Hall is a historic building on the campus of Lincoln University in New Zealand. It is registered as a Category I structure by Heritage New Zealand.

== History ==
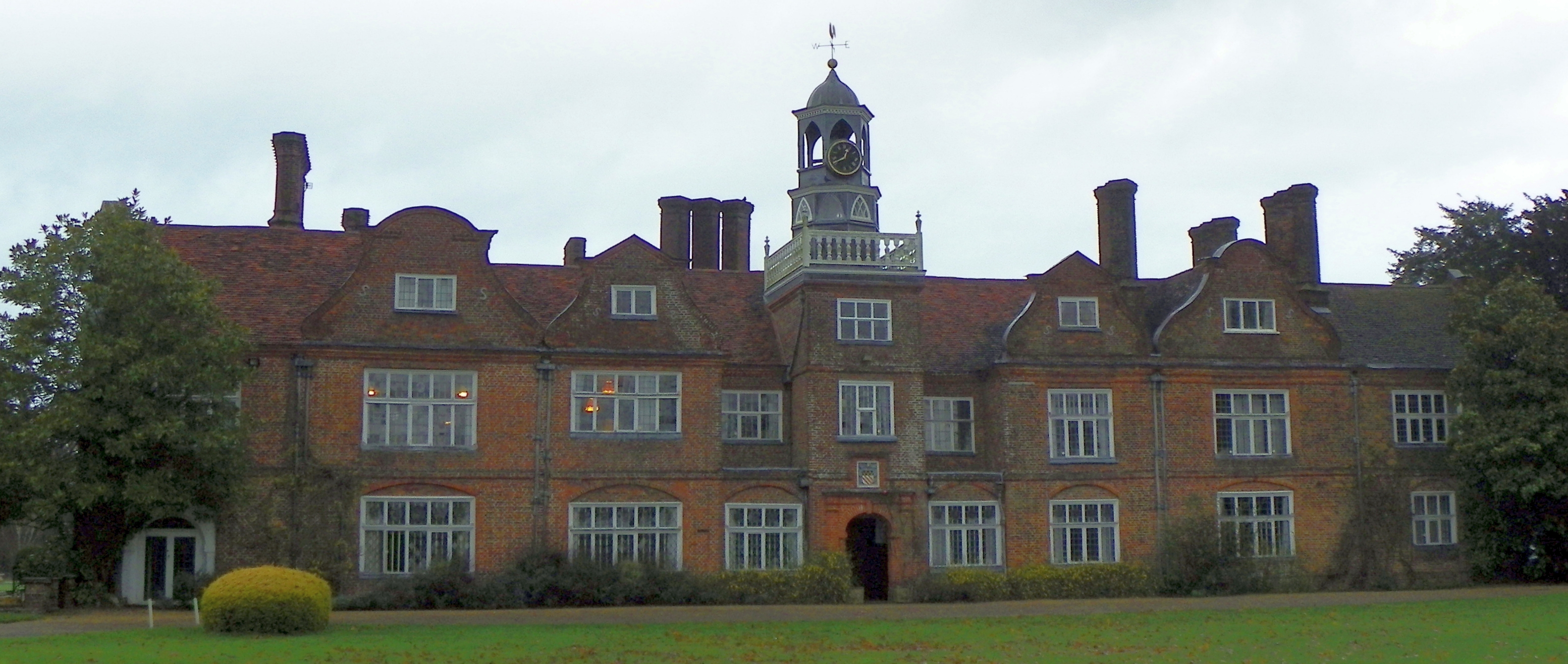
The design of Ivey Hall was modelled after Rothamsted Manor in Hertfordshire.

The building was designed by Frederick Strouts and built between 1878 and 1880. Strouts modelled the design on Rothamsted Manor in Hertfordshire. In 1881 a west wing was added onto the building to provide student accommodation, with the 1881 extension designed by Strouts. Later on, the building became the university's library. In 1954, it was named after William Ivey (1838–1892), the inaugural head of the teaching institution. It is one of the earliest large buildings built in permanent materials in Canterbury and the earliest large structure in New Zealand of Jacobethan architecture still in existence. The west wing was extended in 1918 with John Guthrie as architect.

In 1923 an eastern extension known as the Memorial Hall was designed by Cecil Wood, a pupil of Strouts. Memorial Hall was constructed in memory of students and staff of Lincoln University who died during the First World War, but later came to include servicemen from the South African War and the Second World War. The hall was where the Lincoln Agreement, which ended the Bougainville conflict, was signed.

Ivey Hall is registered by Heritage New Zealand as a Category I building with registration number 273. It was originally classified as B. Ivey Hall was seismically strengthened in the 1980s, resulting in the building not receiving serious damage during the 2010 Canterbury and 2011 Christchurch earthquakes, although some gables collapsed and some masonry was damaged. Seismic strengthening work was undertaken as part of a restoration of the building carried out in June 2022. Ivey Hall reopened in February 2025.
