= Lincoln University (New Zealand) =

New Zealand university

Coordinates: 43°38′40″S 172°28′07″E

- Te Whare Wānaka O Aoraki (Māori)
- Former name: Canterbury Agricultural College
- Motto: Scientia et industria cum probitate (Latin)
- Motto in English: Science and industry with integrity
- Type: Public agricultural research university
- Established: 1878; 1990 (university status)
- Endowment: NZ$707,000 (31 December 2021)
- Chancellor: Bruce Gemmell
- Vice-Chancellor: Grant Edwards
- Academic staff: 191 (EFTE, 2023)
- Administrative staff: 252 (EFTE, 2023)
- Total staff: 576 (EFTE, 2023)
- Students: 3,123 (EFTS, 2023)
- Undergraduates: 1,479 (EFTS, 2023)
- Postgraduates: 1,346 (EFTS, 2023)
- Doctoral students: 167 (EFTS, 2023)
- Location: Lincoln, Canterbury, New Zealand
- Campus: University town 58 ha (143 acres)
- Website: www.lincoln.ac.nz

Lincoln University (Māori: Te Whare Wānaka o Aoraki) is a public university in New Zealand that was formed in 1990 when Lincoln College, Canterbury was made independent of the University of Canterbury. Founded in 1878, it is the oldest agricultural teaching institution in the Southern Hemisphere. It remains the smallest university in New Zealand (by enrolment) and one of the eight public universities. The campus is situated on 50 ha (120 acres) of land located about 15 km (9 mi) outside the city of Christchurch, in Lincoln, Canterbury.

In 2018 Lincoln University had 2695 Equivalent Full Time Students (EFTS) and 633 full-time equivalent staff (188 Academic, 135 Administration and Support, 65 Research and Technical, 273 Farms and Operational).

Lincoln University is a member of the Euroleague for Life Sciences.

== History ==
=== School of Agriculture of Canterbury University College ===
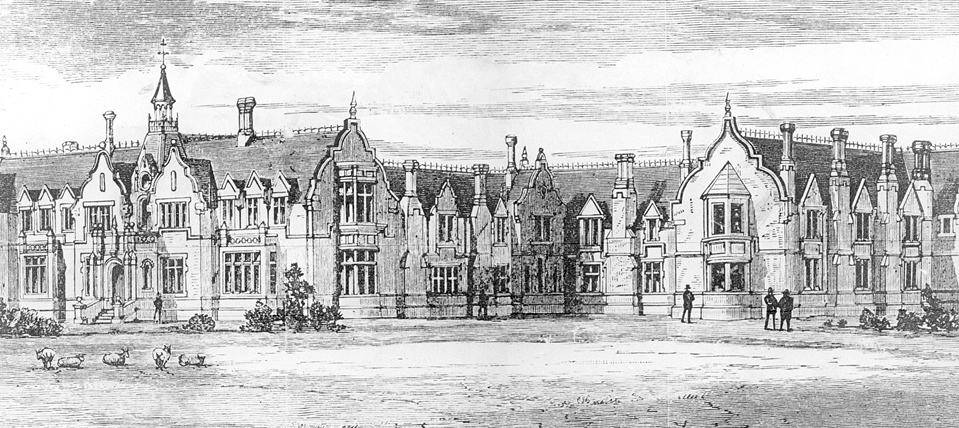
The Lincoln School of Agriculture in 1881

Lincoln University established itself in 1878 as the School of Agriculture of Canterbury University College, opening in July 1880. By 1885 it had 56 students, 32 of them in residence, and all classes were held in the main building (later known as Ivey Hall). The teaching staff included the head of the school William Ivey (who taught agriculture), George Gray (Chemistry and Physics), who remained on staff until 1915, Eric Manley Clarke (mathematics, surveying, and book-keeping; son of the English geodesist Alexander Ross Clarke), and part-time lecturer Thomas Hill (Veterinary Science).

The 660 acres (270 ha) college farm was worked by the students, who took part in ploughing, milking, and stock management, as well as taking lectures on agricultural science and chemistry.

=== Canterbury Agricultural College ===
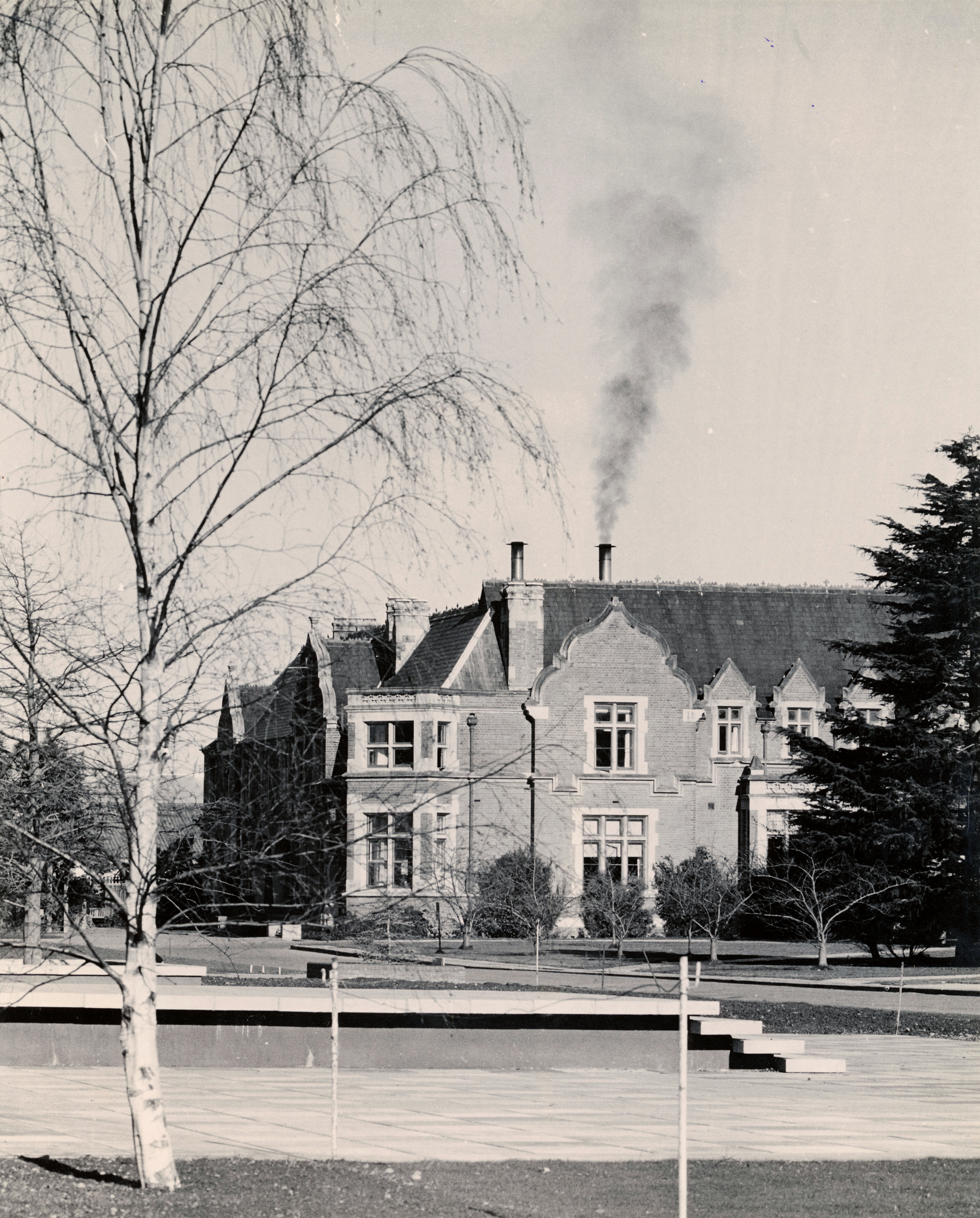
Ivey Hall in 1968

From 1896 to 1961, it served students under the name Canterbury Agricultural College, and offered qualifications of the University of New Zealand until that institution's demise.

=== Lincoln University ===
From 1961 to 1990, it was known as Lincoln College, a constituent college of the University of Canterbury, until achieving autonomy in 1990 as Lincoln University. It is the oldest agricultural teaching institution in the Southern Hemisphere. It remains the smallest university in New Zealand.

In March 2009, the Crown Research Institute AgResearch announced that it planned to merge with Lincoln University. However, Lincoln University rejected the plan later that year over financial concerns.

On 18 November 2010, after a period of consultation, it was confirmed that a merger between Lincoln University and Telford Rural Polytechnic would go ahead, with the merger taking effect on 1 January 2011.

On 18 June 2013, a new blueprint for the Selwyn campus was announced which included the "Lincoln Hub" concept previously announced by the Government on 29 April 2013.

== Campuses and facilities ==
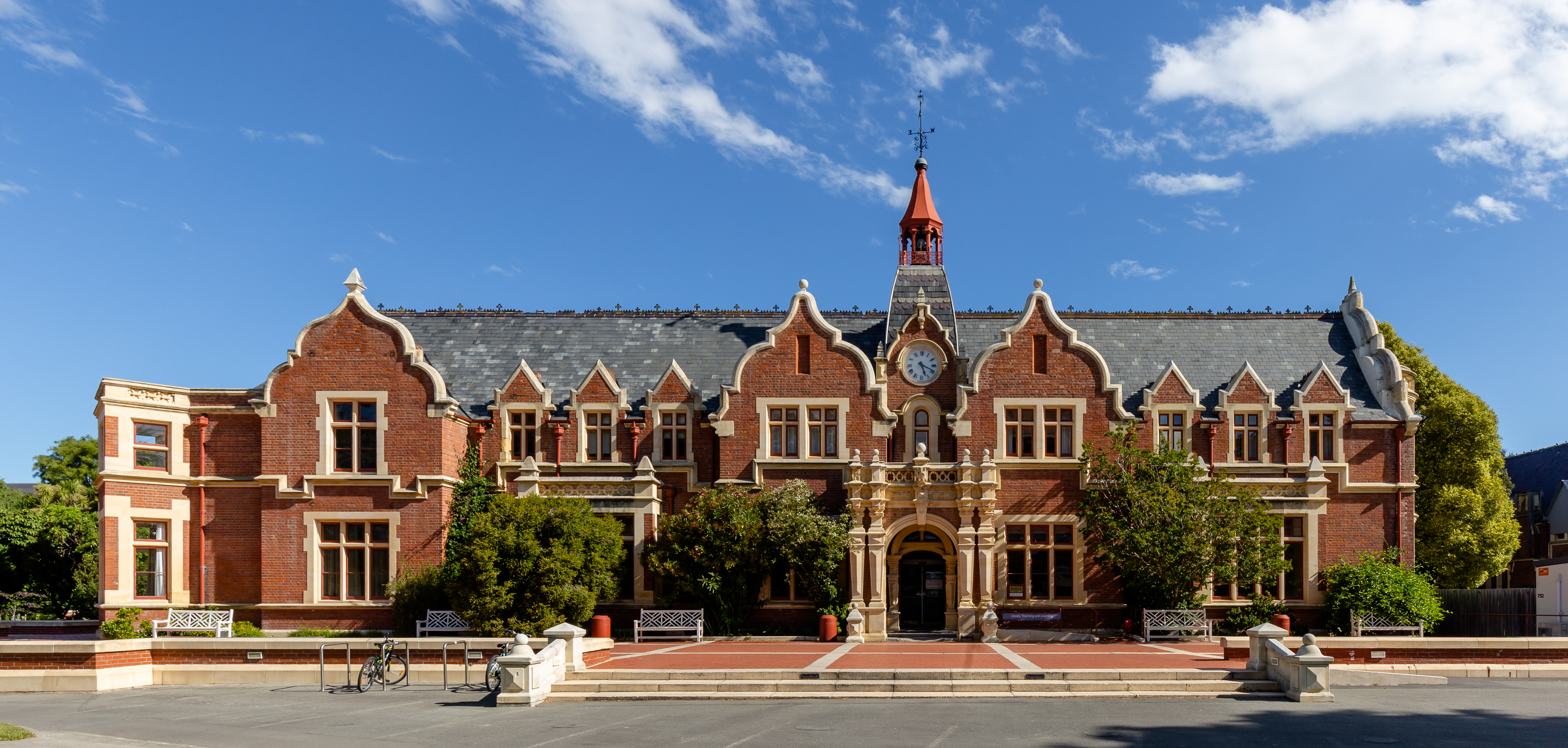
Ivey Hall, which is a heritage site

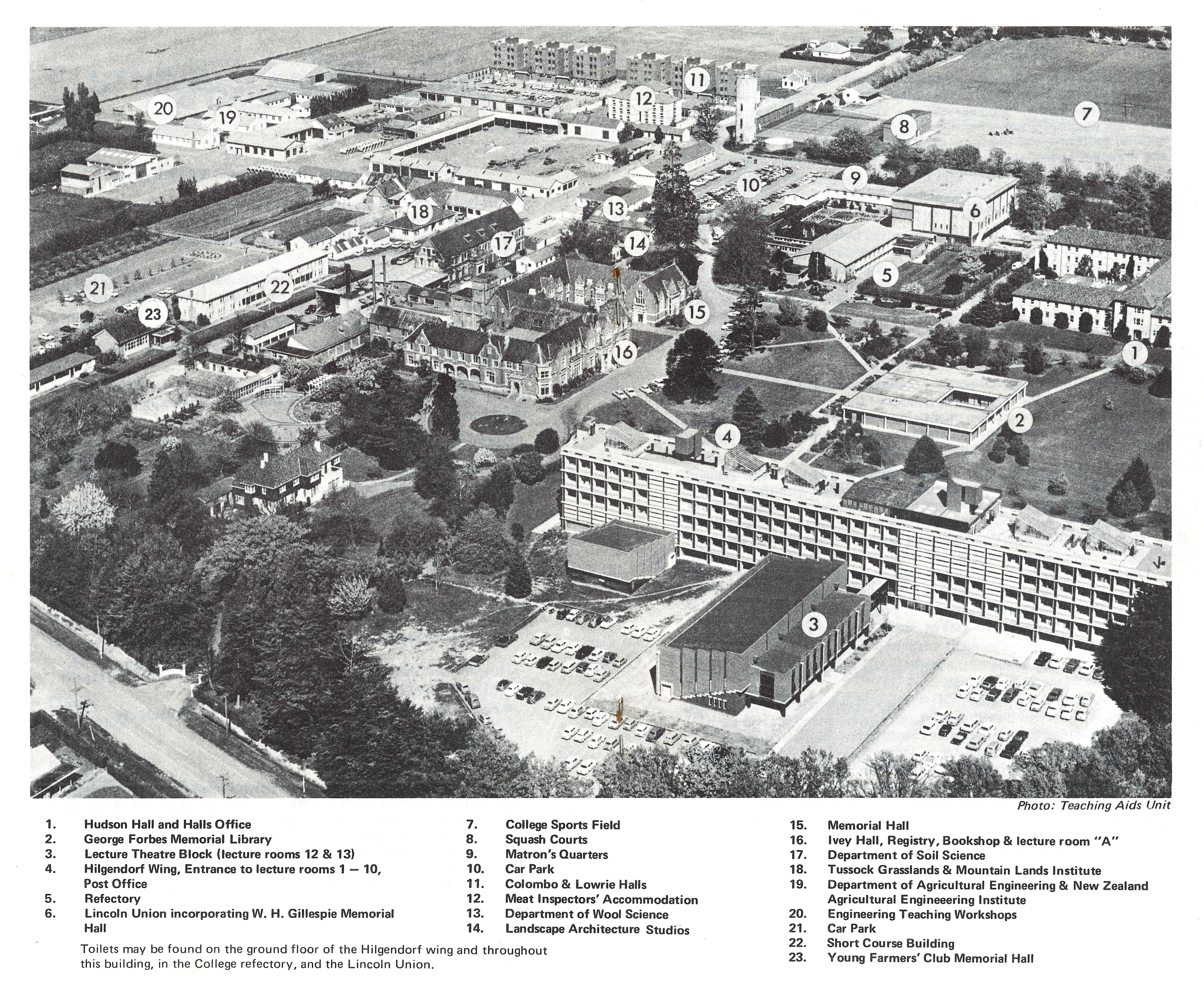
1972 Lincoln College campus map

- The oldest building on campus is Ivey Hall, built in 1878 as the main teaching, administration, and residential building. It was designed in the Jacobethan style by Christchurch architect Frederick Strouts. As well as lecture theatres, laboratories, and a museum, the College Director William Ivey, his family, and the students resided here. A "West Wing" was added in 1881 for additional student accommodation and study rooms (West Ivey was damaged in the 2010 Canterbury earthquake and reopened in 2025). Extensively remodelled and expanded in 1989, Ivey Hall now houses the George Forbes Memorial Library.
- Memorial Hall, designed by Cecil Wood, was built in 1923–24 to commemorate the loss of former Lincoln students who died in World War I; two thirds of the costs were raised by the Old Boy's Students' Association. It later commemorated the dead of World War II. Extensively damaged along with Ivey West in the 2010 Canterbury earthquake, it was formally reopened in 2025.
- The Laboratories were built in 1929, and became the McCaskill Building, before being replaced by the School of Landscape Architecture Building in 2009.
- The Lodge, a residence for the College Principal, was built in 1945. Until this time the Principal and his family had lived in Ivey Hall.

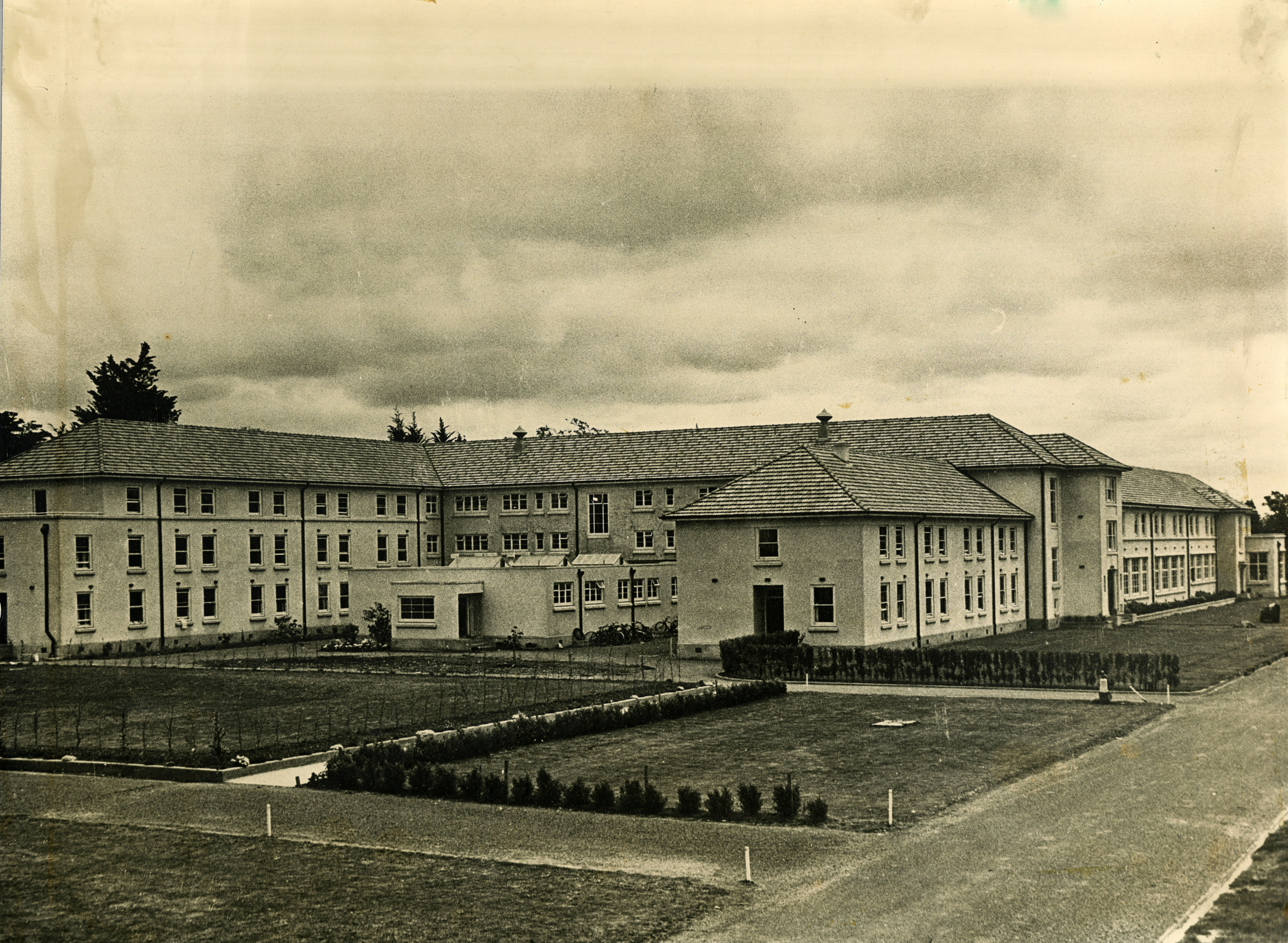
Hudson Hall in the 1950s, shortly after it was constructed

- The first major hall of residence on campus was Hudson Hall, named after College Principal Eric Hudson: its foundation stone was laid by Prime Minister Peter Fraser in July 1949, and it opened in 1953. Hudson Hall had bed and study accommodation for 184 students. It is now largely an administration building.
- Lincoln University has six halls of residence, of which Hudson Hall is the oldest. Colombo Hall, Lowrie Hall and Stevens Hall all opened in 1970, with Centennial Hall opening in 1978, Lincoln University's centenary year. The newest hall of residence is Southland Hall, built in 1993.
- The George Forbes Building, named after former Prime Minister George Forbes, began construction in 1957 and opened in 1960. This was the college's first purpose-built library, housing 10,000 books. Over the years the library expanded, and the present high-rise building was constructed in 1975. The library eventually outgrew the Forbes Building, and the George Forbes Memorial Library has been housed in Ivey Hall since 1989.
- Gillespie Hall, also known as the Student Union or Lincoln Union, consists of three buildings (Union, Annex, and Link) designed and built between 1962 and 1988. It was named after former Chairman William Gillespie, who had died in 1960. After the 2010 earthquake it was considered earthquake prone, and has been closed since 2010.

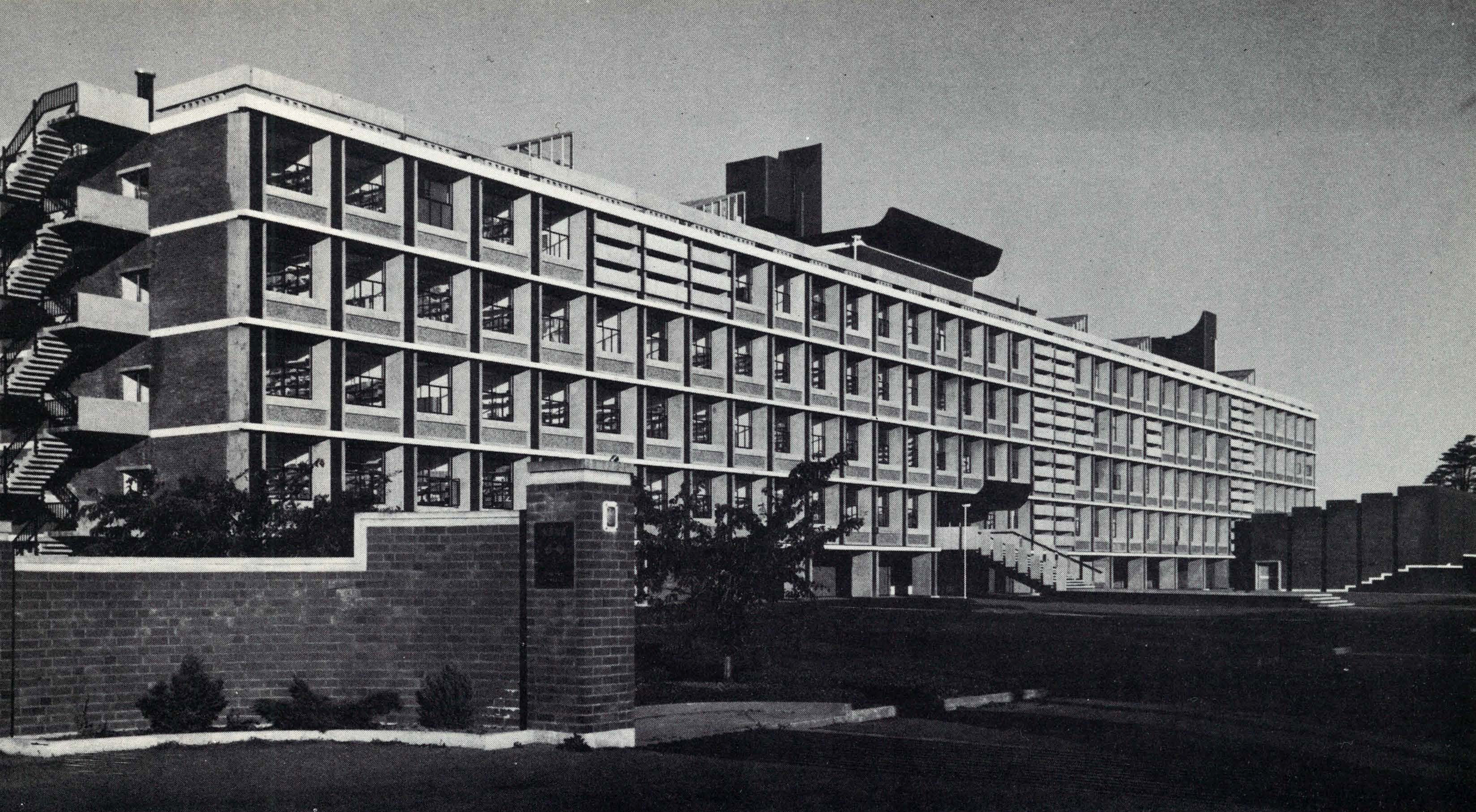
Hilgendorf Building, pictured in 1967 shortly before it was opened

- The Hilgendorf Building, constructed in 1968, was designed by Trengrove, Trengrove and Marshall Architects (now Totem Studio Architects) to cater to 550 full-time students. Named after early Lincoln lecturer Frederick William Hilgendorf, it was a concrete brutalist building, and was badly damaged in the 2010 earthquake and closed for repair. After engineering testing it was deemed unsalvageable and was demolished in 2015.
- The Hilgendorf's companion, the Burns Building, was constructed in a similar style, and the complex of two buildings with their lecture theatres and computer centre were often referred to as the Hilgendorf Wing and Burns Wing. Named after past Principal Malcolm Burns, Burns opened in 1976.
- The Stewart Building, which opened in 1990, is named after another past Principal, James D. Stewart. With two large lecture theatres each seating several hundred, its computerised teaching aids and audiovisual capacity were considered cutting-edge for New Zealand in 1990.
- Built in 1990 to provide lecture and seminar space for a rapidly-increasing intake of Commerce students, the Commerce Building sits on what was the Ivey Hall gardens.
- The cafe and dining hall Mrs O's was built in 2011 to incorporate the original dining hall building, then redesigned for earthquake safety and reopened in 2014. It is named after Mrs Joan O'Loughlin, one of Lincoln College's longest-serving staff (1966–1998), a cleaner and tea attendant much-loved by students.
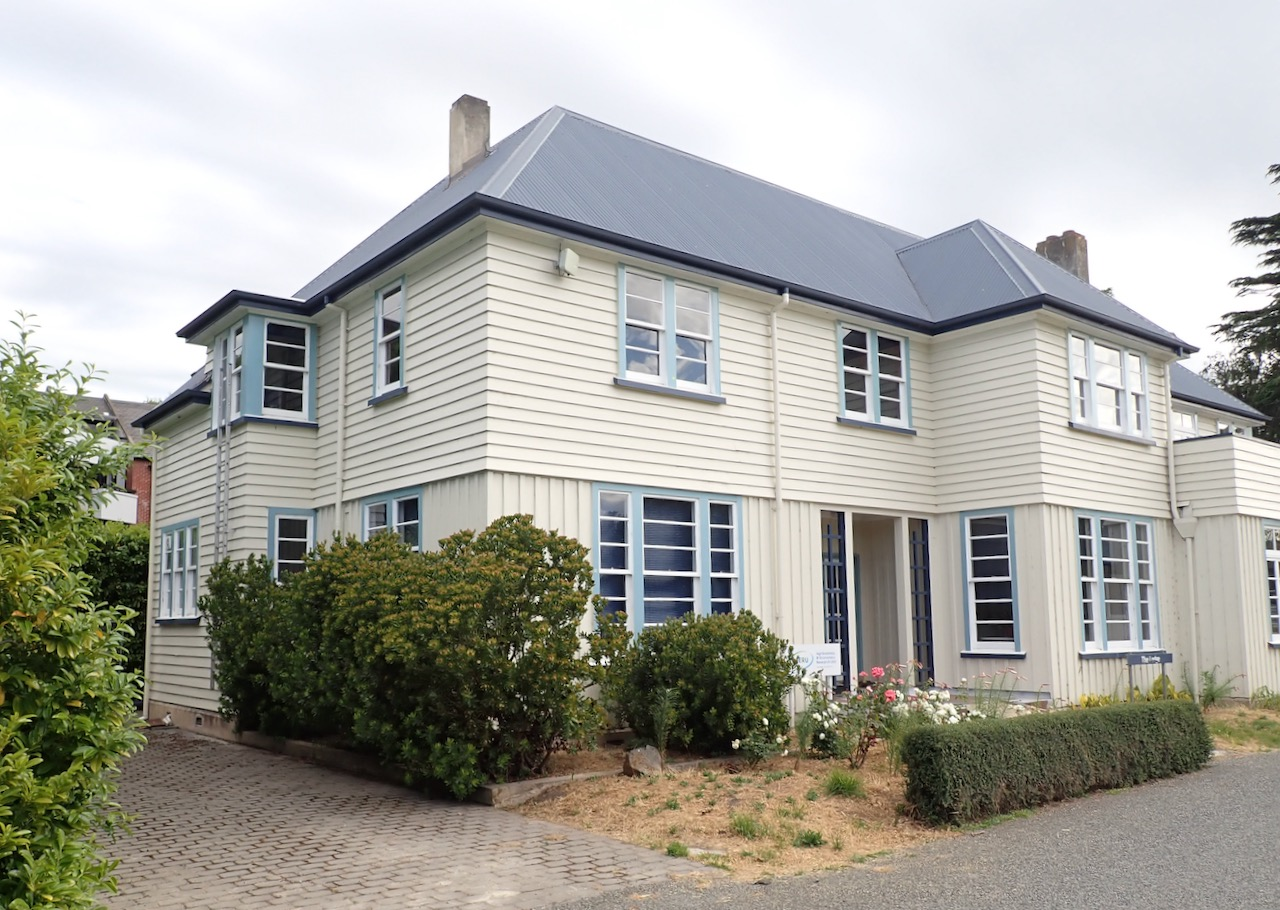
The Lodge

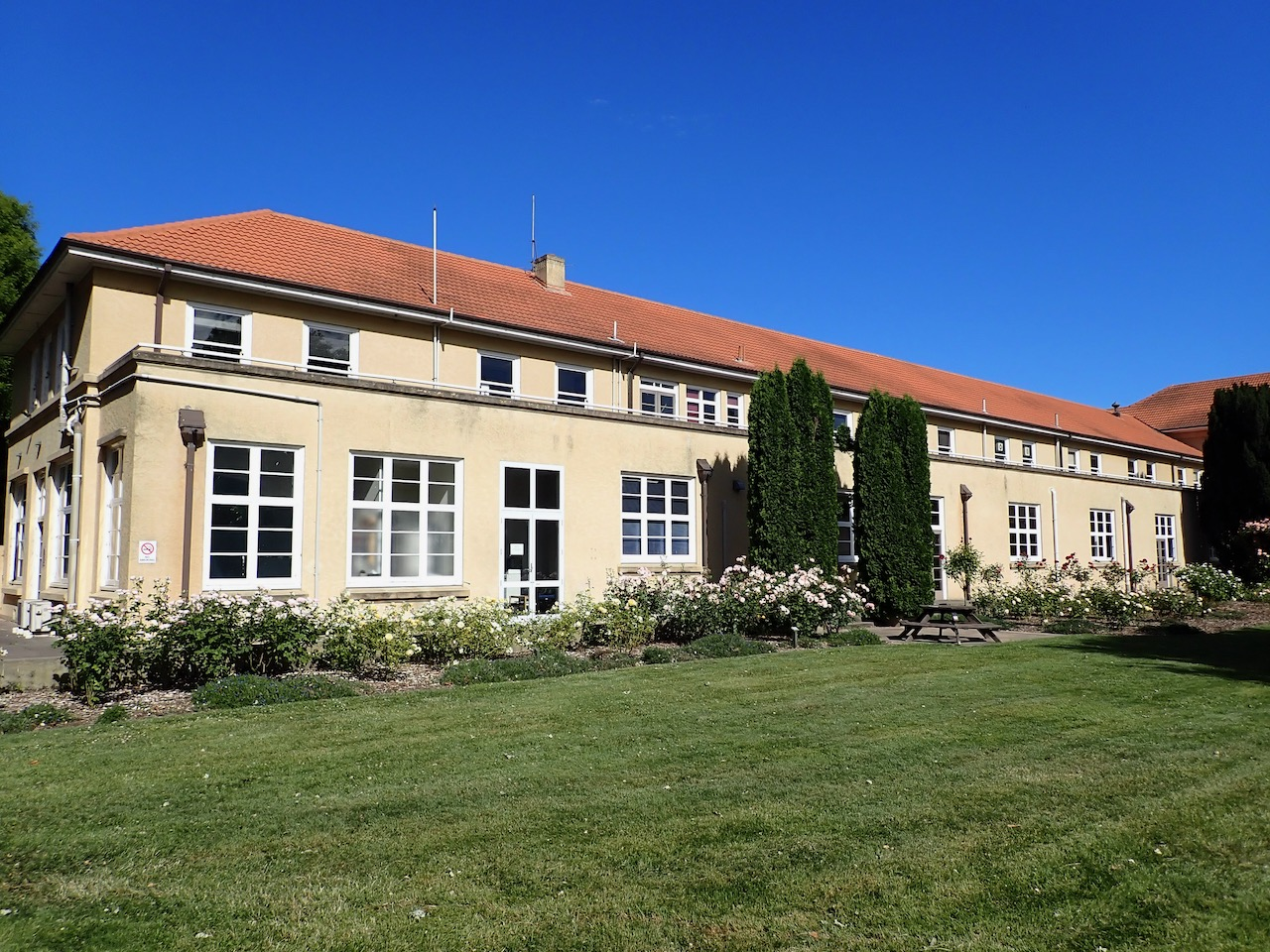
Hudson Hall

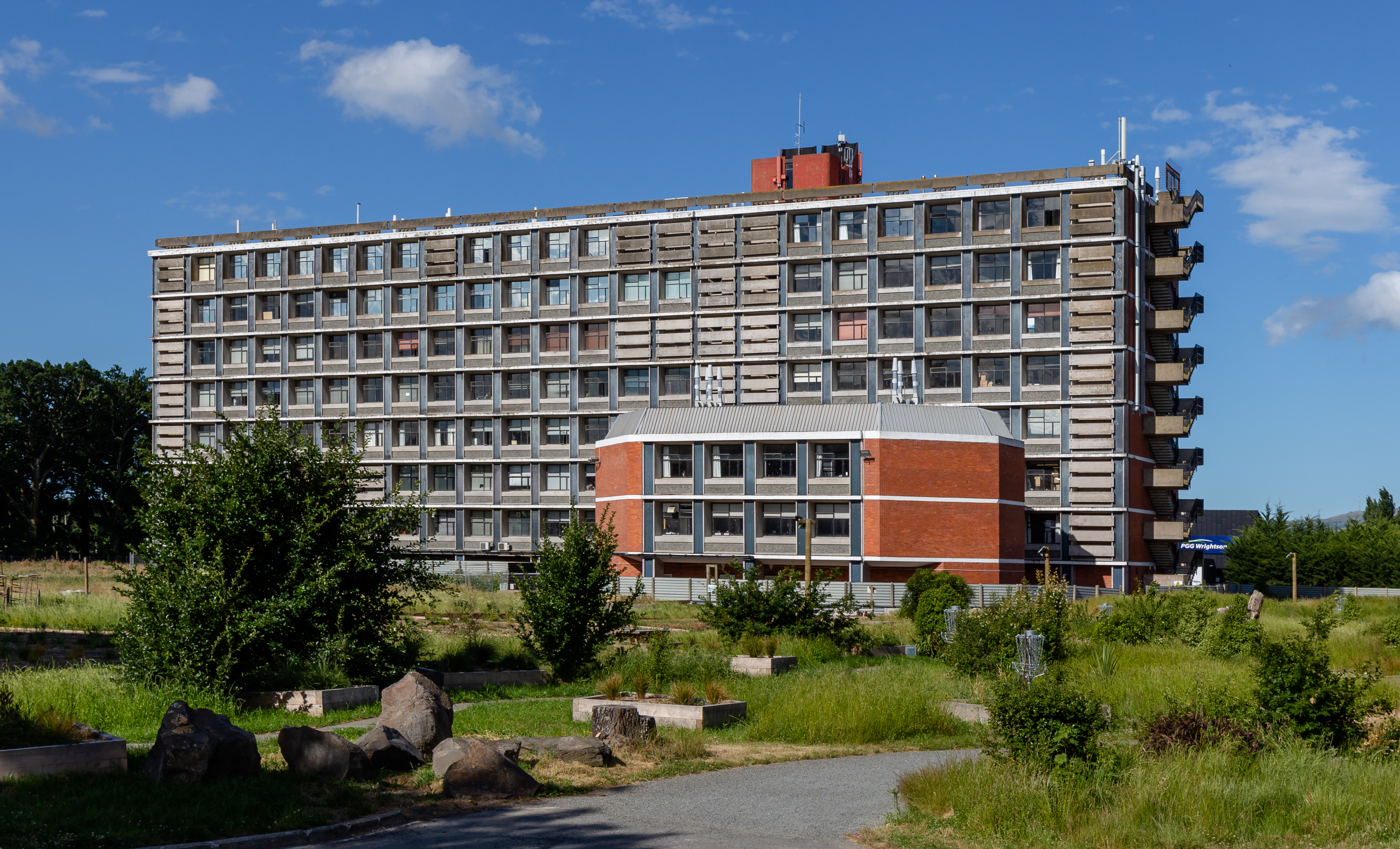
Burns Building

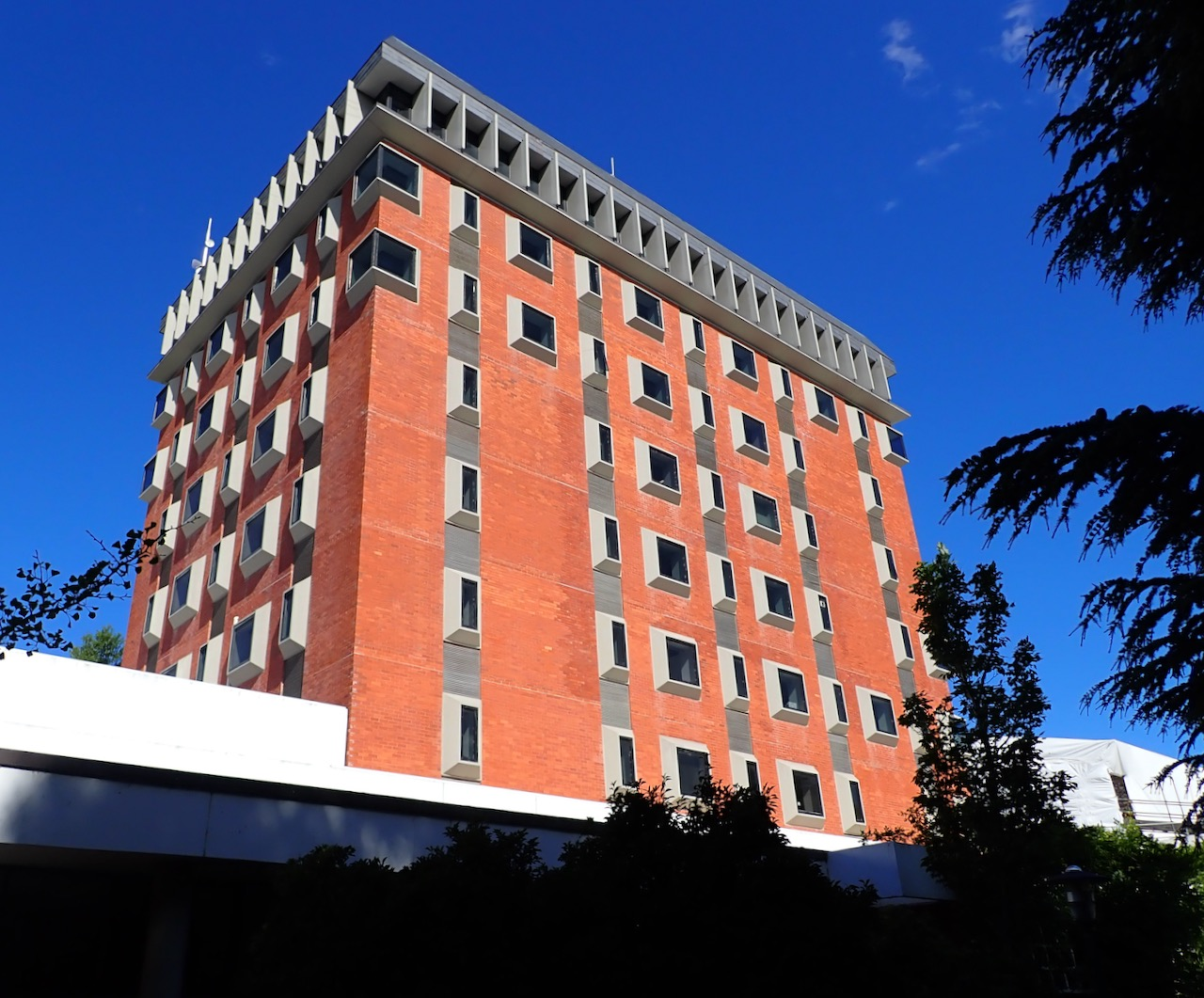
Forbes Building

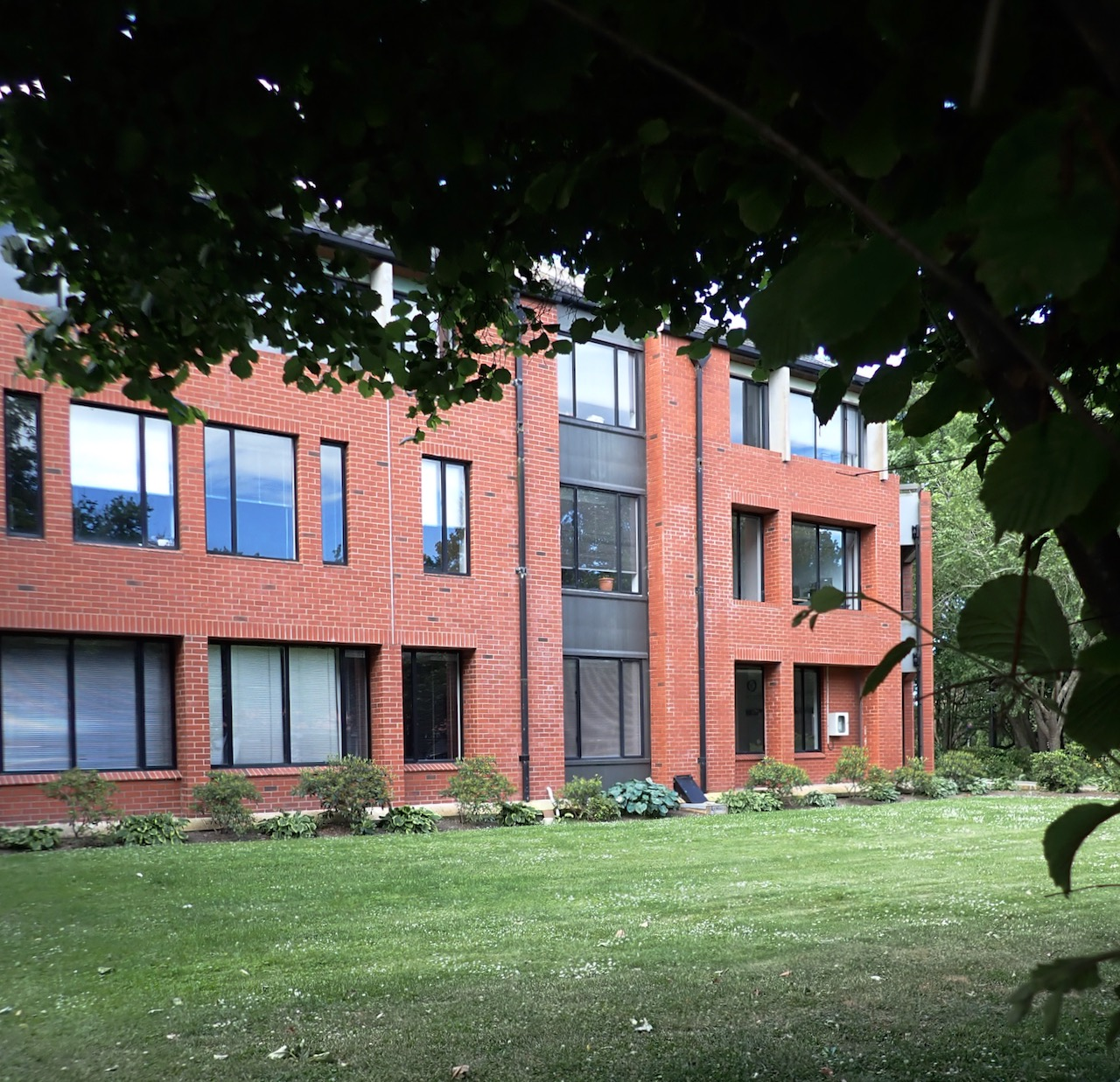
Commerce Building

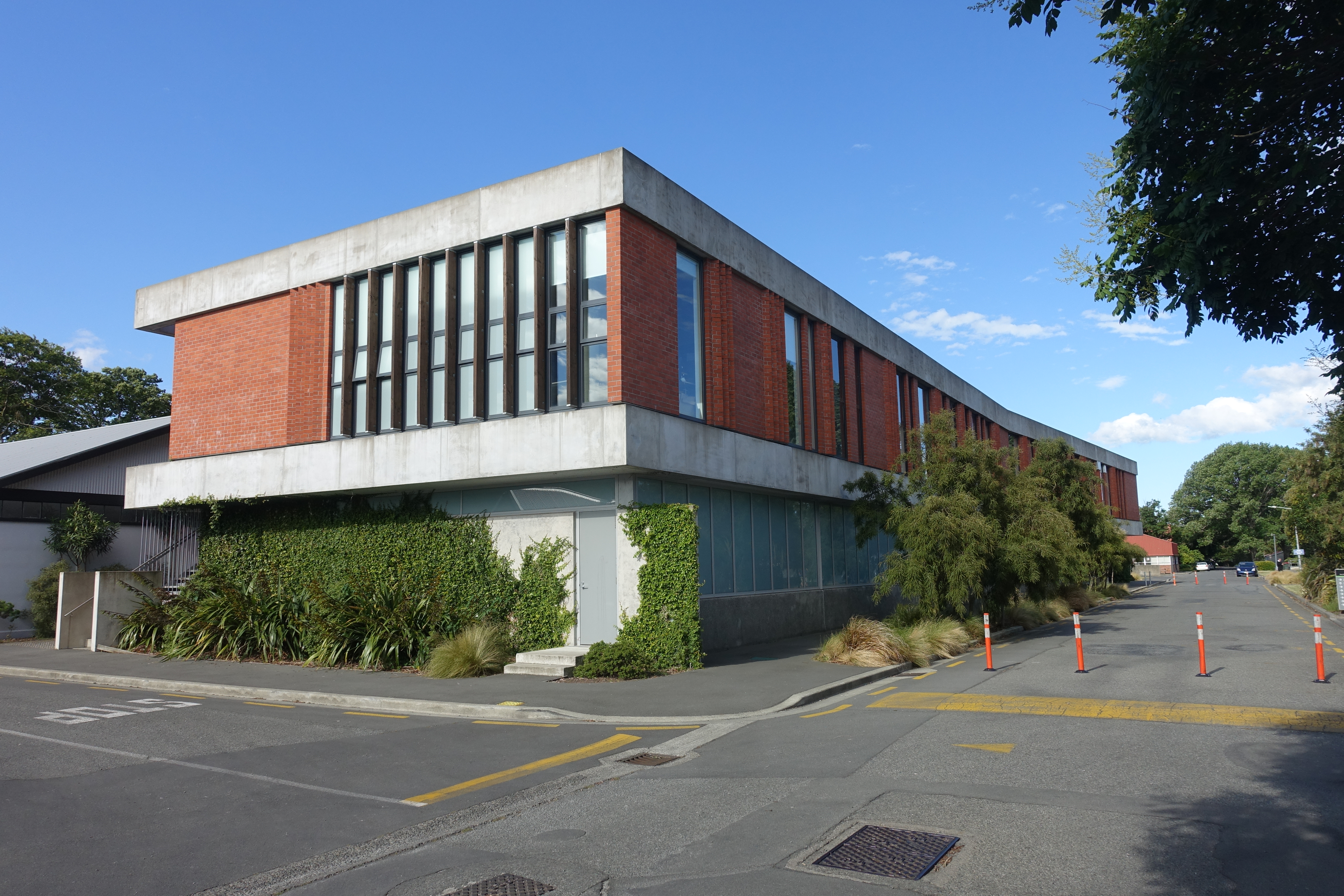
School of Landscape Architecture

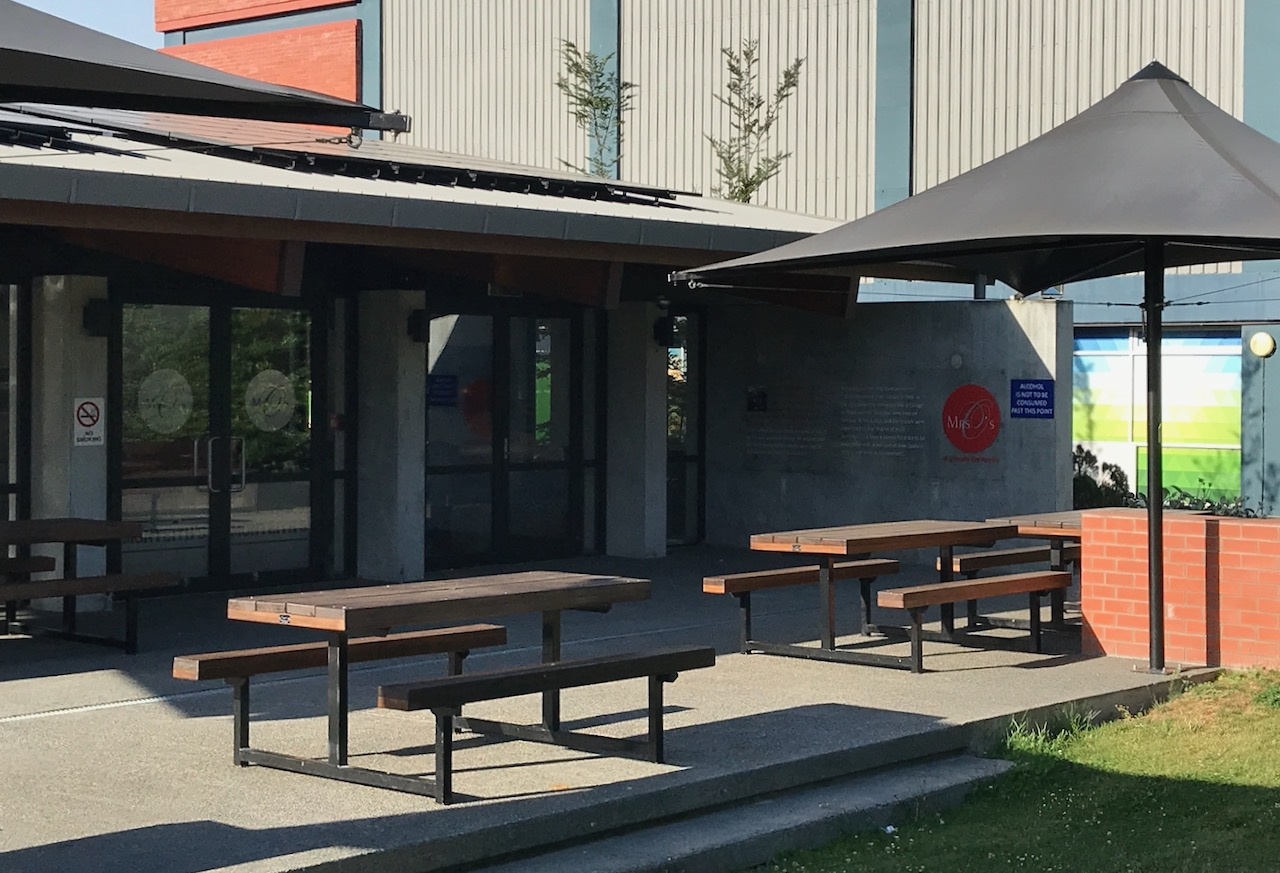
Mrs O's

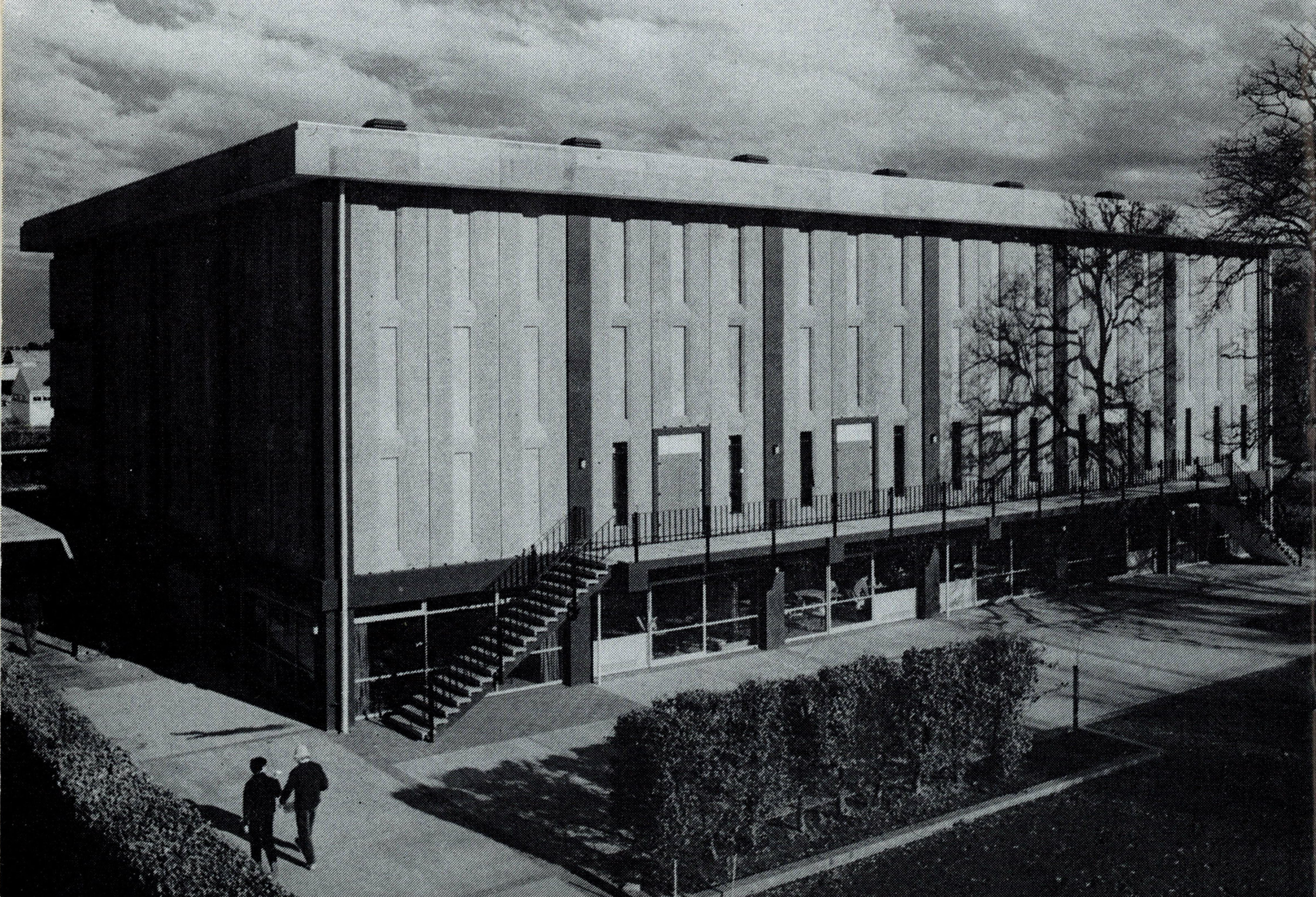
The Lincoln Union, incorporating Gillespie Hall, in the 1970s

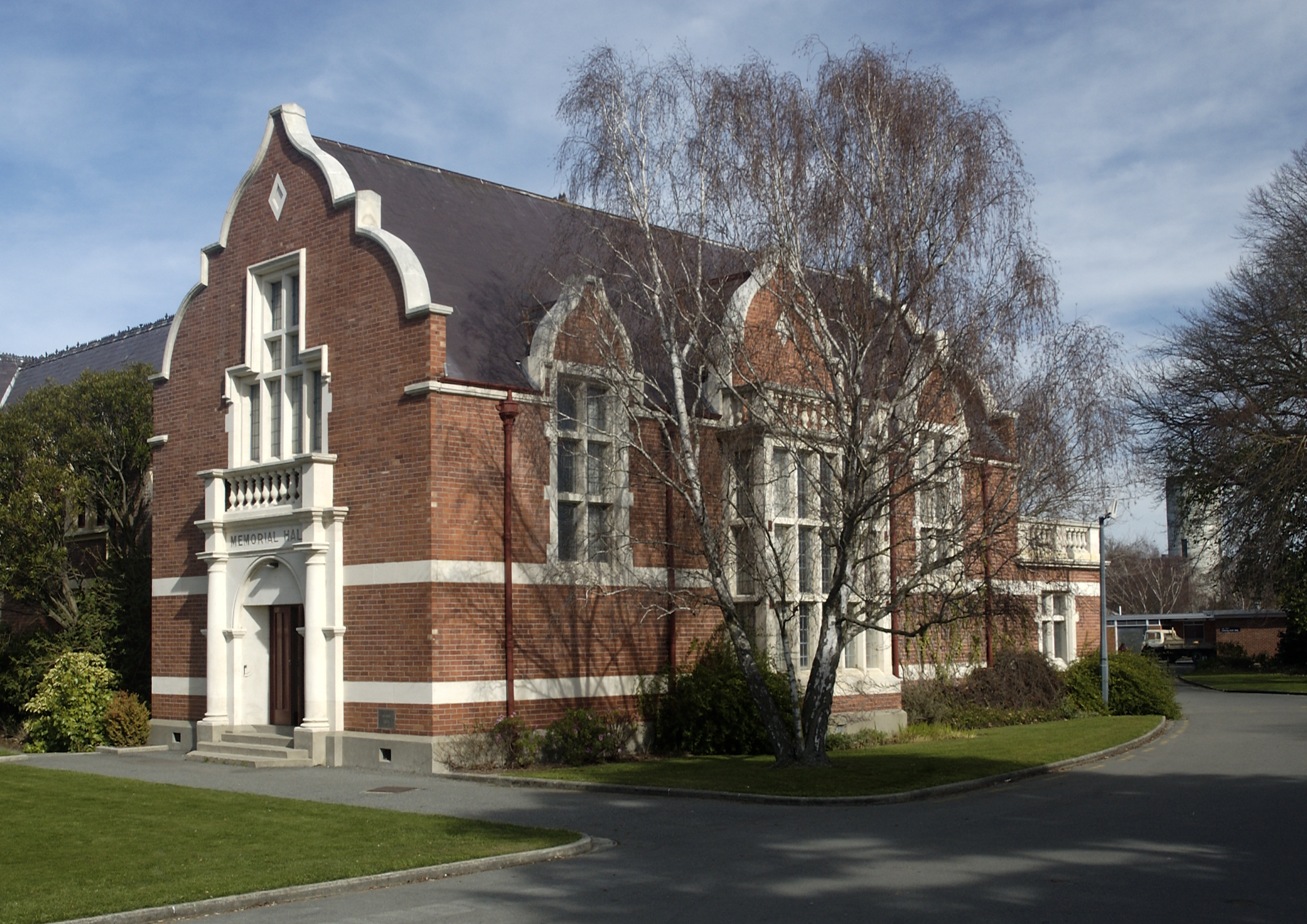
Memorial Hall in 2005

== Organisation and administration ==
=== Governance ===
==== List of directors, principals, and vice-chancellors ====
The School of Agriculture, followed by the Canterbury Agricultural College, was under the leadership of a director. From 1962, Lincoln College was headed by a principal, and after becoming Lincoln University in 1990, the role became that of vice-chancellor.

	Name	Portrait	Term
Director
1	William Ivey		1879–1892†
–	George Gray (acting)		1892–1893
2	John Bayne		1894–1901
–	George Gray (acting)		1901
3	William Lowrie		1901–1908
–	George Gray (acting)		1908
4	Robert Edward Alexander		1908–1935
–	Frederick Hilgendorf (acting)		1936
5	Eric Raymond Hudson		1936–1952
6	Malcolm Burns		1952–1961
Principal of Lincoln College
1	Malcolm Burns		1962–1974
2	James Stewart		1974–1984
3	Bruce Ross		1985–1989
Vice-chancellor of Lincoln University
1	Bruce Ross		1990–1996
2	Frank Wood		1997–2003
3	Roger Field		2004–2012
4	Andrew West		2012–2015
5	Robin Pollard		2016–2018
6	James McWha		2018
–	Bruce McKenzie (acting)		2019–2021
7	Grant Edwards		2022–present

==== List of chairs of the board of governors and college council, and chancellors ====
There was a board of governors from 1896 and a college council from 1962. Since full autonomy in 1990, the head of the university council has been the chancellor. The following chairmen and chancellors have served:

	Name	Portrait	Term
Chair of the Board of Governors
1	Henry Overton		1896–1899
2	Edward Stevens		1899–1915
3	Harry Knight		1915–1926
4	Charles Chilton		1927
5	John Deans		1928–1929
6	David Buddo		1930
7	Henry Denham		1931–1935
8	Charles Howard Hewlett		1936†
9	William Osborne Rennie		1936–1944
10	Bert Kyle		1945–1948
11	Christopher Thomas Aschman		1948–1950
12	William Gillespie		1951–1960
13	Jim Holderness		1961
Chair of the Lincoln College Council
1	Jim Holderness		1962–1967
2	John McAlpine		1968–1974
3	Donald Bain		1974–1979
4	Sid Hurst		1980–1985
5	Allan Wright		1986–1989
Chancellor of Lincoln University
1	Allan Wright		1990–1994
2	Malcolm Cameron		1995–1999
3	Margaret Austin		2000–2004
4	Tom Lambie		2005–2016
5	Tony Hall		2016–2017
6	Steve Smith		2017–2018
7	Bruce Gemmell		2019–present

† denotes that the person died in office

=== Faculties ===
- Faculty of Agribusiness and Commerce: accounting, business management, economics, farm management, finance, marketing and property studies.
- Faculty of Agriculture and Life Sciences: agronomy, plant science, crop physiology, pasture production, animal science, systems biology, computational modelling, food and wine science, entomology; plant pathology and crop protection; ecology, conservation and wildlife management; evolution, molecular genetics and biodiversity.
- Faculty of Environment, Society and Design: natural resources and complex systems engineering, environmental design, resource planning, transport studies, landscape architecture, Māori and indigenous planning and development, recreation management, social sciences, tourism, communication and exercise science.

== Student life ==
=== Students' association ===
Lincoln University Students' Association (LUSA) has been active on campus since 1919. LUSA acts as a representative for students on university policy, as well as providing advocacy services to students and running campus events such as the annual Garden Party and O-Week.

LUSA is central in organising, supporting and funding the clubs on campus. These clubs include but are not limited to; Lincoln Soils Society, Tramping and Climbing Club, Wine Appreciation Club, LSD (Lincoln Snowboarding Department), Alpine Club, LEO (Lincoln Environmental Organisation), Food Appreciation Club, The Lincoln University Campus Choir, Bunch Rides (cycling), Lincoln University Rugby Club, Lincoln Malaysian Students Society (LMSS), International Rugby Club, SPACE (lesbian, gay, bisexual and transgender students on campus), Boxing Club, Young Farmers Club, and Lincoln Christian Fellowship.

=== International students ===
In 2018 Lincoln University has 1369 international students (up 10% from the previous year) from 75 countries.

== Academic profile ==
University rankings

Global – Overall
- QS World: 407 (2026)
- THE World: 501–600 (2026)
- USNWR Global: =1178 (25/26)

National – Overall
- QS National: 7 (2026)
- THE National: 5-7 (2026)
- USNWR National: 8 (25/26)

=== Academic reputation ===
In the 2026 Quacquarelli Symonds World University Rankings (published 2025), the university attained a position of #407 (7th nationally).

In the Times Higher Education World University Rankings 2026 (published 2025), the university attained a position of #501–600 (5-7th nationally).

In the 2025–2026 U.S. News & World Report Best Global Universities, the university attained a tied position of #1178 (8th nationally).

=== Research ===
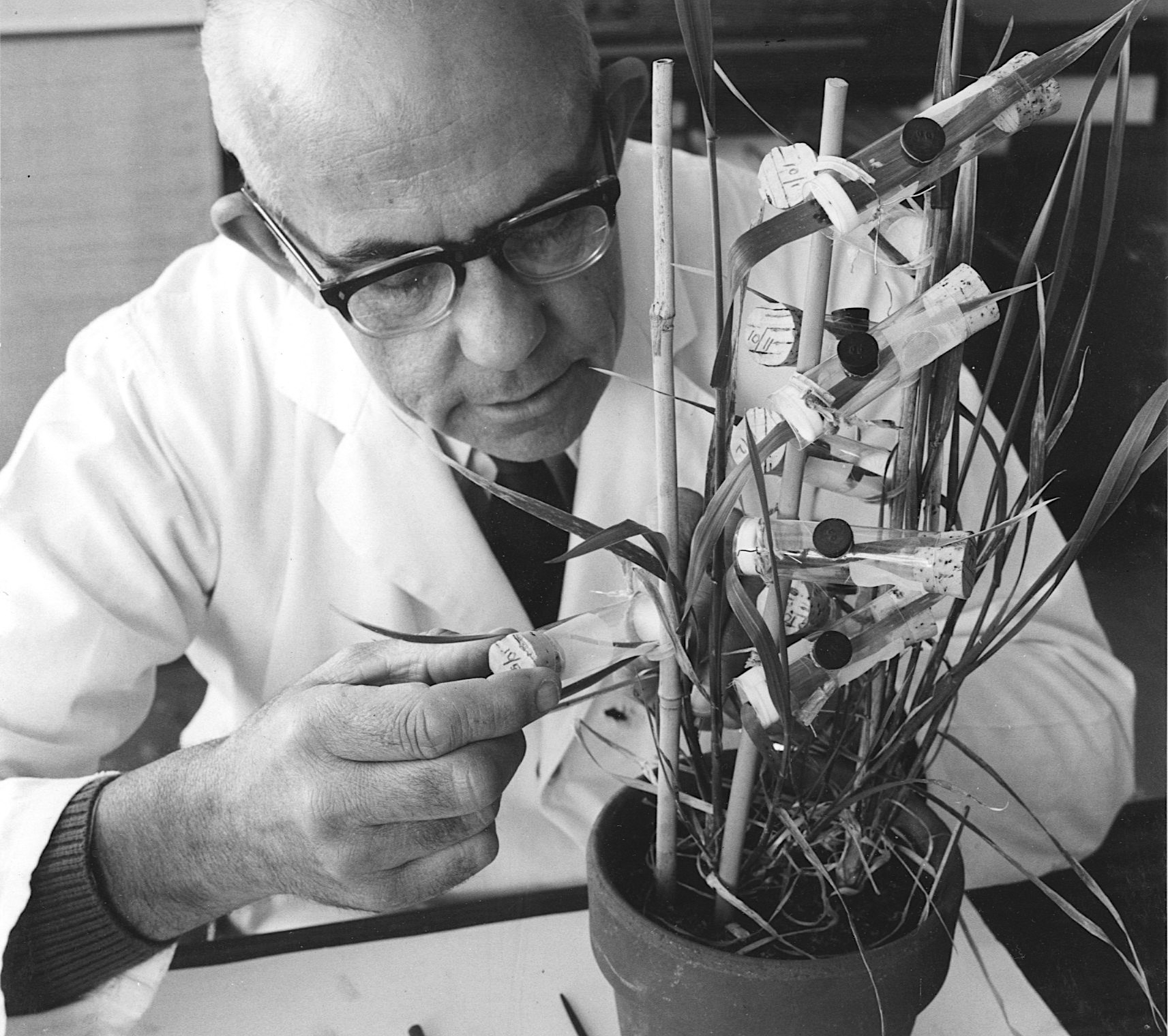
Studying wheat aphids in the early 1970s

Lincoln University has had an Entomology Research Collection since the late 1960s, which is now the third-largest entomology collection in New Zealand, containing approximately 500,000 specimens and about 60 types.

== Notable people ==
=== Alumni ===
- Richie McCaw – former All Blacks Captain
- Sam Whitelock – All Black
- Andy Ellis – former All Black
- Maggie Barry – National MP
- Col Campbell (1933–2012) – TV/radio presenter
- Turi Carroll – President of the New Zealand Māori Council
- David Carter (born 1952) – National MP and former Speaker of the House of Parliament
- Andy Dalton – former All Black captain
- Robbie Deans – former All Black and former Wallabies coach
- Jonathan Elworthy (1936–2005) – former National MP
- John Hayes (born 1948) – former diplomat and current National MP
- Rodney Hide (born 1956) – former ACT MP
- Mark Inglis – mountaineer
- Annabel Langbein – cook and author
- Don McKinnon (born 1939), former National MP
- Jeremy Rockliff – Premier of Tasmania
- Toni Street – television host
- Reuben Thorne – former All Blacks Captain
- Charles Upham VC & Bar – most highly decorated Commonwealth soldier of WWII
- Wilson Whineray – former All Blacks Captain

=== Honorary degrees ===
Lincoln University has since 1993 been conferring honorary doctorates.

=== Faculty ===
- Margaret Austin
- Roger Field
- Thomas Kirk
- Bianca van Rangelrooy
- Peter Skelton – environmental law
- Kerry-Jayne Wilson
- Roslyn Kerr – sports sociologist

=== Rhodes Scholars from Lincoln ===
- 1940 Henry Garrett
- 1951 Lloyd Evans
- 1986 Forbes Elworthy
- 1991 Grant Edwards
- 2019 James Ranstead

== See also ==
- Lincoln University Art Collection

== Works cited ==
- Blair, Ian Douglas (1978). The Seed They Sowed: Centennial Story of Lincoln College (PDF). Lincoln, New Zealand: Lincoln College.
- Gustafson, Barry (1986). The First 50 Years : A History of the New Zealand National Party. Auckland: Reed Methuen. ISBN 0-474-00177-6.
