= Bund family of Wick Episcopi =

The Bund (later Willis-Bund, later MacCarthy-Willis-Bund) family of Wick Episcopi owned estates in Worcestershire since the fifteenth century; from this armigerous landed gentry family came (and allied to which through marriage were) several individuals of note in the fields of law, local government and literature.

== History ==
According to the 1925 edition of Burke's Landed Gentry, the earliest mention of the family in current registries is dated 18 January 1559, this being the marriage of Edward Frenche and Jane Bund. At that time the family held the property at Wick that they were still recorded as holding in the twentieth century. The Bund family were however known to have been landowners in the area since at least 1457.

Alongside their property at Wick Episcopi, the Bund family held land at Upper Wick, Laughern Grove (later 'Bunde Grove'; previously part of the manor of Laughern Dabitot, so named for its possession by Sheriff of Worcestershire Urse d'Abetot and his brother Robert Despenser [fl. 1086], Norman allies of William the Conqueror who came from a family resident at St Jean d'Abbetot, Normandy, they having claimed the property of Cyneweard of Laughern, the former Sheriff of Worcester), Boughton (also 'Boulton'; originally part of Wick Episcopi, but only acquired by the Bund family in 1778), White Ladies Aston, south-east of Worcester, and at Fladbury (including a manor house at which the regicide Oliver Cromwell stayed in 1651, on his way to the Battle of Worcester, the final battle of the English Civil War). They also owned farms at Offenham and Sedgeberrow. The Bund family is mainly memorialised at the church of St John Baptist in Bedwardine.

The eighth head of the family was Colonel Thomas Henry Bund (1774-1852), of the Worcester Militia and formerly the 13th Light Dragoons, son of Thomas Bund, High Sheriff of Worcestershire in 1784, by his wife Susanna, daughter of Benjamin Johnson, mayor of Worcester and High Sheriff of Worcestershire in 1763; his issue (by his wife Ann, daughter of Rev. Pynson Wilmot, vicar of Halesowen, which family were co-heirs to the Barony of Dudley, and from which the Barons Wilmot, later created Earls of Rochester, also descended) failed in the male line on the death of Rev. Thomas Henry Benjamin Bund (1812-1846), M.A., formerly of the Inner Temple and the Oxford Circuit. The heir became Rev. Thomas H. B. Bund's sister Ann Susanna Kent Bund, second wife of the colonial judge John Walpole Willis, he becoming head of the family in jure uxoris. Their son, John, a lawyer and historian, adopted the additional name of Bund in 1864 by Royal Licence; when his male issue died without having children of their own, the position of head of the family fell to his daughter Margaret's son (by her husband John Henry Milward, of the Redditch needle-manufacturing family) Rev. Henry Harding Milward (1896-1950), of Brook Park, Saltash, Cornwall, perpetual curate of Tideford, Cornwall, who adopted the names of Willis-Bund in 1930; on his death without issue, his first cousin (son of his mother's younger sister, Mary, by her husband John Leader MacCarthy, of Goldington, Bedford, civil engineer) Francis Leader MacCarthy (later Chaplain, Dean and Fellow of Balliol College, Oxford) succeeded him, taking the additional names of Willis-Bund the same year.

A descent from Henry III (and, thus, from William the Conqueror) by his wife Eleanor of Provence- via Thomas de Mowbray, 1st Duke of Norfolk, the Berkeley family, and the Wylde family- stemming from the 1695 marriage of Thomas Bund (the fifth head of the family) and Susannah, daughter of Rev. John Vernon, rector of Martley, Worcestershire was presented in The Genealogical Magazine (vol. 2, 1899, p. 257).

Wick Episcopi was subsequently owned by the historian and peace campaigner E. P. Thompson, until his death in 1993; the house "was routinely alive with long- and short-term guests; it was a place for tutorials and seminars, and meetings of all sorts".

== Related people ==
=== Willis ===
Members of the Willis family that married into the Bund family in 1836 include: Frederick Smythe Willis, mayor of Willoughby, New South Wales, and a founder member of the Corporation of Accountants of Australia; the clergyman and author William Downes Willis; and the engineer and archaeologist Leslie R. H. Willis. The Willises were merchants, landowners, and local government officers who married into minor gentry families at Wakefield, Yorkshire since the seventeenth century, and were descendants of the same Cambridgeshire family as the Willys baronets of Fen Ditton.

=== Other families ===
John William Willis-Bund married first, in 1872, Harriette Penelope (1846-1895), daughter of Richard Temple, of The Nash, Worcester, and sister to Sir Richard Temple, 1st Baronet. His second wife, whom he married in 1896 as a widower, was Mary Elizabeth, daughter of General Frederick Rennell Thackeray and Lady Elizabeth Margaret Carnegie (daughter of William Carnegie, 7th Earl of Northesk); her second cousin was the writer William Makepeace Thackeray.

Arthur Clutton-Brock, the essayist, critic and journalist, was son of John William Willis-Bund's first cousin, Mary Alice (daughter of Rev. Henry Thomas Hill, rector of Felton, Herefordshire, by his wife Ursula, daughter of Col Thomas Henry Bund).

The travel writer, novelist and journalist Bruce Chatwin was the great-nephew of Margaret Milward (née Willis-Bund), being grandson of her husband's sister Isabel (1872-1952) and her husband Leslie Boughton Chatwin, of Birmingham, solicitor.

Catherine, daughter of Rev. William Probyn, vicar of Pershore by his wife Mary, granddaughter of William Bund, sixth head of the family, married Rev. John Hurst, rector of Thakeham, Sussex, brother to Robert Henry Hurst (1788-1857), M.P. for Horsham from 1832 to 1841 and from 1844 to 1847. Their granddaughter, Mary Eliza Maud Boissier (daughter of Maj. John William Boissier, of the 10th Cotswold Rifles [great-uncle of Harrow headmaster and cricketer Paul Boissier, whose daughter, musician and patron Beatrice Mary June, married David Gordon, 4th Marquess of Aberdeen and Temair] by their daughter Catherine Mary) married in 1888 Rivett Francis Guise (1853-1908), of the Bengal Police, paternal grandson of General Sir John Wright Guise, 3rd Baronet, at the time of his death senior general in the Army List, and maternal grandson of Sir James Rivett-Carnac, 1st Baronet, Governor of the Bombay Presidency from 1838 to 1841. Sir James Rivett-Carnac's daughter Louisa Anne was the wife of Richard Temple, of The Nash, Worcester (father-in-law to John William Willis-Bund), father of Sir Richard Temple, 1st Baronet, and grandfather of the anthropologist Sir Richard Carnac Temple, 2nd Baronet, British Chief Commissioner of the Andaman and Nicobar Islands from 1894 to 1904.

== Coat of arms ==
The coat of arms of the head of the Bund family was blazoned "Gules, three eagle's legs erased à la cuisse, two and one, or".
