= Leslie R. H. Willis =

English engineer and archaeologist

Leslie R. H. Willis (13 July 1908 – 12 March 1984) was an English mechanical and electrical engineer and archaeologist, who excavated the Iron Age settlement at the hamlet of Dainton, at Ipplepen, Teignbridge, Devon in the late 1940s.

== Early life and education ==
The son of William Willis, J.P., a timber merchant and farmer, formerly a mounted police officer and inspector for the Fisheries Commission, Willis was brought up at St John's Wood, Marylebone, and at Islington. His mother was a first cousin of General Frederick Charles Maisey, who excavated the Buddhist complex of Sanchi in 1851, and was aunt of T. M. Wilkes, head of New Zealand's civil aviation in the 1930s and 1940s. His uncle, Frederick Smythe Willis, was an accountant (a founder member and first hon. treasurer of the Corporation of Accountants of Australia) and Mayor of Willoughby, New South Wales, the Willises- a wealthy farming family from the minor gentry- having settled in New Zealand in the late 1800s; he was a descendant of the colonial judge John Walpole Willis (and so a relative of his elder brother, William Downes Willis, a clergyman and theologian). He was educated at the Mercers' School, then the University of London and Faraday House Electrical Engineering College (at which he would later lecture). He served in the Royal Artillery and, during the Second World War, with the R.A.F. in India. After the war, he was awarded a Postgraduate Diploma of Prehistoric Archaeology from the Institute of Archaeology (now part of UCL) at the University of London, where he was in the same cohort as Sinclair Hood and Leslie Grinsell; senior by a year were Nancy Sandars, Grace Simpson, and Edward Pyddoke.

== Career ==
Willis was an engineer (being a Member of the Institute of Mechanical Engineers and of the Institute of Electrical Engineers, and an associate member of the North East Coast Institution of Engineers and Shipbuilders) working particularly in the field of tribology (sometimes under the discipline's founder, Peter Jost), including at a laboratory in North London until his retirement, where he worked on applications of molybdenum disulphide and polybutylcuprysil, including production of oil-soluble organometallics for reduction of friction in mechanisms. The company was given a Queen's Award for its development of polybutylcuprysil products.

In the late 1940s, he had participated in the archaeological dig at Dainton, Devon, where E. H. Rogers (who excavated the pre-Bronze Age Yelland Stone Rows near the village of Yelland in Devon in the 1930s) had discovered what proved to be an Early Iron Age farming settlement. Willis was in charge of the excavation on behalf of the Devon Archaeological Exploration Society; the initial phase took three weeks in August 1949, centred on Dainton Common. The site comprised two enclosures, outside which were situated several mounds. Rogers and Willis subsequently produced reports on the layout of the buildings discovered, and the items found there (including, for example, the presence of haematite ware amongst the pottery, and that ceremonial metalworking debris was found). The materials were placed in museums at Exeter and Torquay.

Willis was a member of the Museums Association from 1946, and of the Prehistoric Society from 1947. He was amongst those invited to attend the 19th International Geological Congress at Algiers in 1952, and the 20th Congress, in Mexico. In 1981, he became a member of the Hendon and District Archaeological Society.

== Personal life ==
Willis married the youngest daughter of a London building contractor, a relative by marriage of Sir Edward Lugard, Permanent Under-Secretary of State for War from 1861 to 1871; they had two sons. They lived in North London, including at Fox Hall, and White Lodge, Enfield, and North Dene, Winchmore Hill. He died in 1984 of complications from pneumonia, survived by his sons, grandsons, and his elder brother Sidney Willis, MVO, of The Old Rectory, Havering, a civil servant. Another brother, who predeceased him, was married to the sister of journalist and author Aileen Pippett.
