= R v Bonjon =

- Court: Supreme Court of New South Wales for the District of Port Phillip
- Full case name: R v Bonjon
- Decided: 16 September 1841
- Citation: [1841] NSWSupC 92
- Transcript: Port Phillip Patriot, 20 September 1841.

Court membership
- Judge sitting: Willis J

Case opinions
- the acquisition of British sovereignty over Australia was by settlement, not by conquest or cession; the Aboriginal people are not British subjects, but are "distinct, though dependent tribes governed among themselves by their own rude laws and customs"; the jurisdiction of the court over crimes committed by Aboriginal people inter se is strongly doubted; final decisions on these matters are reserved

R v Bonjon was a criminal court case, decided in the Supreme Court of New South Wales for the District of Port Phillip on 16 September 1841, in which Bonjon, an Aboriginal man, had been charged with murder for killing Yammowing, another Aboriginal man. The main issue in the case was whether the colonial courts had jurisdiction over offences committed by Aboriginal people inter se, that is, by one Aboriginal person against another.

Judge Willis extensively considered the legal situation as to the British acquisition of sovereignty over Australia, and its consequences for the Aboriginal people. Though not finally deciding the question, he indicated that he strongly doubted that he had jurisdiction. The trial of Bonjon was allowed to proceed without prejudice as to the question of jurisdiction, but the prosecution ultimately abandoned the case and Bonjon was eventually discharged.

The case, long forgotten after it was decided, has more recently been recognised for the significance of its reasoning; several commentators have compared it to the famous 1992 Mabo case, though "reached 150 years earlier by an irascible judge in the bush town of Melbourne."

== Background to the case ==
The defendant Bonjon (or, alternately, "Bon Jon") was an Aboriginal man of the Wathaurong people. (Note: Reports of the case give the name of Bonjon's people as "Wadora", an alternative spelling of an alternate name for the Wathaurong. See "Detailed record of the Wathaurung". Australian Aboriginal tribal database. AusAnthrop.) According to the Wesleyan missionary Francis Tuckfield, one of the witnesses in the case, Bonjon had been in contact with Europeans more than any other member of the Wathaurong, having even been a volunteer member of the Native Police for some time. According to police magistrate Foster Fyans, Bonjon was with the Native Police for seven months, tracking runaway horses and generally assisting the other members.

The victim Yammowing was of the Gulidjan people, whose territory bordered that of the Wathaurong. (Note: Reports of the case give the name of Yammowing's people as "Colijon", an alternative name for the Gulidjan.) Tuckfield knew Yammowing well, as he had lived among the Gulidjan from time to time while working at the Buntingdale mission station near Birregurra.

The prosecution alleged that on or about 14 July 1841, Bonjon shot Yammowing in the head with a carbine at Geelong, killing him. At the time, the area was part of the Port Phillip District within the colony of New South Wales, and so the case fell within the jurisdiction of the Supreme Court of New South Wales for the District of Port Phillip. The case was heard before Judge Willis, the Resident Judge, in Melbourne on 16 September 1841.

== Arguments ==
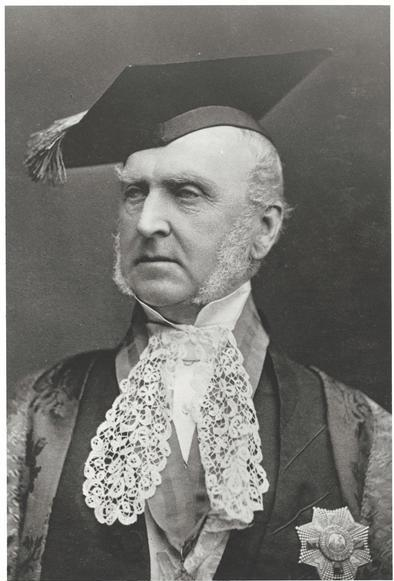
Bonjon was represented by Redmond Barry, pictured.

Bonjon was represented by Redmond Barry, and the Crown Prosecutor James Croke appeared for the prosecution.

=== Capacity of Bonjon ===
There were two issues as to the capacity of Bonjon for the jury to consider: firstly, whether Bonjon had the capacity to enter a plea to the jurisdiction; and secondly, whether Bonjon had the capacity to enter a plea to the general issue, that is, a plea of guilty or not guilty.

A number of witnesses were called as to the question of capacity. Barry initially called George Augustus Robinson, then the Chief Protector of Aborigines in the Port Phillip District, who testified that he was "acquainted with the customs of the natives", but had no "intimate knowledge" of Bonjon personally; he informed the court that Francis Tuckfield had been responsible for Bonjon's people.

Tuckfield was the next witness called, and he testified that Bonjon "entertains some ideas of a Supreme Being", but that his ideas were "very imperfect and indistinct notions, not sufficient for him to understand the nature and obligations of an oath." Justice Willis explained to Tuckfield the nature of a plea to the jurisdiction, after which Tuckfield added that he did not think Bonjon could enter such a plea, although he was satisfied Bonjon could plead guilty or not guilty. On cross-examination by Croke, Tuckfield testified that "[m]urder is considered a crime amongst the Aboriginals, but under all circumstances I do not think they would consider it as such, there are some exceptions."

The final witness was Fyans, who outlined Bonjon's service with the Native Police, and added that he considered Bonjon "particularly sharp and intelligent in his own way", though he could not speak English very well.

After this, Judge Willis put the question to the jury, who unanimously decided that Bonjon did not have the capacity to enter a plea to the jurisdiction. At Judge Willis' suggestion, and with the agreement of the parties, the question as to the general plea was put to the jury without recalling the witnesses: the jury decided that Bonjon had capacity to know whether he did or did not kill Yammowing, but not to plead guilty or not guilty, "as murder is not always considered a crime with the Aborigines".

Judge Willis however considered that Bonjon "is not so totally wanting intellect as not to say guilty or not guilty", and thus decided that the case could proceed to the question of jurisdiction.

=== Plea to the jurisdiction ===
The main arguments in the case were as to whether the court had jurisdiction over Bonjon.

==== Defence ====
Barry opened his argument by acknowledging the significance and novelty of the case, adding that he was "also impressed with the assurance of its being highly interesting as well to those resident in this district as to the inhabitants of the neighbouring colonies." Barry also referred to a report recently made by George Grey, the recently appointed Governor of South Australia, to the Colonial Secretary concerning his views on the Aboriginal people of South Australia, in which Grey advocated that "the aboriginal natives should be tried by British law as now dispensed with respect to the European subjects of Her Majesty resident in the colony, and visited with punishment for offences committed by the natives amongst themselves". Barry used this, along with the Colonial Secretary's reply (although he was unable to obtain a copy of for the court), to introduce his proposition that the ability under the current law to try Aboriginal persons for crimes committed against other Aboriginal persons either "[did] not exist, or... is so debatable a matter, so much of a 'vexata questio,' as to call for some declaratory expression on the part of Her Majesty's government."

Barry refined the proposition in this way: "That there is nothing in the establishment of British sovereignty in this country which authorizes our submitting the aboriginal natives to punishment for acts of aggression committed 'inter se.'"

Much of Barry's argument related to concepts at international law on the acquisition of sovereignty. Barry referred to the methods of acquisition recognised under English law, as laid out in Blackstone's Commentaries on the Laws of England, where Blackstone describes the doctrine of reception:

"Plantations or colonies, in distant countries, are either such where the lands are claimed by right of occupancy only, by finding them desert and uncultivated, and peopling them from the mother-country; or where, when already cultivated, they have been either gained by conquest, or ceded to us by treaties."

Barry also noted the 1774 case of Campbell v Hall, in which one issue was the British acquisition of sovereignty over Grenada, where those same principles had been explored by Lord Mansfield. Grenada had been ceded to the English by the French under the 1763 Treaty of Paris, and so Lord Mansfield's principles dealt with conquest and cession; Barry however argued that the asserted basis for British sovereignty in Australia was not either of these methods, but rather "occupancy alone".

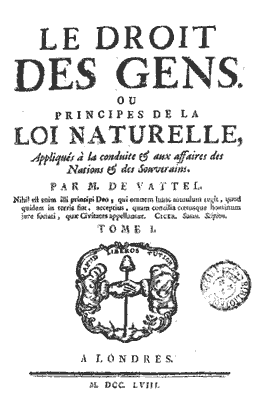
The cover page of Vattel's The Law of Nations.

In order to explain the position in international law relating to acquisition by settlement, Barry turned to Vattel's The Law of Nations, quoting two long passages, in which Vattel posited that:

"Families wandering in a country, as the nations of shepherds who pass over it accordingly as their wants require, possess it in common; it belongs to them exclusively of all other nations, and we cannot without injustice deprive them of the countries that are appropriated to their use... [but] provided that people are not reduced to want land, others might, without injustice, settle in some parts of a region which they were not in a condition to inhabit naturally."

Barry, though not challenging this principle, said that nothing in it meant that the laws and customs of the indigenous peoples of any territory so settled were necessarily negated. Indeed, Barry argued that the "mere act of occupancy that gives to the crown a right to the soil, can confer no authority whatsoever over the aboriginal inhabitants as subjects, unless there be some treaty or compact, or public demonstration of some kind on the part of the natives, by which they testify their desire to come beneath the yoke of the law"; he argued that the Aboriginal peoples of Australia had made no such treaty, nor any such demonstration.

Barry acknowledged the introduction of the Native Police, and the institution of the Port Phillip Protectorate, but said that in reality those measures were intended more for the protection of white settlers than for the Aboriginal people. Barry also raised the example of laws which prohibited the sale or supply of alcohol to Aboriginal people, but which did not introduce any penalty for Aboriginal people possessing alcohol, and similar laws relating to firearms. As a final point on that line of argument, Barry referred to the writings of James Kent on the corresponding position under American law with respect to Native Americans. (Note: Reports of the case did not indicate which of Kent's writings Barry quoted.)

Barry then attempted to anticipate some of the counter-arguments that might be made. To the argument that someone denying the jurisdiction of a court must also indicate some jurisdiction that is competent, Barry said that the customary legal system of the Aboriginal people themselves was the correct jurisdiction. Barry indicated he was prepared to call witnesses to testify on the methods within the Aboriginal legal system of dealing with such matters, and also argued that although there were certainly differences between the Aboriginal and English legal systems, that did not mean that the former was not a valid jurisdiction.

To the argument that it would be anomalous to recognise two different jurisdictions within the one country, Barry referred to the case of Mostyn v Fabrigas. In that case, a native Minorquin had successfully sued the British governor John Mostyn after Mostyn exiled him from the island; Barry relied on it for the fact that both Spanish law and English law were accepted to coexist together on the island. Barry further argued that parts of the Brehon law of Ireland existed in parallel with the English law for several centuries after the Norman invasion of Ireland, that French law continued to be applied in French-speaking Canada, and Dutch law in the Cape Colony, and even reminded Judge Willis that "your honor dispensed the Danish civil law for several years in British Guiana."

Barry concluded his argument by saying to the prosecutor Croke that he "will not, though he were to erect on every hill throughout the district a gallows as lofty as that on which Haman expiated his guilt, reduce these people to the condition of willing, consenting, and convinced dependants on the British crown."

==== Prosecution ====
Croke, in reply, began with the proposition that:

"it is not an encroachment or abridgement of the natural rights of the inhabitants of an uncivilized country, that civilized persons should plant a colony in their territory, that is the territory of the uncivilized, provided the colonists so settling do so under sanction of the government of the mother country."

Croke argued – like Barry basing his argument on Vattel's The Law of Nations – that international law validated such acquisition of sovereignty over "uncivilised" peoples, providing that adequate territory were left to them for their sustenance, and said that that was certainly the case in the Australian colonies.

Croke argued that it was the location of the crime, and not the nationalities of the people involved, which determined the jurisdiction, and that anyone present in an English territory "owes a local allegiance to the Queen of England, receiving protection at her Majesty's hands whilst within the district, and consequently reciprocally bound by the laws that prevail within that district". Croke posed as a rhetorical question whether, supposing Bonjon had instead killed Yammowing in England, or similarly, supposing one Frenchman had killed another Frenchman in England, "my learned friend [could] deny that the slayer would be amenable to the law of England?"

Lastly, Croke advanced an argument "derived from the laws of nature herself", saying that the laws of a sovereign power must extend to everyone within the territory, in order to give effect to the maxim in Genesis 9:6 that "whosoever sheddeth man's blood, by man shall his blood be shed". This applied to all persons within a territory because all of them were also entitled to the protection of those laws.

== Judgment ==
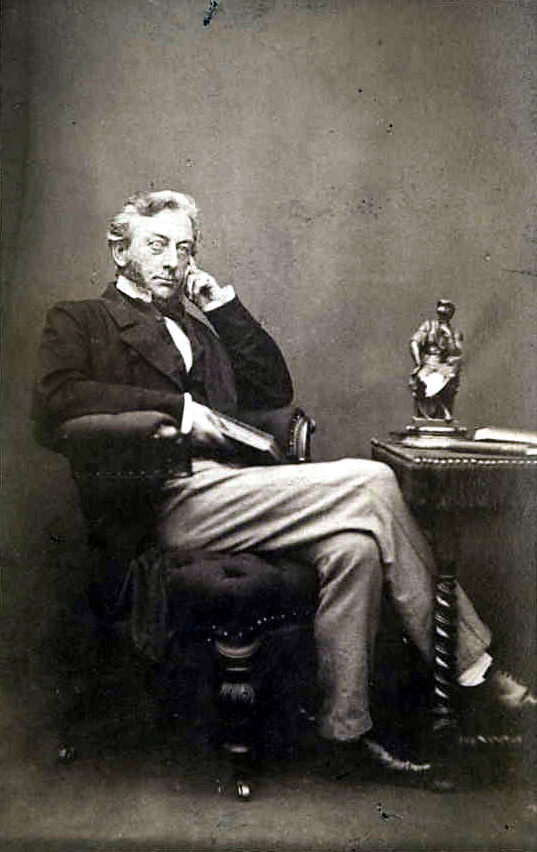
A photographic portrait of Justice Willis, c. 1863–1877.

Judge Willis opened his judgment by stating that "I do not consider myself bound by the opinion of either Mr. Chief Justice Forbes, Mr. Justice Burton, or Mr. Chief Justice Dowling in the present case." He then noted that it was not disputed that the colonial courts had jurisdiction over crimes committed by Aboriginal people against the colonists, or vice versa, giving several examples of such cases. He also emphasised the duty of a judge, not only to fully exercise their jurisdiction, but also to refrain from doing so where there is reasonable doubt about that jurisdiction.

Judge Willis frequently referred to the Select Committee of the House of Commons on Aborigines throughout his judgment. He quoted from the testimony before the Committee of William Broughton, the Anglican Bishop of Australia, who was of the view that the early settlers were wrong to presume that the Aboriginal people were lacking in intellect, that rather their way of life was attributable to their "love of erratic liberty". He also quoted from the submission of the Attorney-General of New South Wales Saxe Bannister, who had argued that the customary laws of the Aboriginal people ought to be studied and recorded, so that they could be followed and respected by the colonial courts in appropriate cases. From these and other opinions, the Judge concluded, it was evident that the Aboriginal people had their own legal system, and that treaties ought to be made with them.

Next, Judge Willis discussed the notable decline in Aboriginal population around the colonial settlements, as noted in the Select Committee's report, and posed the question that, if the Aboriginal people were indeed to be considered British subjects, subject to British laws and entitled to their protection, why had the executive government done nothing to help them, and why had the judiciary not "put forth the protecting arm of legal authority"? He noted the example of Batman's Treaty, an "attempted bargain" (Batman offered only a few supplies as consideration for a large area of land) which was "happily frustrated" by the administration in Sydney, and lamented that no official efforts had been made to secure a treaty with the various Aboriginal peoples, "no terms defined for their internal government, civilization, and protection."

Judge Willis defined the question to be considered as:

"[w]hether the sovereignty thus asserted... legally excludes the aborigines, according to the law of nations, as acknowledged and acted upon by the British Government, from the rightful sovereignty and occupancy of a reasonable portion of the soil, and destroys their existence as self governing communities, so entirely as to place them... in the unqualified condition of British subjects; or whether it has merely reduced them to the state of dependent allies, still retaining their own laws and usages, subject only to such restraints and qualified control as the safety of the colonists and the protection of the aborigines required".

The answer, he said, would largely depend on the way in which sovereignty was said to have been acquired. He observed that although the legal authorities claimed that sovereignty over Australia was acquired by occupation, the country was not vacant, but already occupied; nor had it been conquered or ceded under a treaty. Rather, Judge Willis said, sovereignty was actually acquired under the principle expounded by Vattel in his The Law of Nations, referred to by both the prosecution and the defence, that a 'civilised' people may take possession of territory occupied by 'uncivilised' people, provided they leave for them sufficient land for their sustenance.

The Judge next discussed the example of William Penn (an example noted also by Vattel) and his many negotiations with the Lenape Native Americans, but said that his example had "hitherto been neglected". The position of those Native Americans, he said, was that they had by treaty become dependent states, but according to Vattel, they had not in doing so surrendered their sovereignty. Considering the position of a dependent state that "does not resist the encroachments of the superior power... [that] preserves a profound silence when it may and ought to speak", the Judge said that over time such silence may become consent. However, the silence must be voluntary, and if such silence is the result of fear or oppression, then that is not the case. In any event, he concluded, the many violent clashes between the Aboriginal people and the white settlers "make it... sufficiently manifest that the Aboriginal tribes are neither a conquered people, nor have tacitly acquiesced in the supremacy of the settlers."

Citing the example of the Treaty of Waitangi, first signed on 6 February the preceding year, Judge Willis declared himself "quite at a loss to discover how the aborigines of New Zealand can be considered in a different light to those of Australia Felix." The amended Commission given to Captain Arthur Phillip had, after all, included within the definition of the colony of New South Wales most of New Zealand, and the Judge said that he could think of no reason why a similar treaty might be pursued in Australia, given that the rights of indigenous peoples within the same territory and under the same government could surely not be different. From a speech given by Governor of New South Wales George Gipps to the Legislative Council of New South Wales on 9 July 1840, on a bill relating to land grants in New Zealand, Judge Willis quoted long passages demonstrating Gipps' familiarity with American jurisprudence in relation to the relations between Native Americans and white settlers; just as Gipps considered the American experience relevant to the position of the Māori in New Zealand, in Judge Willis' view, it applied equally well to the Aboriginal people in Australia.

This was based on Judge Willis' view that sovereignty in Australia was acquired in the same way as in America. Yet, if the actual position was that Australia was acquired by conquest, then, the Judge said, there was another comparison to be made. In Jamaica, over which Britain had acquired sovereignty by conquest, a treaty was concluded in 1738 between British authorities and the Jamaican Maroons, one of the terms of which provided that if a crime was committed by a Maroon against a British subject, they would be subject to the British law, but British law had no jurisdiction over crimes between Maroons. Though the Maroons were not indigenous peoples, the treaty was nevertheless "[a] pretty strong acknowledgement of a rude and dependent community being permitted to govern itself by its own laws in a British colony", the Judge said. In a similar vein, Judge Willis cited the example of Saint Vincent, where the British, despite acquiring sovereignty by treaty from the French, nevertheless decided to enter into a peace treaty with the local Carib people.

Having compared the Australian situation with America, New Zealand, Jamaica and Saint Vincent, Judge Willis then drew a contrast with the areas under the British Raj. Those territories, he said, were certainly claimed by conquest, yet "the unchristian practice of Suttees and the Jughernaut were permitted to prevail"; but more pointedly, the Charter Act 1833 expressly gave the Governor-General of India powers to make, alter and repeal laws for both British and native inhabitants of India. "There is", the Judge said, "no express law, that I am aware of, that makes the Aborigines subject to our colonial code." He then recalled Barry's argument with respect to local alcohol and firearms laws.

Finally, Judge Willis (recalling Croke's argument as to the Frenchmen in England) said that this situation was not the same as that of a foreigner traveling in another country, who would surely be subject to that country's laws; indeed, he said, in Australia "the colonists and not the aborigines are the foreigners; the former are exotics, the latter indigenous, the latter the native sovereigns of the soil, the former uninvited intruders."

Judge Willis concluded that:

"From these premises rapidly indeed collected, I am at present strongly led to infer that the Aborigines must be considered and dealt with, until some further provision be made, as distinct, though dependent tribes governed among themselves by their own rude laws and customs. If this be so, I strongly doubt the propriety of my assuming the exercise of jurisdiction in the case before me."

However, he added that the question was of too great import to be resolved immediately, and unless the parties agreed to proceed on the footing that the question was not waived by so doing, the proceedings would be adjourned. He concluded:

"I desire to see the state of the Aborigines of Australia improved, I desire to see them freed from the yoke of error; to see the duties of humanity amply and practically fulfilled; to see all due protection extended to this unhappy race — the protection of their rights by laws adapted to their capacity and suited to their wants — the protection of all equal and all powerful justice."

== Consequences ==
Following delivery of the judgment, counsel for the parties agreed that the trial would proceed, without prejudice to the question of jurisdiction, which Judge Willis would consider further. The court then adjourned for the day. On returning the following morning (17 September), there was debate about the way in which depositions from the witnesses had been taken in Geelong, specifically, whether they were taken in Bonjon's presence, and whether Bonjon had the opportunity to cross-examine the witnesses. Evidence was also given that Bonjon had not had the proceedings translated for him adequately, and that as such he did not understand the nature of the case against him. Under these circumstances, the Crown Prosecutor Croke decided not to proceed with the case, and Bonjon was remanded until the following month's session. The following month, Bonjon was discharged.

Several months after the case, on 15 December 1841, Bonjon's defence counsel Redmond Barry accepted the position of Standing Counsel for the Aborigines, for which he was paid three guineas for each case. Shortly after that appointment, Barry defended five Palawa (including Truganini and Tunnerminnerwait) who were alleged to have murdered two whalers; Barry advanced a similar argument to that in this case, arguing that the five were not British subjects and that the court had no jurisdiction (and that the jury ought to include Aboriginal people). However, Barry lost the case, and two of the five were hanged.

Judge Willis' decision was in apparent conflict with an earlier decision of a full bench of the Supreme Court of New South Wales in the 1836 case of R v Murrell; it was this case that Judge Willis was referring to at the beginning of his judgment when he declared that he did not consider himself bound by decisions of Chief Justice Forbes and Justices Burton and Dowling. That case also concerned the alleged murder of one Aboriginal man by another, and the question of whether the court had jurisdiction, the court ultimately deciding that it did. Dowling – Chief Justice by the time of this case – criticised Judge Willis' decision, saying that R v Murrell was the authoritative case on the question, a view shared by Governor Gipps and the authorities in Britain. Bruce Kercher suggests that, if Bonjon had not ultimately been discharged, and instead tried and found guilty, the jurisdiction point would have been heard by a full court in Sydney, which almost certainly would have overturned Judge Willis' position. Gipps was so displeased that he censured Judge Willis. He also wrote to the Colonial Secretary Lord Stanley on 24 January 1842, requesting that a law be passed to ensure that colonial courts had jurisdiction over crimes committed between Aboriginal persons.

Ann Galbally has argued that, rather than his true concern being for the Aboriginal people, Judge Willis' aim was to embarrass the government and his judicial rivals in Sydney by way of the decision. Judge Willis had long been in conflict with his colleagues in judiciary and government, first in Upper Canada, then in British Guiana and also in Sydney. Kercher, however, argues that Willis' views were drawn from the same stock as the abolitionist movement that had recently ended slavery in the British West Indies, and said that he "was the most important legal official in colonial Australia who took seriously the idea that Aborigines had their own laws and customs".

Stanley Yeo, in contrast to Galbally's assessment, attributes the difference between this case and the decision in R v Murrell to Judge Willis' consideration of which, if any, of the valid methods of acquiring sovereignty were used by the British when establishing their settlements in Australia; this was not considered by the court in Murrell. Yeo has also compared the decision in Bonjon with the 1992 decision of the High Court of Australia in Mabo v Queensland, in the sense that both decisions accepted British settlement in Australia, and the introduction of the English common law, but held that the act of settlement alone was "insufficient to extinguish native laws and jurisdictions". However the Mabo case, Yeo says, also recognised "that settlement can take the enlarged form of establishing sovereignty over a territory inhabited by natives who were not already subject to the jurisdiction of another European nation-state", and this was the method by which sovereignty over Australia was established.

The decision of the full bench in R v Murrell was published in 1986 by lawyer and soldier James Gordon Legge, along with other selected cases from 1825 to 1862, whereas R v Bonjon was never published in a law report. Whether because R v Murrell was decided by a full bench, or because it was the case that was made available to practising lawyers, it remained the preferred position in legal sources throughout the twentieth century. Kercher has argued that the decision in R v Bonjon (along with the 1829 decision in R v Ballard) "deserve closer attention, not least because they are more consistent with the writings of Vattel on the rights of nomadic peoples and, as the judgment of Willis J in Bonjon shows, because they are more consistent with the treatment of native peoples in other jurisdictions."

== See also ==
- Bob Barrett (Indigenous Australian)
