= Yelland (disambiguation) =

Yelland is a village in North Devon, England.

Yelland may also refer to:

- Ely Airport or Yelland Field, an airport in Ely, Nevada, United States
- Yelland Stone Rows, an ancient double row of megalithic standing stones in Devon

== People with the surname ==
- David Yelland (journalist) (born 1963), English journalist and newspaper editor
- David Yelland (actor), British actor
- Hannah Yelland (born 1976), British actress
- Herbert Yelland (1878–1962), Australian politician
- Lewis Yelland Andrews (died 1937), British district commissioner for Galilee (assassinated)
