= William Jeffcott =

Australian judge

Sir William Jeffcott

Supreme Court Judge at Port Phillip
- In office 1 July 1843 – December 1844
- Preceded by: John Walpole Willis
- Succeeded by: Roger Therry

Recorder of Penang, Singapore, Malacca
- In office 1850–1855
- Preceded by: Sir Christopher Rawlinson
- Succeeded by: Sir Richard McCausland

Personal details
- Born: 1800 Ireland
- Died: 23 October 1855 (aged 54)
- Resting place: Penang, Malaysia
- Relatives: John Jeffcott (brother)
- Education: Trinity College, Dublin
- Occupation: Barrister; judge

Sir William Jeffcott (1800 – 22 October 1855) was an Anglo-Irish barrister, a judge of the Supreme Court of New South Wales for the District of Port Phillip and Recorder of Prince of Wales Island, Malacca and Singapore.

== Background ==
Born in Ireland, he obtained a bachelor of arts from Trinity College, Dublin and in 1828 he was called to the Irish Bar. In 1836, his brother John Jeffcott became the first judge of the Supreme Court of South Australia. In June 1843, Jeffcott migrated to the Colony of New South Wales.

== Judge ==
On 24 June 1843, John Willis was notified that he had been appointed by Governor Gipps as the judge of the Supreme Court of New South Wales for the District of Port Phillip and Jeffcott was promptly appointed to replace him. In February 1844 Willis appealed to the Privy Council. Jeffcott was concerned that if Willis was found to have been invalidly removed, then his own appointment may also have been invalid. Of particular concern was that if he imposed the death penalty, he may be guilty of murder. It has been doubted whether Jeffcott's concerns were well founded, given the long standing-protection of de facto officers. Jeffoctt resigned in December 1844 and was replaced by Roger Therry.

== Recorder ==
Jeffcott returned to practice at the Irish Bar. In 1850, he was appointed Recorder of Prince of Wales Island, Malacca and Singapore, to replace Sir Christopher Rawlinson who had been appointed Chief Justice of the Supreme Court of Judicature at Madras.

Jeffcott died of dysentery on 23 October 1855.

== See also ==
- Judiciary of Australia
- List of Judges of the Supreme Court of Victoria
- List of Judges of the Supreme Court of New South Wales

Legal offices
Preceded by John Walpole Willis	Judge of the Supreme Court of NSW; District of Port Phillip; 1843 – 1844	Succeeded by Roger Therry
