= John Walpole Willis =

Australian judge

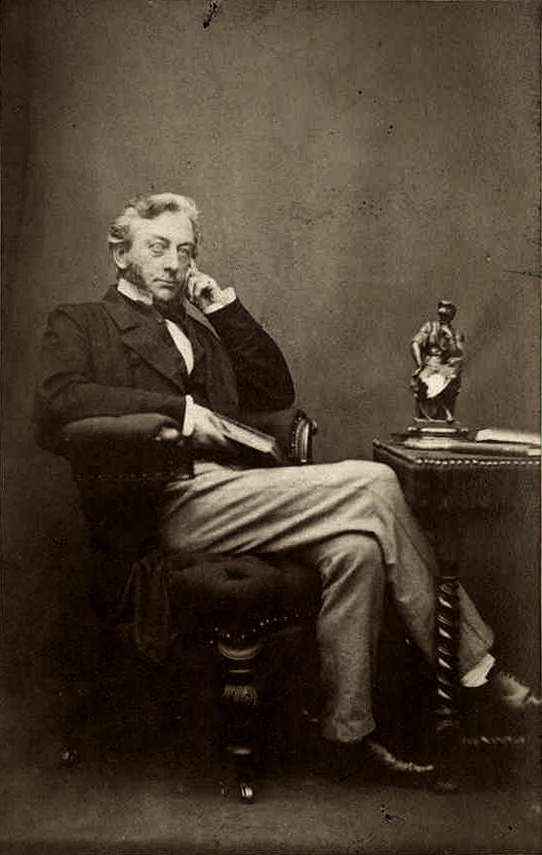
Photographic portrait of Willis, c. 1863–1877

John Walpole Willis (4 January 1793 – 10 September 1877) was a British judge of Upper Canada, British Guiana (as acting Chief Justice), the Supreme Court of New South Wales, and resident judge at Port Phillip, Melbourne.

== Early life ==
The second son of Captain William Willis (of the 13th Light Dragoons) and his wife Mary Hamilton Smyth (of the family of the Viscounts Strangford), Willis was born at Holyhead, Anglesey, where his father was stationed. He was a descendant of the Willises of Suffolk and Cambridgeshire – from whom descended the Willys baronets of Fen Ditton – through his grandfather, Joseph Willis of Wakefield, Yorkshire, where the family had been settled since the seventeenth century. Willis was educated at Rugby (alongside his elder brother, William Downes Willis), Charterhouse (whence he was expelled for taking a leading part in a school rebellion alongside a fellow student, Wood), and as a fellow-commoner at Trinity Hall, Cambridge, where he took an MA. He was called to the English bar from Gray's Inn, and practised as a chancery barrister. In 1820–1 he published his Pleadings in Equity, and in 1827 A Practical Treatise on the Duties and Responsibilities of Trustees. In 1823, the Earl of Strathmore applied to Willis for legal advice; while a frequent guest in the Earl's household, Willis met his daughter, Lady Mary Isabella. They married the following year, and settled with Willis's widowed mother and his sister at Hendon. Their son, Robert Bruce Willis, was born in 1826.

== Upper Canada and British Guiana ==
In 1827, with his father-in-law's endorsement, Willis was appointed a puisne judge of the Court of King's bench in Upper Canada, with the expectation being that a Court of Chancery would be established shortly after at which he would be the judge. Willis and his family arrived in Canada on 17 September. At first he and his wife were welcomed into the social and legal life of the colony. Willis had a low opinion of John Beverley Robinson, the Attorney General, having previously observed "that any proposition that did not originate with himself was not generally attended with his approbation". Willis allied himself with a group of lawyers who were chief opposition spokesmen: John Rolph, William Warren Baldwin and his son Robert, and Marshall Spring Bidwell. Another friend was the novelist John Galt, at that time Secretary of the Canada Company.

Willis returned to England in July with his mother (during which time they also stayed at Tyrella House, Dundrum Bay, County Down, the home of his mother's cousin, Rev. George Hamilton, father of the politician George Alexander Hamilton), leaving his sister, wife and son behind in the care of his friends. This separation led to the dissolution of his marriage; his wife, in May 1829, leaving her son with a maid and absconding with an infantry lieutenant.

He was appointed Vice-President of the Court of Civil and Criminal Justice. He served as first puisne judge, i.e. second in rank after the Chief Justice, Charles Wray. At first, Willis seemed well-suited to Guiana; he avoided becoming embroiled in local politics, and enjoyed close and cordial relations with a number of the colony's influential people. Following the emancipation of slaves there, many former slave owners continued to whip their former slaves; when tried for such offences, these former slave owners were recommended for acquittal by the Assessors who sat with the Supreme Court, these Assessors themselves being former slave owners. Willis, however, held the former masters guilty, and this caused ill feeling against him. In the case of Damon, a chief leader of an uprising of former slaves, Willis was the sole member of the Court dissenting from a sentence of death. The strenuous protests Willis made on this matter, grounded in English law in contrast to the Roman–Dutch law prevalent at British Guiana, are thought to have adversely impacted his health. Damon was hanged.

In 1835 he was passed over for promotion to Chief Justice there in favour of Jeffery Hart Bent, formerly the Chief Justice of St Lucia, and a similarly divisive figure, despite Willis having served as first puisne judge under the previous Chief Justice, Charles Wray, and having been acting chief justice on Wray's retirement; within three months, embittered by this and experiencing chronic liver trouble (likely malarial, or related to amoebic dysentery), he returned to England on sick leave. During this period, he married Ann Susanna Kent Bund, daughter and heir of Col. Thomas Henry Bund, of Wick House, Worcestershire. When Willis was due to return, he was, at the insistence of the Governor of British Guiana, instead persuaded by the Colonial Office to take a posting in Sydney as a judge of the Supreme Court of New South Wales.

== New South Wales and Port Phillip ==
In October 1842 Gipps stated:

differences have again broken out between Mr J. Walpole Willis ... and the judges of the supreme court of Sydney ... for many months the town of Melbourne has been kept in a state of continued excitement by the proceedings of Mr Justice Willis and the extraordinary nature of the harangues, which he is in the habit of delivering from the bench.

In February 1843 Gipps recommended to Lord Stanley that Willis should be removed from his position. On 26 June 1843 Gipps summarily removed Willis, who became the second Australian judge to be removed from office. Willis left Melbourne for London in July 1843 and appealed to the Privy Council. In August 1846 the Privy Council held that while there were sufficient grounds for Willis's removal, he should have been given an opportunity to be heard.

== Late life ==
In 1850 Willis published a volume On the Government of the British Colonies (noted in The Athenaeum magazine as 'not unworthy of the attention of those who are seeking ... a way out of our present colonial difficulties'), and afterwards lived in retirement at Wick Episcopi, Worcestershire, serving as a Deputy Lieutenant and Justice of the Peace for the county. He died on 10 September 1877, survived by the son of his first marriage, and by a son John William Willis-Bund and two daughters by the second marriage. Amongst his descendants were Francis MacCarthy Willis Bund, an Anglican clergyman and Chaplain of Balliol College, Oxford, Frederick Smythe Willis, the sometime mayor of Willoughby, New South Wales, and founder member of the Institute of Chartered Accountants Australia, and Leslie R. H. Willis, engineer and archaeologist.

== Character ==
Despite his considerable ability, Willis was noted to have a naturally rather difficult temperament, which was not improved by his clashes with colleagues over what he perceived as their lax moral standards. The novelist Rolf Boldrewood, Willis's neighbour while posted in Sydney, described his 'genial and gracious' personality while shooting, which when in court became "impatience of contradiction ... acerbity of manner, and ... infirmity of temper" "painful to witness and dangerous to encounter". The Melbourne journalist and author Garryowen recorded: "Such was his irascibility and so often was the Court the arena of unseemly squabbles that people who had no business there attended to see 'the fun', for, as there was no theatre in town, Judge Willis was reckoned to be 'as good as a play'". Nonetheless, he was known for his brilliance and wit, as well as "a humaneness that was unfashionable, even unsavoury, for the times", as shown by his provision of roast beef and plum pudding to all the prisoners in Melbourne jail on New Year's Day 1842. This enlightened attitude extended to his treatment of the black populations of British Guiana and Australia with whom he dealt; in the case of the former, Willis held former slave masters to account for their mistreatment of their former slaves, and fought for imprisonment, rather than the death penalty, for the leader of an uprising of former slaves. In Australia, Willis addressed jurors with a warning against prejudice during the trial of Aboriginal Australians for murder, and in the case of R v Bonjon, went as far as stating his doubts regarding the right of colonial administrators to interfere with the customs of the Aboriginal people; recognising the existence of their own legal system, he concluded that treaties ought to be made with them. Noting the decline in Aboriginal population around the colonial settlements, Willis questioned why, if they were to be considered British subjects, no efforts appeared to have been made by the Executive Government or the judiciary to protect and support them, citing exploitation of the Aboriginal people as in Batman's Treaty. Bruce Kercher considers that Willis 'was the most important legal official in colonial Australia who took seriously the idea that Aborigines had their own laws and customs.'

Despite a "haughty and imperious" manner, Willis was nonetheless popular with the public, receiving strong support from certain quarters. He was regarded as "a martyr to his upright and liberal principles"; his removal "tended greatly to embitter public opinion, and was unquestionably a strong factor in producing the discontent which ultimately found expression in open rebellion". Henry James Morgan, author of 'Sketches of celebrated Canadians and persons connected with Canada', considered that Willis "received such base and unprincipled treatment at [the hands of those in power] for no reason but because he did his duty well, was an English lawyer of great legal ability and knowledge; and also a gentleman of much goodness and amiability of character ... he displayed great judgement, and an accurate acquaintance with his official duties, and was considered an honour to the bench (heretofore not in very high repute) not only for his talents and merits as a lawyer, but for his very excellent disposition, and for the manner in which he maintained the dignity and impartiality of the court ... such a man was not in favour with the omnipotent power that ruled the upper province; and a strong dislike was taken against him." George Wright, in "Wattle blossoms: some of the grave and gay reminiscences of an old colonist" characterised Willis in his time in Australia as "one of those noble souled men who feared nothing so much as an accusing conscience, and therefore dared on all occasions to speak truth for truth's sake". John Charles Dent, in 'The Canadian Portrait Gallery volume I', considered Willis "a gentleman of spotless character, kind and amiable manners, and wide and various learning. He was beyond comparison the ablest jurist who, up to that point, had sat on the judicial bench".

== Notes ==
Legal offices
New office	Judge of the Supreme Court of NSW; District of Port Phillip; 1841–1843	Succeeded by William Jeffcott
