= Bob Barrett (Indigenous Australian) =

Indigenous Australian tracker

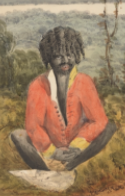
- Extract of a painting showing an Awabakal man, probably Bob Barrett, in a soldier's jacket
- Born: c. 1795; Lake Macquarie region
- Died: 15 October 1833; Port Stephens
- Other names: Monunggal, Robert Barrett, Bob Barratt, Bob Barnett, Ballard.

Bob Barrett or Monunggal (c. 1795 – 15 October 1833) was a notable Awabakal Indigenous Australian from the area around Lake Macquarie and Newcastle, New South Wales. He was a trusted part of the British military establishment at the Newcastle and Port Macquarie convict settlements, where he was employed in the tracking and capture of escaped convicts. He was also involved in a famous court case which set a precedent for legal pluralism in Australia, and was later given a non-commissioned officer rank in an abortive Aboriginal paramilitary unit designed to engage with Aboriginal Tasmanians resisting British colonisation.

== Early life ==
Not much is known about Barrett's early life, apart from that he was born in the Newcastle or Lake Macquarie region of New South Wales around the year 1795 and is regarded as being part of the Awabakal group of Indigenous Australians. His traditional name is mentioned as being Monunggal. As a young man he was regarded as powerful and intelligent by members of the British military establishment at the Newcastle penal colony and was utilised in tracking down and capturing escaped convicts around the period of 1817 to 1821. He was also trained in the use of firearms and became a very good marksman.

== Port Macquarie ==
In 1821, Barrett together with two other well-known Awabakal men in Biraban and Jemmy Jackass (a.k.a. Werakata), were assigned to be taken to Port Macquarie to assist in the establishment of a new convict settlement there. Captain Francis Allman, the first Commandant of the Port Macquarie penal colony, utilised Barrett, Biraban and Jemmy to help establish communication with the local Birpai people and, similar to Newcastle, used to track down and capture escaped convicts. They were given firearms and the informal rank of 'bush constables'.

Barrett, or Monunggal as he was sometimes known, became especially well-regarded by Allman, and was given the title of 'Chief of the Port Macquarie Blacks' even though he was not from the region. By 1823, Barrett had been involved in a number of escaped convict captures, including one where he shot a convict dead. His name was subsequently feared by the prisoners.

Bushrangers had also started to raid the region by 1825, and Barrett was again prominent in the military expeditions to capture or kill them.

== R v Ballard (Barrett) murder trial ==
In February 1829, Barrett and several other Awabakal men were staying in Sydney and engaging in a pub crawl around The Rocks and Circular Quay. They encountered a drunk Aboriginal man of the Eora clan named Borondire (a.k.a. 'Dirty Dick'), whom they dragged to the shore near Bennelong Point and beat to death with waddies. Barrett, who was conspicuous in his signature outfit of an old soldier's jacket, and two of his associates were soon apprehended and found guilty of murder by a hastily convened coroner's court.

Barrett was placed in custody, but by June the Chief Justice of New South Wales, Francis Forbes, brought his case to the Supreme Court in order to discharge Barrett. Forbes' reason for this was to absolve the courts of any responsibility over "the quarrels between the aboriginal natives". Forbes further stated that:

to interfere with the savage tribes, whose countries we have taken possession of, in occupying a foreign country, the laws that are imported have reference only to the subjects of the parent state; I am not aware that those laws were ever applied to transactions taking place between the original natives themselves. This is founded on a wise principle. The savage and the social state are widely different. In the social state every individual sustaining an injury has the benefit of the collected wisdom of society to take his complaint into consideration. But it is not so among savages; in such a state, the passions become the ministers of justice. Amongst themselves the greatest injustice would arise, if that brute force to which they have recourse were to be restrained by the laws by which civilized society is bound. Besides, if we interfere in cases of acts of oppression on the persons of the aboriginal natives, committed amongst themselves, we must also interfere in questions of property, which very often give rise to those disputes, and thus have to administer justice in all their matters. For these reason, I do not think it just to apply our laws in cases arising solely between the natives themselves, and am of opinion that this man should be discharged from custody.

Barrett was subsequently released and was soon returned to Port Macquarie.

This case, often mistakenly known as R v Ballard when its correct title is R v Barrett, revealed the unwillingness of the British to protect Aboriginal Australians under their legal system, or even to recognise them as more than 'savages', let alone as British subjects. The case also set an important precedent of legal pluralism in Australia, which, although somewhat overturned by a subsequent similar case called R v Murrell in 1836, remains relevant in modern Australian legal cases involving traditional Aboriginal practices of inter se retribution. In 1841, the findings of the similar legal proceeding of R v Bonjon seemed to confirm the outcome of the Barrett case over that of Murrell.

== Later life ==
By 1830, Barrett had returned to Port Macquarie, where he was once more employed at the penal colony, capturing escaped convicts and otherwise assisting the military personnel there. He was involved in a sea rescue, where he and several other Aboriginal men, swam out and saved seven convicts and soldier whose boat had overturned in the harbour.

In the same year, Barrett was given the title of 'captain' and placed in a non-commissioned officer role over a detachment of eleven other armed Aboriginal men. This force was to proceed to Van Diemen's Land under the leadership George James MacDonald to fight against the Aboriginal Tasmanians in the Black War. However, this unit was disbanded before it was deployed.

== Death ==
Barrett died at Port Stephens in 1833 from smallpox.

== See also ==
- List of Indigenous Australian historical figures
