= L. Perry Curtis =

American historian (1932–2019)

Lewis Perry Curtis Jr. (June 7, 1932 – April 9, 2019) was an American historian specializing in 19th-century Irish history. He also covered modern culture and media.

== Early life and education ==
L. Perry Curtis was born in London, England, the son of Lewis Perry Curtis, associate professor of history at Yale (1900–1976), and his wife, Bryn Mawr College-graduate Jeanet Ellinwood (née Sullivan), daughter of an insurance company executive. Curtis was educated at the Foote School, at New Haven, Connecticut, Brooks School, at North Andover, Massachusetts, then at Yale and Christ Church, Oxford, transferring after two years to Nuffield College, Oxford. He spent his summers as a copy-boy at The New York Times, at which his maternal grandfather and an uncle had been employed.

== Career ==
Curtis wrote a number of books on 19th-century Ireland, including two books on political cartooning. Apes and Angels: The Irishman in Victorian Caricature covers how the Irish were caricatured by English and American cartoonists. Images of Erin in the Age of Parnell covers how Irish cartoonists depicted the female personification of Ireland, Erin. This was one of his most recognized books.

Curtis had a teaching career of four decades, including at Princeton, the University of California at Berkeley, and Brown University, from which he retired as professor of history in 2001. Most of his professional career was spent at Brown University, where he became emeritus professor of history. In 1959, he married Alison (b. 1934), daughter of Francis Leader MacCarthy-Willis-Bund, a Chaplain, Fellow and Dean of Balliol College, Oxford, in 1959. Before her marriage she had been private secretary at Trinity Hall, Cambridge. Her great-grandfather was the writer John William Willis-Bund.

== Selected books ==
Curtis wrote the following books:

- Coercion and Conciliation in Ireland 1880-1892: A Study in Conservative Unionism, 1963.
- Anglo-Saxons and Celts: A Study of Anti-Irish Prejudice in Victorian England, 1968.
- The Historian's Workshop: Original Essays by Sixteen Historians, 1970.
- Apes and Angels: The Irishman in Victorian Caricature, 1971 (rev. ed. 1997).
- Images of Erin in the Age of Parnell, 2000.
- Jack the Ripper and the London Press, 2001. ISBN 0-300-08872-8
- The Depiction of Eviction in Ireland 1845–1910, 2011.
- Notice to Quit: The Great Irish Famine Evictions, 2015.
