= Jack the Ripper and the London Press =

2001 book by L. Perry Curtis

- Author: L. Perry Curtis
- Subject: Media studies
- Publisher: Yale University Press
- Publication date: 2001
- Pages: 354
- ISBN: 0-300-08872-8

Jack the Ripper and the London Press is a 2001 book by American historian L. Perry Curtis. The book analyzes how Victorian era British media covered Jack the Ripper and the Whitechapel murders.

== Commentary and reviews ==
- Adams, Jed (February 9, 2002). "Saturday Review: Books: Sisters of the abyss: Jad Adams discovers how the Ripper was reported: Jack the Ripper and the London Press by L Perry Curtis". The Guardian.
- Baylen, J. O. (2003). "Review of Jack the Ripper and the London Press, L. Perry Curtis Jr". Victorian Periodicals Review. 36 (3): 266–267. ISSN 0709-4698.
- Colowick, Susan (October 1, 2001). "Jack the Ripper and the London Press review". Library Journal. 126 (16): 114.
- Davenport-Hines, Richard (4 April 2002). "Horrid Mutilation! Read all about it!". London Review of Books. 24 (07). ISSN 0260-9592.
- Emsley, Clive (2002). "Review of Jack the Ripper and the London Press, L. Perry Curtis, Jr". Crime, Histoire & Sociétés / Crime, History & Societies. 6 (2): 144–145. ISSN 1422-0857.
- Gross, John (February 4, 2002). "Lost in the myths: [A Edition]". Evening Standard: 46.
- Hampton, Mark (April 2004). "Rethinking the "New Journalism, 1850s–1930s". Journal of British Studies. 43 (2): 278–290. doi:10.1086/380954.
- Jakeman, Jane (February 2, 2002). "Books: Faces of the monster in the mirror ; The figure of Jack the Ripper has become a gory reflection of our fears. Jane Jakeman looks for a clearer image". The Independent.
- Karloff, Kim (2002). "Jack the Ripper and the London Press". Journalism and Mass Communication Quarterly. 79 (3): 776–777.
- Knelman, Judith (2003). "Jack the Ripper and the London Press. New Haven, Conn.: Yale University Press". Albion. 35 (2): 335–336. doi:10.2307/4054189.
- McAllister, David (March 8, 2002). "Jack the Ripper and the London Press review". The Times Literary Supplement (5162): 12.
- Montwieler, Katherine (1 September 2004). "Reviews". Nineteenth-Century Contexts. 26 (3): 289–291. doi:10.1080/0890549042000280829#d1e105.
- Murdoch, Lydia (2003). "Review of Jack the Ripper and the London Press, L. Perry Curtis Jr". Victorian Studies. 45 (4): 760–762. ISSN 0042-5222.
- Owen, Alex (2004). "Review of Jack the Ripper and the London Press". The Journal of Modern History. 76 (3): 685–686. doi:10.1086/425460. ISSN 0022-2801.
- Sacco, Vincent F. (2002). "Review of Jack the Ripper and the London Press, L. Perry Curtis, Jr". Contemporary Sociology. 31 (6): 769–770. doi:10.2307/3089987. ISSN 0094-3061.
- Wilson, David A. (2003). "Review of Jack the Ripper and the London Press, L. Perry Curtis, Jr". The Journal of Interdisciplinary History. 34 (1): 76–77. ISSN 0022-1953.
