= E. P. Thompson =

English historian & activist (1924–1993)

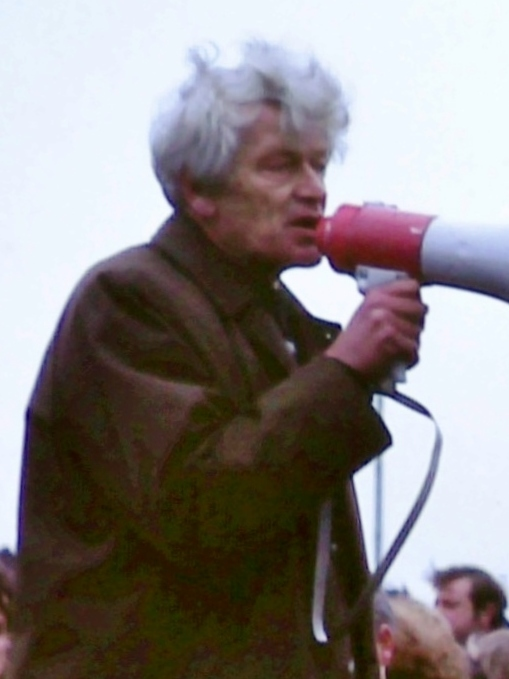
- Thompson at a 1980 anti-nuclear weapons rally in Oxford
- Born: Edward Palmer Thompson; 3 February 1924; Oxford, England
- Died: 28 August 1993 (aged 69); Upper Wick, Worcestershire, England
- Known for: The Making of the English Working Class
- Spouse: Dorothy Towers (m. 1948)
- Children: 3
- Father: Edward John Thompson

Academic background
- Education: Corpus Christi College, Cambridge
- Academic advisor: Kenneth Pickthorn
- Influences: Karl Marx; William Morris; William Blake

Academic work
- Discipline: History
- School or tradition: Democratic socialism Marxist humanism New Left
- Institutions: University of Warwick (until 1971); University of Leeds

Edward Palmer Thompson (3 February 1924 – 28 August 1993) was an English historian, writer, socialist and peace campaigner. He is best known for his historical work on the radical movements in the late 18th and early 19th centuries, in particular The Making of the English Working Class (1963).

In 1966, Thompson coined the term "history from below" to describe his approach to social history, which became one of the most consequential developments within the global history discipline. History from below arose from the Communist Party Historians Group and its work to popularise historical materialism. Thompson's work is considered by some to have been among the most important contributions to social history in the latter twentieth-century, with a global impact, including on scholarship in Asia and Africa. In a 2011 poll by History Today magazine, he was named the second most important historian of the previous 60 years, behind only Fernand Braudel.

== Early life ==
E. P. Thompson was born in Oxford to Methodist missionary parents: His father, Edward John Thompson (1886–1946), was a poet and admirer of the Nobel Prize–winning poet Rabindranath Tagore. His older brother was William Frank Thompson (1920–1944), a British officer in the Second World War, who was captured and shot aiding the Bulgarian anti-fascist partisans. Edward Thompson and his mother wrote There is a Spirit in Europe: A Memoir of Frank Thompson (1947). This out of print memoir was re-released by Brittunculi Records & Books in 2024. Thompson would later write another book about his brother, published posthumously in 1996.

Thompson attended two private schools, The Dragon School in Oxford and Kingswood School in Bath. Like many he left school in 1941 to fight in the Second World War. He served in a tank unit in the Italian campaign, including at the fourth battle of Cassino.

Thompson entered Corpus Christi College, Cambridge, in 1941, but left in 1942 to join the army. After the war he returned to Corpus to study History and graduated in 1946. He joined the Communist Party of Great Britain while at Cambridge. In 1946, Thompson formed the Communist Party Historians Group with Christopher Hill, Eric Hobsbawm, Rodney Hilton, Dona Torr, and others. In 1952 they launched the journal Past and Present.

== Scholarship ==
=== 1950s: William Morris ===
Thompson's first major work of scholarship was his biography of William Morris, written while he was a member of the Communist Party. Subtitled From Romantic to Revolutionary, it was part of an effort by the Communist Party Historians' Group, inspired by Torr, to emphasise the domestic roots of Marxism in Britain at a time when the Communist Party was under attack for always following the Moscow line. It was also an attempt to take Morris back from the critics who for more than 50 years had emphasised his art and downplayed his politics.

Although Morris's political work is well to the fore, Thompson also used his literary talents to comment on aspects of Morris's work, such as his early Romantic poetry, which had previously received relatively little consideration. As Thompson noted in his preface to the second edition (1976), the first edition (1955) appears to have received relatively little attention from the literary establishment because of its then-unfashionable Marxist point of view. However, the somewhat rewritten second edition was much better received.

Thompson launched the dissident Marxist journal The New Reasoner in the summer of 1957. The publication would merge to form New Left Review in 1960.

After Nikita Khrushchev's "secret speech" to the 20th Congress of the Communist Party of the Soviet Union in 1956, which revealed that the Soviet party leadership had long been aware of Stalin's crimes, Thompson (with John Saville and others) started a dissident publication inside the CP, called The Reasoner. Six months later, he and most of his comrades left the party in disgust at the Soviet invasion of Hungary.

But Thompson remained what he called a "socialist humanist". With Saville and others, he set up the New Reasoner, a journal that sought to develop a democratic socialist alternative to what its editors considered the ossified official Marxism of the Communist and Trotskyist parties and the managerialist cold war social democracy of the Labour Party and its international allies. The New Reasoner was the most important organ of what became known as the "New Left", an informal movement of dissident leftists closely associated with the nascent movement for nuclear disarmament in the late 1950s and early 1960s.

The New Reasoner combined with the Universities and Left Review to form New Left Review in 1960, though Thompson and others fell out with the group around Perry Anderson who took over the journal in 1962. The fashion ever since has been to describe the Thompson et al. New Left as "the first New Left" and the Anderson et al. group, which by 1968 had embraced Tariq Ali and various Trotskyists, as the second.

=== Early-1960s: The Making of the English Working Class ===
Thompson's most influential work was and remains The Making of the English Working Class, published in 1963 while he was working at the University of Leeds. The massive book, over 800 pages, was a watershed in the foundation of the field of social history. By exploring the ordinary cultures of working people through their previously ignored documentary remains, Thompson told the forgotten history of the first working-class political left in the world in the late-18th and early-19th centuries. Reflecting on the importance of the book for its 50th anniversary, Emma Griffin explained that Thompson "uncovered details about workshop customs and rituals, failed conspiracies, threatening letters, popular songs, and union club cards. He took what others had regarded as scraps from the archive and interrogated them for what they told us about the beliefs and aims of those who were not on the winning side. Here, then, was a book that rambled over aspects of human experience that had never before had their historian."

The Making of the English Working Class had a profound effect on the shape of British historiography, and still endures as a staple on university reading lists more than 50 years after its first publication in 1963. Writing for the Times Higher Education in 2013, Robert Colls recalled the power of Thompson's book for his generation of young British leftists:

I bought my first copy in 1968 – a small, fat bundle of Pelican with a picture of a Yorkshire miner on the front – and I still have it, bandaged up and exhausted by the years of labour. From the first of its 900-odd pages, I knew, and my friends at the University of Sussex knew, that this was something else. We talked about it in the bar and on the bus and in the refectory queue. Imagine that: young male students more interested in a book than in gooseberry tart and custard.

In his preface to this book, E.P. Thompson set out his approach to writing history from below, "I am seeking to rescue the poor stockinger, the Luddite cropper, the "obsolete" hand-loom weaver, the "Utopian" artisan, and even the deluded follower of Joanna Southcott, from the enormous condescension of posterity. Their crafts and traditions may have been dying. Their hostility to the new industrialism may have been backward-looking. Their communitarian ideals may have been fantasies. Their insurrectionary conspiracies may have been foolhardy. But they lived through these times of acute social disturbance, and we did not. Their aspirations were valid in terms of their own experience; and, if they were casualties of history, they remain, condemned in their own lives, as casualties."

Thompson's thought was also original and significant because of the way he defined "class." To Thompson, class was not a structure, but a relationship:

And class happens when some men, as a result of common experiences (inherited or shared), feel and articulate the identity of their interests as between themselves, and as against other men whose interests are different from (and usually opposed to) theirs. The class experience is largely determined by the productive relations into which men are born—or enter involuntarily. Class-consciousness is the way in which these experiences are handled in cultural terms: embodied in traditions, value-systems, ideas, and institutional forms. If the experience appears as determined, class-consciousness does not. We can see a logic in the responses of similar occupational groups undergoing similar experiences, but we cannot predicate any law. Consciousness of class arises in the same way in different times and places, but never in just the same way.

By re-defining class as a relationship that changed over time, Thompson proceeded to demonstrate how class was worthy of historical investigation. He opened the gates for a generation of labour historians, such as David Montgomery and Herbert Gutman, who made similar studies of the American working classes.

A major work of research and synthesis, the book was also important in historiographical terms: with it, Thompson demonstrated the power of a historical Marxism rooted in the experience of real flesh-and-blood workers. Thompson wrote the book while living in Siddal, Halifax, West Yorkshire and based some of the work on his experiences with the local Halifax population.

In later essays, Thompson has emphasized that crime and disorder were characteristic responses of the working and lower classes to the oppressions imposed upon them. He argues that crime was defined and punished primarily as an activity that threatened the status, property and interests of the elites. England's lower classes were kept under control by large-scale execution, transportation to the colonies, and imprisonment in horrible hulks of old warships. There was no interest in reforming the culprits, the goal being to deter through extremely harsh punishment.

=== Late-1960s: Time, Work-Discipline, and Industrial Capitalism ===
Time discipline, as it pertains to sociology and anthropology, is the general name given to social and economic rules, conventions, customs, and expectations governing the measurement of time, the social currency and awareness of time measurements, and people's expectations concerning the observance of these customs by others.

Thompson authored Time, Work-Discipline, and Industrial Capitalism, published in 1967, which posits that reliance on clock-time is a result of the European Industrial Revolution and that neither industrial capitalism nor the creation of the modern state would have been possible without the imposition of synchronic forms of time and work discipline. An accurate and precise record of time was not kept prior to the industrial revolution. The new clock-time imposed by government and capitalist interests replaced earlier, collective perceptions of time—such as natural rhythms of time like sunrise, sunset, and seasonal changes—that Thompson believed flowed from the collective wisdom of human societies. However, although it is likely that earlier views of time were imposed by religious and other social authorities prior to the industrial revolution, Thompson's work identified time discipline as an important concept for study within the social sciences.

Thompson addresses the development of time as a measurement that has value and that can be controlled by social structures. As labor became more mechanized during the industrial revolution, time became more precise and standardized. Factory work changed the relationship that the capitalist and laborers had with time and the clock; clock time became a tool for social control. Capitalist interests demanded that the work of laborers be monitored accurately to ensure that cost of labor was to the maximum benefit of the capitalist.

== Post-academia ==
Thompson left the University of Warwick in protest at its commercialisation, as documented in the book Warwick University Limited (1971). He continued to teach and lecture as a visiting professor, particularly in the United States. However, he increasingly worked as a freelance writer, contributing many essays to New Society, Socialist Register and historical journals. In 1978, he published The Poverty of Theory which attacked the structural Marxism of Louis Althusser and his followers in Britain on New Left Review (saying: "...all of them are Geschichtenscheissenschlopff, unhistorical shit"). The title echoes that of Karl Marx's 1847 polemic against Pierre-Joseph Proudhon, The Poverty of Philosophy; and that of philosopher Karl Popper's 1936 book The Poverty of Historicism. Thompson's polemic provoked a book-length response from Perry Anderson entitled Arguments Within English Marxism.

During the late 1970s, Thompson acquired a large public audience as a critic of what he perceived as the then Labour government's disregard of civil liberties; his writings from this time are collected in Writing By Candlelight (1980). From 1981 onward, Thompson was a frequent contributor to the American magazine The Nation.

From 1980, Thompson was the most prominent intellectual of the revived movement for nuclear disarmament, revered by activists throughout the world. In Britain, his pamphlet Protest and Survive, a parody on the government leaflet Protect and Survive, played a major role in the revived strength of the Campaign for Nuclear Disarmament. Just as important, Thompson was, with Ken Coates, Mary Kaldor, Dan Smith and others, an author of the 1980 Appeal for European Nuclear Disarmament, calling for a nuclear-free Europe from Poland to Portugal, which was the founding document of European Nuclear Disarmament. END was both a Europe-wide campaign that comprised a series of large public conferences (the END Conventions), and a small British pressure group.

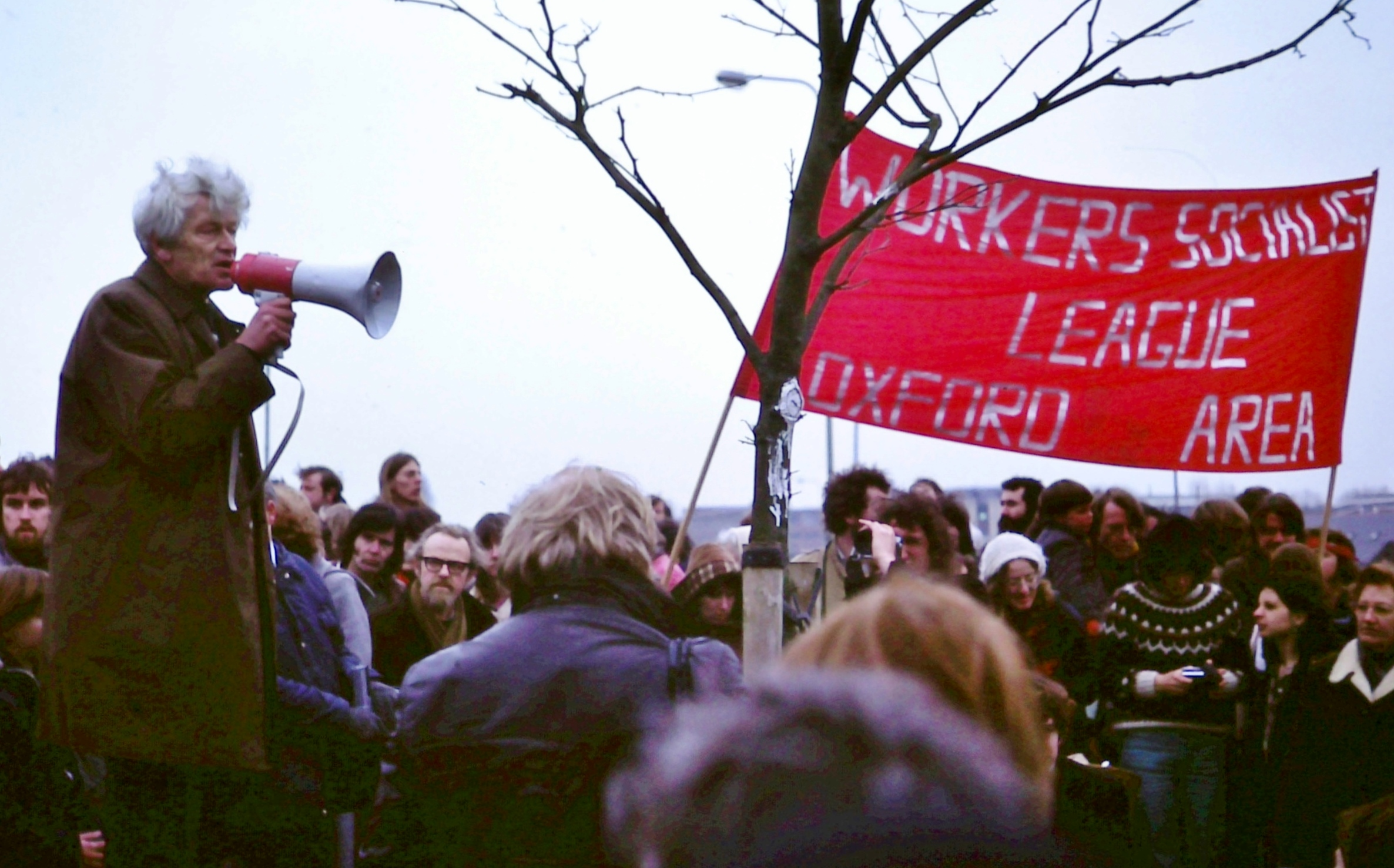
E P Thompson speaking to anti-nuclear weapons protesters in 1980

Thompson played a key role in both END and CND throughout the 1980s, speaking at many public meetings, corresponding with hundreds of fellow activists and sympathetic intellectuals, and doing committee work. He had a particularly important part in opening a dialogue between the west European peace movement and dissidents in Soviet-dominated eastern Europe, particularly in Hungary and Czechoslovakia, for which he was denounced as a tool of American imperialism by the Soviet authorities.

He wrote dozens of polemical articles and essays during this period, which are collected in the books Zero Option (1982) and The Heavy Dancers (1985). He also wrote an extended essay attacking the ideologists on both sides of the cold war, Double Exposure (1985) and edited a collection of essays opposing Ronald Reagan's Strategic Defense Initiative, Star Wars (1985).

An excerpt from a speech given by Thompson featured in the computer game Deus Ex Machina (1984). Thompson's own recitation of his 1950 poem of "apocalyptic expectation, "The Place Called Choice," appeared on the 1984 vinyl recording "The Apocalypso", by Canadian pop group Singing Fools, released by A&M Records. During the 1980s Thompson was also invited by Michael Eavis, who founded a local branch of CND, to speak at the Glastonbury Festival on several occasions after it became a fundraising event for the organisation: Thompson's speech at the 1983 edition of the festival, where he declared that the audience were part of an "alternative nation" of " inventors, writers... theatre, musicians" opposed to Margaret Thatcher and the tradition of "moneymakers and imperialists" which he identified her with, was named by Eavis as the best speech ever made at the festival.

=== 1990s: William Blake ===
The last book Thompson finished was Witness Against the Beast: William Blake and the Moral Law (1993). The product of years of research and published shortly after his death, it shows how far Blake was inspired by dissident religious ideas rooted in the thinking of the most radical opponents of the monarchy during the English civil war.

== Legacy and criticism ==
Thompson was one of the principal intellectuals of the Communist Party of Great Britain. Although he left the party in 1956 due to its suppression of open debate over the Soviet invasion of Hungary, he continued to refer to himself as a "historian in the Marxist tradition", calling for a rebellion against Stalinism as a prerequisite for the restoration of communists' "confidence in our own revolutionary perspectives".

Thompson played a key role in the first New Left in Britain in the late 1950s. He was a vociferous left-wing socialist critic of the Labour governments of 1964–70 and 1974–79, and an early and constant supporter of the Campaign for Nuclear Disarmament, becoming during the 1980s the leading intellectual light of the movement against nuclear weapons in Europe.

Although Thompson left the Communist Party of Great Britain, he remained committed to Marxist ideals. Leszek Kołakowski wrote a very harsh criticism of Thompson in his 1974 essay "My Correct Views on Everything", accusing Thompson of intellectual dishonesty in minimizing the brutalities of communism and placing abstract principles over real-world consequences. Tony Judt considered this rejoinder so authoritative that he claimed that "no one who reads it will ever take E.P. Thompson seriously again". Kołakowski's portrait of Thompson elicited some protests from readers and other left-wing journals came to Thompson's defence. On the 50th anniversary of the landmark publication of The Making of the English Working Class, several journalists celebrated E.P. Thompson as one of the pre-eminent historians of his day.

As Marxist history became less fashionable in the face of the adaptation of discourse-focused approaches inspired by the linguistic turn and post-structuralism in the 1980s, Thompson's work was subjected to critique by fellow historians. Joan Wallach Scott argued that Thompson's approach in The Making of the English Working Class was androcentric, and ignored the centrality of gender in the construction of class identities, with the sphere of paid labour in which economic class was rooted being understood as inherently male and privileged over the feminised domestic realm. Sheila Rowbotham, also a feminist historian and a friend of E.P. and Dorothy Thompson, has argued that Scott's critique was ahistorical, given that the book was published in 1963, before the second-wave feminist movement had fully developed a theoretical gender perspective. In a 2020 interview, Rowbotham acknowledged that "there was not a great deal of reference to women in The Making... But at the time it seemed like there were a lot of references to women, because we had to read people like J. H. Plumb — history in which there were really absolutely no women at all", and suggested that Thompson limited his writing about women in deference to his wife, for whom women's history was a key area of research interest. Rowbotham did acknowledge that whilst they supported the emancipation of women, the Thompsons had mixed feelings about the contemporary second-wave feminist movement, regarding it as too middle class. Barbara Winslow, who studied under Thompson and named him as "the most important academic influence on my life", similarly acknowledged that whilst "he was not politically sympathetic to the women's liberation movement, in part because he thought it was an American import, he was not hostile to women students or their feminist research agendas", and argued that early women's history in the 1960s primarily focused on "writing women into history", with more sophisticated feminist theoretical approaches only arriving later.

Gareth Stedman Jones claimed that the conception of the role of experience in The Making of the English Working Class embodied the idea of a direct link between social being and social consciousness, ignoring the importance of discourse as a means of mediating between the two, enabling people to develop a political understanding of the world and orientating them to political action. Marc Steinberg argued that Stedman Jones' interpretation of Thompson's perspective was "reductionist", with Thompson understanding the relationship between experience and consciousness as a "complex dialectical relationship".

Wade Matthews argued in 2013:

Numerous books, special collections, and journal articles on E.P. Thompson's scholarly work and legacy appeared soon after his death in 1993. Since then, however, interest in Thompson has waned. The reasons for this are perhaps easily enough summarized. Today, Thompson's histories are viewed as old-fashioned, while his socialist politics are believed extinct. Class is considered neither a fruitful concept of historical analysis nor an appropriate basis for an emancipatory politics. Nuclear weapons proliferate, but no anti-nuclear movement grows up alongside their proliferation. Civil liberties are a minority, and increasingly "radical," interest in the age of the "war on terror." Internationalism, as ideology and practice, is the preserve of capital not labour. At the beginning of the twenty-first century, then, Thompson seems out of place. ...certainly part of his distinctiveness lay in his literary style and tone. But it also lay in the moral quality which undergirded his histories and his political interventions. Part of that quality was the "glimpses of other possibilities of human nature, other ways of behaving" that they gave us. In this way, as Stefan Collini has suggested, Thompson is perhaps more relevant than he ever was.

== Personal life ==
In 1948 Thompson married Dorothy Towers, whom he met at Cambridge. A fellow left-wing historian, she wrote studies on women in the Chartist movement, and the biography Queen Victoria: Gender and Power. She was Professor of History at the University of Birmingham. The Thompsons had three children, the youngest of whom is Kate Thompson.

After four years of declining health, Thompson died at his home in Upper Wick, Worcestershire, on 28 August 1993, aged 69.

== Honours ==
A blue plaque to the Thompsons was erected by the Halifax Civic Trust in 2013.

== Selected works ==
- William Morris: Romantic to Revolutionary. London: Lawrence & Wishart, 1955.
- "Socialist Humanism," The New Reasoner, vol. 1, no. 1 (Summer 1957), pp. 105–143.
- "The New Left," The New Reasoner, whole no. 9 (Summer 1959), pp. 1–17.
- The Making of the English Working Class London: Victor Gollancz (1963); 2nd edition with new postscript, Harmondsworth: Penguin, 1968, third edition with new preface 1980.
- "Time, work-discipline and industrial capitalism." Past & Present, vol 38, no. 1 (1967), pp. 56–97.
- "The moral economy of the English crowd in the eighteenth century." Past & Present, vol. 50, no. 1 (1971), pp. 76–136.
- Whigs and Hunters: The Origin of the Black Act, London: Allen Lane, 1975.
- Albion's Fatal Tree: Crime and Society in Eighteenth Century England. (Editor.) London: Allen Lane, 1975.
- The Poverty of Theory and Other Essays, London: Merlin Press, 1978.
- Writing by Candlelight, London: Merlin Press, 1980.
- Zero Option, London: Merlin Press, 1982.
- Double Exposure, London: Merlin Press, 1985.
- The Heavy Dancers, London: Merlin Press, 1985.
- The Sykaos Papers, London: Bloomsbury, 1988.
- Customs in Common: Studies in Traditional Popular Culture, London: Merlin Press, 1991.
- Witness Against the Beast: William Blake and the Moral Law, Cambridge: Cambridge University Press, 1993.
- Alien Homage: Edward Thompson and Rabindranath Tagore, Delhi: Oxford University Press, 1993.
- Making History: Writings on History and Culture, New York: New Press, 1994.
- Beyond the Frontier: The Politics of a Failed Mission, Bulgaria 1944, Rendlesham: Merlin, 1997.
- The Romantics: England in a Revolutionary Age, Woodbridge: Merlin Press, 1997.
- Collected Poems, Newcastle upon Tyne: Bloodaxe, 1999.

== See also ==
- Cultural studies
- Postpositivism
