= Barbara Winslow =

American historian

Barbara Winslow is an American historian and a feminist activist. Born and raised in New York City, Winslow attended Antioch College, where she majored in Women Studies. She spent her junior year abroad at the University of Leeds, and subsequently returned to the UK in 1969 to attend the University of Warwick, where she studied under E. P. Thompson, who she has described as "the most important academic influence on my life". She obtained her Ph.D. in women's history from the University of Washington. She is currently an associate professor in the School of Education at Brooklyn College and CUNY, as well as a member of the Organization of American Historians.

== Bibliography ==
Some of her books are:

- Shirley Chisholm: Catalyst for Change
- Dance on a Sealskin
- Kittery Ghost
- Sylvia Pankhurst: Sexual Politics and Political Activism
- Fancy and Francis
- Samantha Goes to Georgetown on the C & O Canal
