= Edward John Thompson =

British scholar, novelist, historian and translator

Edward John Thompson (9 April 1886 – 28 April 1946) was a British scholar, novelist, historian and translator. He is remembered for his translations from Bengali into English and his association with Rabindranath Tagore, on whom he wrote two books including a critical biography.

== Early life ==
Edward Thompson was born on 9 April 1886 in Hazel Grove in Stockport, England. He was the eldest of six children of the Wesleyan missionary couple John Moses Thompson and Elizabeth Thompson who had served in South India. His father died before he was 10 and his mother brought up the children under financially strained circumstances. Thompson was educated at the Kingswood School and later worked at a bank in Bethnal Green to support his mother and siblings. He joined Richmond Theological College, was ordained a Methodist minister and gained a degree from the University of London. In 1907 he published his first collection of verse, The Knight Mystic.

== In India ==
Thompson was sent to India in 1910 to teach English literature at the Wesleyan College in Bankura, Bengal and he went on to serve there as Vice Principal of the college and Principal of the mission's school located on campus. During the First World War he served with the 2nd Battalion, Leicestershire Regiment as an army chaplain in Mesopotamia from 1916 to 1918, and his services to the wounded earned him a Military Cross. His experiences during the war found expression in his memoir, The Leicestershires beyond Baghdad and The Mesopotamian Verses, both of which were published in 1919. The latter work earned him repute as a poet.

In Bengal, Thompson began learning the language and came to know Rabindranath Tagore. Thompson was with Tagore at Santiniketan when news of his being awarded the Nobel Prize for Literature broke. Thompson translated many of Tagore's writings, including Megh o Raudra, and wrote two books: Rabindranath Tagore: His Life & Work in 1921 and Rabindranath Tagore, Poet and Dramatist in 1926, a critical biography of Tagore that led to bitter recrimination with him. Although Thompson argued that Tagore was underappreciated and misunderstood in the West, some of his criticisms of Tagore in the latter work led to much tension and misunderstanding between them.

Thompson was a keen observer of Indian politics and was sympathetic to the aspirations of the Indian nationalists. In his own words, he was "a liberal conservative with a touch of socialism" and he often took views opposed to the official British line in India. He was an advocate of dominion status for India and called for greater educational facilities for Indians to counter the Indian opposition to colonial rule, agreeing with Percy Comyn Lyon, the education secretary of Bengal and a personal friend. In the wake of the Jallianwala Bagh massacre, he signed a letter of protest with 25 other missionaries condemning the atrocity.

Thompson also cultivated friendships with leaders from across the Indian political leadership, including Gandhi, Nehru and Iqbal. He was especially close to Nehru and the two remained in contact till Thompson's death. He was a proponent of Indian unity, opposed to the two nation theory and the idea of Pakistan. His close friendships and the fact that he himself remained apolitical made him what Natwar Singh terms "a well meaning but not very successful Anglo-India goodwill ambassador [who] was listened to but did not have enough clout to influence policy in London or in New Delhi". In 1939, he visited India, funded by the Rhodes Foundation, to gauge the reaction of the Indian National Congress to the Viceroy's unilateral decision to declare India a party to the Second World War and went with Nehru to the Congress Working Committee meeting in Wardha in 1939.

== In England ==
Thompson returned to Oxford in 1923, where he joined the Indian Institute, teaching Bengali to ICS probationers. It was in England that he published Rabindranath Tagore: Poet and Dramatist that so displeased Tagore, but earned him a PhD from the University of London. He continued translating from Bengali to English and was involved with the India Society. He was a Leverhulme Research Fellow from 1934 to 1936 and a Research Fellow in Indian history at Oriel College from 1936 to 1940. He made three trips to India in the 1930s funded by the Rhodes Foundation to look at 'intellectual co-operation' between writers, to research his biography of Lord Metcalfe and for the purpose of gauging the Congress's reaction to the Viceroy's unilateral declaration of war. Thompson was an advocate of Oxford–India ties and argued, unsuccessfully, for grants to Indian writers from the Rhodes Foundation and for inviting Nehru as Rhodes Visiting Lecturer to Oxford in 1940. He was also a freelance journalist and twice visited India as a correspondent for The Guardian, where he covered the Round Table Conferences of 1930 to 1932.

== Books ==
Thompson was a prolific author who wrote several works of verse and prose, fiction and non-fiction. His early vocation was to be a poet and his first collection of verse, The Knight Mystic, came out in 1907. His other works of poetry include The Mesopotamian Verses (1919), Collected Poems (1930), New Recessional (1942) and 100 Poems (1944). His verse remained stylistically traditional but matured in its intensity and precision over the years.

Thompson also wrote several novels, including Introducing the Arnisons (1935), John Arnison (1939) and five novels on India. The first of these was An Indian Day (1927) which was touted as "a counterblast" to E. M. Forster's A Passage to India published three years earlier. His other Indian novels are Night falls on Siva's hill (1929), A Farewell to India (1931), So a Poor Ghost (1933) and An End of the Hours (1938). Both A Farewell to India and An End of the Hours are featuring some of the characters of An Indian Day. Another novel Burmese Silver (1938) is set in Burma. A Letter from India (1932) is a political treatise. The scholar Harish Trivedi has noted that "[Thompson] deserves to be revived as the fourth of the top quartet of Raj novelists, next in interest only to Kipling, Forster and Paul Scott".

These Men, Thy Friends (1927) is a fictionalized novel of events in Mesopotamia in 1916-1918, which is presumably based on his own experiences.

The Other Side of the Medal (1925), which examines the Revolt of 1857 from an Indian perspective, The Reconstruction of India (1930), The Rise and Fulfilment of British Rule in India (1934), Ethical Ideals in India Today (1942) and The Making of the Indian Princes (1943) are among the books that he wrote on India's history and culture. The Making of the Indian Princes was read by Nehru in the Ahmednagar jail and reviewed favourably by E. M. Forster.

Suttee (1928), on the outlawed practice of Sati, The Life of Charles, Lord Metcalfe (1937), his biography of the English administrator Charles Metcalfe and the plays Atonement: A play of modern India (1924) and Elizabeth and Essex (1943) are his other notable works.

== Family ==
In 1919, Thompson married Theodosia, daughter of the American missionary William Jessup in Jerusalem, having met her while posted there the previous year. The couple had two sons, Frank, the elder, who died in Bulgaria during the Second World War, and the second, Edward Palmer Thompson, the noted historian.

== Death ==
Thompson died in Bledlow, Buckinghamshire of stomach cancer on 28 April 1946. He was 60. He is buried at the Bledlow church. India's Prisoner is a biography of his life by Mary Lago.
