= Supreme Court of New South Wales for the District of Port Phillip =

Former judicial body

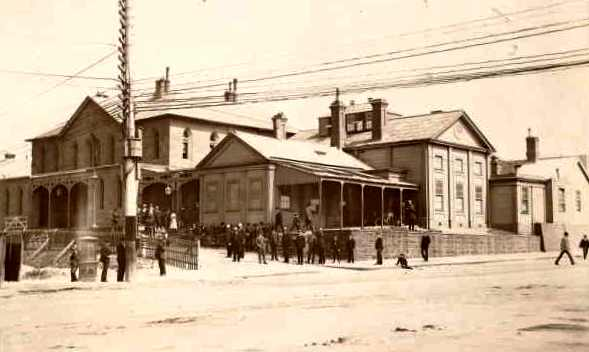
The old Supreme Court building, on the north-west corner of Latrobe and Russell Streets, Melbourne. Constructed in 1842, it housed the Supreme Court of New South Wales for the District of Port Phillip until 1852.

The Supreme Court of New South Wales for the District of Port Phillip was an historical division of the Supreme Court of New South Wales, exercising the jurisdiction of that court within the Port Phillip District of New South Wales. It consisted of a single Resident Judge. It existed from 1840 until 1852, when, following the separation of the Port Phillip District to form the Colony of Victoria, it was replaced by the Supreme Court of Victoria.

== Jurisdiction ==
The initial jurisdiction of the Port Phillip division was set out under the Administration of Justice Act 1840 (NSW). For the most part, its jurisdiction was the same as the Supreme Court of New South Wales' ordinary jurisdiction, with the Resident Judge able to exercise all the powers and jurisdiction of the court, including powers and jurisdiction exercisable by a full bench.

In addition to creating the position of Resident Judge, the legislation removed from the court in Sydney the jurisdiction at first instance over the Port Phillip District. However, decisions made by the Resident Judge could be appealed to the other three judges in Sydney. Moreover, the Advancement of Justice Act 1841 (NSW) provided that the Resident Judge could reserve questions of law for consideration by the full bench.

== History ==
The first local arrangements for the administration of justice within the Port Phillip District were implemented on 1 June 1836, when at a public meeting, the residents of Melbourne appointed James Simpson as an arbitrator to resolve disputes between them. Following the official opening up of settlement in the district, Captain William Lonsdale was appointed as police magistrate, and held the first local court sittings within the District. A Court of Quarter Sessions (for criminal trials) was established on 14 August 1838, and a Court of Requests (for civil matters) in late 1839, but major cases had to be heard in the Supreme Court in Sydney.

This situation produced many difficulties, not least the exorbitant cost to the New South Wales administration of transporting defendants and witnesses to Sydney; expenses for witnesses alone reached over £150 in one case. Public disquiet in Melbourne over the standards of the administration of justice also contributed to the pressure for a local court.

Responding to these pressures, the administration moved to provide for a local court. The Port Phillip division was established by way of the Administration of Justice Act 1840 (NSW), which created the position of Resident Judge for Port Phillip (and a similar position for New Zealand, which was a part of New South Wales until 1841).

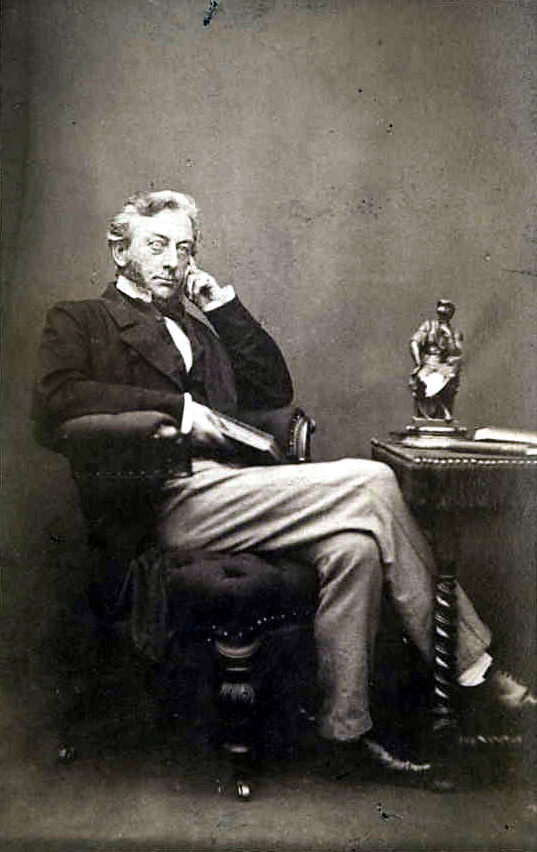
John Walpole Willis, here pictured c. 1863-1877, was Resident Judge from 1841 until 1843.

Justice John Walpole Willis was appointed the first Resident Judge by Governor George Gipps, largely to provide some measure of peace within the judicial establishment, Willis having been engaged in a number of acrimonious conflicts with his fellow judges in Sydney. Sittings of the Court began on 12 April 1841. Willis was soon in conflict with the legal profession and various leading citizens in Melbourne, and a series of petitions were produced calling for him to be recalled to Sydney. Willis was notified on 24 June 1843 that he had been amoved by Governor Gipps, however the Privy Council subsequently held that while there were sufficient grounds for his removal, he should have been given an opportunity to be heard. His appointment was revoked by the Queen in August 1846.

Willis was succeeded by Justice William Jeffcott, who was an effective and well-regarded judge. However, in December 1844, after Willis appealed the order removing him from office to the Privy Council, Jeffcott resigned, out of conscientious concern that were Willis' appeal upheld his own appointment would be invalid. Replacing Jeffcott was Justice Roger Therry, previously a member of the Legislative Council of New South Wales, who served as Resident Judge until February 1846, when he was transferred to the bench in Sydney. Justice William à Beckett, then the Primary Judge in Equity in Sydney, became Resident Judge following Therry's departure in 1846.

The Port Phillip District was separated from New South Wales on 1 July 1851, to form the new Colony of Victoria. The Australian Constitutions Act 1850 (13 & 14 Vict. c. 59 (Imp)) provided an initial constitution for Victoria, but it did not create any courts, rather, it provided that the current arrangements would continue either until a charter of justice were issued, or until legislation were implemented by the Legislative Council of Victoria. The Administration of Justice Act 1852 was accordingly passed by the Legislative Council in January 1852, creating the Supreme Court of Victoria to replace the Supreme Court for Port Phillip.

== Judges ==
| Name | Appointment commenced | Appointment ended | Term in office | Comments | Notes |
|---|---|---|---|---|---|
| John Willis | 8 February 1841 | 24 June 1843 | 2 years, 136 days | His effective removal was 1843 however his appointment was not formally revoked until August 1846. | |
| William Jeffcott | 1 July 1843 | December 1844 | 1 year, 153 days | | |
| Roger Therry | 9 January 1845 | 17 February 1846 | 1 year, 39 days | | |
| William à Beckett | 28 February 1846 | 23 January 1852 | 5 years, 329 days | Became first Chief Justice of Victoria 24 Jan 1852. | |
