= T. M. Wilkes =

New Zealand civil aviation pioneer

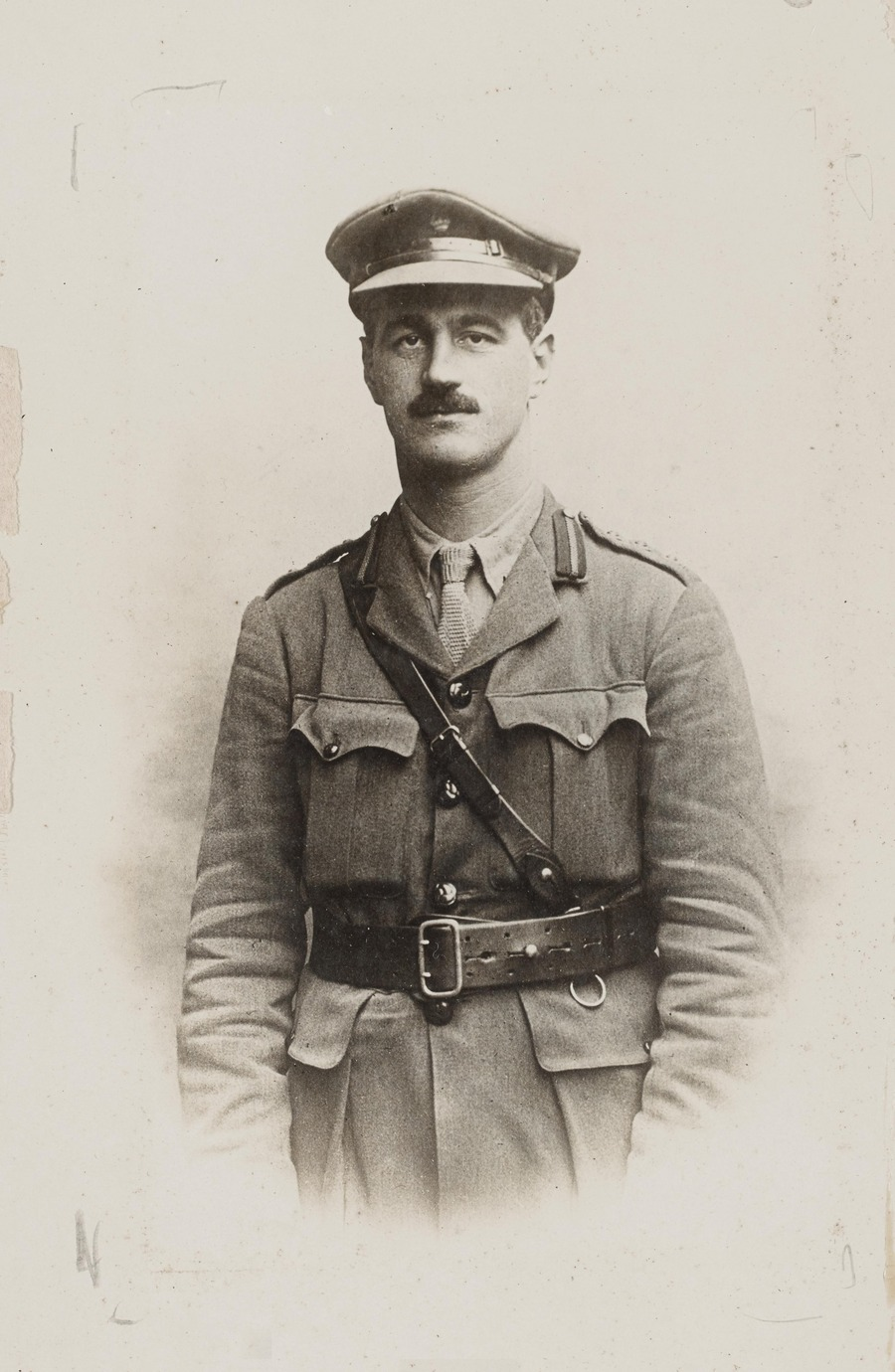
Captain T. M. Wilkes photograph (1920)

Thomas Martin Wilkes CBE, MC (24 March 1888 - 23 October 1958) was a New Zealand soldier who later, as an Air Force Group Captain, was appointed to the Royal New Zealand Air Force's Air Board. Wilkes also served as Controller of Civil Aviation in New Zealand as part of a twenty-year career during which he developed and regulated civil aviation policy.

== Early life and education ==
Thomas Martin Wilkes was son of Walter Wilkes (died 1920), of Chronometer House, Thames, Coromandel, New Zealand, who owned a "lucrative" watchmaking and jewellery business, and was a "highly-respected" "good man" in the community, and Elizabeth (d. 1940), née Green, The Wilkes family had come from England in the mid-1800s; it was observed in 1901 that Walter Wilkes's business was "handed down... from generation to generation of this worthy family, who all seem to be jewellers." On the death from consumption of family friend and neighbour Frederick James Ray, a dispensing chemist who had lived with the Wilkes family for some time due to his declining health, Walter Wilkes- the executor of his will- took over the business to generate income for Ray's estate's beneficiaries, who were in the United Kingdom. T. M. Wilkes was educated at King's College, Auckland, then Auckland University College (now the University of Auckland).

== Career ==
After university, Wilkes entered the New Zealand Staff Corps. He then served in World War I, initially as a Lieutenant with the Advance Party of the 2nd New Zealand Rifle Brigade in 1915, with whom he fought in Egypt as part of the Egyptian Expeditionary Force until 1916. He then participated in the Western European campaign until 1919, as well as the Army of Occupation of Germany, serving as a brigade major and DAQMG (Deputy Assistant Quartermaster General) to a division serving in France. During his service he was awarded the Military Cross (December 1917, London Gazette 1 January 1918) and was twice mentioned in despatches. He received additionally the 1914-15 Star, British War Medal, and Victory Medal with oak leaf. During his army career Wilkes had been seconded to the Royal Flying Corps, and when he was discharged from the Army in November 1919, he returned to his former occupation as an officer of the New Zealand Staff Corps, being the only officer qualified as a pilot. He was also appointed to the Royal New Zealand Air Force's Air Board as Secretary, where later, as Controller of Civil Aviation, he would serve alongside Sir Leonard Monk Isitt (with whom, when both were Captains, Wilkes had flown over Mount Cook), H. W. L. Saunders, Fred Jones, and Arthur de Terrotte Nevill. From 1925 to 1931, Wilkes held the position of Director of Air Services with the New Zealand Permanent Air Force, having transferred from the NZSC. In 1929, he was posted to London as liaison officer with the Air Ministry, keeping the New Zealand Government informed of developments in the RAF and also negotiating the purchasing of aircraft. Early in 1931, as part of the Government's economic campaign, Wilkes was recalled and the liaison office was closed. In 1931, he was reappointed to the position of DAS (retaining this until the 1937 reorganisation of the RNZAF), and in 1933 was additionally named Controller of Civil Aviation. In 1936, when the New Zealand Government decided to establish an autonomous Air Force free from Army control; Wilkes, as Director of Air Services, was responsible for preparing a scheme and ascertaining costs. With the input of a British Air Force adviser, Wing Commander (later Air Chief Marshal) the Hon. Sir Ralph Cochrane, AFC, RAF, who later took the position of Chief of the Air Staff, the objective was reached. During this time Wilkes also served as New Zealand Liaison Officer to RAAF Melbourne from 1940-1946, and to the Netherland Forces in the East from 1944-1946, at which time he retired.

Wilkes was awarded the King George V Silver Jubilee Medal in 1935, and was appointed Commander of the Order of the British Empire in the 1937 Coronation Honours.

== Personal life ==
In 1935, Wilkes had married Gladys, daughter of solicitor R. H. Rattray, of Invercargill, president of the Southland District Law Society, whose practice was later passed on to Fred Hall-Jones, OBE. He died at Lower Hutt, Wellington, New Zealand on 23 October 1958. The Minister of Defence, Philip Connolly, stated: “In the face of much scepticism and opposition, he worked tirelessly for something he earnestly believed in. The subsequent achievements of the RNZAF and the fine position we are in today with regard to civil aviation are themselves monuments to his early efforts.” His first cousin was Leslie R. H. Willis, engineer and archaeologist who excavated an Iron Age settlement at the hamlet of Dainton, at Ipplepen, Teignbridge, Devon.
