= Witness Against the Beast =

Historical non-fiction book

Witness Against the Beast: William Blake and the Moral Law
- Cover of the paperback edition, released in Fall 1994
- Author: E. P. Thompson
- Language: English
- Genre: Literary criticism
- Publisher: Cambridge University Press
- Publication date: 1993
- Publication place: United Kingdom
- Media type: Print (hardback & paperback)
- Pages: 284
- ISBN: 0-521-46977-5
- OCLC: 32368799

Witness Against the Beast: William Blake and the Moral Law is a 1993 book by the British historian E. P. Thompson in which Thompson contextualizes the work of the otherwise enigmatic poet and painter William Blake. The last book that Thompson would write, it was published posthumously. The book attempts to frame some of Blake's ideas in the traditions of the culture of religious dissent in England.

== See also ==
- The Making of the English Working Class
