= Rushwick =

Village in Worcestershire, England

Coordinates: 52.18°N 2.26°W

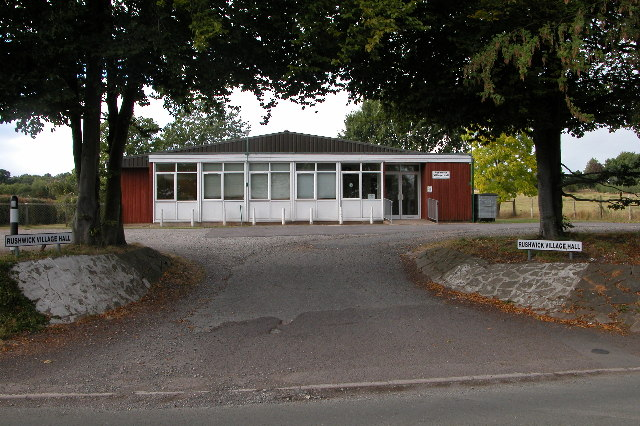
- Rushwick Village Hall

- Location within Worcestershire
- Population: 1,401 (2021)
- Civil parish: Rushwick
- District: Malvern Hills
- Shire county: Worcestershire
- Region: West Midlands
- Country: England
- Sovereign state: United Kingdom
- Post town: Worcester
- Postcode district: WR2
- Dialling code: 01905
- Police: West Mercia
- Fire: Hereford and Worcester
- Ambulance: West Midlands
- UK Parliament: West Worcestershire

Rushwick is a village and civil parish in the Malvern Hills district, in the county of Worcestershire, England. It is situated to the west of Worcester, Rushwick Parish comprises the four villages and hamlets of Broadmore Green, Crown East, Rushwick village and Upper Wick. The River Teme forms the southern boundary of the parish, and the Worcester to Hereford railway line passes through the village. The area of the parish is 5.0558 square kilometres (1.9521 sq mi).

In the 2021 census, the population of the parish was 1,401.

Rushwick village has been circumvented by the Western By-pass, reducing through traffic, making it much quieter compared with previous times. It has one pub inside the village, and one on the outskirts. An organic meat and vegetable shop can be found in the south of the village. There is also a preschool and a primary school.

The parish church, dedicated to St Thomas, was originally built as a private chapel in the 1840s, but was rebuilt on the main Bromyard road, in the village of Crown East, in 1876. It is a grade II listed building.

Rushwick Cricket Club, with its three Worcester Cricket League teams, Sunday and Evening League sides, and Junior teams from Under-9 to Under-16 age-groups, is situated in Upper Wick, at the Alf Tolley Memorial Ground.

The parish has a parish council, the lowest level of local government.

The parish was formed in 1894 as "St John Bedwardine County" from the rural part of "St John Bedwardine". On 16 July 1962 the parish was renamed to "Rushwick".
