= John William Willis-Bund =

British local historian and politician in Worcestershire (1843–1928)

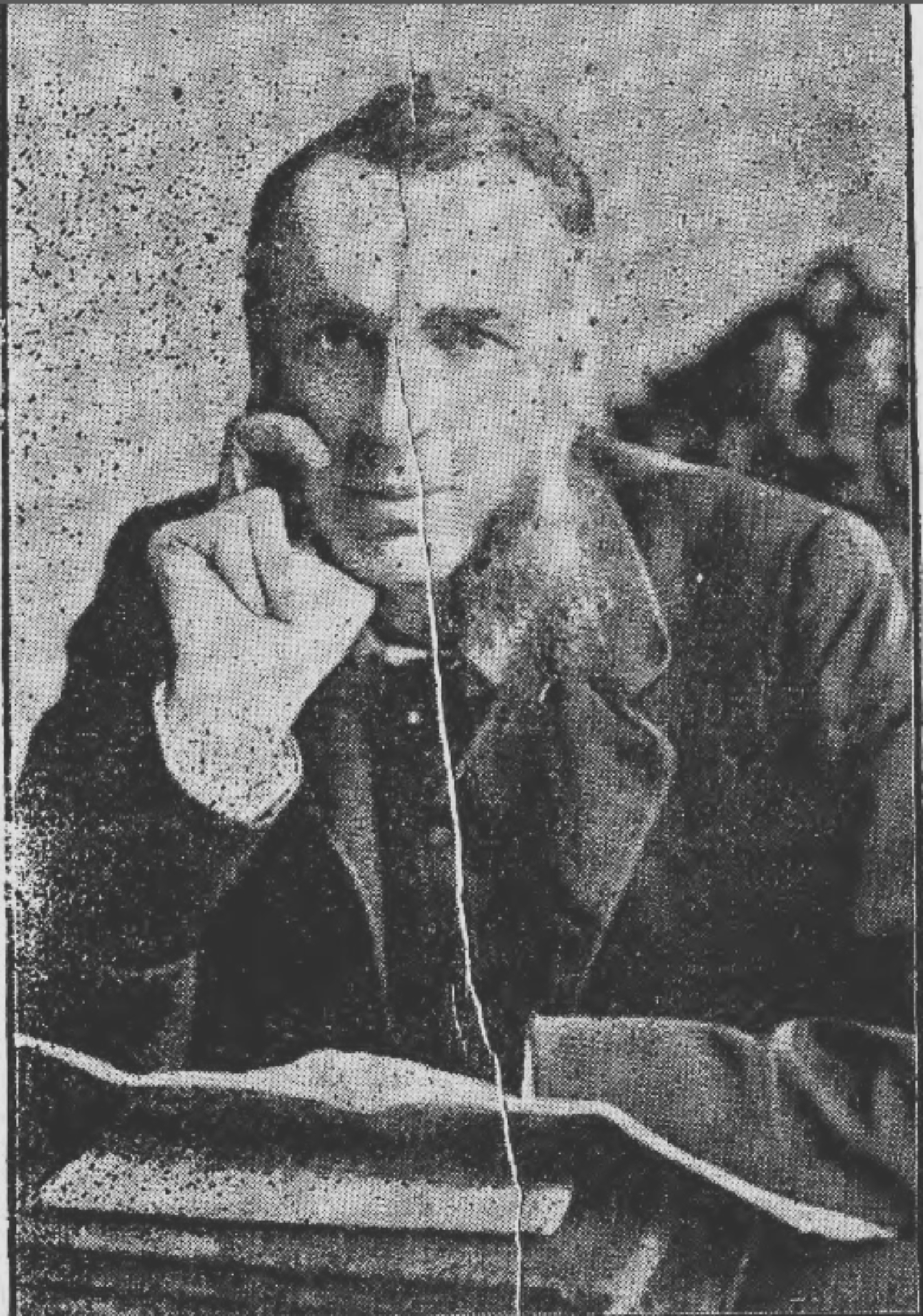
Willis-Bund in c.1897

John William Bund Willis-Bund CBE JP FSA (8 August 1843 – 7 June 1928) was a British lawyer, legal writer and professor of constitutional law and history at King's College London, a historian who wrote on the Welsh church and other subjects, and a local Worcestershire politician.

== Biography ==
Willis-Bund was born in 1843 at sea, his parents returning from his father's judicial posting in Australia. He was baptized at Bahia, South America. He was the son of John Walpole Willis and his second wife Ann Susanna Kent Bund, of Wick Episcopi, Worcestershire. The adoption of his mother's surname (in 1864) was necessary in order to succeed his maternal grandfather as heir to the Bund family's Worcestershire properties. He was educated at Eton and Caius College, Cambridge, graduating B.A. in 1865 with first-class honours in Law (and was awarded an honorary M.A. in 1868). He was also awarded an LL.B. (1865).

He was called to the Bar from Lincoln's Inn. In the course of his legal career he was appointed King's Counsel. Willis-Bund was Professor of Constitutional Law and History at King's College London from 1869 to 1882, and Lecturer in Law at the University of Bristol from 1877 to 1879.

Robert Thomas Jenkins noted that Willis-Bund wrote extensively about the history of the church in Wales but that some of his views were not generally held to be those of other academics writing in the field. Jenkins commented on his editing of the Black Book of St. Davids in 1902 for the Honourable Society of Cymmrodorion: '...the work was but indifferently done', and mentioned another of Willis-Bund's books, The Celtic Church of Wales, 1897, which propounded a theory of his own and was, Jenkins states, judged by Louis Gougaud to be "dubious and prejudiced," and by Sir J. E. Lloyd to be "very haphazard". Additionally, Gougaud observed that Willis-Bund's views (along with those of Rice Rees), were 'widely different' from 'those adopted by present-day historians on the relation of ancient Celtic Christianity to the See of Peter', and Lloyd further stated that the work was a 'book of original, but highly disputable, views.' The Church Quarterly Review, in summary at the end of its review of the volume, concluded: 'We have not refrained from pointing out what we think the weak points of Mr Willis Bund's book: but the book is far better than its weakest points'. The book was considered a 'detailed' 'study of the institutions of ancient Welsh Christianity'. Willis-Bund was referred to by the Welsh politician Clement Edwards in a 1914 House of Commons debate on the Established Church in Wales as 'a great authority... one of the greatest authorities on the history of the old Welsh Church'. Sir Arthur Griffith-Boscawen, however, in response, observed that Willis-Bund 'never got any support for the theory' in question, regarding the origins of tithing.

He served as chairman of the Worcestershire County Council, the Worcestershire Appeal Tribunal, and the Worcestershire National Relief Fund during the First World War. He was appointed a Commander of the Order of the British Empire in the 1918 New Year Honours. In 1927 he was awarded the honorary degree of Doctor of Law from the University of Birmingham. He was appointed Vice-Lieutenant of the County of Worcester in November 1924. He was a Fellow of the Society of Antiquaries. He held several official positions on the Severn Fishery Board, in 1874 being vice-chairman, county member, and representative member; amongst his many books were Salmon Fishing (1885) and A Handy Book of Fishery Management (1889)

On his death in 1928, it was stated in Country Life that "a finer old man, with a more dominating personality, than the late Mr. Willis Bund would be hard to find, even in this country". His obituary in The Times called him "the grand old man of Worcestershire", and observed that he "by his personality and ability, had become the dominating influence in Worcestershire". Although his stern personality was noted, the obituary concluded that "his ability was recognized by all, and there is none left in Worcestershire adequately to fill his place."

== Personal life ==
In 1872, Willis-Bund married Harriette Penelope Temple, the daughter (by his second wife) of Richard Temple, of The Nash, Kempsey, Worcestershire, JP, DL. Temple's eldest son, also named Richard, a colonial administrator in India including as Governor of Bombay from 1877 to 1880, was created a baronet in 1876.

The Willis-Bunds had six children. His surviving son and heir, Henry, died, unmarried, nine months after his father, having received the Military Cross whilst a captain in the R.A.M.C. Willis-Bund's daughter Margaret married John Henry Milward, of the Redditch needle-manufacturing family. Daughter Mary Susanna's son, Francis Leader MacCarthy-Willis-Bund (1905–1980), was Chaplain, Fellow and Dean of Balliol College, Oxford.

In 1896, Willis-Bund married secondly Mary Elizabeth Thackeray, the daughter of General Frederick Rennell Thackeray and Lady Elizabeth Margaret Carnegie (the daughter of the 7th Earl of Northesk). Mary was the widow of Colonel Alexander Essex Frederick Holcombe, and second cousin of the novelist William Makepeace Thackeray. Willis-Bund's uncle was the clergyman and theologian William Downes Willis.

== Books and articles ==
- Some passages in the early history of Evesham Abbey, a paper read before the Worcester Diocesan Architectural and Archaeological Society, at the Guildhall, on 25 January 1895
- The Celtic Church of Wales, 1897
- Paper on Peckham in Transactions of the Honourable Society of Cymmrodorion, 1900-1
- 'Documents of the parish of Feckenham, Worcestershire'. Proceedings of the Society of Antiquaries of London, 2nd ser., 18 (1901).
- Extent of all the lands and rents of the lord bishop of St. David's, 1326, usually called the Black Book of St. David's (Cymmrodorion record series, 5). 1902
- The law of compensation for unexhausted agricultural improvements ... 1876 (3rd edition 1904).
- The Civil War in Worcestershire, 1642–1646, and the Scotch invasion of 1651 (Birmingham). 1905
- 'Worcestershire roads'. Reports & Papers Read at the Meetings of the Architectural (& Archaeological) Societies, 33 (1916), 376–95.

=== Works edited ===
- A Selection of Cases from the State Trials ... Trials for treason (1327–1681). Cambridge, 1879–1882.
  - Vol. 1. Trials for treason (1327–1660)
  - Vol. 2. pt. 1. Trials for treason (1660–1678)
  - Vol. 2. pt. 2. Trials for treason. The Popish plot (1678–1681)
- Lay Subsidy Roll for the County of Worcester, circ. 1280, with John Amphlett of Clent. (Worcestershire Historical Society). Oxford, 1893.
- The Inquisitiones Post Mortem for the County of Worcester. Pts. 1–2, 1242–1326 (Worcestershire Historical Society). Oxford, 1894–1909.
- Register of the Diocese of Worcester during the Vacancy of the See, usually called Registrum sede vacante, 1301-1435. 1 vol. in 2 pts. (Worcestershire Historical Society). 1897.
- Episcopal Registers, Diocese of Worcester. Register of Bishop Godfrey Giffard, September 23, 1268, to August 15, 1301. 2 vols. (Worcestershire Historical Society). 1898–1902.
- Worcestershire County Records. Calendar of the Quarter Session papers (1591–1643) (Worcestershire Historical Society). Worcester, 1900.
- Register of William de Geynesburgh, Bishop of Worcester, 1302–7. Intr. by R. A. Wilson (Worcestershire Historical Society). 1907–29.
- Diary of Henry Townshend of Elmley Lovett, 1640-1663. 2 vols. (Worcestershire Historical Society). 1915–20
- Religio medici: Hydriotaphia: and the Letter to a Friend, by Sir Thomas Browne (1605–1682). 1882
- Victoria County History: A History of the County of Worcester (Volume 1 edited by Willis-Bund alone; volumes 2–4 co-edited with William Page). 1901–1926
- Reflections: or sentences and moral maxims, by François, duc de La Rochefoucauld (1613–1680). 1871
