= Francis MacCarthy Willis Bund =

The Reverend Francis MacCarthy Willis Bund
- Born: Francis Leader MacCarthy; 10 May 1905; Goldington, England
- Died: June 14, 1980 (aged 75); Combe, Oxfordshire
- Education: Emmanuel College, Cambridge
- Known for: Dean and Fellow of Balliol College, Oxford
- Spouses: Joan Mildred Elton Carey (died 1948); Jane Dalkin
- Religion: Christianity (Anglican)
- Church: Church of England

Francis Leader MacCarthy Willis Bund (10 May 1905 – 14 June 1980) was an Anglican cleric and Chaplain, Dean and Fellow of Balliol College, Oxford.

== Life ==
He was born Francis Leader MacCarthy on 10 May 1905 at Goldington, Bedford. His father was John Leader MacCarthy, a descendant of the MacCarthy Reagh family, Princes of Carbery who was a local civil engineer, and his mother was Mary Susanna Willis Bund, the daughter of John William Willis Bund, a Worcestershire landowner and historian of the Celtic Church. He adopted the additional surnames of Willis Bund by Royal Licence in 1950 in compliance with a condition set out by his maternal grandfather to allow him to inherit family property in Worcestershire.

He was educated at Bedford Modern School and Emmanuel College, Cambridge (BA 1927, MA 1932), and became an assistant master at Shrewsbury School. He was appointed Chaplain and Fellow of Balliol in 1945, and after serving as a college proctor also became Dean. In this role he appears to have displayed a great deal of patience and tolerance amidst the growing rebelliousness of student life in the 1960s. Howard Marks, the notorious user and later smuggler of cannabis was an undergraduate at Balliol, and was frequently summoned to see the dean. In his autobiography Marks recalls developing "an enormous liking and respect" for MacCarthy Willis Bund, who interceded on Marks's behalf over drug use with the College's Senior Proctor. Also amongst MacCarthy Willis Bund's charges were J. I. Packer, the Christian theologian, whose studies in philosophy of religion he supervised, and the writer Ved Mehta, who also recalls the dean's tolerant approach to his duties.

MacCarthy Willis Bund also became a Fellow of All Souls College, Oxford.

He married first, Joan Mildred Elton Carey (died 1948) and secondly, Roberta J. ("Jane") Dalkin (died 2016). His eldest daughter, Alison MacCarthy Willis Bund married the distinguished American academic L. Perry Curtis who became Emeritus Professor of History at Brown University.

Francis Leader MacCarthy Willis Bund died in 1980 and was buried at Combe, Oxfordshire. There is a plaque dedicated to him outside the Old Dean's Room on the library staircase at Balliol.
