= Yelland Stone Rows =

Prehistoric monument in Devon, England

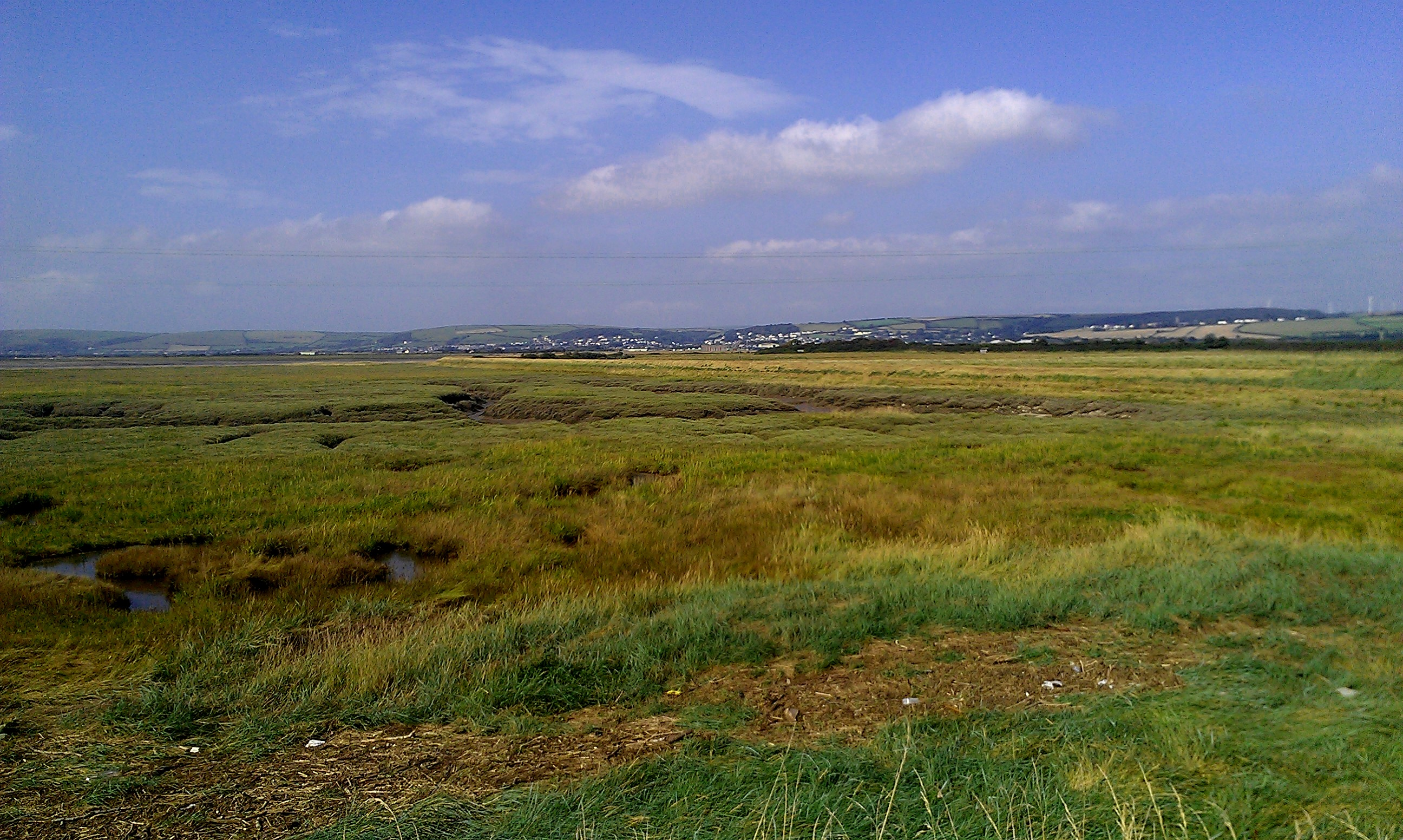
- Site of Yelland Stone Rows, River Taw estuary,

- Location within Devon
- 51.075438°N 4.155062°W
- Type: Stone Alignment
- Region: Devon

History
- Built: 2600 BC to 700 BC

Scheduled monument
- Official name: Yelland Stone Rows
- Designated: 1970
- Reference no.: 33321

The Yelland Stone Rows is a prehistoric monument of two parallel rows of small standing stones located on the tidal mudflats of the River Taw estuary, in Devon, England. Since the 1990s, the ancient stone alignment has disappeared from view into the silt and tidal debris. The site is within the nature reserve of Isley Marsh, and is owned by the Royal Society for the Protection of Birds (RSPB).

== Description ==
The Yelland Stone Rows is a prehistoric stone alignment of two parallel rows of small standing stones. The site is situated on the tidal mudflats of the estuary of the River Taw, and is currently within the nature reserve of Isley Marsh. The stone alignment consists of at least 18 sandstone pieces, at least 30 cm high and 22 cm wide, positioned in a pair of parallel rows, up to 2.5 m apart. Since the late 1990s, all the stones have been covered by silt. Due to its large population of migratory and overwintering birds, the preserve is owned by the Royal Society for the Protection of Birds (RSPB). Rare plants can also be found on the site, including rock sea-lavender.

== History ==
Stone alignments date from the Late Neolithic period (4500 BC - 3500 BC) to the Middle Bronze Age (1500 BC - 1000 BC). The Yelland Stone Rows were excavated by archaeologist, E. H. Rogers in the 1930s. A partial excavation uncovered eighteen stones arranged into nine standing pairs. Near the stones, Rogers discovered flint tools and evidence indicating human occupation of the site during the Mesolithic, Neolithic and Early Bronze Age eras. In 1932, the tallest standing stone measured 40cm in height above the silt, and the rows were determined to be 56m in length.

By 1983, only seven stones were visible above the mud and the remaining stones disappeared from view over the next several years. By the 1990s, the stones were no longer visible. According to Charlotte Russell, an English Heritage project officer, "The [Yelland] power-station closure resulting in less discharge into the sea and less lively current, allowing sediments to settle, is one suggested cause [of the disappearing stones]." ... other factors, like silting up of the estuary in the absence of shipping, changes to railway and flood-bank construction in the area, and changes in runoff from upstream may all have played a role."

In 2018, Historic England announced funding for a new archaeological investigation to locate the missing stones. A team of archeologists, led by Dr Martin Bates from the University of Wales Trinity Saint David, used geophysical surveying techniques to explore the thickly silted marsh to determine the location of the buried stones. The excavation was planned and timed for the team to work between tides and to cause the least disturbance to the bird populations in Isley Marsh.

== See also ==
- Drizzlecombe
- Grey Wethers
- Nine Maidens stone circle
