= Upper Wick =

Hamlet in Worcestershire, England

Coordinates: 52.177°N 2.257°W

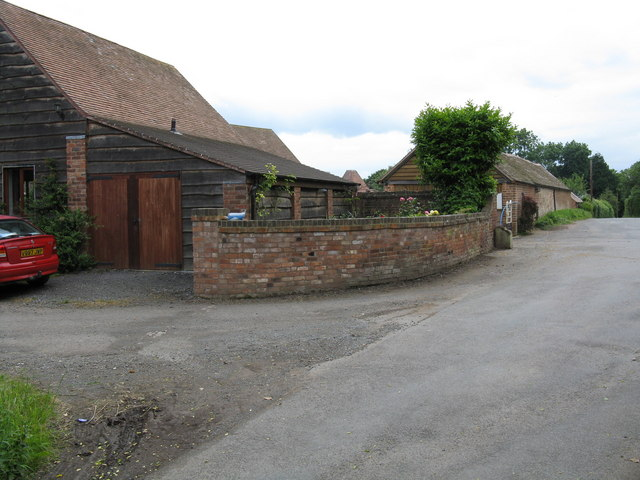
Farm at Upper Wick

Upper Wick is a hamlet in the parish of Rushwick, Worcestershire.

Ralph Ardern inherited the manor of Upper Wick between 1382 (the death of his father, Henry de Ardern) and 1408 (the death of his mother). The farm, as pictured, is owned by the Edmonds family.
