= Inter se =

Inter se (also styled as inter sese) is a Legal Latin phrase that means "[a]mong or between themselves". The phrase is "used to distinguish rights or duties between two or more parties from their rights or duties to others."

In United Kingdom company law, a company's constitution has contractual effect between the company and its members. The statutory relationship has also been described by the House of Lords as a contract between the members and the company and between the members inter se.

In Australian constitutional law, the phrase appears in section 74 of the Australian Constitution, which refers to questions concerning the limits inter se of the constitutional powers of the Commonwealth and the states.

== See also ==
- Exclusive right
- Social contract
