= William Downes Willis =

Clergyman, theologian, and author

William Downes Willis (9 September 1790 – 22 October 1871) was a British clergyman, theologian, and author on religious subjects.

== Early life and education ==
Willis was the son of William Willis and Mary, daughter of landowner Robert Hamilton Smyth, of Lismore, Co. Down, of the family of the Viscounts Strangford. He was born at Dublin, where his father, an Army Captain, was then stationed. His middle name came from his paternal grandmother; the Downes family, of Rotherham, were wool merchants and yeoman landowners who married into the landed gentry Kent family of Kimberworth.

Willis was educated at Uppingham and Rugby (where he was a praepostor), then admitted in 1807 to Trinity College, Cambridge. He migrated in 1809 to Sidney Sussex College, graduating BA in 1813, and MA in 1819.

== Career ==
Ordained a deacon in 1813, and a priest in 1814, by Edward Venables-Vernon-Harcourt, Archbishop of York, Willis was curate- later priest- at Pontefract, Yorkshire until 1816. In 1817 he was appointed curate of Seamer, Yorkshire, and was then made vicar of Kirkby-in-Cleveland, Yorkshire, holding this position until 1841; additionally, in 1827, he was made a stipendiary curate at Walcot, Bath, Somerset. His next position was as rector of Elsted with Treyford and Didling, Sussex, which he held from 1841 until his death.

During his time working in Somerset, Willis became friendly with his colleague, the curate of Holy Trinity Church, Bath; following a murder that took place in 1828, where a maidservant had discovered the thefts committed by a male servant of the same household and was killed by him, Willis gave nine sermons denouncing, in 'forthright and vigorous' terms, such dishonesty and sinful conduct on the part of domestics; he was subsequently mobbed in the streets by servants who took exception to his words. Learning that his next sermon was to be interrupted, Willis took as his text Galatians 4.16: "Am I therefore become your enemy, because I tell you the truth?" In response to this, the congregation quietly left the church with no further trouble. Attendance increased to a new high following these events- on Christmas Day, 1829, 413 people (most working-class) received Communion, a number unequalled before or since. These sermons were published as 'Sermons for Servants' in 1829. He additionally wrote a volume on 'Simony, together with some account of the Puritan Feoffees, A.D. 1626', published in 1836 and reprinted in 1842. On a reprinting of this volume in 1865, The Ecclesiastic magazine considered in its review that Willis had 'done good service to the Church in seizing this opportunity for a renewed protest against one of the greatest evils that is eating out her vitality'. The Journal of Sacred Literature and Biblical Record considered that the book "ought to be read by every clergyman", concluding that despite "on sundry points" disagreeing with Willis, "his whole book shews (sic) that he is fearless, honest, and has the cause of real religion at heart", and that they were able to "earnestly recommend this able treatise".

From 1831, Willis was founder and Honorary Secretary of the Bath Friendly Society, an organisation aiming to 'encourage thrift and care in the way members ran their lives', maintaining strong links with Holy Trinity church. Other clubs, medical organisations and societies came into existence under the influence of the Bath Friendly Society, benefiting the local community.

Willis additionally served as Rural Dean of Bath from 1830 until 1840 (assisting George Henry Law, Bishop of Bath and Wells during that time), in which year he was appointed a Prebendary of Wells Cathedral. He was a correspondent of John Henry Newman (prior to his conversion to Roman Catholicism) on subjects including the increase of control of church property by the Evangelicals through purchase of advowsons.

== Personal life ==
Willis died 22 October 1871. He had married, in 1822, Dorothy, daughter of William Stephenson Preston, of Warcop Hall, Westmorland. They had four sons and four daughters, none of whom had issue; the two elder sons died as a schoolboy and as a lieutenant in the 9th Royal Lancers in India, respectively, and the two younger died young. One daughter- the youngest- died young, the three elder daughters remaining unmarried and living together at Molesdene, Rusthall Common, Tunbridge Wells, along with Julia Budd (1800-1877), "for 50 years the faithful and devoted nurse and friend in the family". Willis's brother, John Walpole Willis, was a colonial judge and author of legal texts. His brother's descendants include Frederick Smythe Willis, Mayor of Willoughby, New South Wales, and the politician and historian John William Willis-Bund.

== Writings ==
Sermons for Servants (1829)
Suggestions for the regulation of church patronage, preferment, &c, in a letter to the Archbishop of Canterbury (1835)
Simony, together with some account of the History of the Puritan Feoffees, A.D. 1626 (1836)
God the supreme disposer of kingdoms: a sermon on Dan. iv. 32. on the day of the coronation of Queen Victoria (1838)
Outlines of proposals for the adjustment of the education question between the Church and the Committee of Privy Council (1848)
