= Roger Therry =

Irish-Australian jurist (1800–1874)

Sir Roger Therry (22 April 1800 – 17 May 1874) was an Irish-Australian jurist and member of the New South Wales Legislative Council.
