= Yelland =

Village in Devon, England

Coordinates: 51.069°N 4.147°W

- Location within Devon
- Population: 2,000
- Civil parish: Fremington
- District: North Devon
- Shire county: Devon
- Region: South West
- Country: England
- Sovereign state: United Kingdom
- Police: Devon and Cornwall
- Fire: Devon and Somerset
- Ambulance: South Western
- UK Parliament: North Devon

Yelland is a village of 2,000 inhabitants situated in North Devon between Instow and Fremington in the English county of Devon. Yelland is included within the parish of Fremington.

== Amenities ==
There is a garage, and a small industrial park. Residents use the nearest major village Fremington, or the slightly smaller village of Instow for their daily needs. Supermarkets are located in the nearest towns - Barnstaple and Bideford. There is no church situated in the village.

Regular bus services are operated by Stagecoach Devon. The nearest railway station is Barnstaple railway station, and Exeter International Airport is the nearest passenger international airport by road. The nearest international ferry port is at Plymouth.

Children in the area generally attend Fremington or Instow Primary Schools at primary school age, and Bideford College, Pilton Community College or The Park Community School at secondary school age. College students attend Bideford College's sixth form, Petroc (formerly North Devon College), or may travel further afield.

== Archaeology ==
Near Lower Yelland Farm is a Bronze Age megalithic site consisting of a double stone row. They are unusual in being sited at the river's edge rather than on higher moorland. Since its construction, thousands of years ago, the site has been smothered by silt from the widening of the River Taw. The stones are no longer visible.

== Walking trails ==
Visitors to Yelland and the surrounding area enjoy the views and scenic paths for walking. The Tarka Trail and South West Coast Path are easily accessible from the Yelland Power Station Road. Also Lower Yelland Nature Reserve.

== East Yelland Coal-fired Power Station ==
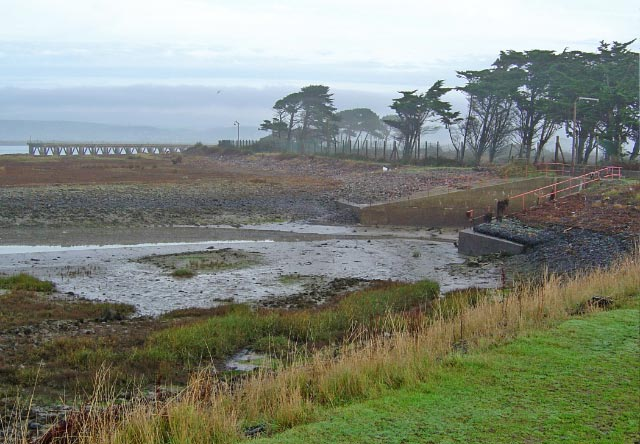
The former Yelland Power Station site

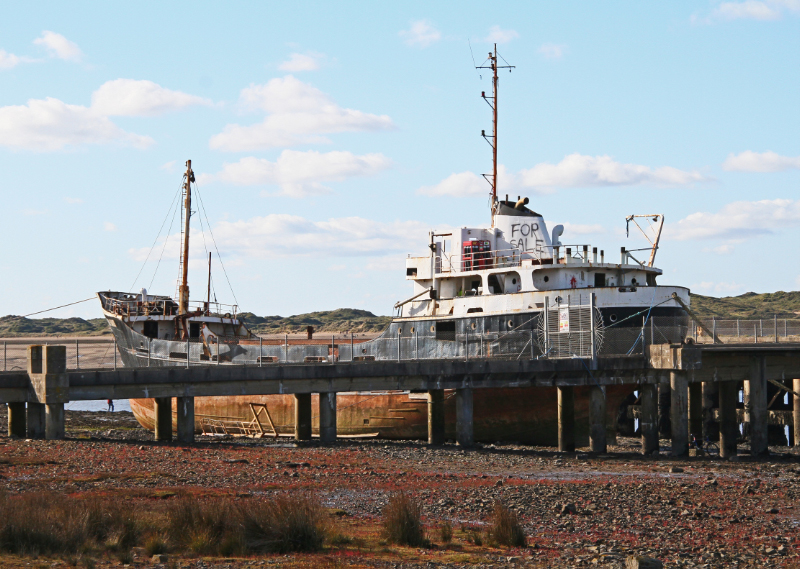
The jetty which once served the power station

The East Yelland Power Station was once an operational coal-fired electricity production plant located in a partially hidden area on the estuary, next to the Tarka Trail. The power station was one of only two located to the west of Hinkley Point.

The power station was sanctioned in September 1949, and an extension approved in June 1950. The first generating set was commissioned in July 1953 and subsequent sets in November 1953, September 1954, October 1956, December 1956, and October 1957. The power station was formally opened on 21 April 1955 by Lord Fortescue. The station had a net capability to deliver 170 MW of electricity from six Parsons 31 MW turbo-alternators. Steam was derived from eleven 180,000 lb/hr Thompson radiant heat boilers were fired by twin chain grate stokers delivering 253 kg/s of steam at 42.7 bar and 468 °C. Coal was delivered by river to a dedicated coaling jetty adjacent to the station. Cooling water to condense steam in the plant was drawn from the river estuary. There was also a 225 kW diesel engine house service set.

East Yelland power station capacity and output
Year	1954	1955	1956	1957	1958	1961	1962	1963	1967	1972	1979	1981	1982
Capacity MW	56	85	85	143	176	186	204	204	204	194	180	180	170
Output GWh	128.47	361.57	392.61	511.57	653.86	498	541.3	658.7	761.46	510.76	74.8	3.1	14.54

Output GWh

In the year ending 31 March 1981 the station delivered just 0.2 per cent of its capability. In March 1984, it was announced by the Central Electricity Generating Board that the power station would close by the end of October that year.

Fuel for the power station was obtained from coal mines in South Wales, and was transported across the Bristol Channel onto a jetty specially constructed for the power station. However, due to the closure of the coal mines in the 1980s, coal would be more expensive to obtain from other areas of the country. Therefore, it was more economical to close the power station.

Today, most of the power station, which covered an area of 3.1ha, has been demolished.
