= Charles Ethelbert Foweraker =

New Zealand botanist (1886–1964)

- Born: 1886; Waimate, South Canterbury, New Zealand
- Died: 24 March 1964
- Occupation(s): Botanist, Forester, Academic
- Known for: Mountain plants, Rainforest research
- Spouse: (Margaret) Jane ("Jean") Willis
- Children: 1 son, 1 daughter
- Parent(s): William Foweraker, Harriette Frances née Morgan

Academic background
- Education: University of Otago, Downing College, Cambridge
- Alma mater: Canterbury College

Charles Ethelbert Foweraker was a New Zealand botanist, forester, and academic, primarily focused on mountain plants and rainforests in New Zealand.

== Early life and education ==
Foweraker was born at Waimate, South Canterbury, New Zealand in 1886 to Waimate stationmaster William Foweraker (1846–1915), formerly of Pleasant Point, Timaru, and his second wife Harriette Frances, daughter of Robert Morgan, of Belfast. The Foweraker family were of Honiton, Devon; William came to New Zealand aboard the British Empire, arriving on 6 September 1864.

Foweraker studied at Waimate District School and in 1899 qualified for a junior scholarship for his first two years at Waimate High School. He spent much of his free time visiting grasslands and bush in the nearby Hunter Hills, developing a collection of microscope slides and field notebooks, and as a young man, he corresponded with the naturalists George Thomson and Robert Malcolm Laing from 1905.

Having decided on a career in education, and having been a pupil-teacher since 1904, he trained in Christchurch to become a fully certified teacher whilst teaching at Waimate Primary School; from 1910 to 1912 he was first assistant master at the Waimate High School. At the same time he undertook university studies, taking an extramural BA in 1914 from Canterbury College. His first formal biological education came under the tutelage of Charles Chilton; in 1916, he took a first-class honours MA from Canterbury College. His parents died within a year of each other before his graduation. In 1911, Foweraker became a correspondent of the eminent botanist Leonard Cockayne, who sought information for his book Vegetation of New Zealand, then in progress. Cockayne referred to Foweraker early in their association as "a young man of promise", and hoped to "show him that the finding of 'rare' plants is in itself a matter of no importance and that a 'new' species is of no interest unless it leads us to a new biological observation." The two men became friends and colleagues, going on research expeditions in Marlborough and Canterbury; some of their work was published in 1916. They remained correspondents until the end of Cockayne's life.

== Career ==
=== Early career ===
In 1914, Foweraker accepted the position of demonstrator in biology at Canterbury College, being responsible for a good deal of undergraduate laboratory work, lecturing on botany, and conducting field excursions with students at the newly established Cass Mountain Biological Station; "his enthusiasm encouraged the first wave of research by Botany students at Cass and around Christchurch." In 1916, following the completion of his MA, his thesis, "The Mat Plants, Cushion Plants and Allied Forms of the Cass River Bed"- dealing with the morphological biology of these plants- was published in the Transactions of the New Zealand Institute as part of the "Notes from the Canterbury College Mountain Biological Station" series. Many photographs taken by Foweraker were included in other papers in the series.

=== Military service ===
Foweraker served as a private in France with the New Zealand Expeditionary Force from 1916 to 1918, initially in the 1st Canterbury Infantry Regiment, then, following a hand injury, in the New Zealand Medical Corps, leaving with the rank of corporal having also served in the Near East. Whilst recovering from his injury, he had taken botany lectures at Birkbeck College, University of London; after the war, he was awarded a NZEF scholarship for advanced research in botany at Downing College, Cambridge. Charles Chilton encouraged Foweraker to take an interest in forestry, aware that Canterbury College intended to establish a School of Forestry.

=== Later career ===
In 1921, Foweraker returned to Canterbury College, lecturing in botany. From 1924 to 1934, he was the founding lecturer of the School of Forestry, of which he later became director. He went on to be senior lecturer in botany at Canterbury University College, retiring in 1950. His assistant lecturer was Frank Hutchinson, forming a "good, balanced team"- "the former [Foweraker] conscientious, dedicated, scholarly, and kindly; the latter energetic, incisive, forthright, and reportedly an inspirational teacher."

From the early 1920s, Foweraker was employed by the New Zealand State Forest Service- alongside Leonard Cockayne, William Roy McGregor, and Charles Chilton- to conduct and supervise studies on indigenous forests of New Zealand. One of Foweraker's specific areas of research was the Westland rain forest. Foweraker's research led to the conclusion that regulated forests of the valuable but rapidly diminishing silver pine (Manoao colensoi), useful for its light-resisting qualities, could be established in Westland, instead of using kahikatea (Dacrycarpus dacrydioides) and rimu (Dacrydium cupressinum); a related ecological discovery was that silver pine was a successor to rimu as a forest species, the latter observed to be dying out in areas of dense silver pine growth. Foweraker's work was identified by Leon MacIntosh Ellis, Director of Forests in the State Forest Service, as an "important study, which will provide the economic key to the re-establishment and practical management of the South Island rain forests." By 1925, Foweraker had also completed a report on the prospect of using indigenous forests as timber supply, according to Ellis's intention to pursue sustained-yield (i.e. renewable) management, but in the event it was decided that exotic afforestation would take precedence. Foweraker, wanting to present his findings to a wider audience, published them in Te Kura Ngahere (since 1936, the New Zealand Journal of Forestry), a journal newly founded by the Forestry Club of the Canterbury College School of Forestry, and gave lectures on the subjects he had researched. The SFS's move away from ecological considerations and shift towards a forestry practice based on exotic afforestation meant that eventually only Cockayne continued to produce reports for them.

=== Writings and publications ===
Foweraker undertook research into and wrote on the subject of the vegetation of the Cass Valley, and produced government reports and articles on forestry. He was not a very prolific author of work for publication, being more focused on his students. He was however noted for his "great skill as a photographer"; a large number of photographs- mainly taken between 1914 and 1930, including of the area around the Cass Field Station but also of other botanical subjects- were preserved on glass plates at the University of Canterbury School of Botany; forestry photographs were given to the university's School of Forestry. An archive of originals and copies of Foweraker's personal papers and diaries was created at the University of Canterbury Library.

=== Other positions and responsibilities ===
Foweraker was an active member of the Canterbury Philosophical Institute and was a fellow of the Linnean Society of London. He served on the controlling authorities of Riccarton Bush, Peel Forest, and Arthur's Pass National Park.

== Personal life ==
In 1919, Foweraker married his former student (Margaret) Jane (1893–1989), known as "Jean", daughter of R. B. B. Willis, JP, of Southbridge, Canterbury, and great-granddaughter of the colonial judge John Walpole Willis. They had a son and a daughter. The Fowerakers lived in the Cashmere Hills above Christchurch; Jean Foweraker, an alpine plant enthusiast and founder member of the Canterbury Alpine Garden Society, lived in the family home until the 1980s. The Alpine House at Christchurch Botanic Gardens, opened in 1963, was in 1980 renamed Foweraker House, in recognition of her many donations of alpine plants.

Foweraker was known for his "kindly and gentlemanly nature", "the interest and enthusiasm he engendered in his students", and devotion to "the needs of the student uppermost... [he] went to great trouble to see that the graduates were put in positions, even in the hard times of the 1929–1935 depression."

== Tributes ==
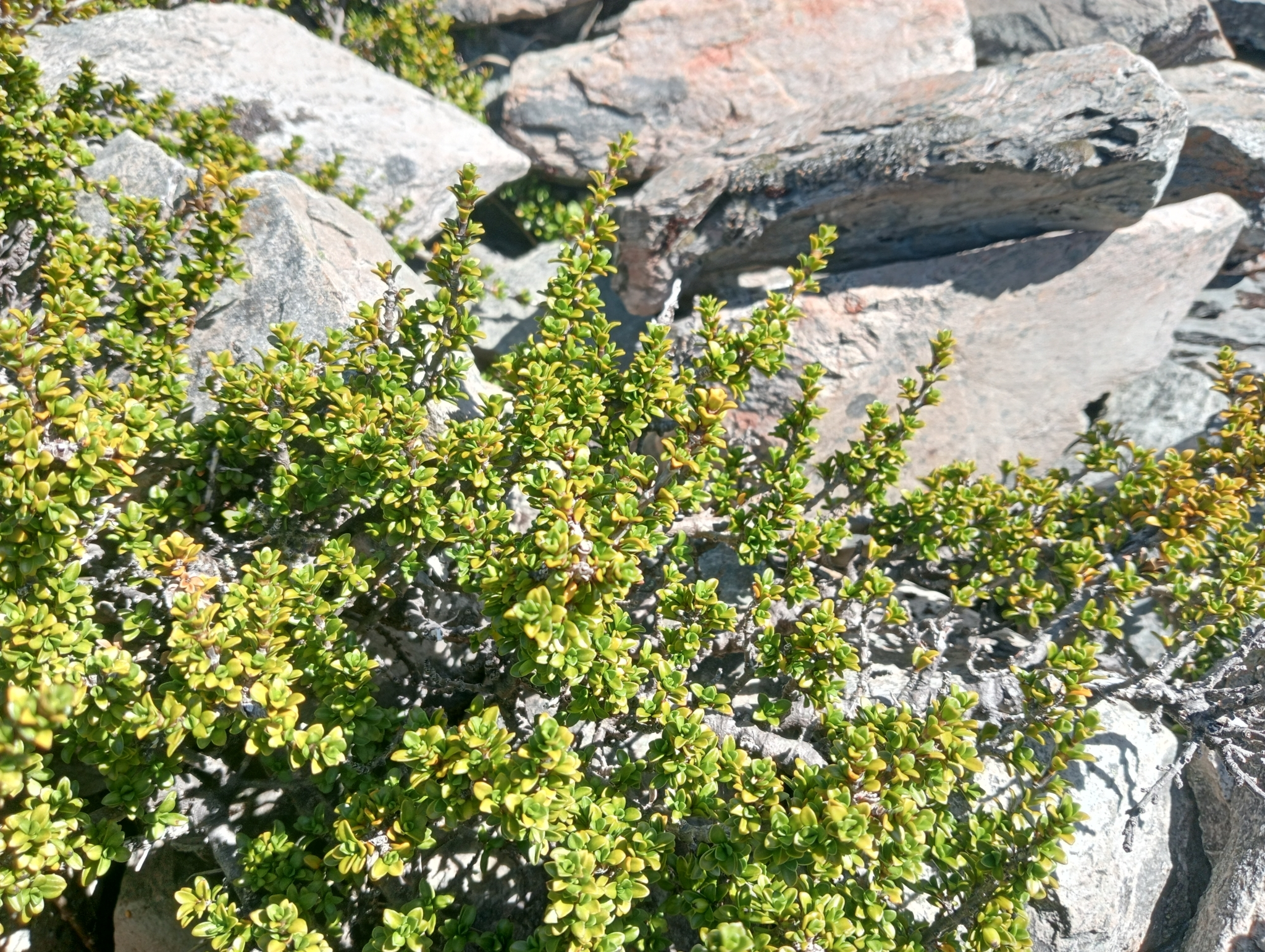
Coprosma fowerakeri

In 1916, Cockayne named a hybrid of Ewartia sinclairii and Helichrysum bellidioides after Foweraker, Helichrysum fowerakeri, "in the days before the importance of wild hybrids were recognised."

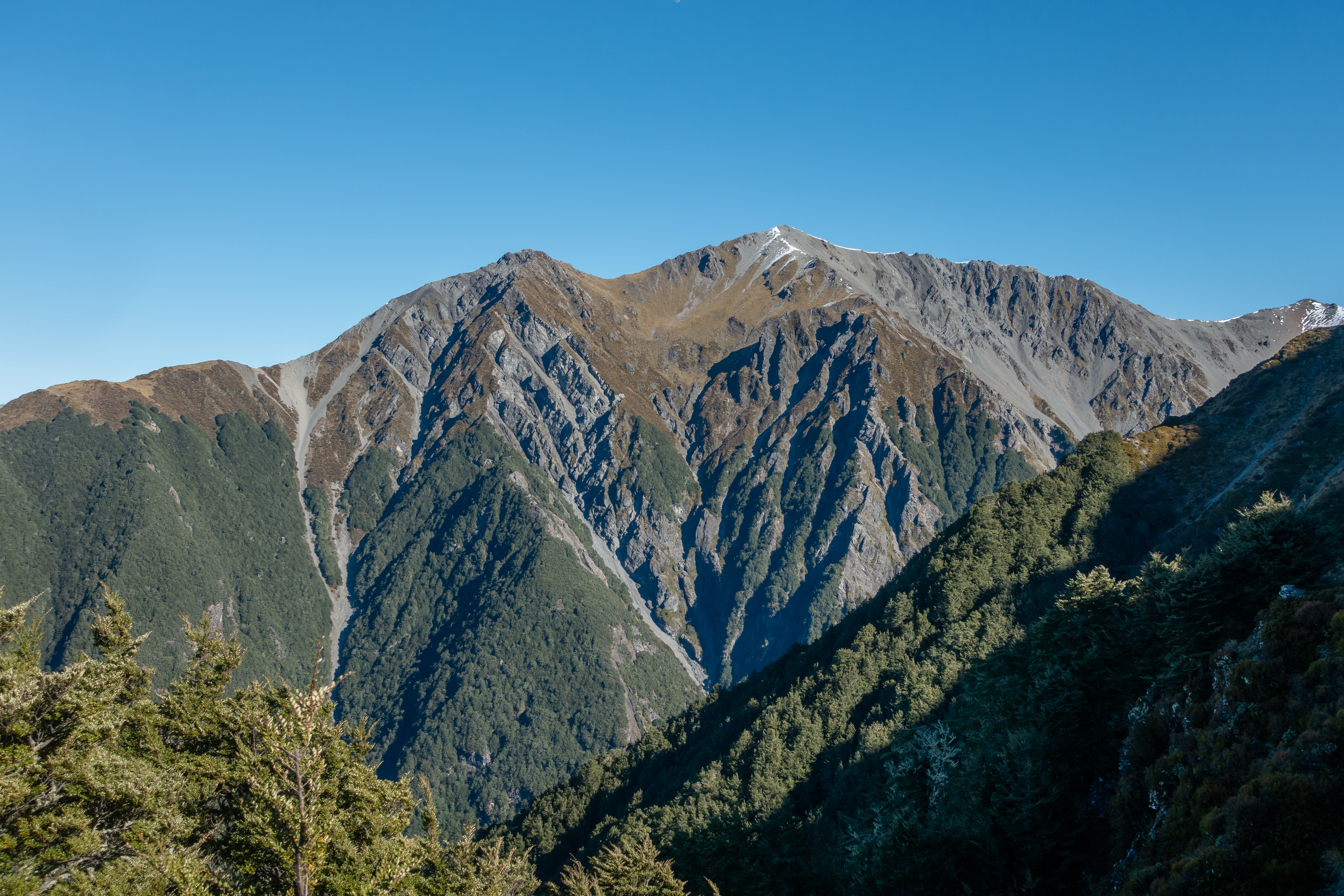
Mount Foweraker

After Foweraker's death, the ridge between the Sugarloaf Bush Valley and Chilton Valley at Cass was named the "Foweraker Spur" in his honour: "often this is the route by which young botanists reach the summit of Mt Sugarloaf in their search for interesting plants." Mount Foweraker is named in his honour. In 1974, the University of Canterbury formally opened the Charles Foweraker Field Station at Harihari in recognition of his work. In 2003, a newly discovered species of Coprosma from the South Island was named Coprosma fowerakeri in his honour. Previously included within Coprosma pseudocuneata, it is "distinguished by its low spreading habit; stout, recurved lateral branches that often root in contact with soil; fleshy-coriaceous, almost succulent, dark green to bronze-green leaves; conspicuously denticulate, shortly sheathing interpetiolar stipules; bright orange fruit ... and preference for alpine habitats."
