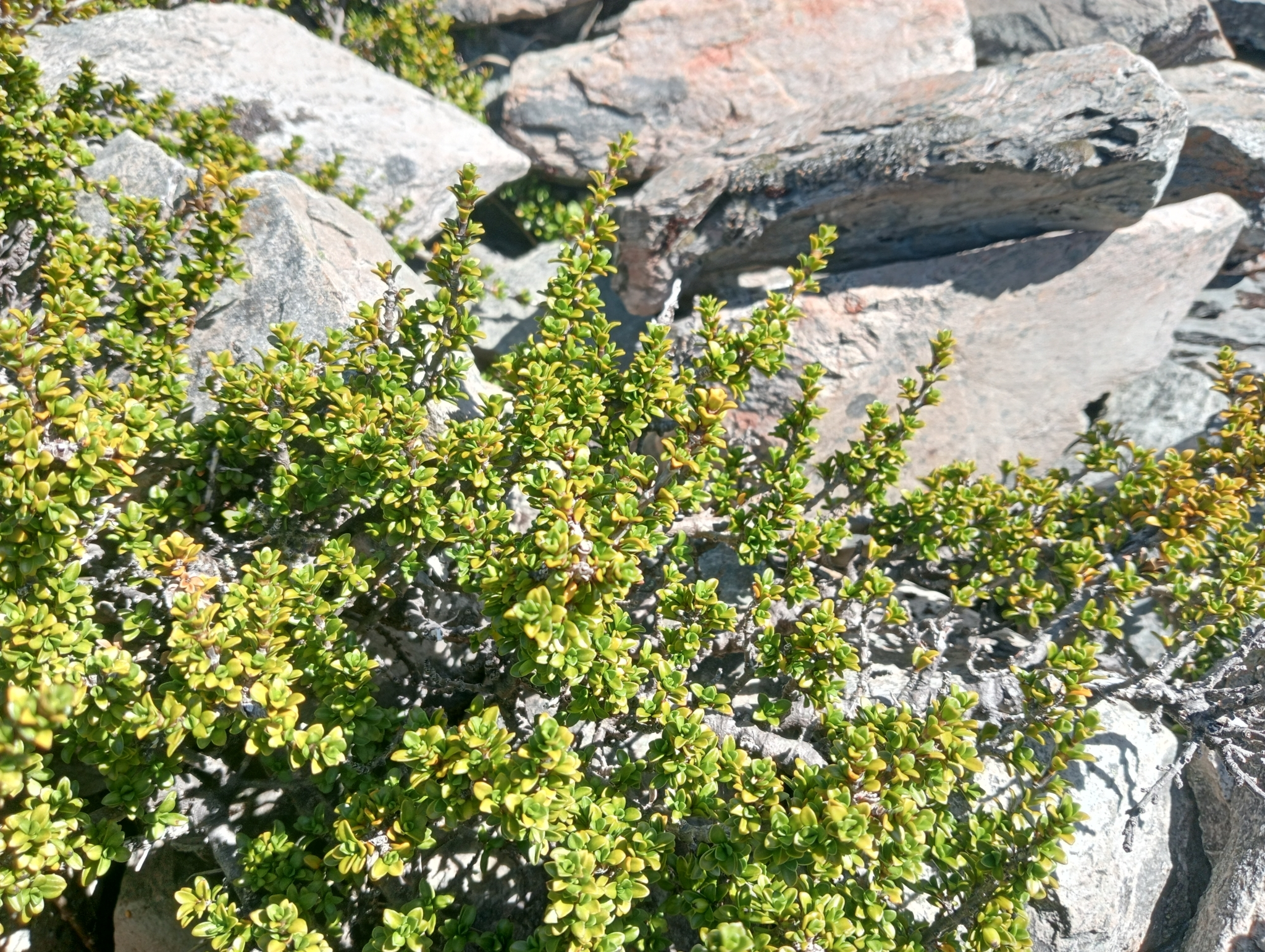

Scientific classification
- Kingdom: Plantae
- Clade: Tracheophytes
- Clade: Angiosperms
- Clade: Eudicots
- Clade: Asterids
- Order: Gentianales
- Family: Rubiaceae
- Genus: Coprosma
- Species: C. fowerakeri

Binomial name
- Coprosma fowerakeri D.A.Norton & de Lange

= Coprosma fowerakeri =

Species of flowering plant

Coprosma fowerakeri is a species of Coprosma found in the South Island of New Zealand described in 2003. It was previously included within C. pseudocuneata.

It was named after the New Zealand botanist Charles Ethelbert Foweraker.
