= Alan Clarkson =

Alan Clarkson may refer to:

- Alan Clarkson (priest)
- Alan Clarkson (swimmer)
