= Frederick Smythe Willis =

Australian municipal official

Frederick Smyth (later used the spelling Smythe) Willis (1866 – 30 October 1910) was a British-born Australian municipal official who served as an alderman and as mayor of Willoughby, New South Wales, and in his professional capacity as a public accountant served as a founding member, and first honourable treasurer, of the Corporation of Accountants of Australia.

== Early life and education ==
The son of Robert Willis, J.P., an Oxford graduate, militia Captain and farmer on the Isle of Man, Frederick's grandfather was the colonial judge John Walpole Willis, younger brother of the clergyman and theologian William Downes Willis. Following the family's arrival in New Zealand, where his father bought farms and became an agriculturist, also serving as a local government official, Frederick was educated at Christ's College, Christchurch, in Condell's house, from 1880 to 1882.

== Career ==
With his elder brother, William, Frederick went to Australia, where he settled at Sydney and entered public accountancy, eventually becoming senior partner in Frederick S. Willis & Company, public accountants. Working as a liquidator for Wilson & Harriott, solicitors, Willis was also the provisional manager of the Mount Werong Mining Company, as well as several other companies.

In 1905, Willis played an integral role as one of the founding members of the Corporation of Accountants of Australia (now the Institute of Chartered Accountants Australia), and was elected honourable treasurer. He was subsequently re-elected to the position. The organisation had the aim of providing 'a special organisation for Accountants and Auditors, and to do all such things as from time to time may be necessary to elevate the status and advance the interests of the profession.'

== Personal life ==
Willis married Mary, the youngest daughter of Rev. David Bruce, D.D., of Auckland and Sydney, on 5 October 1892. They had a daughter, Mary. A resident of Willoughby, Sydney, Willis served from 1896 to 1902 as an alderman, and as mayor in 1901. He was also a justice of the peace. He was a Freemason, like his father and several brothers, serving as Worshipful Master of Lodge Ionic and of Lodge Kuring-gai.

In 1910, whilst visiting family in New Zealand, Willis died following a tram accident on 10 October in Grey Lynn, in which he was initially thought to have suffered only minor injuries.

Probate was granted in April 1911, and his estate with a net value of just over £19,000 (equivalent to over £2 million in 2022) was bequeathed to his widow and daughter. His wife's sister, Jessie Sinclair Bruce, married the politician, social reformer and medical practitioner Richard Arthur. His nephew was the engineer and archaeologist Leslie R. H. Willis; a niece, Jean, was an alpine plant cultivator and genealogist, and wife of the botanist Charles Ethelbert Foweraker.
