= Jean Foweraker =

New Zealand botanist

Margaret Jane "Jean" Foweraker née Willis (21 September 1893 – 3 May 1989) was a New Zealand botanist who specialised in alpine plants – with a particular interest in alpine varieties of crocus – and was a key figure in their popularisation in New Zealand. She was the primary contributor of alpine plants to Christchurch Botanic Gardens, who renamed their Alpine House in recognition of her. She was also author of a series of genealogical works.

== Early life and education ==
Margaret Jane Willis, usually called "Jean", was the fourth of five daughters (she having also an elder brother) of R. B. B. Willis, JP, and Jessie Eyre, daughter of landowner Thomas Cawkwell, of Panmure. When she was growing up, her father farmed at Te Ahuahu and Ōmāpere (where he was also a local government official), returning – as the eldest son – to take over his parents' farm at Southbridge, Canterbury after their deaths. Her great-grandfather was the colonial judge John Walpole Willis, and an uncle was the accountant and local government official Frederick Smythe Willis.

After Southbridge District High School, she went to Canterbury College for her degree, at one time studying under Charles Ethelbert Foweraker, to whom she subsequently became engaged. Just before completing her degree, she went to England to meet her fiancé, then studying at Downing College, Cambridge having returned from service in the First World War, and they married in 1919, "from the home of ... one of New Zealand's most eminent scholars", the economist John B. Condliffe, then teaching at the New Zealand Convalescent Hospital at Hornchurch, London, and who was awarded the Sir Thomas Gresham scholarship at the University of Cambridge that year prior to his return to New Zealand in 1920.

== Career ==
With her husband, Jean Foweraker established a garden including alpine plants at their home at Hackthorne Road in the hills at Cashmere, reckoned "a plantsman's paradise" and with "crocus species naturalised throughout". The Fowerakers were "famous locally" for this garden (and, later, the garden they developed at the nearby Four Winds estate to which they moved) – described as incorporating "an arc... with pink roses... a prunus tree, with cinerarias underneath it... an asparagus bed... a bed with lily of the valley in it... some hellebores... it was a pretty garden... with levels, and steps." The Fowerakers' garden, and Jean's advocacy and cultivation of alpine plants, was influential in establishing alpine plants in New Zealand. She played an integral part in the foundation of the Canterbury Alpine Plant Society (now the New Zealand Alpine Garden Society) in 1960, and was a major contributor to the Christchurch Botanic Gardens alpine plant collection from 1979, the Alpine House – established in 1963 – being renamed "Foweraker House" in 1980. She, and co-founder of the NZAGS, Bee Hannon, were regarded as "leaders who were welcoming gentle people... excellent gardeners... prepared to share their experience, visiting members' gardens and helping out with tips and advice." In the early years of the society, she "was a regular exhibitor with her 'basket of cut flowers', rarely without its complement of crocus species"; this, and her "monthly lists of 'Plants in Flower' in the Society's Bulletin", were of primary influence in impressing upon the society's members the "value of crocus".

In a 1985 guest editorial in the Canterbury Botanical Society Journal, she wrote of her, and her husband's, history with that society, recalling: "The development of the Society over the years has been, for me, an interesting one. It has had its ups and downs; but now with those activities recorded in the monthly Newsletter taking place, it must certainly be flourishing." She recounted the Society's first Summer Camp in 1970, at the Black Birch Range, Marlborough, at the observatory at an altitude of 1,500 metres – "one stepped out the door into a sea of Celmisia spectabilis, a good season for the flowering of Celmisia in the region." She also reflected on the growth of the Cass Field Station in recounting her first trip to Cass, with her husband's close friend Charles Chilton and his wife, where they stayed in a cottage which "consisted of the kitchen with a small room leading off containing two bunks, occupied by the Professor [Chilton] and his wife ... the student quarters were reached from the porch and contained six bunks. As there was only one bunkroom for students, ladies and men were there at different times." On subsequent trips, with her husband and his students, she "took over the responsibilities of the cooking", encountering "real difficulties" in doing so, with "long-legged bodies sitting around the open fireplace, a line of dripping socks above."

The historian Margaret Alington undertook research and made notes for an as-yet-unpublished biographical entry on Jean Foweraker for inclusion in the Dictionary of New Zealand Biography.

Jean Foweraker was also the author of four volumes of genealogical research into her paternal and maternal ancestry, which were posthumously published.

== Personal life ==
In 1919, she married the botanist and forester Charles Ethelbert Foweraker, under whom she had at one point studied. They had a son, a geologist in British Columbia, and a daughter, who worked for the Department of Australian External Affairs and British Foreign Service, including at Saigon and Warsaw, and in Korea.
