= Mount Foweraker =

Mountain in the Canterbury Region of New Zealand

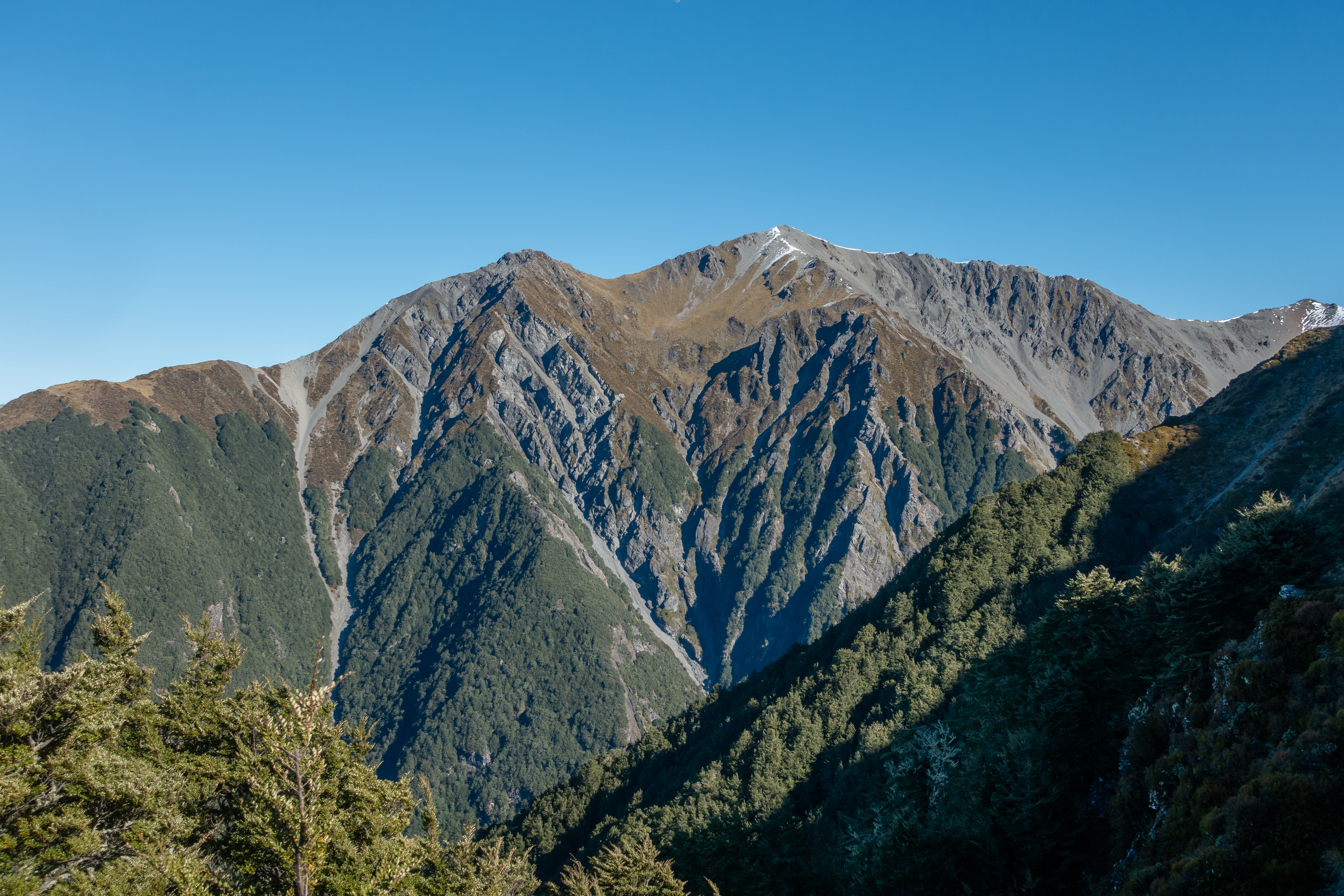
- East aspect

Highest point
- Elevation: 1,804 m (5,919 ft)
- Prominence: 308 m (1,010 ft)
- Parent peak: Mount Wilson
- Isolation: 2.73 km (1.70 mi)
- Coordinates: 42°58′25″S 171°41′50″E

Naming
- Etymology: Charles Ethelbert Foweraker

Geography
- Location within New Zealand
- Interactive map of Mount Foweraker
- Location: South Island
- Country: New Zealand
- Region: Canterbury
- Protected area: Arthur's Pass National Park
- Parent range: Southern Alps; Polar Range
- Topo map: Topo50 BV21

Mount Foweraker is an 1,804-metre-elevation (5,919-foot) mountain in the Canterbury Region of New Zealand.

== Description ==
Mount Foweraker is located 107 kilometres (66 mi) northwest of Christchurch in Arthur's Pass National Park in the South Island. It is part of the Polar Range of the Southern Alps. Precipitation runoff from the mountain's slopes drains to the Waimakariri River. Topographic relief is significant as the summit rises 1,240 metres (4,068 feet) above the Waimakariri River Valley in three kilometres, and 1,000 metres (3,281 feet) above Sudden Valley Stream in 1.5 kilometres. The nearest higher peak is Dome, 2.7 kilometres to the west. The mountain's toponym honours Charles Ethelbert Foweraker (1886–1964), a New Zealand botanist, forester, and academic. His focus on mountain plants and rainforests in New Zealand contributed to the understanding of South Island vegetation. He spent a considerable amount of time based at the Cass Field Station (8.5 km southeast of peak) where he taught and researched in the area surrounding the field station and this then-unnamed mountain. The mountain's toponym has been officially approved by the New Zealand Geographic Board.

== Climate ==
Based on the Köppen climate classification, Mount Foweraker is located in a marine west coast (Cfb) climate zone. Prevailing westerly winds blow moist air from the Tasman Sea onto the mountains, where the air is forced upwards by the mountains (orographic lift), causing moisture to drop in the form of rain or snow. The months of December through February offer the most favourable weather for viewing or climbing this peak.

== Gallery ==
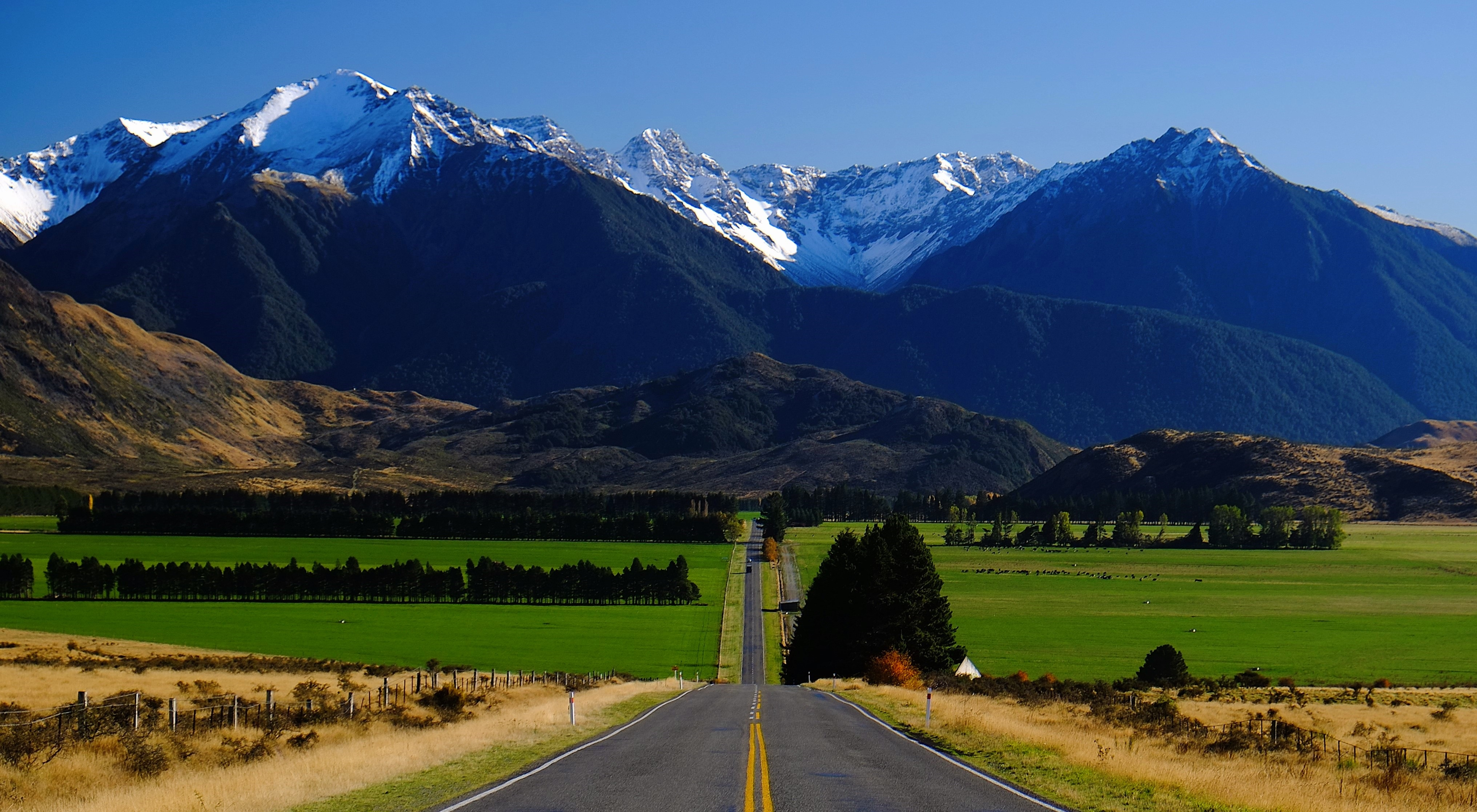
Polar Range with Foweraker to left

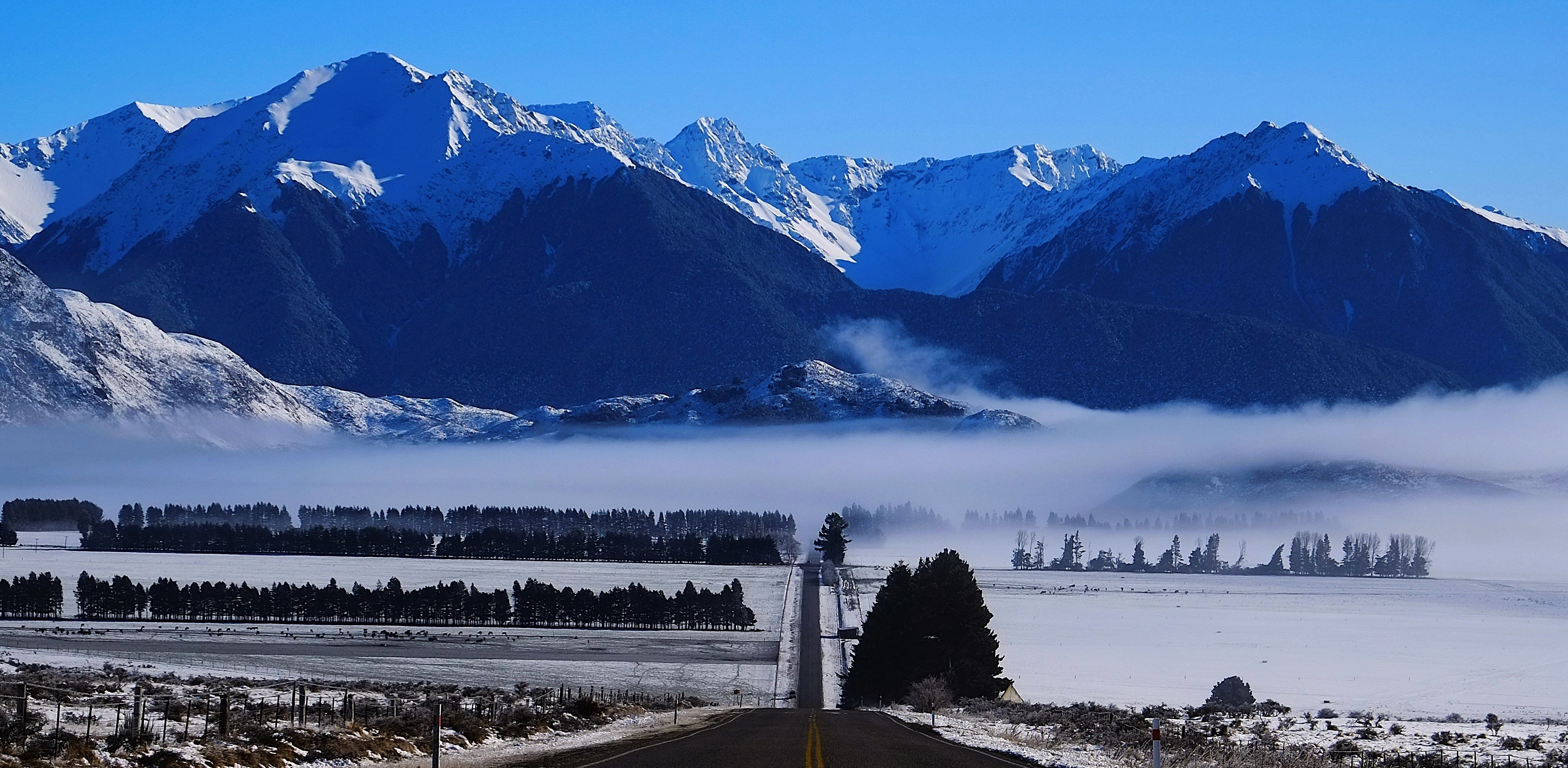
Polar Range in winter with Foweraker to left

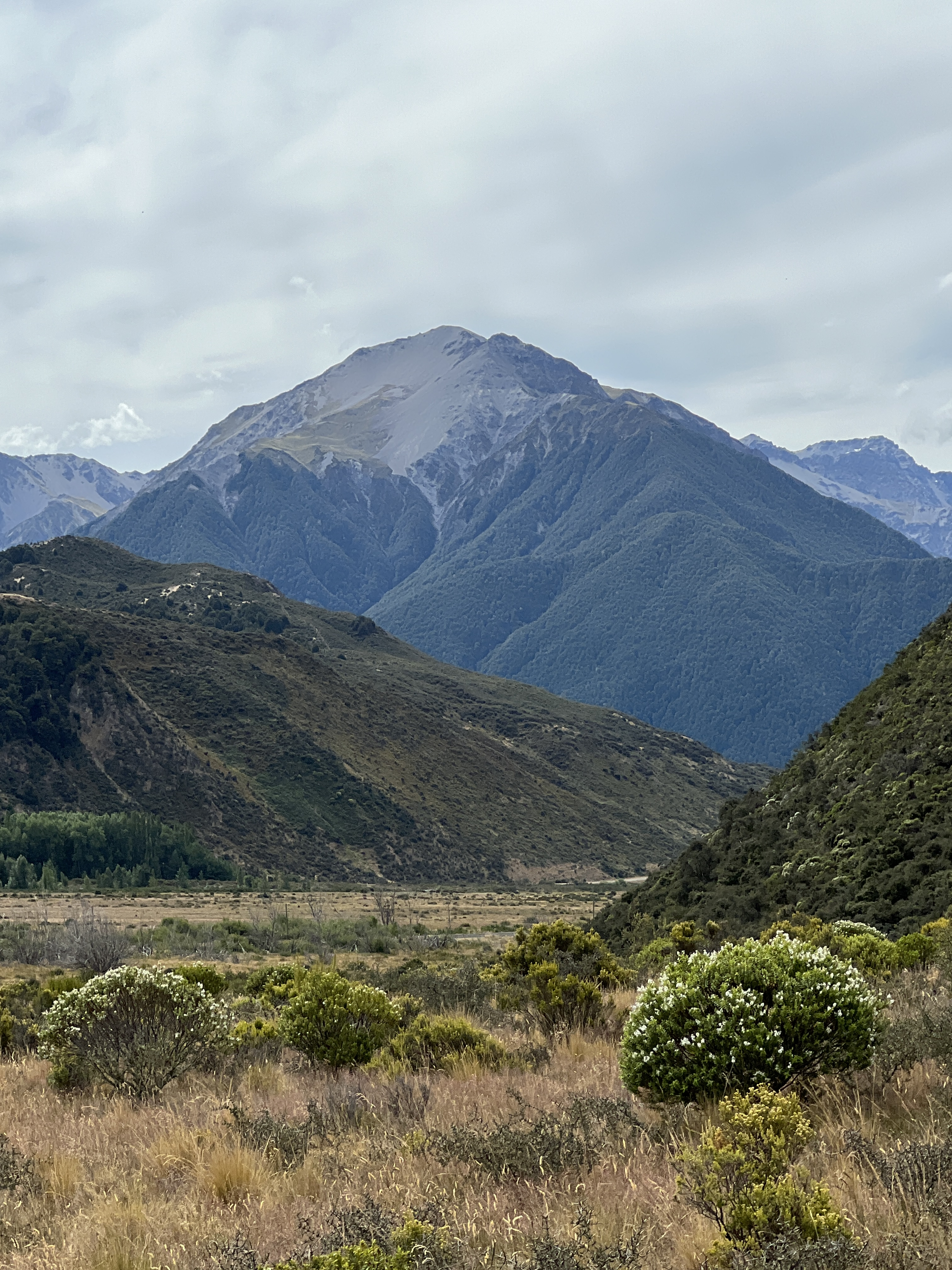
Mount Foweraker

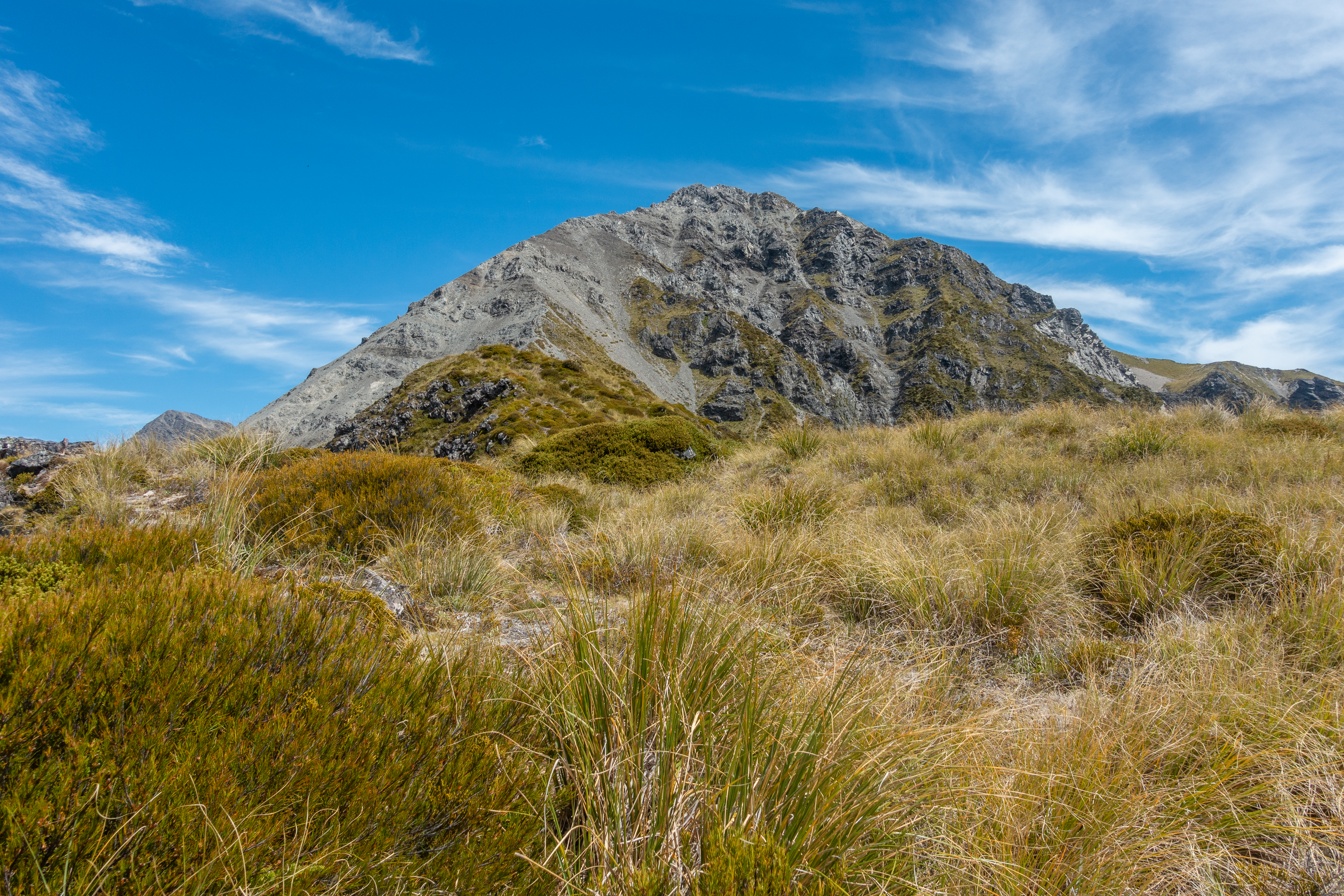
Top of Mount Foweraker

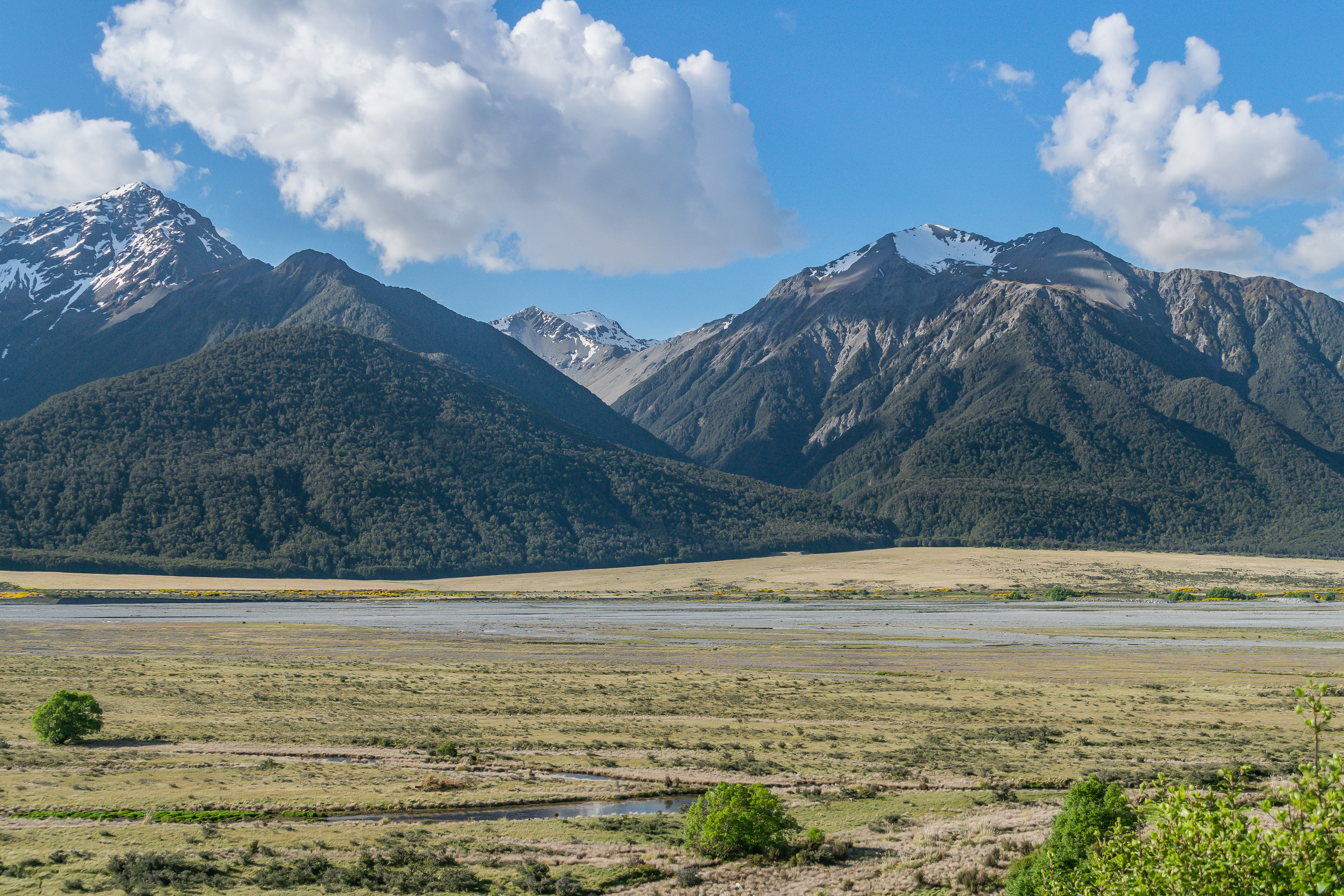
South aspect of Mount Foweraker (right), with Dome (1,945m) to left

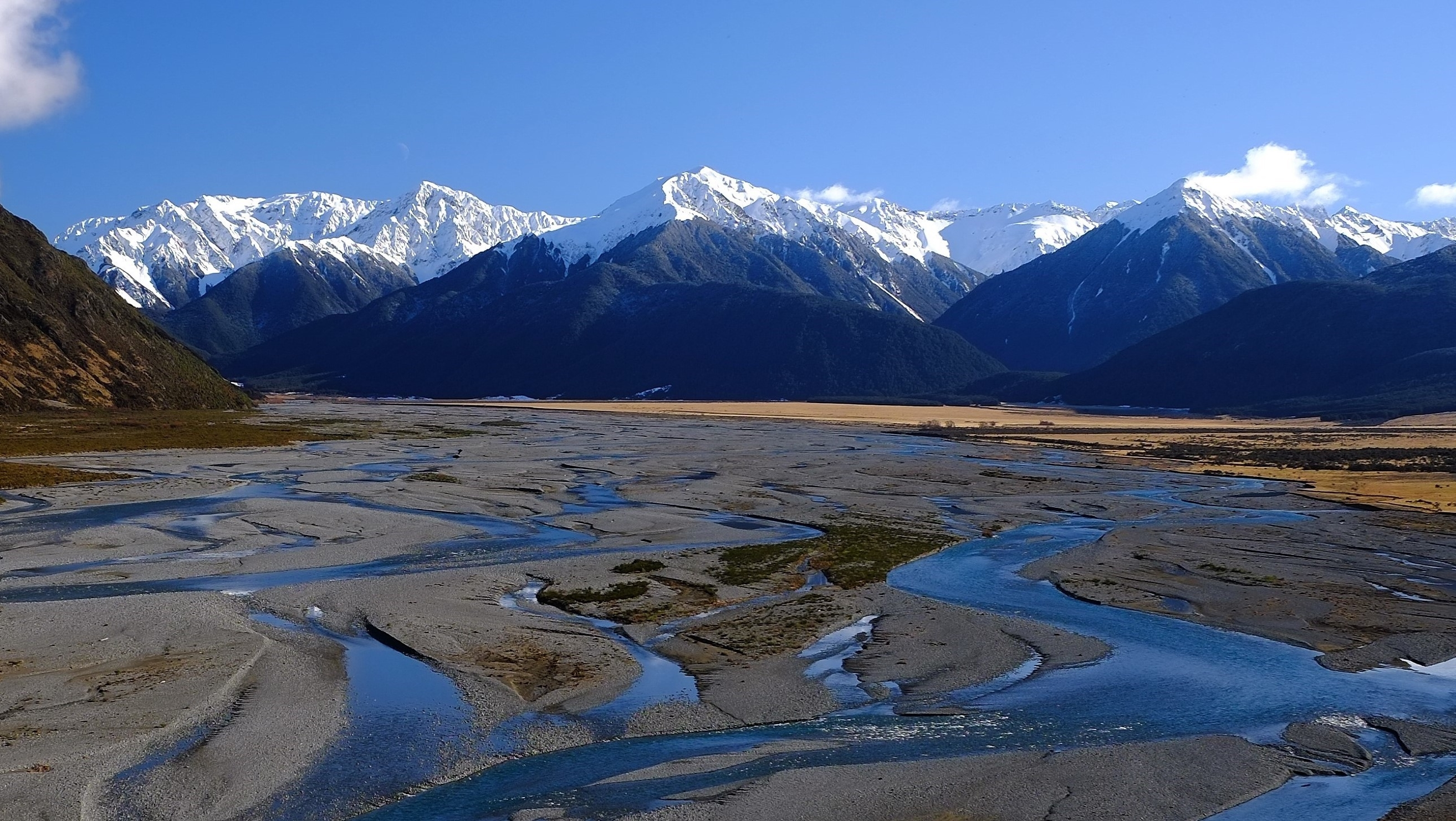
Southeast aspect of Mount Foweraker centred

== See also ==
- List of mountains of New Zealand by height
