= Alexander Balmain Bruce =

Scottish churchman and theologian

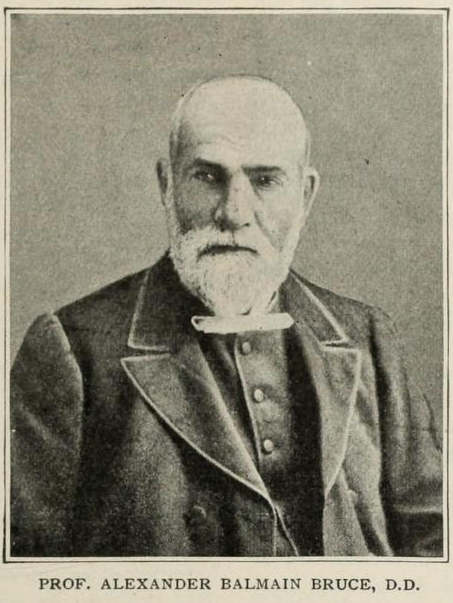

Alexander Balmain Bruce (31 January 1831 – 7 August 1899) was a Scottish churchman and theologian. He was a minister of the Free Church of Scotland.

== Life ==
He was born at Aberdalgie in the parish of Abernethy, Perthshire, on 13 January 1831, was the son of David Bruce, a farmer. His elder brother was the Presbyterian minister David Bruce. He was educated at Auchterarder parish school.

At the Disruption of 1843 his father relocated with his family to Edinburgh.

Bruce entered Edinburgh University in 1845 and the divinity hall of the Free Church of Scotland in 1849. His early faith was subjected to severe trials during his studies, and he was at times 'precipitated down to the ground floor of the primaeval abyss.' These doubts, however, he surmounted and entered the Free Church ministry.

After acting as assistant, first at Ancrum and then at Lochwinnoch, he was called to Cardross in Dunbartonshire in 1859. In 1868, he was translated to the east Free Church at Broughty Ferry in Forfarshire, and in 1871 he published his studies on the gospels entitled The Training of the Twelve, which established his reputation as a biblical scholar and a writer of ability. They were originally delivered from the Cardross pulpit, and reached a second edition in 1877. In 1874, Bruce was Cunningham lecturer, taking as his subject The Humiliation of Christ (Edinburgh, 1876, 8vo; 2nd edit. 1881); and in 1875, on the death of Patrick Fairbairn, he was appointed to the chair of apologetics and New Testament exegesis in the Free Church Hall at Glasgow. In the twenty-four years during which he occupied this chair he exercised the strongest influence over students, both from his wide knowledge and on account of the magnetism of his mind. At the same time he published a number of exegetical works which established his fame with a wider circle. Among the more noteworthy were St. Paul's Conception of Christianity (1894), his 'Commentary on the Synoptic Gospels' in the Expositor's Greek Testament (1897), and The Epistle to the Hebrews: the First Apology for Christianity (1899). He and William Robertson Smith were the first Scottish scholars whose authority was regarded with respect among German biblical critics.

The boldness of Bruce's views was not, however, entirely pleasing to his colleagues in the Free Church. In 1889, he published The Kingdom of God; or, Christ's Teachings according to the Synoptic Gospels (Edinburgh, 8vo), a work which gave rise to considerable criticism owing to his treatment of the inspired writings. In 1890, the tendency of his views and those of Dr. Marcus Dods was considered by the general assembly, but that body came to the conclusion that while some of their statements had been unguarded, their writings were not at variance with the standards of the church (Howie, Reply to Letter of Professor Blaikie, 1890; Kere, Vivisection in Theology, 1890; Richardson, Dr. Bruce on the Kingdom of God, 1890; The Case Stated, 1890).

Bruce rendered great services to the music of his church. He acted as convener of the hymnal committees which issued the 'Free Church Hymn Book' in 1882, and in 1898 the 'Church Hymnary' for all the Scottish presbyterian churches. He was Gifford lecturer in Glasgow University for 1896–7, choosing as his subjects 'The Providential Order of the World' (London, 1897, 8vo) and 'The Moral Order of the World in Ancient and Modern Thought' (London, 1899, 8vo). From 1894 he assisted Canon T. K. Cheyne in editing the 'Theological Translation Library.'

Bruce died on 7 August 1899 at 32 Hamilton Park Terrace, Glasgow, and was buried on 10 August at Broughty Ferry.

== Family ==
In 1860 he married Jane Hunter Walker (1832–1900), daughter of James Walker of Fodderslee in Roxburghshire. She survived him with a son David, a Glasgow writer, partner in the firm of Mitchell & Bruce, and a daughter, who married Milward Valentine of Manchester and New York.

== Works ==
Besides the works mentioned he was the author of:

- 'The Chief End of Revelation,' London, 1881, 8vo.
- 'The Parabolic Teaching of Christ,' London, 1882, 8vo; new edit. 1889.
- 'The Galilean Gospel' ('Household Library of Exposition'), Edinburgh, 1884, 8vo.
- 'F. C. Baur and his Theory of the Origin of Christianity and of the New Testament' ('Present Day Tracts,' No. 38), London, 1885, 8vo.
- 'The Miraculous Element in the Gospels,' London, 1886, 8vo.
- 'The Life of William Denny,' London, 1888, 8vo; 2nd edit. 1889.
- 'Apologetics; or, the Cause of Christianity defensively Stated' ('International Theological Library'), Edinburgh, 1892, 8vo.
- 'With Open Face; or, Jesus mirrored in Matthew, Mark, and Luke,' London, 1896, 8vo.

St. Paul's Conception of Christianity, Edinburgh, 1896

Articles: 'Theological Agnosticism,' The American Journal of Theology, The University of Chicago Press, Jan. 1897

== See also ==
- Sir Alexander Balmain Bruce Valentine, his grandson
