= David Bruce (minister) =

Scots-born New Zealand Presbyterian minister and journalist

David Bruce DD (20 June 1824 – 15 December 1911) was a Scots-born Free Church of Scotland Presbyterian minister who helped to establish the church in Auckland, New Zealand. Bruce held many high ranking positions in the church in New Zealand before later moving to New South Wales and serving in a Sydney Parish.

== Life ==
He was born in Cramond, near Edinburgh on 20 June 1824 to David Bruce, a carpenter and farmer, and his wife, Margaret Robertson. The family moved to Aberdalgie in Perthshire soon afterwards. He was educated at Davidson's Classical Academy in Perth, then studied at Edinburgh University graduating MA in 1847 then studying theology at New College, Edinburgh.

He was licensed to preach by the Free Church of Scotland in 1851 and ordained in Aberdeen in January 1853. Bruce was offered positions in Boston, United States, and Montreal, Canada but instead chose a position in New Zealand. He boarded the SS Simlah, bound for Auckland in New Zealand, arriving there in June 1853. Here his Free Presbyterian parish covered all of North Auckland (Note: North Auckland at this time referred to an area that encompasses all of the modern Northland and Auckland regions). Upon arrival he was occupied with the administration of the church in Waterloo Quadrant. In 1862 he became convener for the Home Mission Committee, promoting the Free Church over the entire country, a position he held for two decades. The following year he left his parish and travelled the country to help establish new congregations. He was Moderator of the General Assembly for the North Island in 1866. He became involved in encouraging Scottish ministers to come to New Zealand to preach. In 1870 he returned to Britain; in Britain his wife died. Bruce convinced a dozen Scottish ministers to travel to New Zealand and he returned to Auckland in 1872. Upon his return Bruce became clerk of assembly, a position he held for a decade. He was general agent of the assembly in 1877 after he ceased parish responsibility of that year. Following the end of his term as general agent in 1881 Bruce had little involvement in the church and focused primarily on journalism.

In 1872 he founded the New Zealand Presbyterian Magazine. From 1891 he was lead writer for The New Zealand Herald and an editor for the New Zealand Times. Bruce held 375 acres (152 ha) of land in Hobsonville, although he was absentee. A wharf constructed on Bruce's land was known by his name and the area today is known as Bruce's Point.

Bruce was a supporter of the union of the Presbyterian church.

In 1889 he moved to New South Wales. He represented Crow's Nest Parish in Sydney from 1891 to 1911, after receiving a DDiv from the University of St Andrews. He was Moderator of the General Assembly for the Presbyterian Church of New South Wales in 1897/98 and Moderator for the Presbyterian Church of Australia 1903/04.

He died on 15 December 1911 at Killara, New South Wales.

== Family ==
His younger brother was the churchman and theologian Alexander Balmain Bruce.

In Auckland on 18 October 1859 Bruce married Mary Alexander Sinclair, daughter of John Sinclair, of Glasgow, and niece of Andrew Sinclair, second Colonial Secretary of New Zealand. She died in Scotland in 1870. They had three sons and four daughters. Their eldest daughter, Agnes ("Essie") married the physician and writer Sir H. E. B. Bruce-Porter; third daughter, Jessie Sinclair Bruce, married the politician, social reformer and medical practitioner Richard Arthur. The youngest daughter, Mary Alexander Sinclair Bruce (d. 1954), married Frederick Smythe Willis, J.P., sometime mayor of Willoughby, New South Wales and a founder member (and first hon. treasurer) of the Corporation of Accountants of Australia.
