= Bruce Bruce-Porter =

British physician and writer

Sir Bruce Bruce-Porter
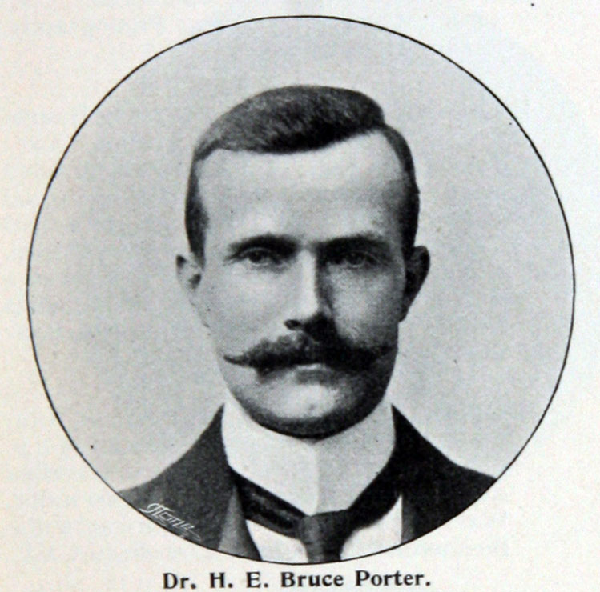
- Born: 5 February 1869; Woolwich
- Died: 15 October 1948 (aged 79); Somerset
- Occupations: Physician, writer

Sir Harry Edwin Bruce Bruce-Porter (5 February 1869 – 15 October 1948) K.B.E., C.M.G., M.D. was a British physician and writer.

== Early life and education ==
Harry Edwin Bruce Porter (later Bruce-Porter) was born at Woolwich on 5 February 1869, third son of Captain Joseph Porter (d. 1905), of the Royal Artillery. He was educated at the London Hospital and qualified in 1892. Bruce-Porter won numerous scholarships including the Anatomy-Physiology Scholarship (1889-1890) and Practical Anatomy Scholarship (1891-1892) at London Hospital Medical College. He also won the Duckworth Nelson Scholarship in Practical Medicine and Surgery (1892-1893), a Scholarship in Clinical Medicine (1892-1893) and Hon. Mention Military Medicine and Clinical Medicine and Surgery from Netley Hospital in 1898.

== Career ==
Bruce-Porter joined the Army Medical Staff and was promoted to surgeon-captain. After resigning, he started his own private medical practice in the West End of London. During WWI he was recalled to service and promoted to manage the third London General Hospital where he was the head of a team of London consultants. He went to Mesopotamia and was in command of No. 40 British General Hospital and was awarded the C.M.G in 1917. He also worked as a physician to King Edward VII's Hospital for Officers. In 1919 then a colonel, he was honoured for his services with the K.B.E. Bruce-Porter was a Fellow of the Institute of Public Health, a member of the Council of the Imperial Service College Trust, a vice-president of the Shaftesbury Society and Ragged School Union and a Knight of Grace of the Order of St. John of Jerusalem.

In his later years he became associated with Sir William Arbuthnot Lane and was a founding member of the New Health Society. Similar to Lane he promoted dietary reform ideas and was a leading activist for The Sunlight League. Bruce-Porter promoted an ovo-lacto vegetarian diet. He argued against meat eaters and strict vegetarians. He is quoted as saying that the "best all-round diet is one made up of wholemeal bread, butter, milk, eggs, vegetables, fruit and cheese". He was an advocate of fasting and opened a fasting centre at Preston Deanery Hall, Northampton.

Bruce-Porter died on 15 October 1948 in Somerset.

== Personal life ==
In 1896, Bruce-Porter married Agnes, known as "Essie" (1860-1937), daughter of Presbyterian minister David Bruce and widow of J. H. Honeyman, MD, of Auckland, New Zealand. They lived at New House Farm, Chobham, and Little St Anne's, Englefield Green, Surrey, and at 6, Grosvenor Street, Mayfair, London. Their twin daughters, Essie Isabel Bruce Bruce-Porter and Jessie Gladys Bruce Bruce-Porter, were born in 1897. Essie married in 1931 Geoffrey Archibald Clarkson, OBE, deputy superintendent of navy examinations for the Admiralty and dean of the Royal Naval College, Greenwich and Royal Naval Engineering College, Keyham, and had three sons , Peter Clarkson, CA (who settled in Toronto, Canada), Alan Clarkson, Archdeacon of Winchester from 1984 to 1999) and Robert Clarkson; Jessie married in 1923 Henry Douglas Bessemer, of Bench House, Lyndhurst, Hampshire, a chartered accountant and amateur entomologist and great-grandson of Sir Henry Bessemer, who developed the Bessemer process for manufacturing steel.

== Selected publications ==
- Preventable Disease in the Home (1921)
- Periodical Examination for Assurance Companies. In William Arbuthnot Lane. Blazing the Health Trail (1929)
- The Foundations of Health (1939)
- The Hygiene of Life and Safer Motherhood (with William Arbuthnot Lane, 1934)

== See also ==
- List of honorary medical staff at King Edward VII's Hospital for Officers
