= Mary Sutherland (forester) =

New Zealand forester and botanist (1893-1955)

- Born: 4 May 1893; London, England
- Died: March 11, 1955 (aged 61); Wellington, New Zealand
- Citizenship: New Zealander
- Education: University College of North Wales, Bangor
- Scientific career
- Fields: Forestry

Mary Sutherland (4 May 1893 – 11 March 1955) was a New Zealand forester and botanist. She was born in London, England in 1893.

== Biography ==
=== Early life ===
Sutherland was born in London on 4 May 1893 to Helen (Nellie) Miller Sutherland, a teacher, and her husband, David Sutherland, a medical wine manufacturer. She was the fourth sister of five, including Catherine (Kate), Helen (Nell), Margret (Daisy), and Anne (Nancy).

=== Education ===
Sutherland was educated at the City of London School for Girls and the University College of North Wales, Bangor, where she started an Applied Science in Agriculture course, but finished with a Bachelor of Science degree in Forestry in 1916. She was the first woman in both the United Kingdom and the British Empire to complete a Bachelor of Science in forestry, and indeed the first woman forestry graduate in the world.

=== Career ===
During the First World War she served in the Women's National Land Army in Britain, at Crown Woods in the Forest of Dean, Gloucestershire. Later she was forewoman forester in estates in Renfrewshire and Inverness-shire, Scotland. She also served as an assistant experimental officer with the British Forestry Commission. In 1922, many skilled foresters, including Mary Sutherland, lost their positions. This was as a result of reductions in expenditure by the British Forestry Commission brought about by recommendations from Sir Eric Geddes's Committee on National Expenditure, which included suspending afforestation. For the next year, despite her experience in forestry, she was unable to secure another job in the United Kingdom, as priority was given to returning World War I servicemen.

In New Zealand a State Forest Service had been established in 1921. This Service was under the direction of the Canadian-trained forester Leon MacIntosh Ellis. Sutherland was attracted to New Zealand because she felt it offered forestry conditions similar to those in the United Kingdom. She also had a family connection to New Zealand, as her sister Kate was now living there. Sutherland emigrated to New Zealand in 1923 on the SS Paparoa when she was 30 years old. She was offered a temporary position at the New Zealand State Forest Service and started work in late 1923 in Wellington.

Sutherland attended a three-week introductory course for rangers of the New Zealand Forest Service at Whakarewarewa. New Zealand's State Forest Service had an entirely male workforce at this time, and she encountered conservatism and male prejudice in the workplace. During this course, Sutherland was required to stay at the Geyer Hotel instead of camp with the other (male) rangers. This attitude to women rangers resulted in a financial disincentive for the Forest Service to send Sutherland into the field. However, despite it she managed to obtain a permanent appointment in 1925 with the Forest Service. She was employed at the Wellington and Rotorua offices to do investigative and experimental work in silviculture.

She travelled extensively throughout New Zealand for her job, visiting experimental nurseries and plantations around the country, and writing up her findings in reports, articles and papers. She also gave public lectures about trees and forestry, and was heavily involved in a forestry in schools programme.

In 1924 she had become a member of the Empire Forestry Association and was appointed a Fellow of the Society of Foresters of Great Britain in 1928. The New Zealand Institute of Foresters (NZIF), established in 1927, lists Sutherland among its founding members. She supported the institute's aims and activities, serving as a councillor in 1935 and as vice-president in 1940-41. Her design of a sprig of fruiting rimu was voted into the NZIF official seal, which is still used today.

In 1929 she undertook research to determine microscopic characters that could be used to identify the many exotic conifer species that had been brought to New Zealand over the previous 80 years for wood, paper, turpentine and resin. She published the results in a paper entitled, "A microscopical study of the structure of the leaves of the genus Pinus," which was published in the Transactions and Proceedings of the New Zealand Institute in 1933.

During the years 1933 to 1936 New Zealand was suffering an economic depression which resulted in the Forest Service making severe cutbacks. These retrenchments included Sutherland's specialty area of research. In 1933, when she was 40 years old, Sutherland was laid off, but continued to serve on the Council of the New Zealand Forestry League. That same year she started working at the Dominion Museum in Wellington.

Although the director of the museum, Walter Oliver, described her position as "librarian and part-time botanical assistant", her job status was classified as clerical. Nevertheless she took on the many roles of a botanist, making field collections of over 900 specimens for the herbarium, helping manage the growing collections, preparing museum exhibits, assisting with the move to the new museum at Buckle St, corresponding with and assisting New Zealand and overseas botanists, and running an international herbarium specimen exchange programme. She presented a paper at the Pacific Science Congress in 1933.

Although some sources suggest in 1937 Sutherland returned to the Forest Service as a botanist, museum archives show she was on sick leave from 1937-1940. She continued to work at the museum once she returned from sick leave, but during the war years she was appointed assistant supervisor of a women's accommodation hostel in Woburn, in the Hutt Valley, until 1946.

In 1946 she was seconded to the Department of Agriculture as a farm forestry officer. While in this new position she started her pioneering work in agricultural forestry. She was in charge the layout of plantations at the Department's Winchmore Irrigation Research Station and Invermay Agricultural Research Station. She also helped run the Department's farm schools, which inlcluded travelling to various towns in Northland with other colleagues with exhibits.

Between 1947 and 1949 she published a significant series of articles in the New Zealand Journal of Agriculture on the advantages to be gained when planting trees on farms. These articles formed the basis for the 1951 Department of Agriculture bulletin on homestead shelter planting. In 1950 she contributed a chapter, Native vegetation, to the Department of Agriculture publication Farming in New Zealand.

Sutherland was active in the Wellington Philosophical Society and the New Zealand Federation of University Women.

=== Death ===
Sutherland's career was cut short when ill heath suffered during field-work in Central Otago during 1954 led to her death. Sutherland died in Wellington on March 11, 1955.

== Legacy ==
Sutherland left a bequest of £100 to the New Zealand Institute of Foresters (NZIF) for the establishment of "a fund for overseas study, or [to] be used to further the aims of the institute". Her contribution to forestry continues to be commemorated each year with the presentation of the Mary Sutherland Award granted to a student member of the NZIF, which as of 2011 is called the Mary Sutherland Scholarship and is administered by the NZIF Foundation. The Mary Sutherland Award (sometimes called the Mary Sutherland Prize) at Bangor University, awarded to the best female forestry graduate from Bangor University. In 2017, Sutherland was selected as one of the Royal Society Te Apārangi's "150 women in 150 words", celebrating the contributions of women to knowledge in New Zealand.
