= St Andrew's First Presbyterian Church =

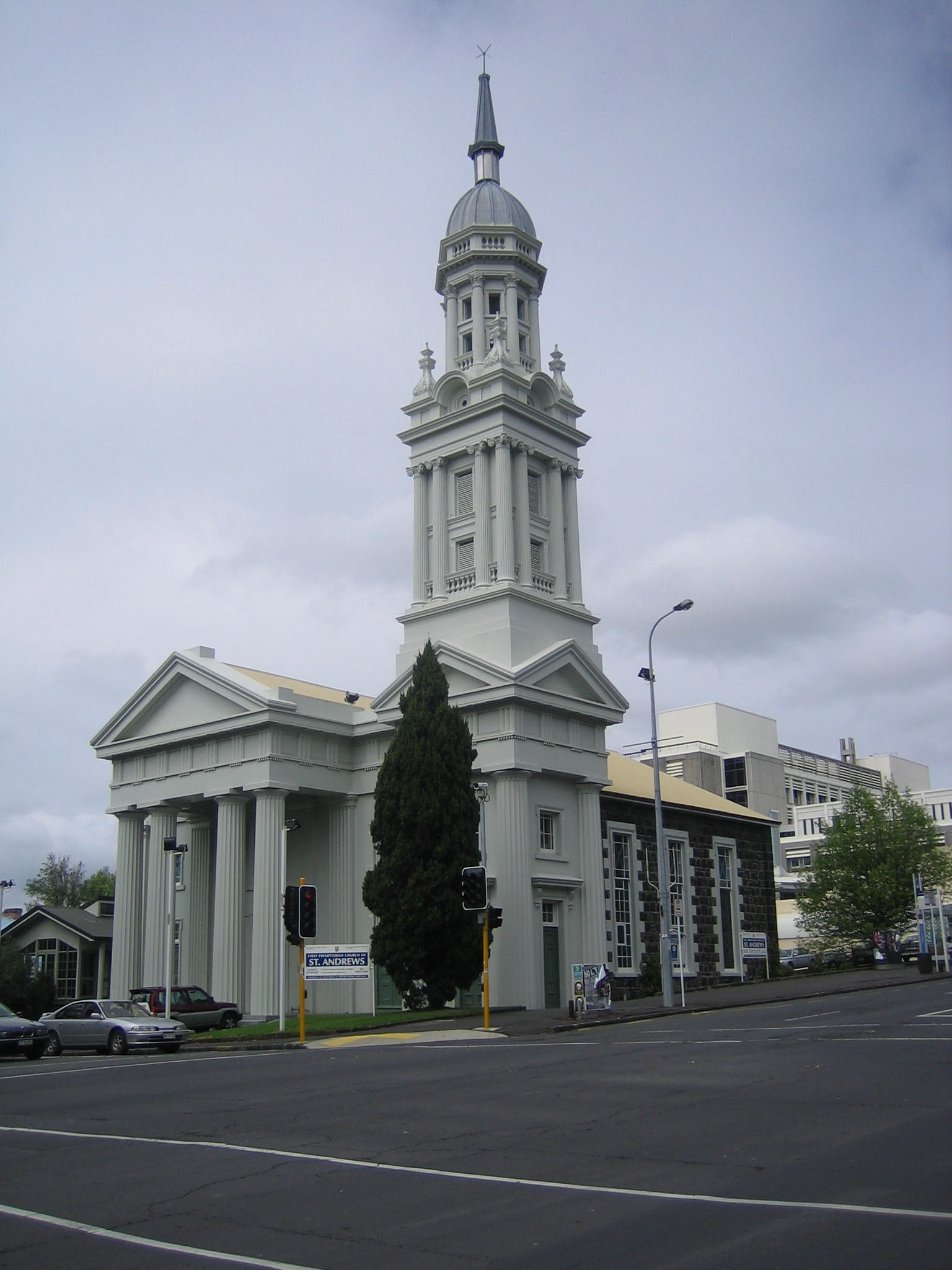
- St Andrew's First Presbyterian Church
- 36.85060°S 174.77241°E
- Location: Corner of Symonds Street and Alten Road, Auckland city centre
- Country: New Zealand
- Denomination: Presbyterian
- Website: www.standrewschurch.org.nz

Architecture
- Architect(s): Walter Robertson; Matthew Henderson (portico and tower)
- Style: Neoclassical
- Years built: 1850

Heritage New Zealand – Category 1
- Designated: 23 June 1983

St Andrew's First Presbyterian Church is a Neoclassical Presbyterian church constructed in 1850 in the Auckland city centre, and is the oldest surviving church in the central city. It is registered as a Category I heritage building by Heritage New Zealand.

== History ==
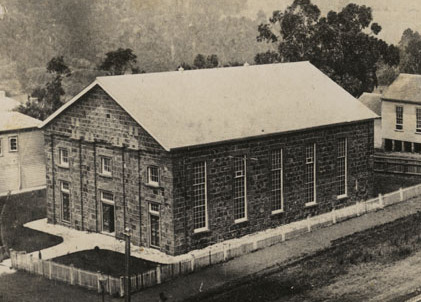
The original church, prior to the addition of the Greek Revival portico and tower, added in 1882

In May 1847, a committee was established to find a Presbyterian minister for the city of Auckland, and to construct a suitable church. Construction began on the building in December 1847, but due to problems with cost the construction was slow and scaled back. The main church building was completed in 1850, making St Andrew's the oldest surviving church in the city centre. The church building was constructed from locally sourced basalt and Mahurangi mudstone, from a plan by architect Walter Robertson. Scottish minister David Bruce arrived in 1853, and by 1860 the name St Andrews was adopted. Governor George Grey and his family attended the church, as well as many other influential members of Auckland society.

St Andrew's was seen as the mother church for Presbyterianism in the Auckland Province, and to express this, the church building was expanded in the 1880s, by the addition of a Greek Revival portico and tower, completed in 1882. A portico and tower were features of the original buildings plans, however the additions did not use Robertson's original designs, instead adopted a new design by Matthew Henderson. In contrast to many other Presbyterian congregations who did not use musical instruments, an organ was also erected inside the church.

The church suffered from falling patronage in the 1920s and 1930s due to the growth and suburbanisation of Auckland, to the point where the church faced closure in the 1930s. In 1957, the church was refurbished.

In the mid-1980s, a service began for the Indonesian community in Auckland. Refurbishment work on the church began in April 2001, which included the removal of the louvres with stained glass.

== See also ==
- All Saints' Church, Howick completed in November 1847.
