= Leon MacIntosh Ellis =

New Zealand forestry administrator and consultant

Leon MacIntosh Ellis (17 July 1887 – 25 November 1941) was a New Zealand forestry administrator and consultant. He was born in Meaford, Ontario, Canada on 17 July 1887.

Ellis oversaw the creation of the New Zealand Forestry Service and the employment of specialists to assist the Service in its aims. One of the specialists hired by the New Zealand Forestry Service was Mary Sutherland a notable New Zealand forester and botanist.
