= Lake Harihari =

- Lake Harihari is in the Waikato region of the North Island
- Location: Waitomo District, Waikato region, North Island
- Coordinates: 38°12′35″S 174°43′23″E
- Lake type: oligomesotrophic lake
- Primary outflows: seepage
- Catchment area: 134 ha (330 acres)
- Basin countries: New Zealand
- Surface area: 18.39 ha (45.4 acres)
- Max. depth: 9 m (30 ft)
- Surface elevation: 20 m (66 ft)

Lake Harihari is a dune-dammed lake 10 km south of Kawhia in the Waikato region of New Zealand. Its water quality is the best amongst the Waikato dune lakes. It is ranked eighth in importance in the region. Its quality has been attributed to its remoteness.

== Geology ==
The lake is dammed by the dunes, though in wet weather a stream flows from it. Under the dunes a hard strong friable greywacke sandstone forms most of the coastline from Albatross Point to Awakino. It is part of the Late Triassic (Oretian-Otapirian) rocks of the Newcastle Group.

The lake bed belongs to Taharoa Lakes Trust and the land around it is private. Waikato Biodiversity Forum said, "We know of only one other shallow lake in the region that is comparable in terms of water quality." It is ranked eighth in regional importance as a Category Two Lake – high condition, high vulnerability.

== Biota ==
Lake Harihari has the best quality of all the Waikato dune lakes with oligomesotrophic water quality. Works such as a trial fish passage structure (installed in 2009), fencing a 37 to 80m buffer (started in 2005), and about 10,000 new plants, selected to withstand the harsh coastal winds and dry summers, aim to improve the lake's value. Biota recorded include dabchicks, shells, a large freshwater mussel population, freshwater sponges (common), native snails, native fish, the common bully and New Zealand smelt.

The health of the lake is indicated by the variety of zooplankton in it - rotifers (Anuraeopsis fissa, Synchaeta grandis, S. longipes, Ascomorpha ovalis, Brachionus angularis, B. caliciflorus, Keratella cochlearis, K. tecta, Polyarthra dolichoptera, Trichocerca similis), Bosmina meridionalis, Calamoecia lucasi, Mesocyclops leuckarti, nauplii. Harihari has the lowest non-native zooplankton of all Waikato lakes, though alligator weed control was carried out in 2018. There are also other weed species such as willow, pampas, kikuyu and Canadian pondweed.

== History ==
The archaeology map shows a dozen sites around and near the lake.

== See also ==
- List of lakes in New Zealand
