= Alan Clarkson (priest) =

English priest (1934–2022)

Alan Geoffrey Clarkson (14 February 1934 – 8 November 2022) was Archdeacon of Winchester from 1984 to 1999.

== Early life and education ==
The second son of Geoffrey Archibald Clarkson, OBE, deputy superintendent of navy examinations for the Admiralty and dean of the Royal Naval College, Greenwich and Royal Naval Engineering College, Keyham, and his wife Essie Isabel Bruce, daughter of the physician and writer H. E. B. Bruce-Porter, Clarkson was educated at Sherborne School; Christ's College, Cambridge (B.A. 1957, M.A. 1961); and Wycliffe Hall, Oxford.

== Career ==
After National Service in the Royal Artillery he was ordained in 1960. After curacies in Penn, Wolverhampton, Oswestry and Wrington he held incumbencies at Chewton Mendip, Glastonbury and Burley, Ringwood. He was an Honorary Canon at Winchester Cathedral from 1984 to 1999.

He died in 2022, aged 88.
