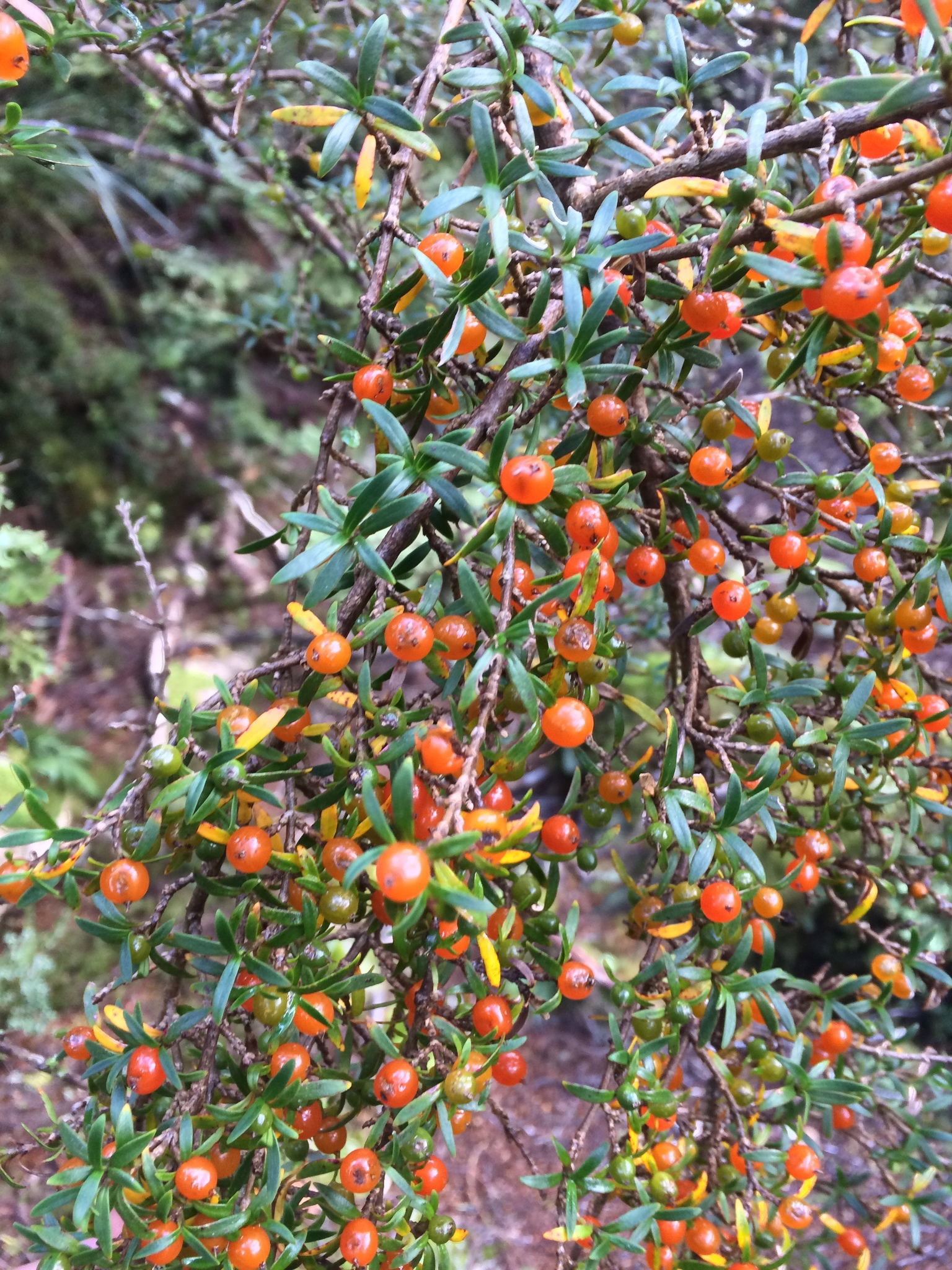
- Coprosma pseudocuneata in Fiordland National Park

Conservation status
- Not Threatened (NZ TCS)

Scientific classification
- Kingdom: Plantae
- Clade: Embryophytes
- Clade: Tracheophytes
- Clade: Angiosperms
- Clade: Eudicots
- Clade: Asterids
- Order: Gentianales
- Family: Rubiaceae
- Genus: Coprosma
- Species: C. pseudocuneata

Binomial name
- Coprosma pseudocuneata W.R.B.Oliv. ex Garn.-Jones & Elder

= Coprosma pseudocuneata =

Species of flowering plant

Coprosma pseudocuneata is a species of plant that is endemic to New Zealand.

== Description ==
A small, erect shrub. The leaves grow opposite each other, and are small, green, with a pointed tip. There is a small, hairy sheath around the base of the leaves. The singular flowers are yellow. The fruits are around 6mm long, and orange-red, scarlet, or blueish and yellow.

The form may differ based on where it is found, both by habitat and distribution.

== Distribution and habitat ==
Coprosma pseudocuneata is found in alpine environments on both the North Island and South Island. On Mount Taranaki, it is found from 1,100 to 1,400 m (3,600 to 4,600 ft) above sea level. It has been noted as having thicker, broader leaves there. The northern limits are Mount Hikurangi and Maungapohatu.

The type locality is from Mount Holdsworth.

Coprosma pseudocuneata can live in a variety of habitats, from lowland bog and shrubland to subalpine environments.

== Ecology ==
In the South Island, Coprosma pseudocuneata is often associated with Nothofagus solandri, creating a variation of subalpine forest. These forests are generally species-poor.

== Etymology ==
The name implies that pseudocuneata is similar to Coprosma cuneata.

== Taxonomy ==
The species was formally described for the first time in 1996. The Latin description was translated by Elizabeth Edgar.

The relation to Coprosma solandri may need further research.
