= St Luke's Church, Christchurch =

St Luke's Church
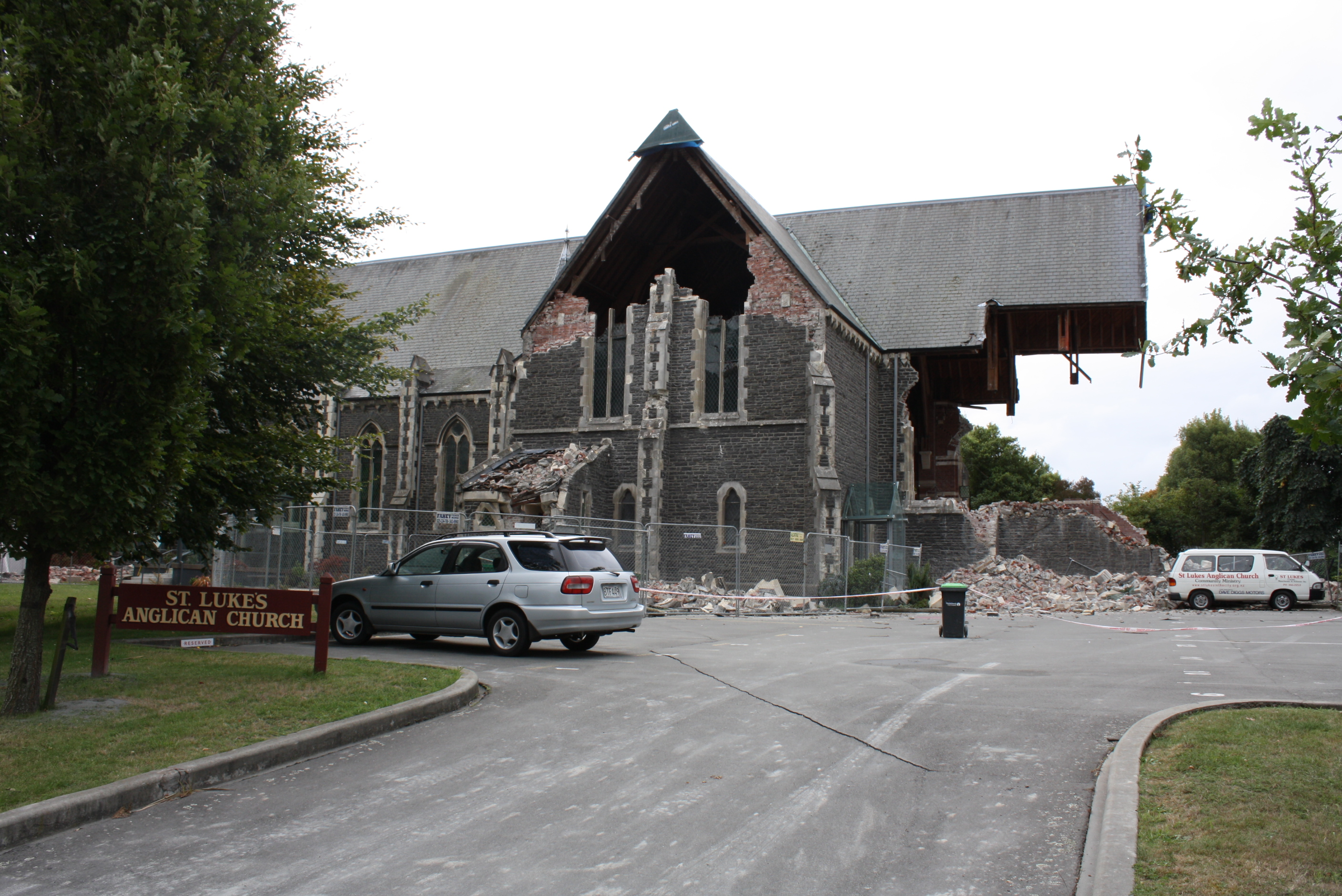
- St Luke's Church three days after the 2011 Christchurch earthquake
- St Luke's Church
- 43.5261°S 172.6401°E
- Location: Corner of Kilmore and Manchester Streets, Christchurch
- Country: New Zealand
- Previous denomination: Anglican
- Website: stlukesinthecity.org.nz

History
- Status: Church (former)
- Founded: 3 September 1908
- Founder: Bishop Churchill Julius
- Consecrated: 17 October 1909
- Events: 2011 Christchurch earthquake

Architecture
- Functional status: Demolished
- Heritage designation: Category II
- Architect: Cyril Mountfort
- Architectural type: Church (former)
- Style: Gothic Revival
- Construction cost: NZ£9,800
- Closed: February 2011
- Demolished: July 2011

St Luke's Church was an Anglican church located in Christchurch, New Zealand. The former church was built on one of the five sites set aside in the central city in the original survey of Christchurch for the Anglican church and the building was registered as a Category II historic place with the New Zealand Historic Places Trust. Following sustained damage caused by the February 2011 Christchurch earthquake, the building was demolished in July 2011.

== History ==
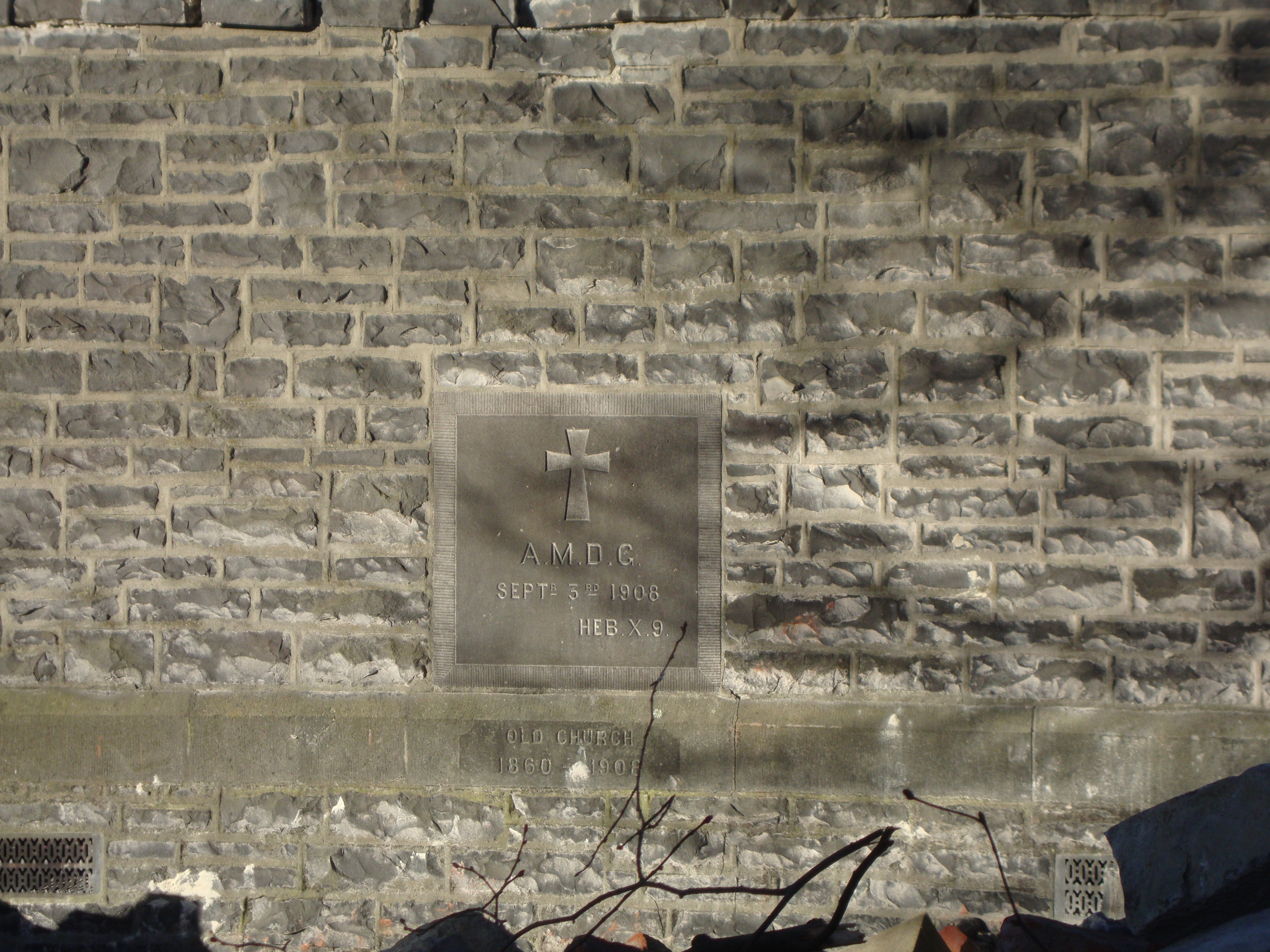
Foundation stone of St Luke's Church

The site bounded by Manchester, Lichfield and Peterborough Streets was one of five sites set aside by the Canterbury Association in the original survey of Christchurch, which was carried out during 1850. A church, the Chapel of Ease, was built on the site between 1858 and 1860. After St Michael and All Angels, it was the second Anglican church in Christchurch. The result was described as "ugly and barn-like". This first church had a frontage onto Peterborough Street, and it was extended in 1871 based on a design by Benjamin Mountfort. The Chapel of Ease was demolished in 1908.

St Luke's was designed by Cyril Mountfort, the son of Benjamin Mountfort, in Gothic Revival style. St Luke's design is similar to two churches designed by Mountfort Senior in the 1880s; The Church of the Good Shepherd in Phillipstown (demolished in 2011) and St John's Cathedral in Napier (destroyed in the 1931 Hawke's Bay earthquake). The foundation stone was laid by Bishop Julius on 3 September 1908.

Construction took 13 months and the contract value was NZ£9,800. The church was consecrated on 17 October 1909 by Bishop Julius, and the sermon read by Archdeacon Averill.

Of the series of eight stamps issued by New Zealand Post for Christmas 1995, the four highest denominations ($0.80 to $1.80) depicted scenes from the stained glass windows of St Luke's.

The church was badly damaged in the February 2011 Christchurch earthquake, deconsecrated, and demolished the following July. The church can be seen in Gerard Symth's video chronicle of the earthquakes, When A City Falls.

The congregation is still meeting, despite the earthquake damage, and counselling services continue. Services are currently held in the Mary Potter Community Centre, and at the central-city Knox presbyterian church, as well as weekday morning prayer on the St Luke's site but the rebuilding of a church on the site is uncertain.

== Heritage registration ==
The church was registered by the New Zealand Historic Places Trust as a Category II heritage building with registration number 3353. The adjacent St Luke's Vicarage was registered on 15 February 1990 as a Category I heritage building with registration number 3132 and remains standing, under restoration as a residential dwelling.
