= Edith Mellish =

New Zealand Anglican deaconess and nun

Edith Mary Mellish (10 March 1861 – 25 May 1922) was a New Zealand Anglican deaconess and nun. She was born in Pailles, Mauritius on 10 March 1861. Her father, Edward Mellish, was a banker and businessman, and she grew up in Mauritius, England, and Hong Kong. Her mother, Ellen Borrowes, died while she was a baby, and her father remarried twice. Mellish joined the St Andrew's Deaconess Community in London and was ordained deaconess in 1891 just after her 30th birthday; at the time, that was the minimum age for ordination.

The second Anglican bishop of Christchurch, Churchill Julius, sent a request to London for a deaconess to be sent who could establish a religious community in Christchurch. Frederick Temple, the bishop of London, recommended Mellish to him. Bishop Julius, who travelled to London with his wife and daughters in 1893 for health reasons, met Mellish and they returned to New Zealand on the Ruahine; they arrived in Auckland on 14 August 1893, and Mellish arrived in Lyttelton (Christchurch's port) on 22 August.

Mellish founded the Community of the Sisters of Bethany, and in 1895, the sisters moved to Barbadoes Street. In 1912, the community was renamed to avoid confusion with another community, and they were from then known as the Community of the Sacred Name. Sister Edith, from 1911 known as Mother Edith, was ill from 1914. She died in Christchurch on 25 May 1922. Her requiem was held at the Church of the Good Shepherd in Phillipstown, and she was buried at Linwood Cemetery.
