= Community of the Sacred Name =

Coordinates: 43.53564°S 172.64528°E

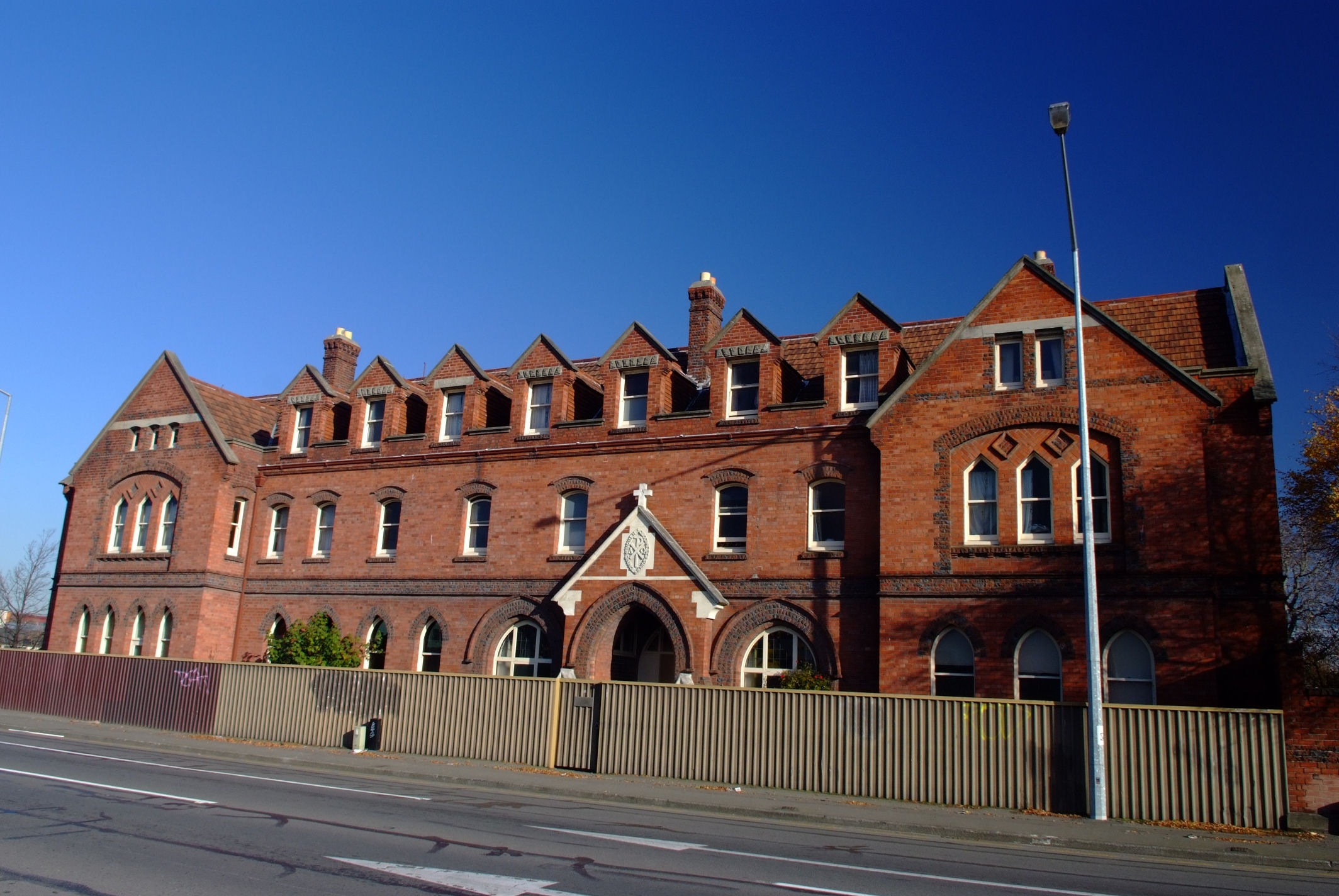
The prominent brick building by J. G. Collins was demolished after the 2011 Christchurch earthquake

The Community of the Sacred Name is a community of nuns in the Anglican Church in Aotearoa New Zealand and Polynesia. CSN Sisters currently live in Christchurch, Ashburton, Nukualofa and Suva. The former Motherhouse of the community including convent, chapel and novitiate stood in the central city of Christchurch, New Zealand.

The second Anglican bishop of Christchurch, Churchill Julius, wanted to see a community of deaconesses established in Christchurch. Edith Mellish from London was chosen and she arrived in Christchurch in August 1893. She founded the Community of the Sisters of Bethany, and in 1895, the sisters moved to Barbadoes Street.

Originally, three buildings were erected on the corner of Barbadoes and St Asaph Streets. The first two were known as Deaconess House, with the first of these a simple one-storey designed by Benjamin Mountfort; he was one of New Zealand's most eminent architects and gave Christchurch a unique architectural identity. The second building was added in 1900, running perpendicular to the first building at two storeys high. This second building was designed by Cyril Mountfort, the son of Benjamin Mountfort, and contained the chapel. The third building, fronting Barbadoes Street, was designed by John Goddard Collins of Armson, Collins and Harman and built in 1911–12. It was a prominent two-storey brick building, hiding the original buildings behind it. In 1912, the community was renamed to avoid confusion with another community, the community changed from being a community of deaconesses to a community of religious sisters, they were from then known as the Community of the Sacred Name.

The brick building was damaged in the 2011 Christchurch earthquake and later demolished. The sisters sold the remaining timber buildings to a charity called 'Home and Family'. A restoration deal was brokered by Heritage New Zealand, with the organisation itself, the Lotteries Commission, and Christchurch City Council significantly contributing to the NZ$2.9m renovation and repair costs.

The buildings are registered by Heritage New Zealand as a Category I item, with registration number 4387 registered on 15 February 1990.
