= Cambridge movement =

Cambridge Movement may refer to:

- Cambridge movement (philosophy), a school of thought closely related to the Oxford Movement
- Cambridge movement (civil rights), a social and political movement in Cambridge, Maryland
