= Holy Trinity Avonside =

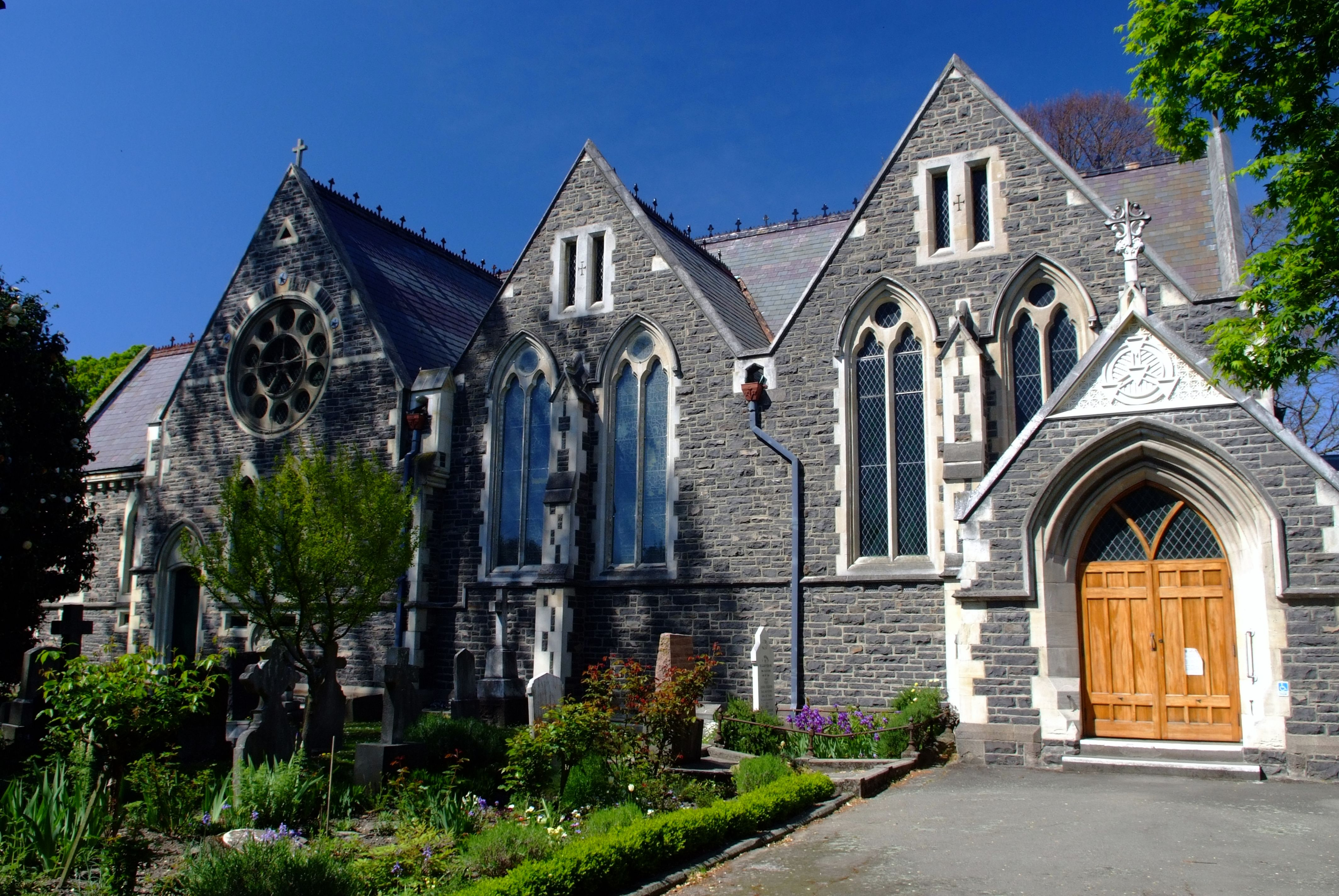
- Holy Trinity Avonside in 2008, prior to its 2011 demolition
- Holy Trinity Avonside
- 43.5266°S 172.6586°E
- Location: Linwood, Christchurch
- Country: New Zealand
- Previous denomination: Anglican
- Website: holytrinityavonside.nz

History
- Status: Church (former)
- Consecrated: 1857
- Events: 2011 Christchurch earthquake

Architecture
- Functional status: Demolished
- Heritage designation: Category I
- Designated: 16 November 1989
- Architectural type: Gothic Revival style
- Closed: February 2011
- Demolished: September 2011

Holy Trinity Avonside was a heritage-listed Anglican church located in the Avonside Parish, Christchurch, New Zealand. It was registered as a "Historic Place – Category I" by the New Zealand Historic Places Trust. The church building was "damaged beyond the point of repair" in the February 2011 Christchurch earthquake and was demolished the following September.

== History ==
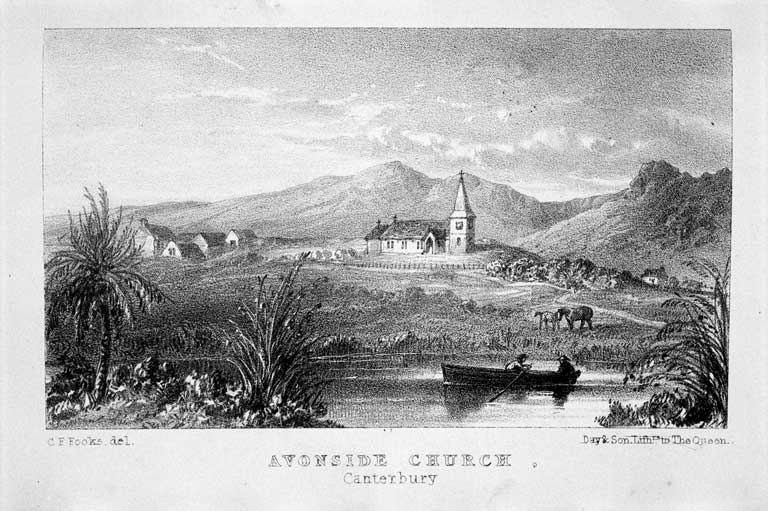
The original Avonside Church in ca 1857

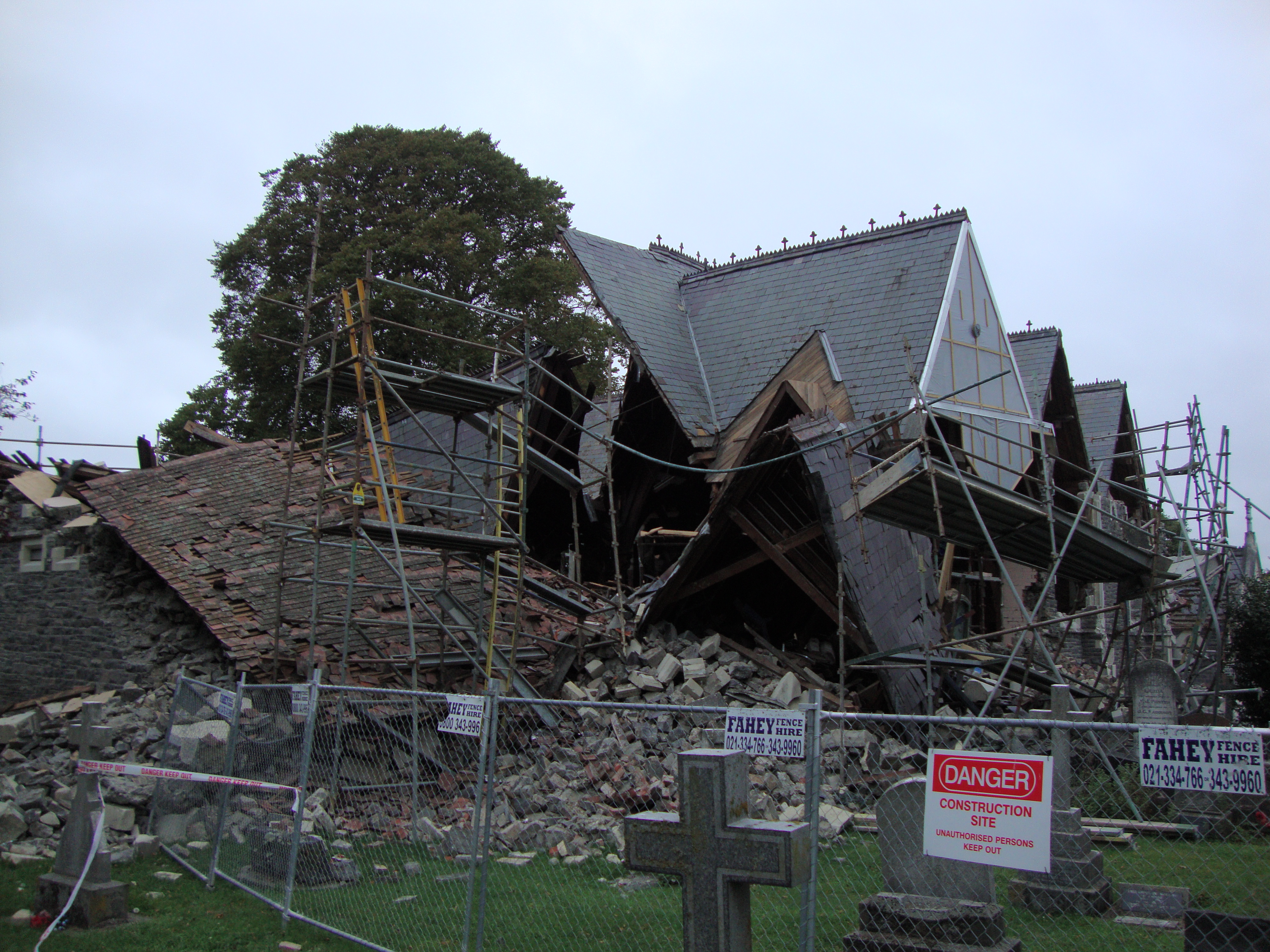
The 1876 part of the church, designed by Mountfort, collapsed while repairs were under way

The Parish of the Most Holy Trinity Avonside was established in 1855, with the first service held in the Rev. Charles Mackie's home "Stricklands". The first service was held in a church building designed by Charles Edward Fooks and made of cob at Christmas Day 1855, but the church was only consecrated on 24 February 1857; it was the first Anglican church in Canterbury consecrated by Bishop Harper. The land for the church had been provided by John and Elizabeth Stace, who had arrived in Lyttelton on the Nugent in 1851. Architect Benjamin Mountfort, a parishioner, designed additions to the church including a bell tower and timber vestry in 1869. Around 1873, further Mountfort-designed additions included a stone chancel and transepts. In 1905 the original cob building was replaced by a stone nave designed by Mountfort's son Cyril Mountfort. In 1953–1954 the west end of the church was extended, removing the remaining pre-1870s part of the building.

The church received damage in the 2010 Canterbury earthquake. Repairs were under way when the February 2011 Christchurch earthquake struck, when the church building suffered major damage including collapse of the chancel and most of the transepts. The church was "damaged beyond the point of repair". Workers repairing damage on the inside of the 1876 Mountfort-designed part of the church were having lunch outside when this part of the building collapsed. The church was demolished in September 2011 amidst much controversy. Heritage advocates claimed that the church was of higher importance than ChristChurch Cathedral and more should have been done to try and save it, or it should have at least been dismantled by hand to save important architectural features like the ceilings, but instead diggers smashed everything up. Bishop Victoria Matthews defended the demolition, stating that her "priority has to be humans and the safety of the community. It wasn't the time to take chances." A time capsule containing the words of the consecration was recovered from underneath the nave.

== Graveyard ==
The church graveyard is the burial place of some prominent Cantabrians including:

- Joseph Brittan (1805–1867), surgeon, newspaper editor, and provincial councillor
- James Arthur Flesher (1865–1930), Mayor of Christchurch
- Julius von Haast (1822–1887), explorer and geologist
- Cyril Mountfort (1852–1920), architect
- Benjamin Mountfort (1825–1898), architect, father of Cyril
- William Rolleston (1831–1903), Superintendent of Canterbury Province
- George Warren Russell (1854–1937), Minister of Health during the 1918 flu pandemic

There is one Commonwealth war grave, of a New Zealand soldier of World War I.

== Heritage listing ==
On 16 November 1989, the church was registered by the New Zealand Historic Places Trust as a Category I historic place, with the registration number being 3113. Among Mountfort's churches, it is significant as it is his first Anglican stone church. The graveyard is also significant for the number of important people buried there. The parish was one of the first to be established in Christchurch.
