= Phillipstown School =

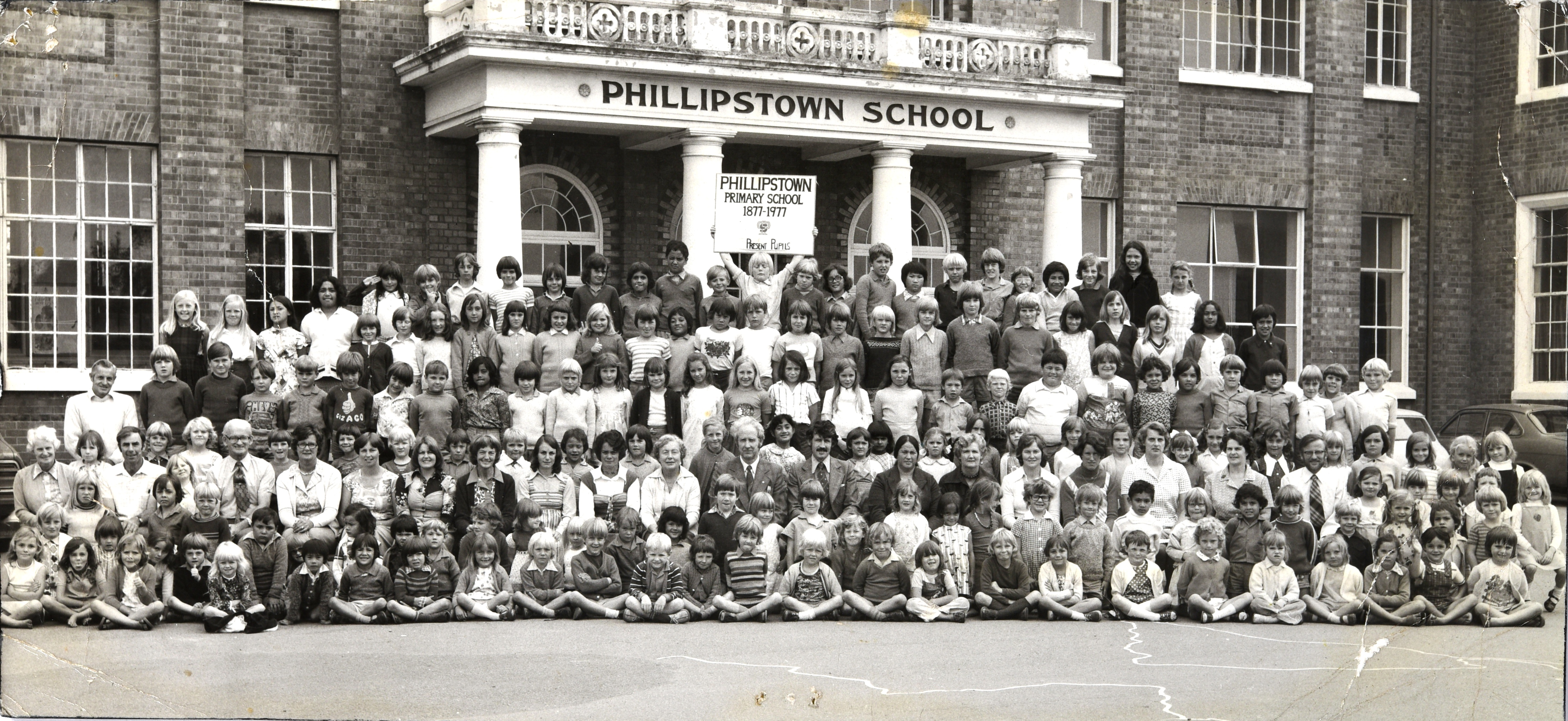
- The original school building at the centenary in 1977 just before it was demolished

Location
- 39 Nursery Road; Phillipstown; Christchurch 8011; New Zealand; 43.5376°S 172.6563°E

Information
- Funding type: State
- Ministry of Education Institution no.: 3474
- Principal: Tony Simpson
- Years offered: 1–8
- Gender: Coeducational
- Enrolment: (July 2026)
- Socio-economic decile: 1
- Website: www.phillipstown.school.nz

Phillipstown School was a state co-educational full primary school located in the Christchurch, New Zealand, suburb of Phillipstown. Founded in 1877, the school had students from Years 1 to 8 (ages 5 to 13). It closed at the end of 2014 when it was merged with Woolston School on the Woolston site.

The school had an attached technology centre, which taught "manual training" technology subjects to 1,200 Year 7 and 8 students from Phillipstown and 30 other full primary schools in Christchurch. Unlike intermediate schools and Year 7–13 secondary schools, most full primary schools in Christchurch do not have the roll numbers, staff or facilities to fully provide technology subjects to Year 7 and 8 students, so the technology centre catered for these schools. Students attended the centre for 90 minutes per week and rotated every term through six different areas of study: wood, metal, plastic, textiles, food and electronics.

Phillipstown came to national attention in 2013 when it sought a judicial review over a decision by the minister of education, Hekia Parata, to merge it with nearby Woolston School. The closure was delayed when the High Court subsequently ruled in favour of Phillipstown and overturned the minister's decision. However, ultimately, the school was closed.

The buildings have subsequently been put to use as a community hub.
