= St Saviour's Chapel =

- St Saviour's at Holy Trinity
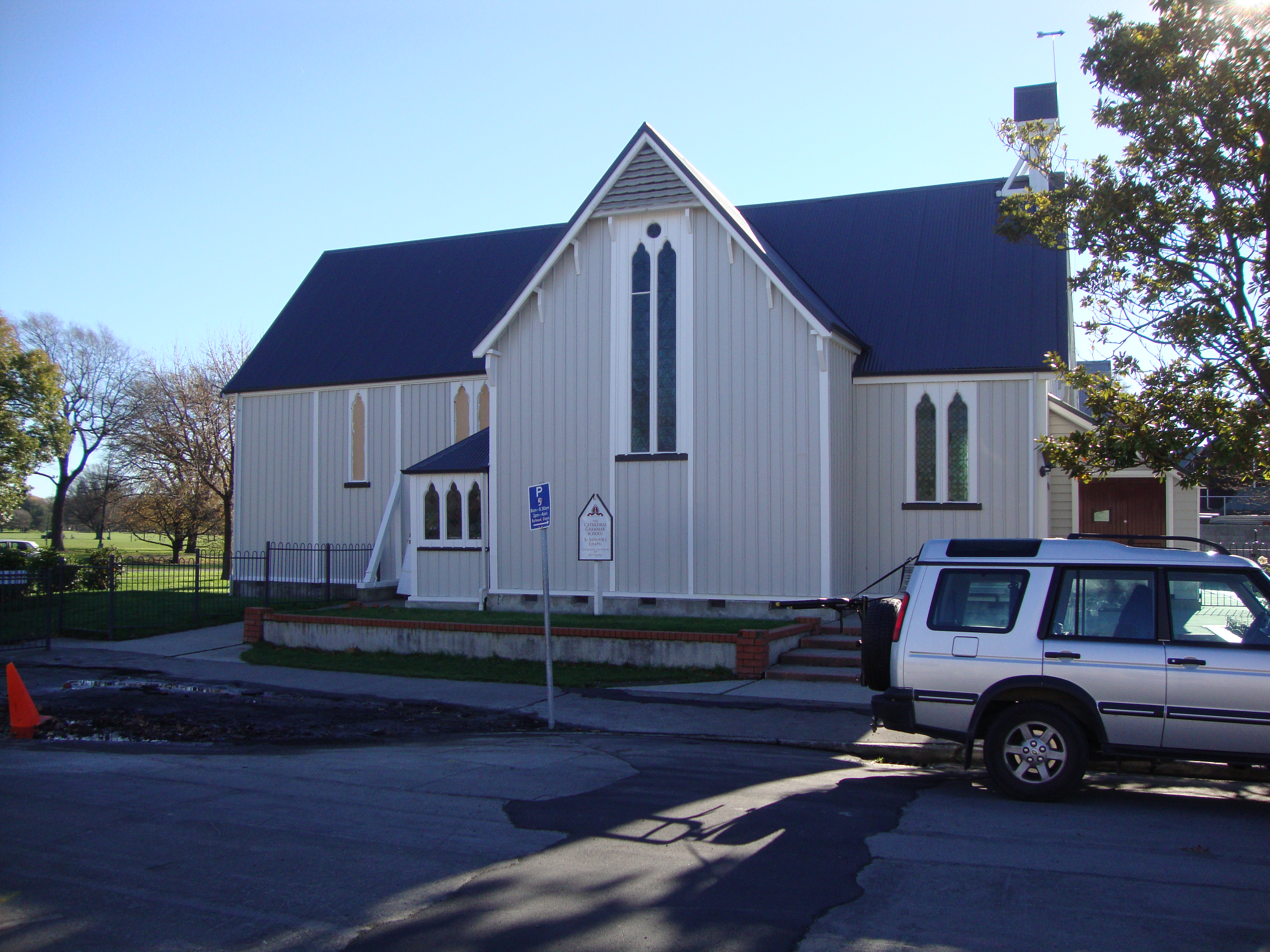
- St Saviour's Chapel at its Cathedral Grammar School site
- St Saviour's Chapel
- 43.601833°S 172.721559°E
- Location: Lyttelton
- Country: New Zealand
- Denomination: Anglican
- Website: http://lytteltonanglican.wixsite.com/

History
- Consecrated: 29 October 1885

Architecture
- Heritage designation: Category II
- Designated: 24 June 2005
- Architect: Cyril Mountfort

Administration
- Diocese: Christchurch

Clergy
- Vicar: Rev'd John McLister

St Saviour's at Holy Trinity is an Anglican church in Lyttelton, Christchurch, New Zealand. St Saviour's Chapel was relocated from West Lyttelton to Christchurch's Cathedral Grammar School in the 1970s. Following the earthquakes and the demolition of Holy Trinity Church, Lyttelton, St Saviour's was returned to Lyttelton to the site of Holy Trinity in 2013.

== History ==
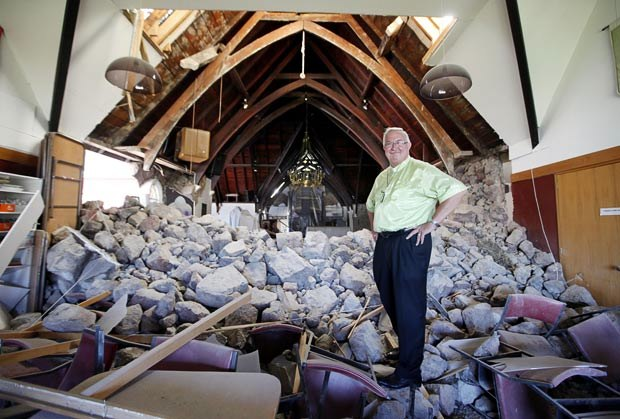
Damage inside Holy Trinity Church in Lyttelton, which was later demolished and replaced by St Saviour's Chapel

Benjamin Woolley Dudley (1805–1892) was the first vicar of Lyttelton, having arrived on the Cressy in 1850. In 1883, Dudley, by now Archdeacon of Rangiora, proposed that the parish of Lyttelton be split and a new church founded to minister both to residents of West Lyttelton and visiting seafarers. Dudley provided an endowment to assist with building and the provision of a minister. The parish of West Lyttelton was formed and a curate appointed in 1885.

Cyril Mountfort was chosen as the architect for the chapel. It is built in Early English Gothic Revival style and constructed of timber, with a steeply pitched roof and narrow lancet windows. During construction, sections of the building were transported onto the chosen site (the corner of Simeon Quay and Brittan Terrace in West Lyttelton) and bolted together. St Saviour's was consecrated on 29 October 1885 by Bishop Harper. The design allowed for three further sections to be added later, but the predicted growth of the congregation did not happen and the chapel was not extended.

Robert Falcon Scott and crew worshipped here prior to the Discovery and Terra Nova expeditions. Scott and his polar party reached the South Pole on the latter expedition but died on their return journey.

In 1964, the urban area of Lyttelton was united into one parish, and over time, St Saviour's became secondary, with the focus being on Holy Trinity Church at 17 Winchester Street. In 1975, the parishioners offered the building to the Christchurch Diocese and the decision was made to give the chapel to Cathedral Grammar School. The chapel was dismantled into its sections and transported by truck to a site on the corner of Chester Street West and Park Terrace in Christchurch Central City. The chapel was erected on the school grounds in January and February 1976. Its Lyttelton site was used for housing for the elderly. The original altar was given to the Department of Scientific and Industrial Research (DSIR) for use in the Antarctic and is now in the Chapel of the Snows at McMurdo Station.

St Saviour's Chapel itself suffered only light damage in the February 2011 Christchurch earthquake, but land damage means that it would be necessary to remove the chapel from its site so that ground remediation could be carried out. Paul Kennedy, the headmaster of Cathedral Grammar School, offered the chapel to the Christchurch Diocese, with Bishop Victoria Matthews in turn deciding that of the three applicants, the chapel be given to Lyttelton as a replacement for Holy Trinity Church, which had been demolished after the earthquakes. Christchurch City Council gave a heritage incentive grant of NZ$143k in July 2013 towards the relocation costs.

The foundation for the new church was laid on 18 August 2013 by Bishop Matthews. The St Saviour's building was cut into ten pieces, and in September 2013 moved, through Gebbies Pass, to its new home. Renamed St Saviour's at Holy Trinity, it was consecrated by Bishop Matthews on 7 June 2015. Anglicans have worshipped on the site since 1850 and St Saviour's is the third church building there. The main structure is largely St Saviour's but it has been turned around on its axis so that what was originally the sanctuary is now the nave at the west end.

The porch of Holy Trinity was added to St Saviour's and the altar and other features re-used. A notable element saved from the former church on the site is the William Butterfield-designed stained glass window in the sanctuary. The 1865 organ from Holy Trinity has been refurbished by the South Island Organ Company.

== Heritage registration ==
The church was registered by the New Zealand Historic Places Trust as a Category II heritage building on 24 June 2005 with registration number 1929. It became Category I on 1 May 2017.
