= Cathedral Grammar School =

Private full primary school in Christchurch, New Zealand

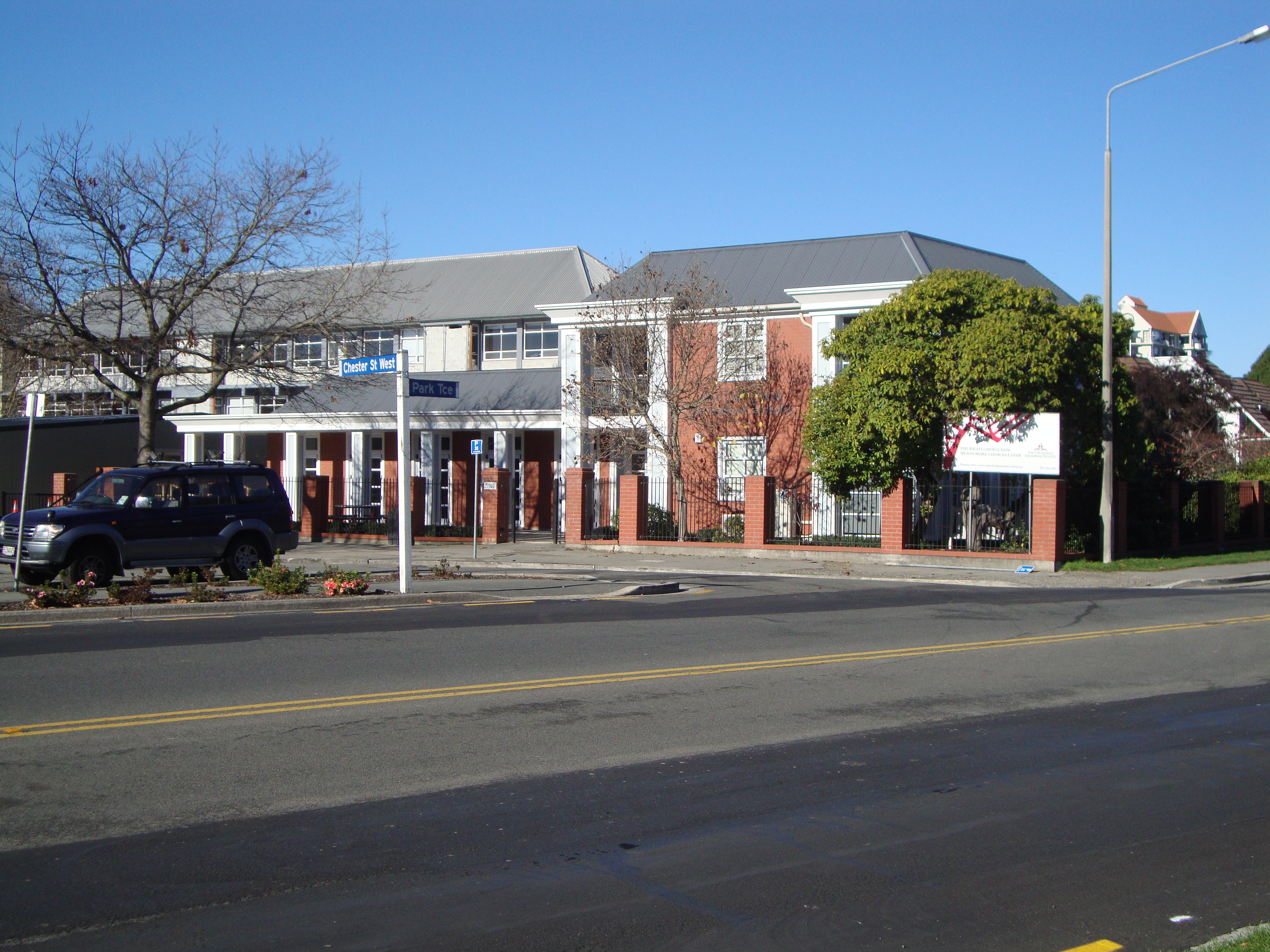
- Cathedral Grammar in May 2011, after the demolition of the Statham Building

Location
- 2 Chester Street West, Christchurch, New Zealand; 43.5279°S 172.6290°E

Information
- Type: Private, Co-educational, Primary
- Motto: Latin: Semper fidelis ("Always Faithful")
- Established: 1881
- Ministry of Education Institution no.: 368
- Chairperson: Andrew Shaw
- Headmaster: Scott Thelning
- Chaplain: Teresa Kundycki-Carrell
- Enrolment: 245 (July 2026)
- Socio-economic decile: 10
- Website: cathedralgrammar.school.nz

The Cathedral Grammar School is an independent, Anglican preparatory day school in Christchurch, New Zealand. The school is situated on a site covering two blocks in mid-Christchurch next to the Avon River and adjacent to Hagley Park, which it uses for its playing fields. It is in proximity to Christ's College, the Canterbury Museum, the Christchurch Art Gallery and the Christchurch CBD.

The school was founded in 1881 to educate the choristers of Christ Church Cathedral, an objective which it is still fulfilling to this day. Cathedral Grammar is a member of the Choir Schools Association whose members include the ancient cathedral choirs of the United Kingdom – Westminster Abbey, King's College, Cambridge, Magdalen College, St Paul's Cathedral, to name but a few. It is one of only two small number of choir schools in the Southern Hemisphere, since Christchurch Cathedral is the only Anglican cathedral in New Zealand to have an English-style male-only Cathedral choir.

Almost immediately after its establishment, admission to the school was also opened to boys who were not choristers, and girls were accepted into the school from 1988.

== Organisation and education ==
Unique amongst Christchurch schools as well as New Zealand primary schools, Cathedral Grammar provides education to both boys and girls on the same grounds, with the Girls' School opening in 1995.

The school is divided into four departments. The preschool is co-ed, taking boys and girls from ages three to four. The Junior School is also co-ed for pupils from Years 1–3 (ages five to seven). In the Preparatory School, a separate Girls' School and Boys' School provide largely single sex classes. Classes in Mathematics are co-ed at this level from Year 6 on; English at Year 7 on, and in Year 8 one period of science is shared per week. The Boys' and Girls' School combine for chapel services, orchestra, assemblies, some sports events, operettas, and social functions. They share common playgrounds.

The Headmaster is Scott Thelning. He is supported by the Heads of Department for each of the four areas of the school. Class sizes are a maximum of 17 in Year 1, 20 in Years 2 and 3 and 24 in Years 4 to 8.

Pupils of the school generally achieve high academic standards in a curriculum which covers English, Mathematics, Science, Social Science, Music, Art, Religious Education and Physical Education.

Pupils are active in the arts and in sport, with the school being a part of the cricket, hockey, and tennis competitions. They have won the Canterbury hockey tournament 12 times in a row.

== History ==
A history of the school – Jubilate: The Story of a Choir School – was written in 2006 by the Rev. Canon Roger Couper, Headmaster 1984–2001, and published by the Cathedral Grammarians' Association to celebrate the 125th anniversary of the school. In 1976, St Saviour's Chapel was relocated from Lyttelton onto the school grounds and served as the school's chapel until the February 2011 Christchurch earthquake, when the building suffered slight damage. The building was then relocated to Lyttelton again to serve as the Anglican church, so that the ground could be remediated.

=== Inveresk ===
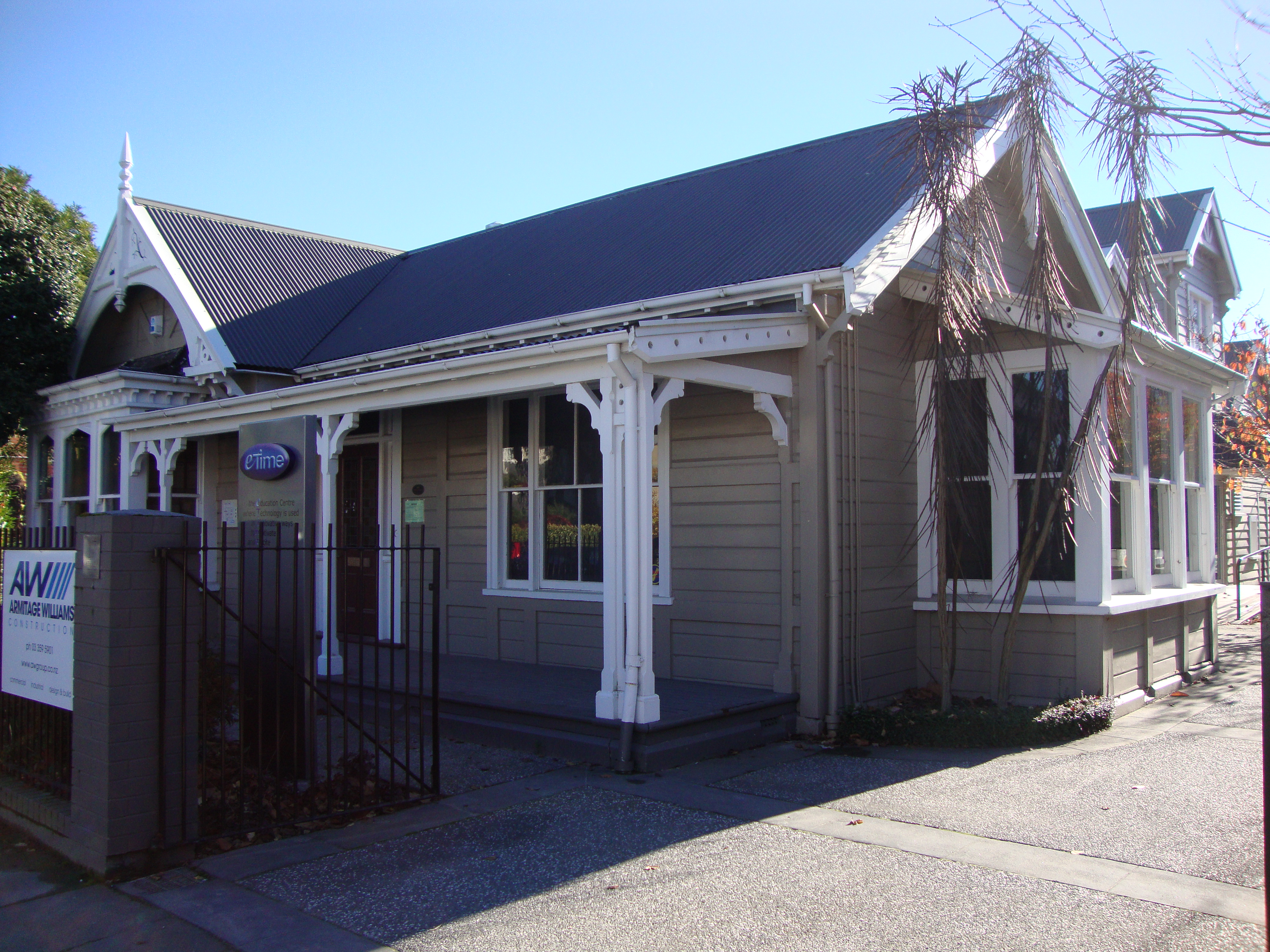
Inveresk in May 2011

In 1972, the school acquired Inveresk, a heritage building located at 17 Armagh Street, and incorporated it into the school. The cottage was originally constructed between 1863 and 1878 on land that was originally granted to Church Property Trustees (i.e. the Anglican Church) in 1858, but sold to a private person in 1863. The cottage was purchased in 1879 by John Anderson Jr, the son of the former Mayor of Christchurch and iron foundry founder John Anderson. The mayor's family home in Cashel Street was called Inveresk after his birthplace near Edinburgh in Scotland. It is assumed that when Anderson senior's house was sold in 1907, that Anderson junior transferred the name to his house in Armagh Street. One of Anderson's daughters lived in the house until 1967 and after her death, the house was sold to the Church Property Trustees, which passed it on to the school.

Cathedral Grammar intended to demolish the building, but after intervention by Christchurch City Council and the New Zealand Historic Places Trust (since renamed to Heritage New Zealand), it was retained. A further application some years later in 2001 to demolish part of the building to make room for a two-storey structure was withdrawn after opposition was received. On 14 April 2005, the NZHPT registered the building as a Category II heritage structure with registration number 3117. Inveresk closed after the 2011 Christchurch earthquake and after renovation and structural upgrade, it was opened again on 25 May 2012 by rugby coach Todd Blackadder and Bishop Victoria Matthews.

== Scholarships ==
A number of valuable choral scholarships are awarded every year to cathedral choristers. Further academic scholarships are awarded to the most academically able and/or musical applicants. These scholarships, including the Deamer scholarship (internal) and the Merton scholarship (external), are generally awarded at Years 5–8.
