= Thomas Rose (died 1747) =

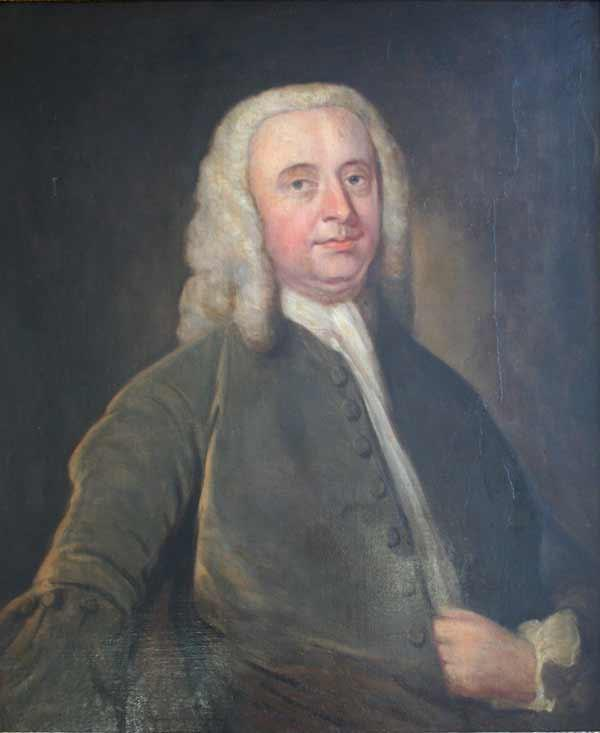
Portrait of Thomas Rose (1679-1748), by a follower of Jean Baptiste Van Loo (1684-1745)

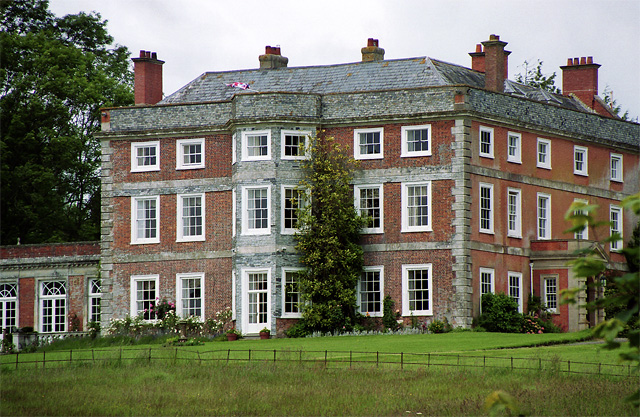
Wootton House, as remodelled in about 1765 by his second grandson Thomas Rose-Drewe (1740-1815)

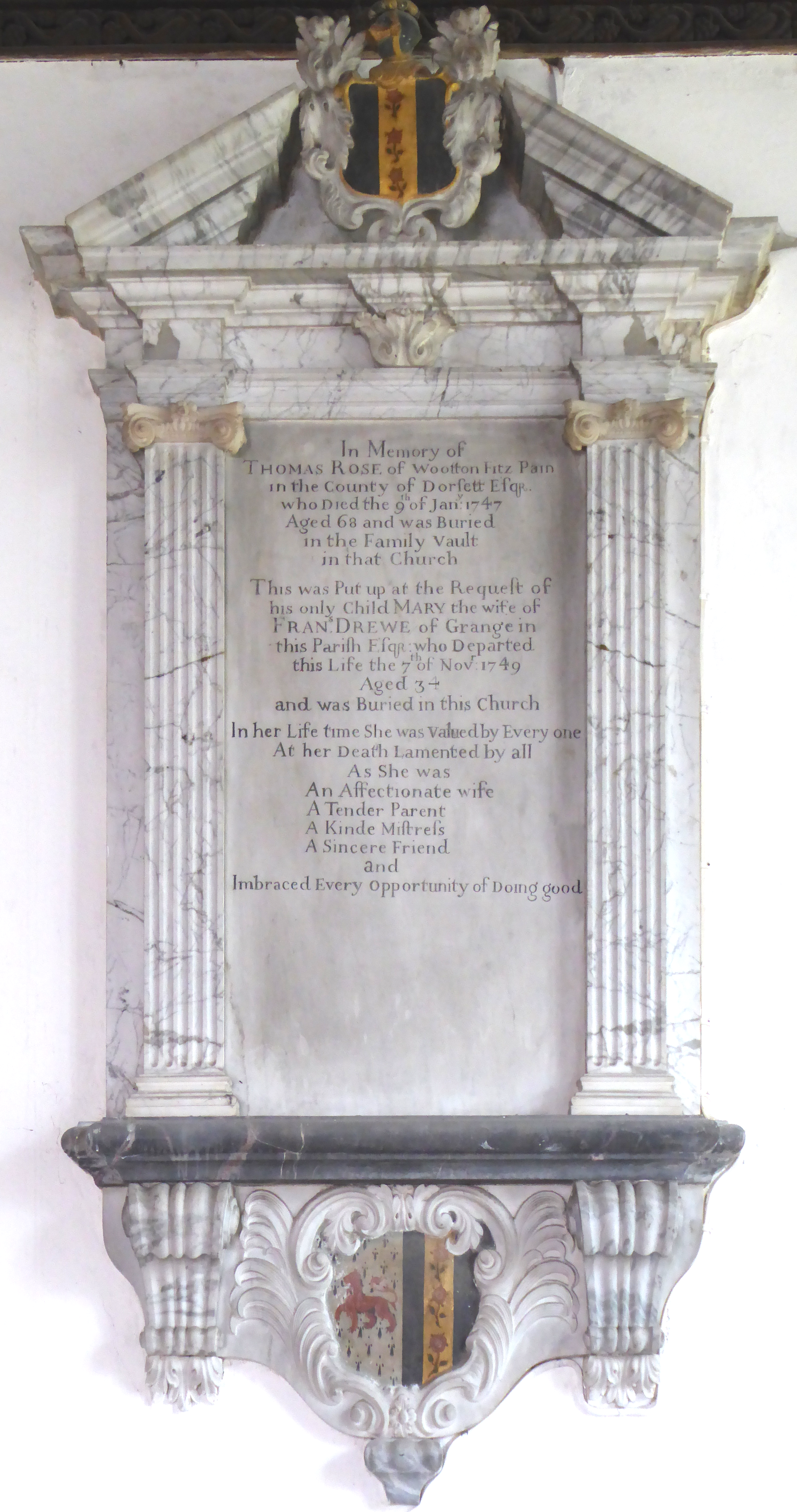
Mural monument to Thomas Rose (1679-1748), Broadhembury Church, Devon

Thomas Rose (1679-1748) of Wootton House in the parish of Wootton Fitzpaine in Dorset was Sheriff of Dorset in 1715.

== Origins ==
The earliest recorded member of the Rose family is John Rose of St Burlado (Saint Brélade) on the Island of Jersey, who served as Mayor of Lyme Regis in Dorset in 1611. He married Fayth Ellesdon, a daughter of Ralph Ellesdon. His son was Richard Rose (died c. 1658), a Member of Parliament for Lyme Regis (1639–55), who married Elizabeth Henley, a daughter of Henry Henley of Leigh.

== Marriage and progeny ==
He left an only child and sole heiress:

- Mary Rose (1715-1749), who died aged 34, having married (as his first wife) Francis Drewe (1712–1773) of Grange in the parish of Broadhembury in Devon, Sheriff of Devon in 1738. She bore seven sons, six of whom survived their father, four of whom inherited Grange successively, several having adopted the surname "Rose-Drewe".

== Death ==
He died on 9 January 1747/48, aged 68. "A stone of eight ounces and one dram was found in his kidneys". His mural monument survives in Broadhembury Church, Devon, erected by his daughter Mrs Drewe. It displays at top the canting arms of Rose: Sable, on a pale or three roses gules slipt and leaved proper; Crest at top: A rose slipped and leaved; bottom: Drewe (Ermine, a lion passant gules) impaling Rose. It is inscribed as follows:

"In memory of Thomas Rose of Wootton FitzPain in the county of Dorsett, Esqr, who died the 9th of Jan'y 1747 aged 68 and was buried in the family vault in that church. This was put up at the request of his only child Mary, the wife of Fran(ci)s Drewe of Grange in this parish, Esqr, who departed this life the 7th of Nov'r 1749 aged 34 and was buried in this church. In her life time she was valued by every one, at her death lamented by all, as she was an affectionate wife, a tender parent, a kinde mistress, a sincere friend and imbraced every opportunity of doing good"
