= Richard Cromwell Carpenter =

English architect (1812–1855)

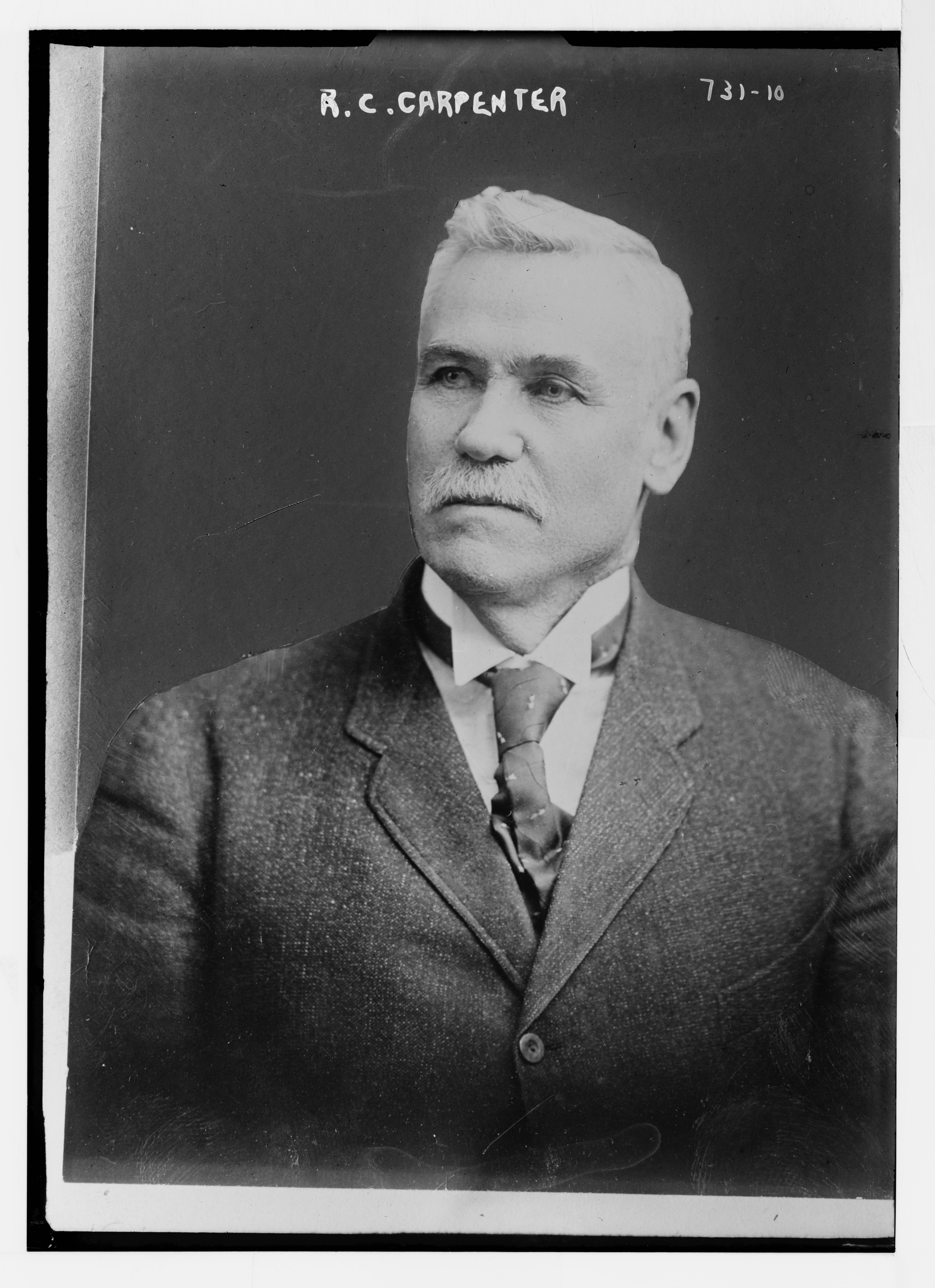
- Born: 21 October 1812; London, England
- Died: 27 March 1855 (aged 42); London, England
- Occupation: Architect
- Known for: Gothic designs

Richard Cromwell Carpenter (21 October 1812 – 27 March 1855) was an English architect. He is chiefly remembered as an ecclesiastical and tractarian architect working in the Gothic Revival style.

== Family ==
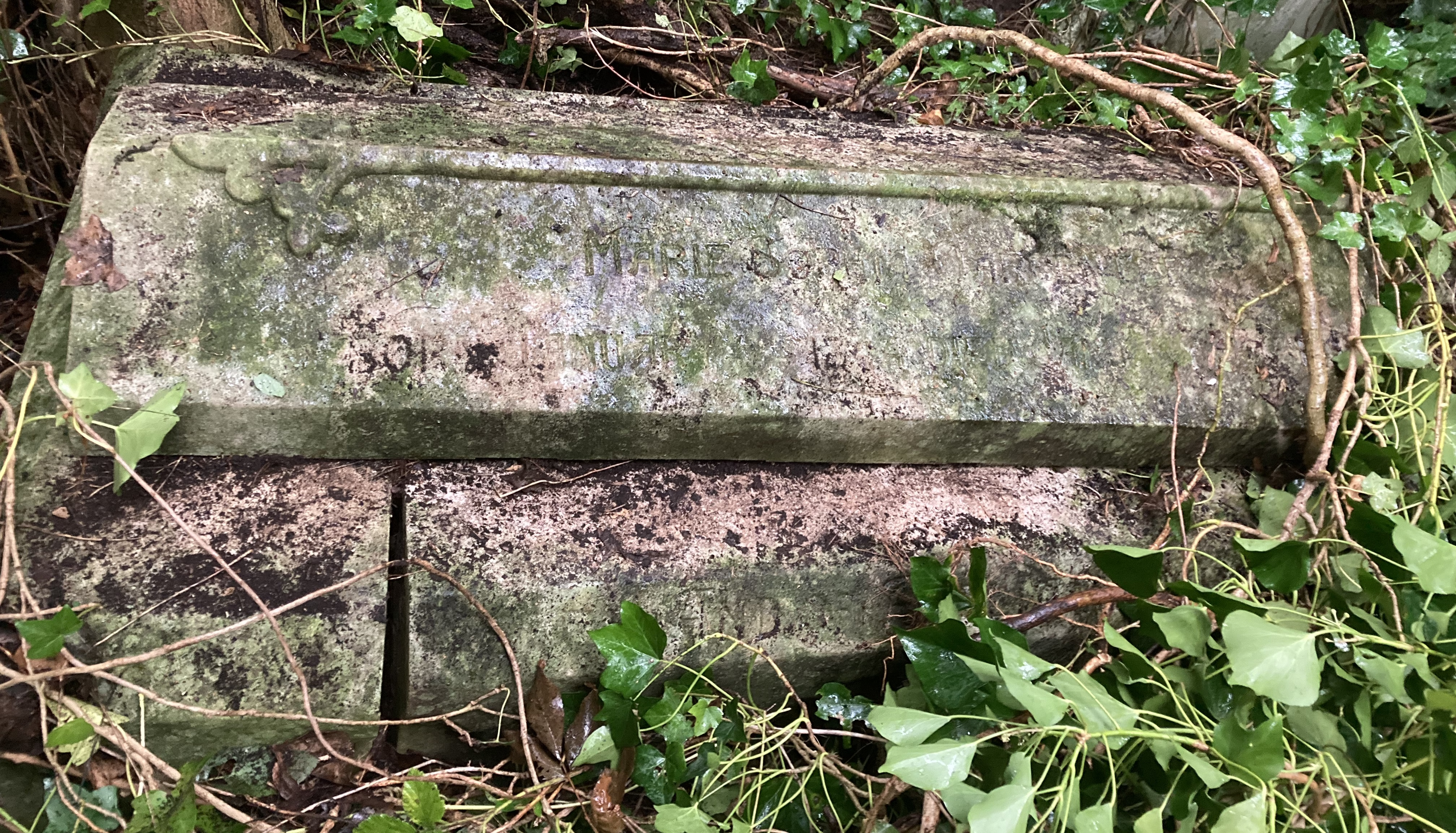
Family vault of Richard Cromwell Carpenter in Highgate Cemetery

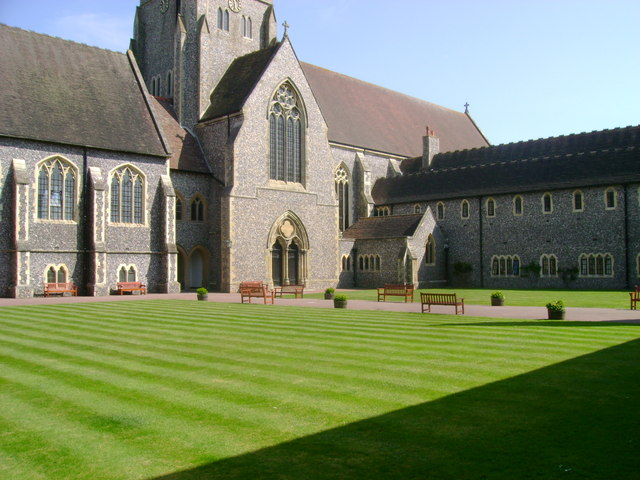
Hurstpierpoint College

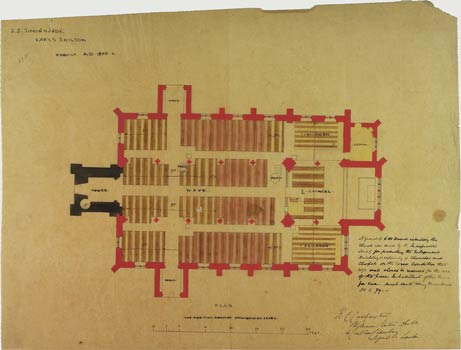
The parish church at Earl Shilton designed by Richard Cromwell Carpenter. Retaining the tower of the former church, the new building was in a medieval Gothic style.

Carpenter was born on 21 October 1812 in Russell Square, London, the son of another Richard Carpenter, a magistrate (baptised 20 July 1788 in St. Giles, Cripplegate) and Sophia (Page) Carpenter. His parents had married in 1804 in St. James, Clerkenwell, London, and lived a moderately affluent family life in Russell Square.

He married Amelia Dollman, who was born about 1818 at Loders, Dorset. Their son Richard Herbert Carpenter (born 1841 in St. Pancras, London, died 1893) was also a Gothic revival ecclesiastical architect.

Carpenter died from tuberculosis on 27 March 1855, at his home in Upper Bedford Place, Russell Square, aged 42, and was buried in a family vault on the western side of Highgate Cemetery. His obituary in the Gentleman's Magazine said "it is in fact to be feared, that his laborious and zealous application to his profession tended to shorten his life."

== Career ==
He was educated at Charterhouse School and then articled to the architect John Blyth. He soon became enthusiastic about Gothic architecture and was, possibly when aged only nineteen, commissioned to draw up plans for a large church in Islington by the Rev. Thomas Mortimer. The intended site was, however, used instead for an Irvingite chapel, and the first church that Carpenter built was St Stephen, Birmingham, in around 1841, At about this time he became a member of the tractarian Cambridge Camden Society (soon to become the Ecclesiological Society) to which he was introduced by Pugin. His next major commission, also in Birmingham, was the church of St Andrew.(1844).

As a member of the Cambridge movement — a group of Tractarians devoted to the return of medieval forms of liturgy and church building within the Church of England — he championed the move away from the Palladian-influenced Classical architecture of the late-18th and early-19th centuries towards the Gothic Revival style which was to typify the Victorian period.

Two of Carpenter's most important buildings were the schools commissioned by Nathaniel Woodard at Lancing and Hurstpierpoint. He began drawing up the plans for Lancing College in 1848, although construction did not begin until 1854. Ian Nairn wrote that the school's lower quadrangle "shows Carpenter's quiet virtues to perfection". The present spectacular chapel was begun by his son Richard Herbert Carpenter in 1868. Construction of the less grandiose College at Hurstpierpoint began earlier, in 1851.

Carpenter was consulting architect to Chichester Cathedral, carrying out restorations there, and at Sherborne Abbey and many smaller churches. He also held the post of district surveyor for East Islington.

He was described by Charles Locke Eastlake as "foremost among professional designers for his accurate knowledge of ancient work, his inventive power, and his refined treatment of decorative details."

He died shortly after submitting grandiose plans for the new Inverness Cathedral; as a consequence his plan was not executed.

== Influence ==
Carpenter was the teacher and mentor of the eminent New Zealand architect Benjamin Mountfort. Heavily influenced by Carpenter's form of Gothic revival, Mountfort took many of Carpenter's ideals to New Zealand where he became the country's leading church architect, with over forty churches and other buildings in the Gothic style attributed to him. Many of Mountfort's New Zealand designs, especially those in the province of Canterbury, were openly borrowed from Carpenter.

One of Carpenter's designs, based on his All Saints Church, Brighton (since demolished) was executed in modified form in the United States, where it survives as St. Mark's Episcopal Church in Philadelphia, Pennsylvania. His plans for a "town-church" approved by the Cambridge Camden Society were provided to the Saint Mark's vestry and given to architect John Notman, who altered them to better suit the site and local climate.

== Works ==
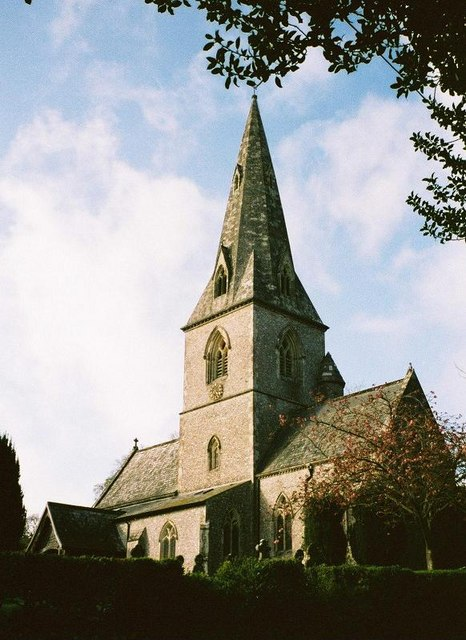
Monkton Wyld, parish church of St Andrew

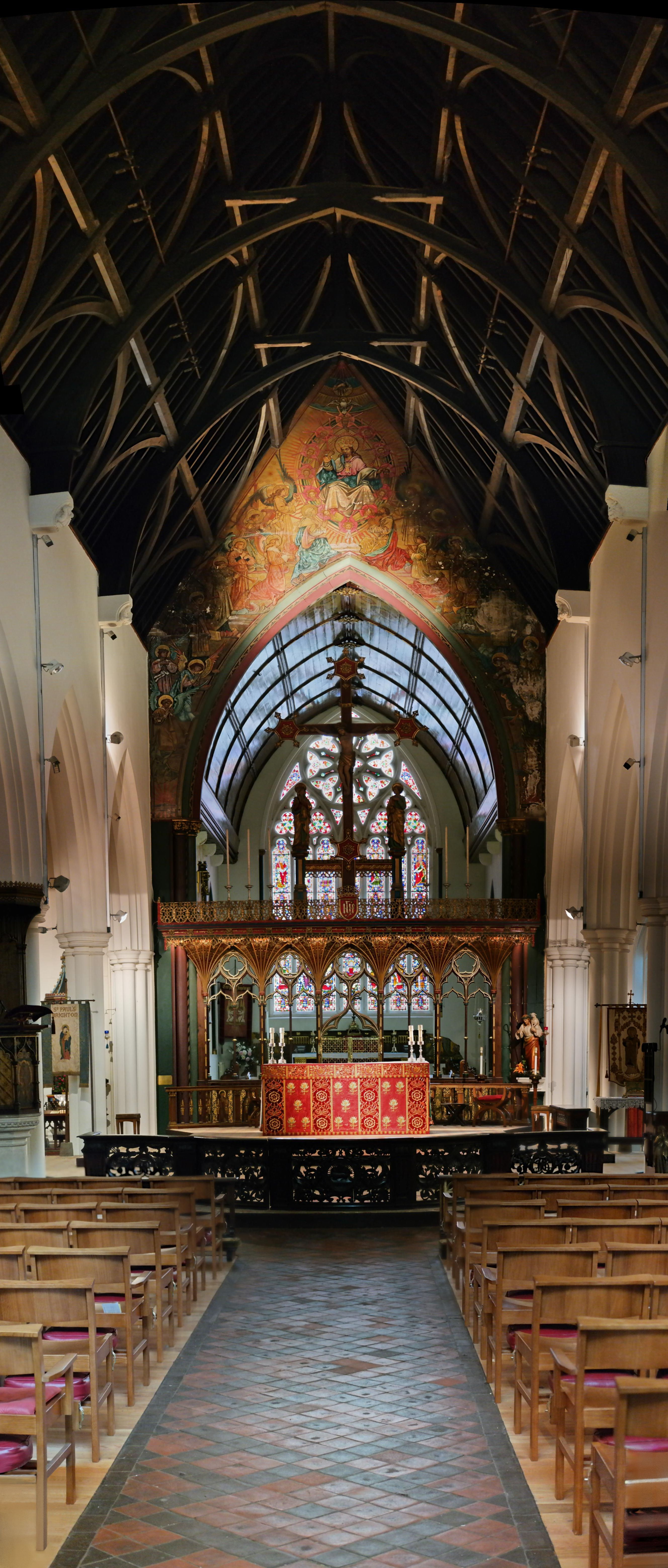
St Paul, Brighton, interior

=== Churches ===
- St Stephen the Martyr's Church, Newtown Row, Birmingham Consecrated 1844.
- St Andrew's Church, Bordesley (1843–6).
- St John the Baptist, Cookham Dean (1843).
- Chancel screen and stalls for the church at Kilndown, Kent.
- Monument to Lord and Lady Beresford, Kilndown, Kent.
- St James, Stubbings, Berkshire.
- St Nicholas, Kemerton.
- St Andrew, Monkton Wyld, Dorset.
- St Paul, Brighton (1846–48).
- All Saints, Brighton.
- St Peter the Great, Chichester (1848–52).
- Christchurch, Milton-next-Gravesend.
- St John Baptist, Bovey Tracey, Devon.
- St Mary Magdalene, Munster Square, London (1849–51).
- St Simon and St Jude, Earl Shilton.

=== Other works ===
- Almshouses at Belmont, Hereford.
- Alterations to Campden House, Gloucestershire.
- Alterations to Bedgebury Park, Kent.
- Lancing College (first designs 1848; construction began 1854).
- College of St John, Hurstpierpoint (built 1851–3).
- Lonsdale Square, Islington.
- Rectory, Monkton Wyld, Dorset (now called Monkton Wyld Court)

=== Publications ===
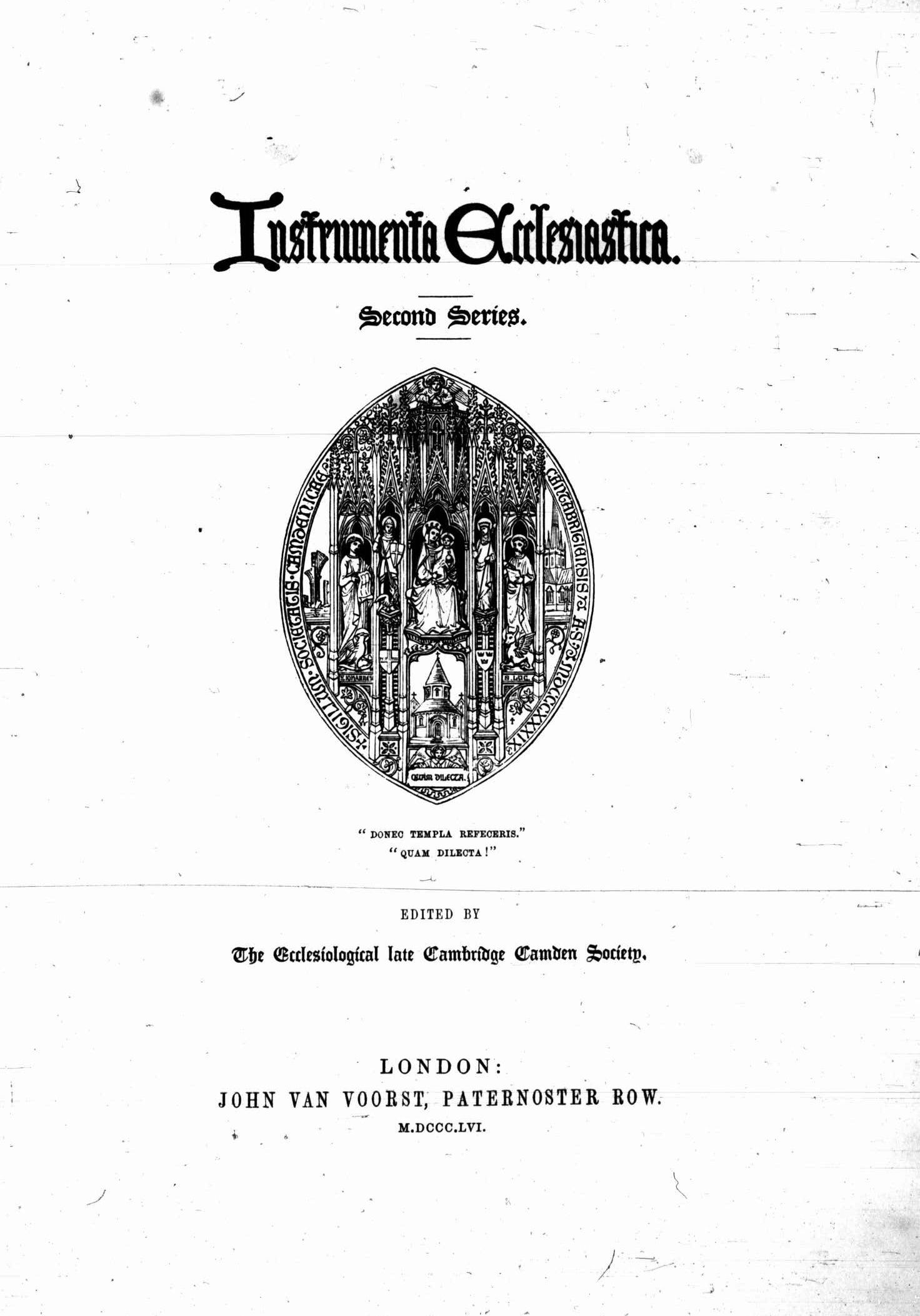
Instrumenta Ecclesiastica, 1856

- Instrumenta Ecclesiastica (in Latin). London. 1856.

== See also ==
- List of works by R. C. Carpenter
