= Benjamin Mountfort =

English architect, emigrant to New Zealand (1825–1898)

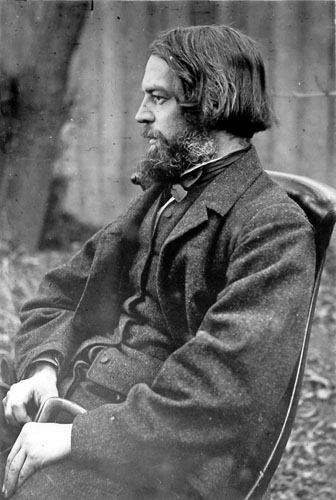
- Mountfort around 1875
- Born: Benjamin Woolfield Mountfort; 13 March 1825; Birmingham, England
- Died: 15 March 1898 (aged 73); Christchurch, New Zealand
- Resting place: Holy Trinity Avonside Cemetery
- Occupation: Architect
- Years active: 1852–1897
- Spouse: Emily Elizabeth Newman
- Children: 9
- Parent(s): Thomas Mountfort; Susannah Mountfort
- Buildings: Selected buildings

Benjamin Woolfield Mountfort (13 March 1825 – 15 March 1898) was an English emigrant to New Zealand, where he became one of the country's most prominent 19th-century architects. He was instrumental in shaping the city of Christchurch's unique architectural identity and culture, and was appointed the first official Provincial Architect of the developing province of Canterbury. Heavily influenced by the Anglo-Catholic philosophy behind early Victorian architecture, he is credited with importing the Gothic Revival style to New Zealand. His Gothic designs constructed in both wood and stone in the province are considered unique to New Zealand. Today, he is considered the founding architect of the province of Canterbury.

== Early life ==
Mountfort was born on 13 March 1825 in Birmingham, an industrial town in the Midlands of England. He was the son of perfume manufacturer and jeweller Thomas Mountfort and his wife Susanna (née Woolfield). As a young adult he moved to London, where he was an early pupil of George Gilbert Scott (from 1841 to 1846). He also studied architecture under the Anglo-Catholic architect Richard Cromwell Carpenter, whose medieval Gothic style of design was to have a lifelong influence on Mountfort. After completion of his training in 1848, Mountfort practised architecture in London. He married Emily Elizabeth Newman on 20 August 1850, and 18 days later the couple emigrated to New Zealand, along with Benjamin's brother Charles Wheeler Mountfort and his wife Mary. They were some of the first settlers to the province of Canterbury, arriving on one of the famed First Four Ships, the Charlotte Jane, on 16 December 1850. These first settlers, known as "The Pilgrims", have their names engraved on marble plaques in Cathedral Square, Christchurch, in front of the cathedral that Mountfort helped to design.

== New Zealand ==
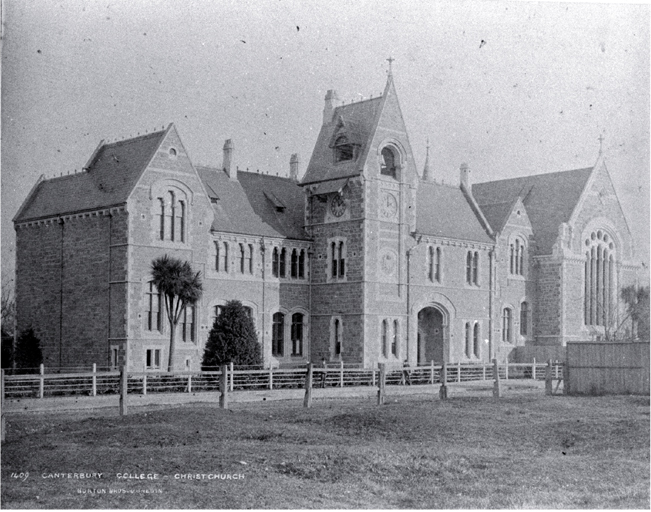
Canterbury College, designed by Benjamin Mountfort in 1877, is dominated by a central clock tower, with a medieval style great hall to the right.

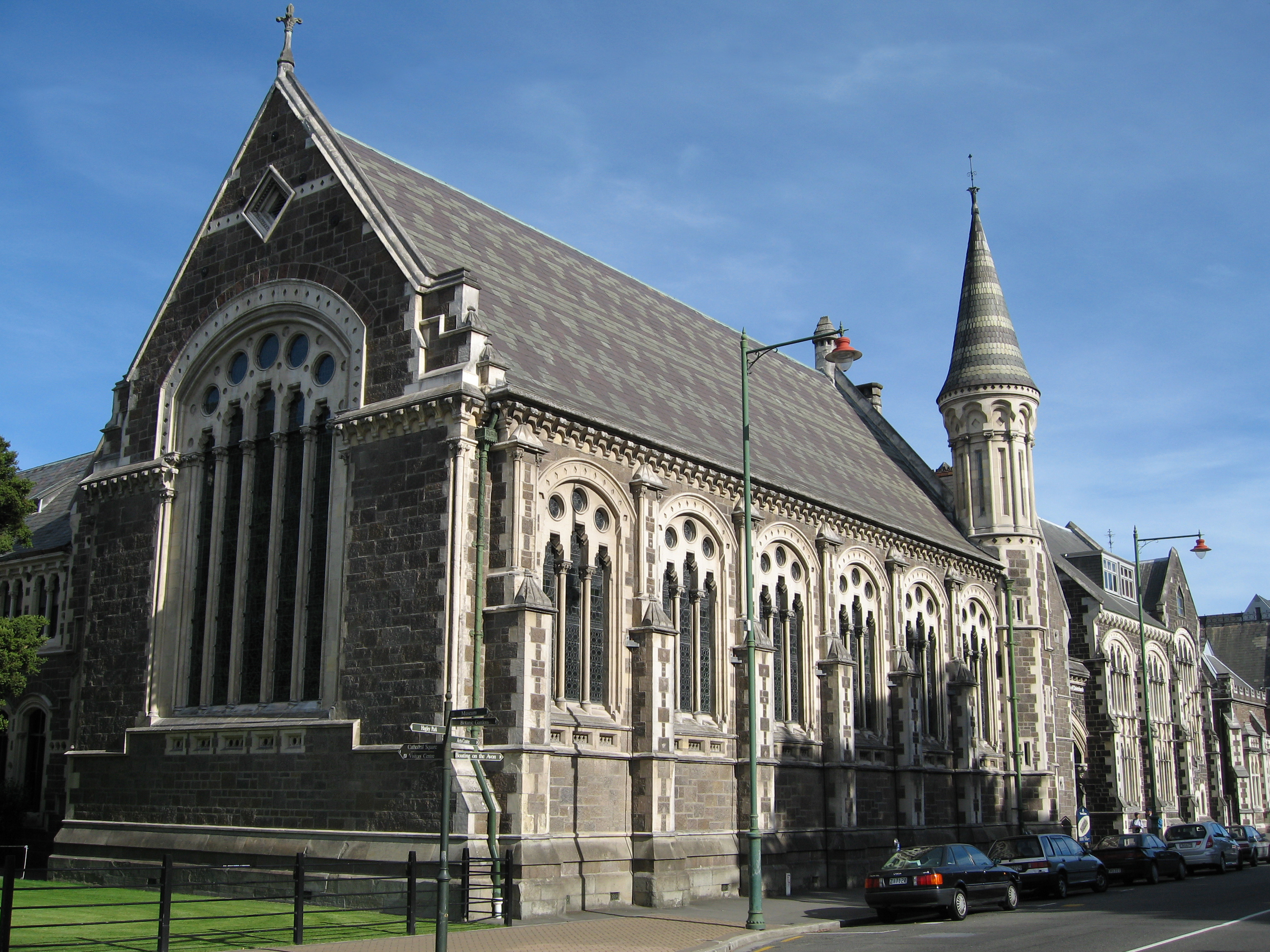
Canterbury College, The Great Hall, pictured to the right of illustration above

Mountfort arrived in Canterbury full of ambition and drive to begin designing in 1850 as one of a wave of settlers encouraged to immigrate to the new colony of New Zealand by the British Government. With him and his wife from England also came his brother Charles, sister Susannah, and Charles' wife, all five of them aged between 21 and 26. Life in New Zealand at first was hard and disappointing: Mountfort found that there was little call for architects. Christchurch was little more than a large village of basic wooden huts on a windswept plain.

The new émigré's architectural life in New Zealand had a disastrous beginning. His first commission in New Zealand was the Church of the Most Holy Trinity in Lyttelton, built in 1852 by Isaac Luck. The building proved vulnerable to high winds and was considered unsafe. It was demolished in 1857. This calamity was attributed to the use of unseasoned wood and his lack of knowledge of the local building materials. Whatever the cause, the result was a crushing blow to his reputation. A local newspaper called him "... a half-educated architect whose buildings... have given anything but satisfaction, he being evidently deficient in all knowledge of the principles of construction, though a clever draughtsman and a man of some taste.".

Due to this blow to his reputation, he began running a stationery shop, working as a newspaper agent, and giving drawing lessons until 1857 to supplement his architectural work. It was during this period in the architectural wilderness that he developed a lifelong interest in photography and supplemented his meagre income by taking photographic portraits.

Mountfort was a Freemason and an early member of the Lodge of Unanimity, the main building of which he designed in 1863. The Lodge of Unanimity was the first Masonic Lodge in the South Island.

== Return to architecture ==
In 1857, he returned to architecture and entered into a business partnership with his sister Susannah's new husband, Isaac Luck. Mountfort's career received a fillip when he was commissioned to design the St John's Anglican church at Waikouaiti in Otago. A small timber structure in the Gothic style, it was completed on 19 December 1858 on land donated by the ex-whaler Johnny Jones. It is still in use as a church, the oldest such structure in southern New Zealand. Now within the boundaries of the city of Dunedin its simple pit-sawn timber interior successfully conjures a sense of spirituality.

Christchurch was under heavy development at this time, as it had just been granted city status and the new administrative capital of the province of Canterbury. This provided Mountfort and Luck ample opportunity to practise their trade. In 1855, they produced a preliminary design for the new Canterbury Provincial Council Buildings in timber. The buildings were constructed from 1857 to 1859, but in a more limited form than the original design. As the Provincial Council gained new functions with growth in the population and economy of the province, the buildings were enlarged with a north wing in stone and an iron clock tower from 1859 to 1860, and further enlarged with a stone council chamber and refreshment rooms in 1864–65. The buildings today are regarded as one of Mountfort's most important works.

From the exterior, the building appears austere, as was much of Mountfort's early work: a central tower dominates two flanking gabled wings in the Gothic revival style. However, the interior was a riot of colour and medievalism as perceived through Victorian eyes; it included stained glass windows, and a large double-faced clock, thought to be one of only five around the globe. The chamber is decorated in a rich, almost Ruskinesque style, with carvings by a local sculptor William Brassington. Included in the carvings are representations of indigenous New Zealand species.

== Gothic architecture ==
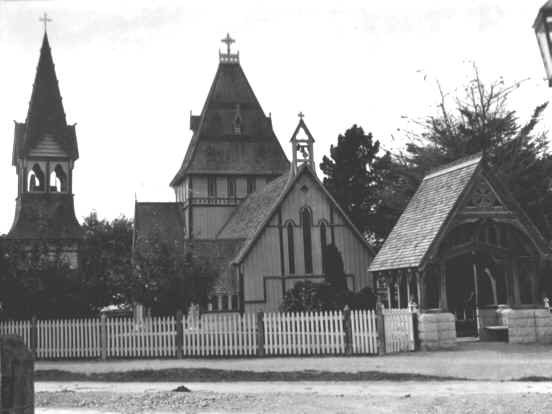
St Augustine's Church in Waimate. Mountfort's Gothic in wood, designed in 1872, has the campanile of a medieval cathedral in miniature, neighboured by the roof of a chateau, entered by the lychgate of an English parish church, all successfully harmonised into a New Zealand landscape.

The Gothic Revival style of architecture began to gain in popularity from the late 18th century as a romantic backlash against the more classical and formal styles which had predominated the previous two centuries. At the age of 16, Mountfort acquired two books written by the Gothic revivalist Augustus Pugin: The True Principles of Christian or Pointed Architecture and An Apology for the Revival of Christian Architecture. From this time onwards, Mountfort was a disciple of Pugin's strong Anglo-Catholic architectural values. These values were further cemented in 1846, at the age of 21, Mountfort became a pupil of Richard Cromwell Carpenter.

Carpenter was, like Mountfort, a devout Anglo-Catholic and subscribed to the theories of Tractarianism, and thus to the Oxford and Cambridge Movements. These conservative theological movements taught that true spirituality and concentration in prayer was influenced by the physical surroundings, and that the medieval church had been more spiritual than that of the early 19th century. As a result of this theology, medieval architecture was declared to be of greater spiritual value than the classical Palladian-based styles of the 18th and early 19th centuries. Augustus Pugin even pronounced that medieval architecture was the only form suitable for a church and that Palladianism was almost heretical. Such theory was not confined to architects, and continued well into the 20th century. This school of thought led intellectuals such as the English poet Ezra Pound to prefer Romanesque buildings to Baroque on the grounds that the latter represented an abandonment of the world of intellectual clarity and light for a set of values based on the notion of hell and the increasing dominance of society by bankers, a breed to be despised.

Whatever the philosophy behind the Gothic Revival, in London the 19th-century rulers of the British Empire felt that Gothic architecture was suitable for the colonies because of its then strong Anglican connotations, representing hard work, morality and conversion of native peoples. The irony of this was that many of Mountfort's churches were for Roman Catholics, as so many of the new immigrants were of Irish origin. To the many middle-class English empire builders, Gothic represented a nostalgic reminder of the parishes left behind in Britain with their true medieval architecture; these were the patrons who chose the architects and designs.

Mountfort's early Gothic work in New Zealand was of the more severe Anglican variety as practised by Carpenter, with tall lancet windows and many gables. As his career progressed, and he had proved himself to the employing authorities, his designs developed into a more European form, with towers, turrets and high ornamental roof lines in the French manner, a style which was in no way peculiar to Mountfort but was endorsed by such architects as Alfred Waterhouse in Britain.

Mountfort's skill as an architect lay in adapting these flamboyant styles to suit the limited materials available in New Zealand. While wooden churches are plentiful in certain parts of the United States, they are generally of a simple classic design, whereas Mountfort's wooden churches in New Zealand are as much ornate Gothic fantasies as those he designed in stone. Perhaps the flamboyance of his work can be explained in a statement of principles he and his partner Luck wrote when bidding to win the commission to design Government House, Auckland in 1857:

Accordingly, we see in Nature's buildings, the mountains and hills; not regularity of outline but diversity; buttresses, walls and turrets as unlike each other as possible, yet producing a graduation of effect not to be approached by any work, moulded to regularity of outline. The simple study of an oak or an elm tree would suffice to confute the regularity theory.

== Provincial Architect ==
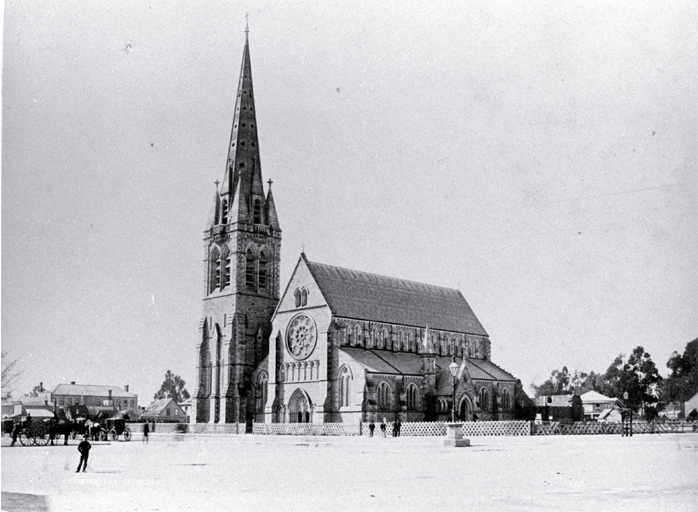
The construction of ChristChurch Cathedral, designed by George Gilbert Scott, was supervised by Benjamin Mountfort who designed the spire.

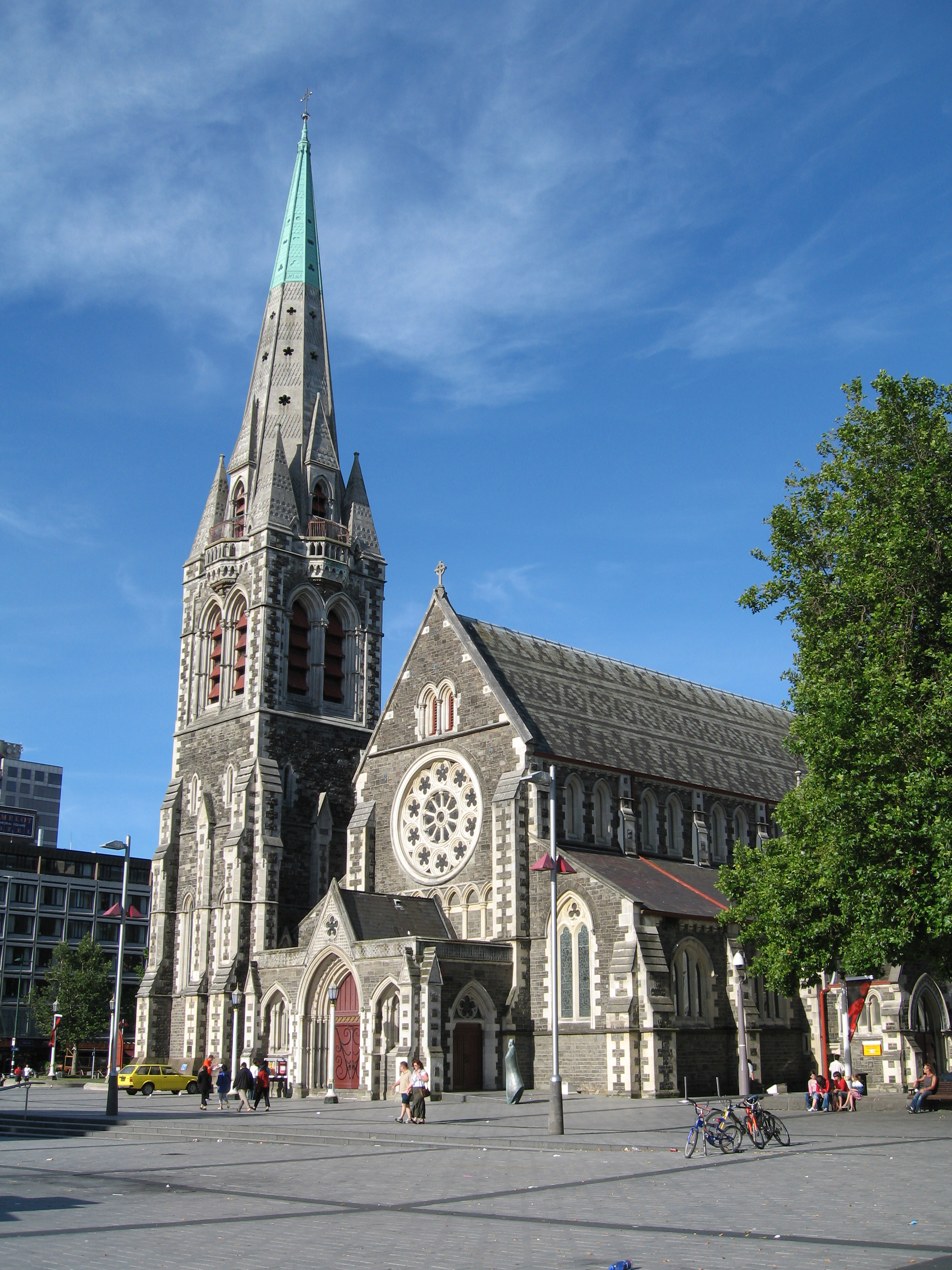
The ChristChurch was completed in 1904. Until the 2011 earthquake and the collapse of the spire, the building remained almost unaltered.

As the "Provincial Architect"—a newly created position to which Mountfort was appointed in 1864—Mountfort designed a wooden church for the Roman Catholic community of the city of Christchurch. This wooden erection was subsequently enlarged several times until it was renamed a cathedral. It was eventually replaced in 1901 by the Cathedral of the Blessed Sacrament, a more permanent stone building by the architect Frank Petre, though the cenotaph by Mountfort was preserved. Mountfort often worked in wood, a material he in no way regarded as an impediment to the Gothic style, though he was unique in this respect as Gothic buildings were often created from stone and mortar. Between 1869 and 1882 he designed the Canterbury Museum and subsequently Canterbury College and its clock tower in 1877.

Construction on the buildings for the Canterbury College, which later became the University of Canterbury, began with the construction of the clock tower block. This edifice, which opened in 1877, was the first purpose built university in New Zealand. The College was completed in two subsequent stages in Mountfort's usual Gothic style.

George Gilbert Scott, the architect of ChristChurch Cathedral, and an empathiser of Mountfort's teacher and mentor Carpenter, wished his former pupil Mountfort to be the clerk of works and supervising architect of the new cathedral project. This proposal was originally vetoed by the Cathedral Commission. Nevertheless, following delays in the building work attributed to financial problems, the position of supervising architect was finally given to Mountfort in 1873. Mountfort was responsible for several alterations to the absentee main architect's design, most obviously the tower and the west porch. He also designed the font, the Harper Memorial, and the north porch. The cathedral was however not finally completed until 1904, six years after Mountfort's death. The cathedral is very much in the European decorated Gothic style with an attached campanile tower beside the body of the cathedral, rather than towering directly above it in the more English tradition.

In 1872 Mountfort became a founding member of the Canterbury Association of Architects, a body which was responsible for all subsequent development of the new city. Mountfort was now at the pinnacle of his career. Mountfort notably altered the use of a segmented arch rather than one in the Romanesque style; the latter of which was considered by Augustus Pugin to be fundamentally important to the Gothic style. The college posed a challenge in its main hall; on the hall's completion in 1882, it was the largest public space in Christchurch. Additionally, a level of detail not possible in previous works was present in the hall's design due to the superior funding for the college. The completion of the first stage was met with praise and optimism, though extensions such as a biological lab were added in the early 1890s. By the 1880s, Mountfort was hailed as New Zealand's premier ecclesiastical architect, with over forty churches to his credit.

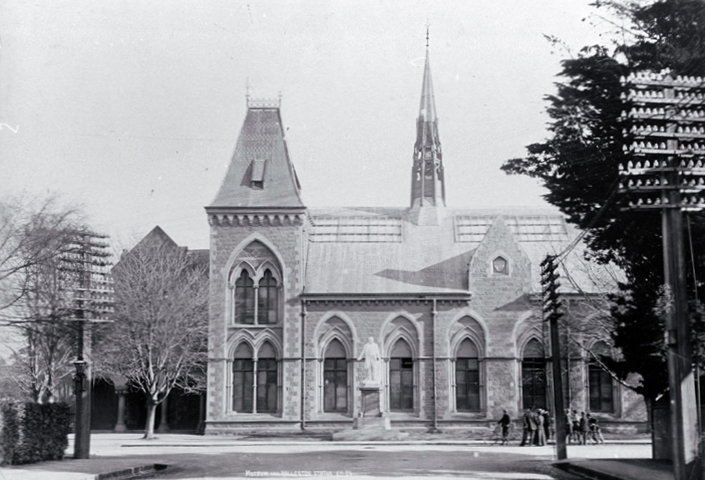
Canterbury Museum, designed by Benjamin Mountfort. Completed in 1882, in the style of a French chateau.

In 1888, he designed St John's Cathedral in Napier. This brick construction was demolished in the disastrous 1931 earthquake that destroyed much of Napier. Between 1886 and 1897, Mountfort worked on one of his largest churches, the wooden St Mary's, the cathedral church of Auckland. Covering 9,000 square feet (840 m^{2}), St Mary's is the largest and last timber church built by Mountfort, and the largest wooden Gothic church in the world. At its completion, it was said that "in point of design, completeness and beauty [it] reaches a high level mark not yet approached in the diocese". The emphasis placed on the sweeping roof by the great aisle windows struck a balance to the great area the church enclosed. In 1982 the entire church, complete with its stained glass windows, was transported to a new site, across the road from its former position where a new cathedral was to be built. St Mary's church was consecrated in 1898, one of Mountfort's final grand works.

Outside of his career, Mountfort was keenly interested in the arts and a talented artist, although his artistic work appears to have been confined to art pertaining to architecture, his first love. He was a devout member of the Church of England and a member of many Anglican church councils and diocese committees.

Mountfort's later years were blighted by professional jealousies, as his position as the province's first architect was assailed by new and younger men influenced by new orders of architecture. Benjamin Mountfort died in 1898, aged 73. He was buried in the cemetery of Holy Trinity Avonside, the church which he had extended in 1876.

== Legacy ==
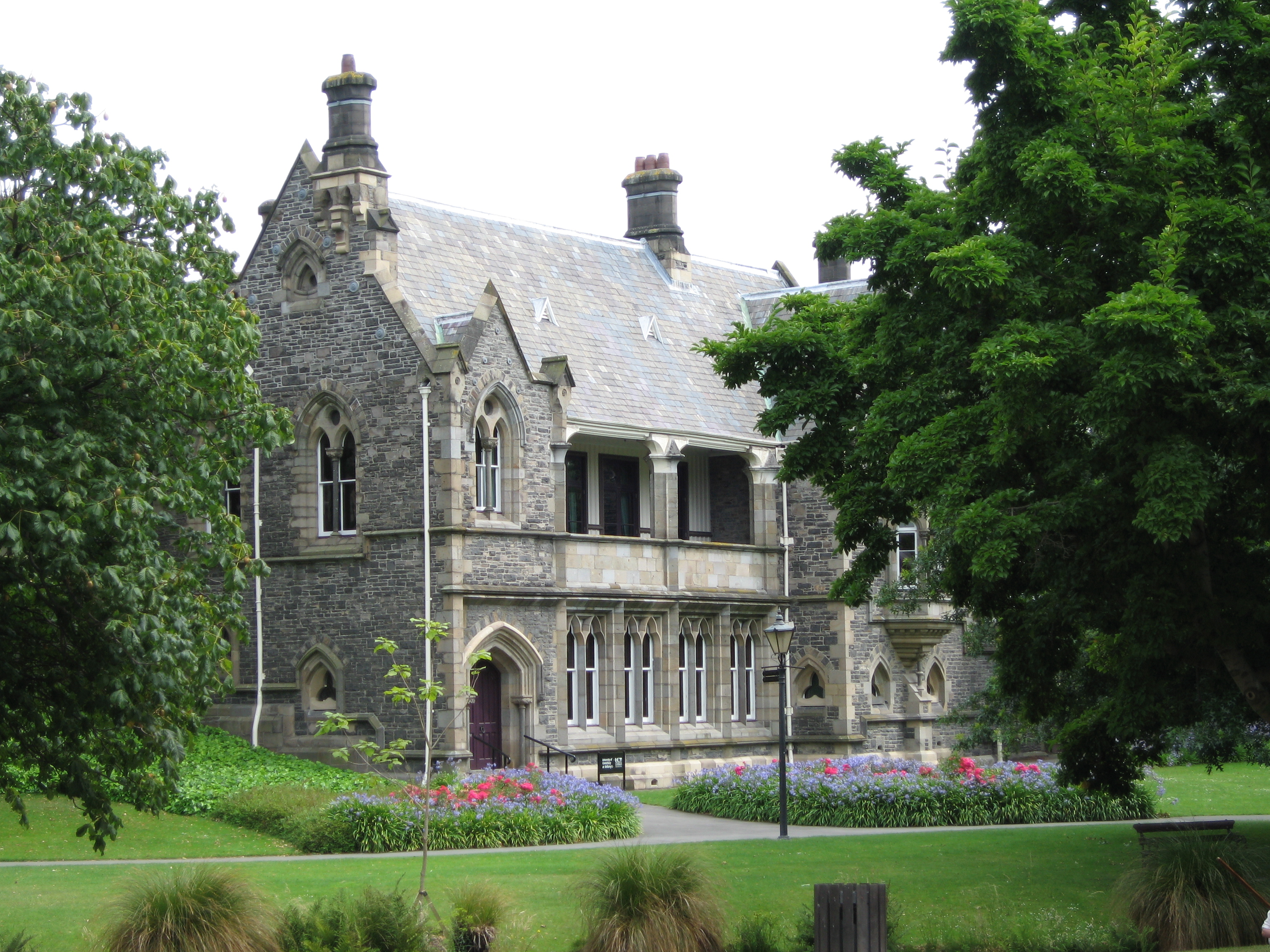
Canterbury Provincial Council Buildings. One of Mountfort's earliest New Zealand Gothic buildings, in the style he made his trademark.

Evaluating Mountfort's works today, one has to avoid judging them against a background of similar designs in Europe. In the 1860s, New Zealand was a developing country, where materials and resources freely available in Europe were conspicuous by their absence. When available they were often of inferior quality, as Mountfort discovered with the unseasoned wood in his first disastrous project. His first buildings in his new homeland were often too tall, or steeply pitched, failing to take account of the non-European climate and landscape. However, he soon adapted, and developed his skill in working with crude and unrefined materials.

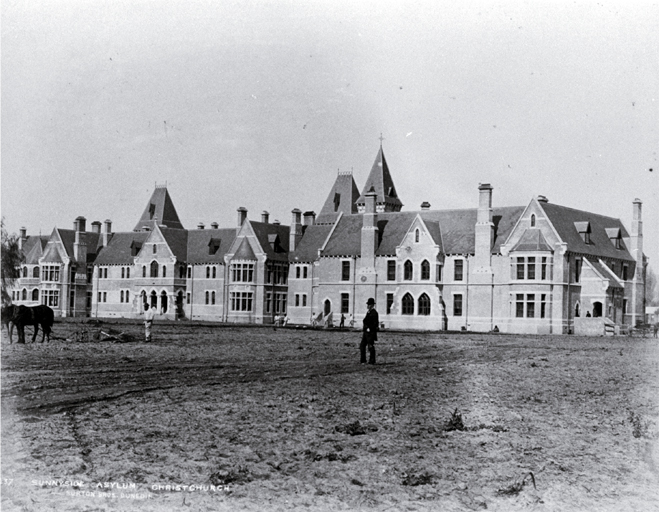
Sunnyside Asylum, Christchurch. Completed in 1891, this was one of Mountfort's last major works. Designed in a chateauesque Gothic, the large windows created the air of a country house rather than place of incarceration.

Christchurch and its surrounding areas are unique in New Zealand for their particular style of Gothic architecture, something that can be directly attributed to Benjamin Mountfort. While Mountfort did accept small private domestic commissions, he is today better known for the designs executed for public, civic bodies, and the church. His monumental Gothic stone civic buildings in Christchurch, which would not be out of place in Oxford or Cambridge, are an amazing achievement over adversity of materials. His hallmark wooden Gothic churches today epitomise the 19th-century province of Canterbury. They are accepted, and indeed appear as part of the landscape. In this way, Benjamin Mountfort's achievement was to make his favoured style of architecture synonymous with the identity of the province of Canterbury. Following his death, one of his seven children, Cyril, continued to work in his father's Gothic style well into the 20th century. Cyril Mountfort was responsible for the church of St Luke's in the City, which was an unexecuted design of his father's. In this way, and through the daily public use of his many buildings, Mountfort's legacy lives on. He ranks today with his contemporaries R A Lawson and Francis Petre as one of New Zealand's greatest 19th-century architects.

== Selected buildings ==
=== Christchurch ===
- Beth El Synagogue 1864
- Christ's College Chapel (1880s extensions)
- Christchurch Arts Centre buildings, 1882
- Canterbury Provincial Council Buildings, 1858–1865 (partially collapsed in the 2011 Christchurch earthquake. To be restored)
- Canterbury Museum, Central Christchurch, 1869–1882
- Church of the Good Shepherd, Phillipstown, 1884–1885 (demolished 2011)
- ChristChurch Cathedral, 1864–1904 (partially collapsed in the 2011 Canterbury earthquake. Under restoration)
- Holy Trinity Avonside Church Chancel, 1874–1877 (photo) (demolished 2011)
- Trinity Church, Christchurch, 1872
- St John the Baptist Church, 1864–1865 (demolished 2011)
- St Paul's Anglican Church, Papanui, 1876–1877
- Sunnyside Hospital, Hillmorton, 1881–1893 (demolished 2007)

=== Elsewhere in Canterbury ===
- Most Holy Trinity, Lyttelton, 1852 (demolished 1857)
- St. Augustine's Church, Waimate 1872
- St Stephen's, Lincoln 1877
- St John's, Rangiora.
- St Bartholomew's, Kaiapoi (1855)

=== North Island ===
- St John's Cathedral, Napier, 1886–1888
- St Mary's Church, 1886 (relocated 1982)
