= St Andrew's Church, Monkton Wyld =

Church in Dorset, England

St Andrew's Church
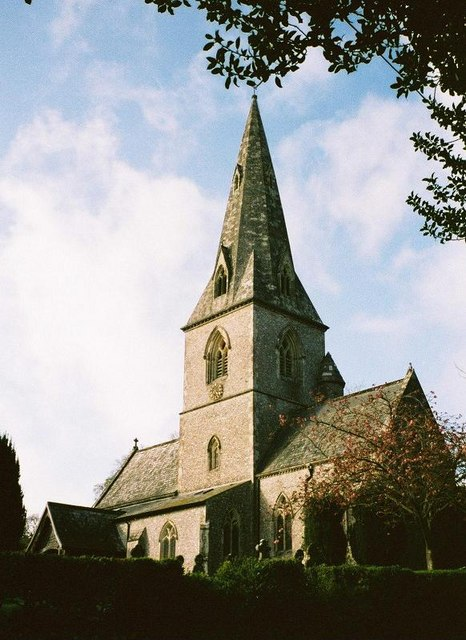
- St Andrew's Church

Religion
- Affiliation: Church of England
- Ecclesiastical or organizational status: Active
- Year consecrated: 1850

Location
- Location: Monkton Wyld, Dorset, England
- Interactive map of St Andrew's Church
- Coordinates: 50.7628°N 2.9420°W

Architecture
- Type: Church

St Andrew's Church is a Church of England church in Monkton Wyld, Dorset, England. It was built in 1848–49 to the designs of Richard Cromwell Carpenter and has been a Grade II* listed building since 1960.

== History ==
Before the construction of St Andrew's, the small settlement of Monkton Wyld was approximately five miles from the parish church of Whitchurch Canonicorum and over two miles from the nearest church. With the inhabitants expressing wishes for a church of their own, a building fund was established and much of the required funds was contributed by Mrs. Elizabeth Hodson, a patron of the hamlet. A grant towards the construction was also made by the Diocesan Church Building Association. The foundation stone was laid on 6 July 1848 by Rev. R. S. Hutchings and his wife, alongside other members of the clergy, and St Andrew's was consecrated by the Bishop of Salisbury, Edward Denison, on 14 March 1850. The church tower was later completed as intended with the addition of a spire in 1856.

A sacristy and pulpit was added in 1887, the former commemorating the jubilee of Queen Victoria and the latter in dedication to Elizabeth Dodson. Both additions were the sole expense of the rector, Rev. J. B. M. Camm and his wife, who had other additions made at their expense during the reverend's incumbency, including oak stalls added to the chancel in 1886 and a new chancel altar in 1891. The chancel screen was completed in 1888 with the addition of a rood, the work being carried out by Mr. E. L. Luscombe of Exeter to the designs of Mr. F. C. Eden of Exeter.

== Architecture ==
St Andrew's is built of flint rubble, which was sourced from the site of the church, Blue Lias and brick, with Caen stone dressings and copings, and a slate roof. It was built to accommodate 200 persons and has a cruciform plan, containing a chancel, central tower, vestry, transepts, sacristy, and nave with north and south aisles. The churchyard is accessed by an oak lychgate and the south porch contains carvings in oak. The church has a Decorated Gothic style.
