= Wootton Fitzpaine =

Village in Dorset, England

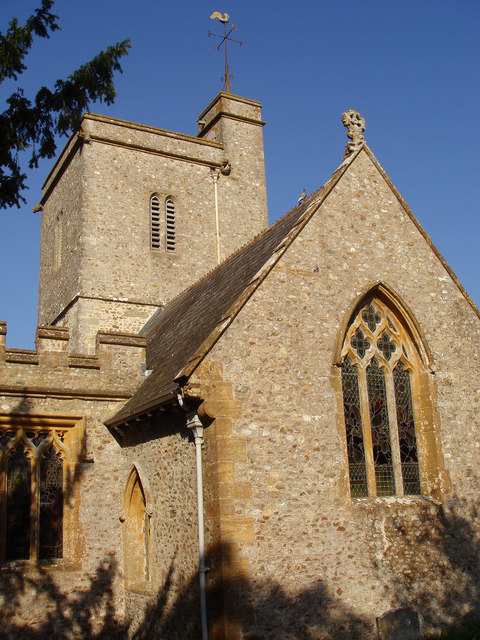
- Wootton Fitzpaine church

- Location within Dorset
- Population: 345
- OS grid reference: SY371957
- Unitary authority: Dorset
- Ceremonial county: Dorset
- Region: South West
- Country: England
- Sovereign state: United Kingdom
- Post town: Bridport
- Postcode district: DT6
- Police: Dorset
- Fire: Dorset and Wiltshire
- Ambulance: South Western
- UK Parliament: West Dorset

Wootton Fitzpaine is a village and civil parish in the county of Dorset in South West England. It lies approximately 3 miles (4.8 km) north-east of Lyme Regis in a small side valley of the River Char, close to the Marshwood Vale. The civil parish covers an area of 3,307 acres (1,338 ha) and includes the ecclesiastical parish and small settlement of Monkton Wyld to the west. In the 2011 census the civil parish had 180 dwellings, 134 households and a population of 345.

== Wootton Fitzpaine village ==
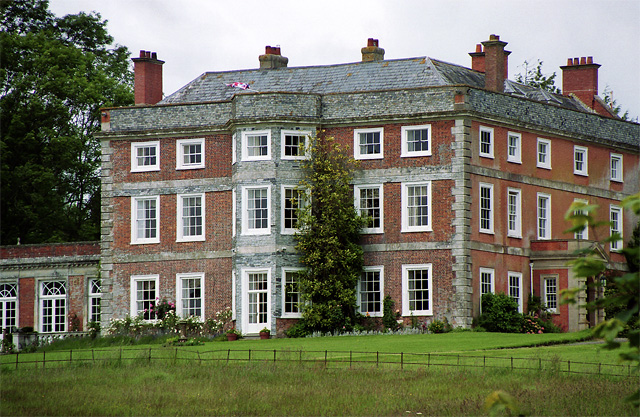
The Manor House, Wootton Fitzpaine, remodelled about 1765 by Thomas Rose-Drewe (1740-1815)

Wootton Fitzpaine village consists primarily of two small centres: a larger western part comprising the village hall and about 50 densely placed houses, and a smaller eastern part comprising about a dozen houses, the church and manor house. The village is sited on Middle Lias and greensand and has a history of being agriculturally relatively prosperous.

The village name derives from 'Wodetone', meaning a farm close to a wood, plus the name of the manorial family, Fitzpaine.

The parish church was built mostly between the 13th and 15th centuries but was restored and added to in 1872. It lies within the grounds of the adjacent Wootton House, a three-storey brick-built house re-built in about 1765 by Thomas Rose-Drewe (1740-1815), second grandson of Thomas Rose (died 1747) of Wootton House, but also restored and added to in the late 19th century. The rectory dates from the end of the 15th century. Twenty structures within the parish are listed by English Heritage for their historic or architectural interest.

The village has a website http://www.wootton-fitzpaine.co.uk/

== Monkton Wyld village ==
50.76286°N 2.94044°W

St Andrew's Church, Monkton Wyld was designed by Richard Cromwell Carpenter.

Monkton Wyld Court is the largest building in this hamlet, a Grade II listed Victoria Gothic former rectory built in 1848. It was also designed by Carpenter. It offers terraced south facing lawns, a dairy farm and an organic walled kitchen garden. The building was used between 1940 and 1982 as a progressive boarding school. From 1982, Simon Fairlie and Gill Barron ran it as an educational centre for sustainable living, The Land is Ours campaigns for Landrights in Britain there, and Guest House accommodates 42 visitors.

== Footpaths and trails ==
The Wessex Ridgeway and Monarch's Way long-distance footpaths pass through the parish, as does the Liberty Trail, a more local designated way.

== Notable residents ==
- Richard Rose (died 1658), a member of the Long Parliament
- Thomas Rose (died 1747), Sheriff of Dorset in 1715
- John Bradbury, 3rd Baron Bradbury (born 1940)
