= Cyril Mountfort =

New Zealand architect (1853–1920)

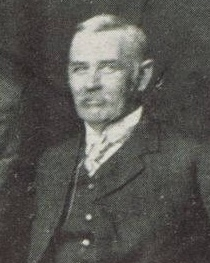
Mountfort in 1911

Cyril Julian Mountfort (5 October 1853 – 23 November 1920) was a New Zealand ecclesiastical architect. He was the second son of Benjamin Mountfort.

== Biography ==
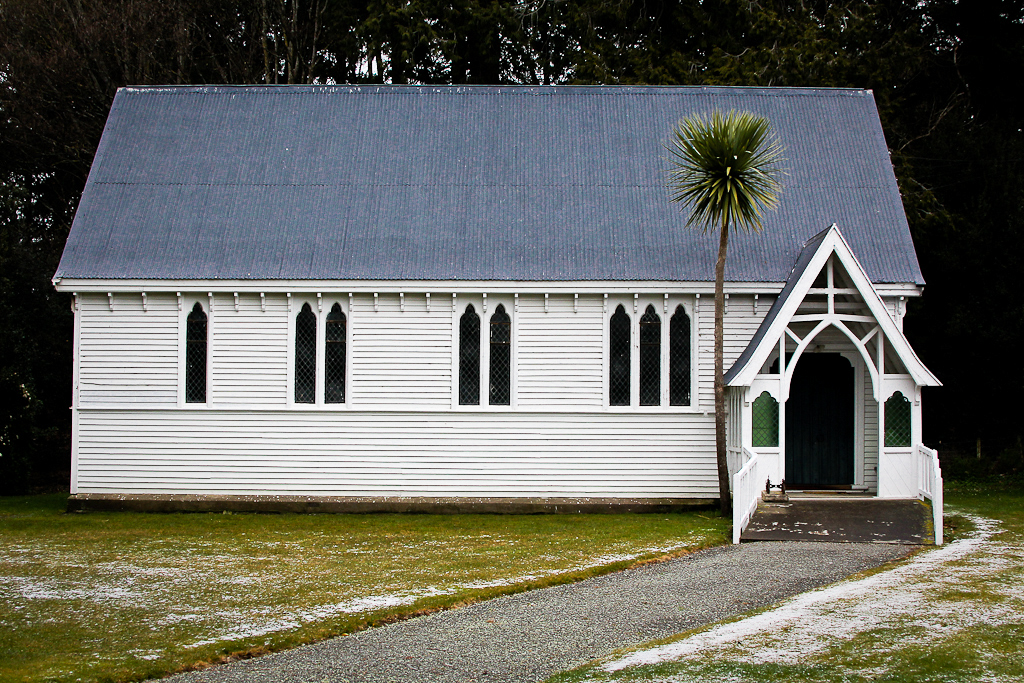
St Peter's Church in Springfield

Mountfort was born on 5 October 1853; his surname is recorded as 'Mountford' on his birth certificate with registration number 1853/725. He was educated at Christ's College and then studied architecture under his father, the prominent New Zealand architect, Benjamin Mountfort.

Mountfort worked in the same style and areas as his father, but is considered to be the lesser architect, lacking the originality of his father. He worked chiefly in the Gothic Revival style of architecture. He designed several churches in the city and suburbs of Christchurch and in the wider Canterbury region.

Within months of his father's death, he took over his practice. This included taking over his father's position as supervising architect of ChristChurch Cathedral, and he oversaw the building's completion in 1904. He served as president of the New Zealand Institute of Architects from 1909 to 1910. His best-known work in Christchurch was St Luke's Church, which was finished in 1909 but was demolished after it partially collapsed in the 2011 Christchurch earthquake.

On 30 August 1893, Mountfort married Mary Emilie Haworth at St Peter's Anglican Church in Wellington. Mountfort died in Christchurch on 23 November 1920. His health had been declining for some time. He was buried in the churchyard of Holy Trinity Avonside.

== Buildings designed ==
- St Peter's, Springfield, 1884
- St Saviour's Chapel, Lyttelton, 1885
- St Matthew's Church, Hastings, 1886
- St Luke's Church, Christchurch, 1909
- St John's Church, Hororata, 1910

Buildings with work by Cyril Mountfort

- Church of the Good Shepherd, Christchurch, 1906/07
- Holy Trinity Avonside
- St Peter's, Riccarton
