= Cambridge movement (philosophy) =

The Cambridge movement was a conservative ideological school of thought closely related to the Oxford Movement.

== History ==
It has been claimed the origins of the movement emanate from the teachings of the 16th-century Cambridge University professor and intellectual Desiderius Erasmus. However, the more readily understood beliefs of the movement began in 1833 with a sermon made by the Reverend John Keble which was hostile toward a plan by the British Government to diminish the official power of the Anglican Church in the predominantly Roman Catholic Ireland. It had been argued that it was unjust that Irish Catholic taxes should not support the Anglican Church. Keble and his supporters believed that Christianity in the form of the established Church of England was above secular government.

Within days of this sermon being preached a meeting was held at the home of Hugh James Rose. It is Rose who is generally held to be the founder of the Cambridge school of the Oxford movement while John Newman was the leader of the Oxford movement. At the meeting at Rose's home a resolution was passed to preserve “the apostolic succession and the integrity of the Prayer-Book.” Further beliefs of the movement were views that the medieval church fulfilled a greater need and ministry to its members than that of the 19th-century church.

== Stance ==
The Cambridge Movement was more liberal than its counterpart at Oxford. However, it was concerned with the aesthetics and liturgy pertaining to the more powerful and spiritual medieval church. This resulted in a great wave of Gothic Revival church architecture with its "remote but splendid high altars, vestments, and the full panoply of medieval ceremonial." The movement was championed by such followers of the Cambridge movement as Richard Cromwell Carpenter.

== Decline ==
The movement began a decline after the conversion of one of its greatest advocate John Newman to Roman Catholicism in 1845. While the movement was strongly in favour of high church ritual, conversion to Catholicism in the anti-Popish climate of the day was a step too far for the British establishment to which many of its members belonged. However, the ideological retrospective school of architecture the movement inspired lingered on for the remainder of the 19th century.
