= Phillipstown, New Zealand =

Suburb of Christchurch, New Zealand

Phillipstown
- Suburb
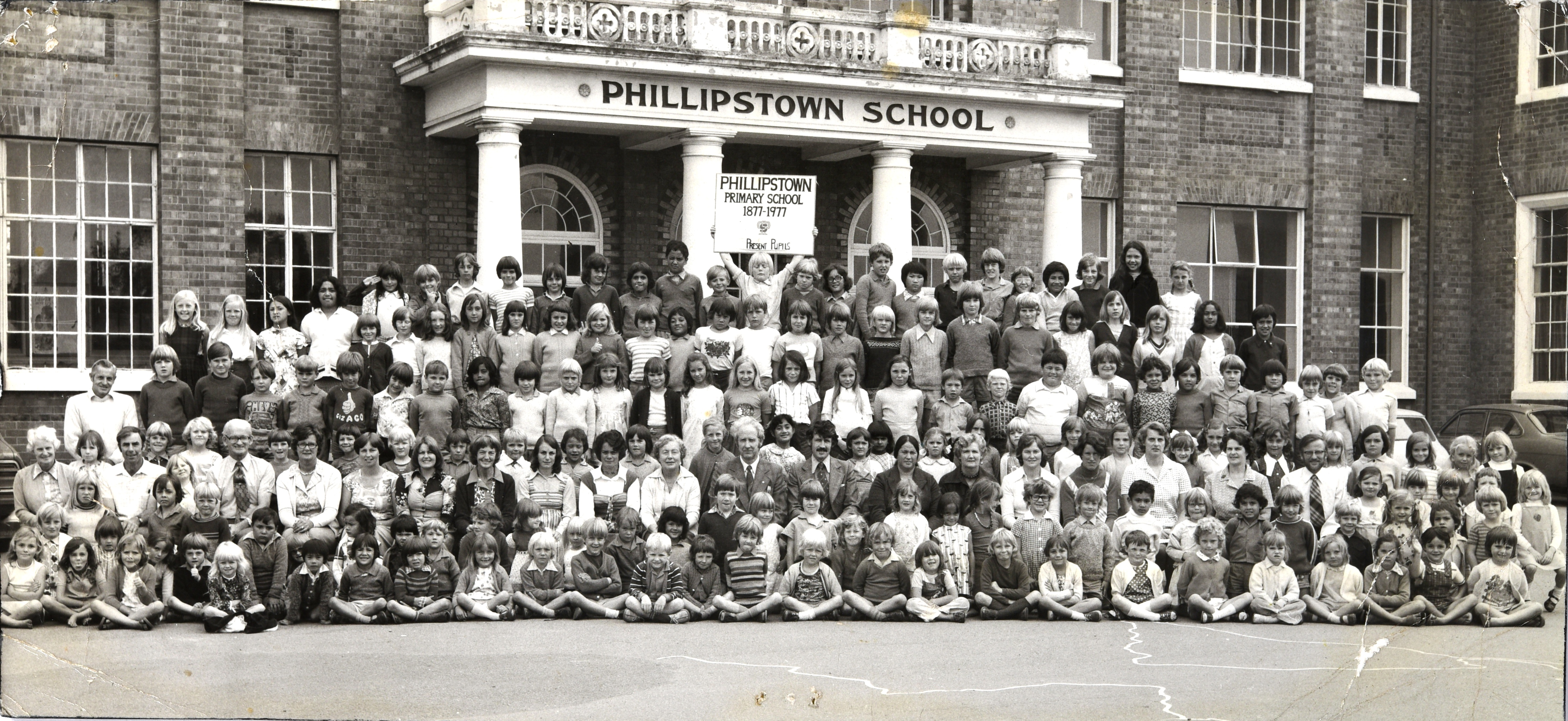
- Phillipstown School in 1977
- Interactive map of Phillipstown
- Coordinates: 43.535°S 172.657°E
- Country: New Zealand
- City: Christchurch
- Local authority: Christchurch City Council
- Electoral ward: Central
- Community board: Waipapa Papanui-Innes-Central

Area
  - Land: 93 ha (230 acres)

Population (June 2025)
  - Total: 4,510
  - Density: 4,800/km^{2} (13,000/sq mi)

	Linwood
Christchurch Central City	Phillipstown
Waltham		Woolston

Phillipstown is a small inner city suburb of the city of Christchurch, New Zealand. It lies south-east of the city centre being bordered by Cashel Street to the north, Aldwins Road to the east, Ferry Road to the south, and Fitzgerald Avenue to the west. Phillipstown contains residential, commercial and industrial activity, and is recognised as a lower socio-economic area.

The Church of the Good Shepherd, a Category I heritage building registered by the New Zealand Historic Places Trust, was located in the suburb until its demolition after the 2011 Christchurch earthquake.

== Demographics ==
Phillipstown covers 0.93 km^{2} (0.36 sq mi). It had an estimated population of 4,510 as of June 2025, with a population density of 4,849 people per km^{2}.

Historical population
Year	Pop.	±% p.a.
2006	3,315	—
2013	3,618	+1.26%
2018	4,014	+2.10%
2023	4,092	+0.39%

Phillipstown had a population of 4,092 in the 2023 New Zealand census, an increase of 78 people (1.9%) since the 2018 census, and an increase of 474 people (13.1%) since the 2013 census. There were 2,121 males, 1,935 females, and 33 people of other genders in 1,782 dwellings. 7.1% of people identified as LGBTIQ+. The median age was 33.6 years (compared with 38.1 years nationally). There were 657 people (16.1%) aged under 15 years, 990 (24.2%) aged 15 to 29, 2,088 (51.0%) aged 30 to 64, and 354 (8.7%) aged 65 or older.

People could identify as more than one ethnicity. The results were 60.9% European (Pākehā); 17.9% Māori; 8.7% Pasifika; 24.2% Asian; 2.1% Middle Eastern, Latin American and African New Zealanders (MELAA); and 2.6% other, which includes people giving their ethnicity as "New Zealander". English was spoken by 94.6%, Māori by 4.4%, Samoan by 2.9%, and other languages by 18.5%. No language could be spoken by 2.8% (e.g. too young to talk). New Zealand Sign Language was known by 1.0%. The percentage of people born overseas was 31.8, compared with 28.8% nationally.

Religious affiliations were 30.5% Christian, 5.9% Hindu, 1.3% Islam, 0.9% Māori religious beliefs, 0.6% Buddhist, 1.0% New Age, and 3.6% other religions. People who answered that they had no religion were 49.0%, and 7.3% of people did not answer the census question.

Of those at least 15 years old, 777 (22.6%) people had a bachelor's or higher degree, 1,596 (46.5%) had a post-high school certificate or diploma, and 1,059 (30.8%) people exclusively held high school qualifications. The median income was $38,400, compared with $41,500 nationally. 114 people (3.3%) earned over $100,000 compared to 12.1% nationally. The employment status of those at least 15 was 1,857 (54.1%) full-time, 390 (11.4%) part-time, and 129 (3.8%) unemployed.

== Education ==
Phillipstown School was a full primary school which opened in 1877. It merged with Woolston School in 2015 to form Te Waka Unua School on the Woolston site.
