= Church of the Good Shepherd, Christchurch =

Church of the Good Shepherd
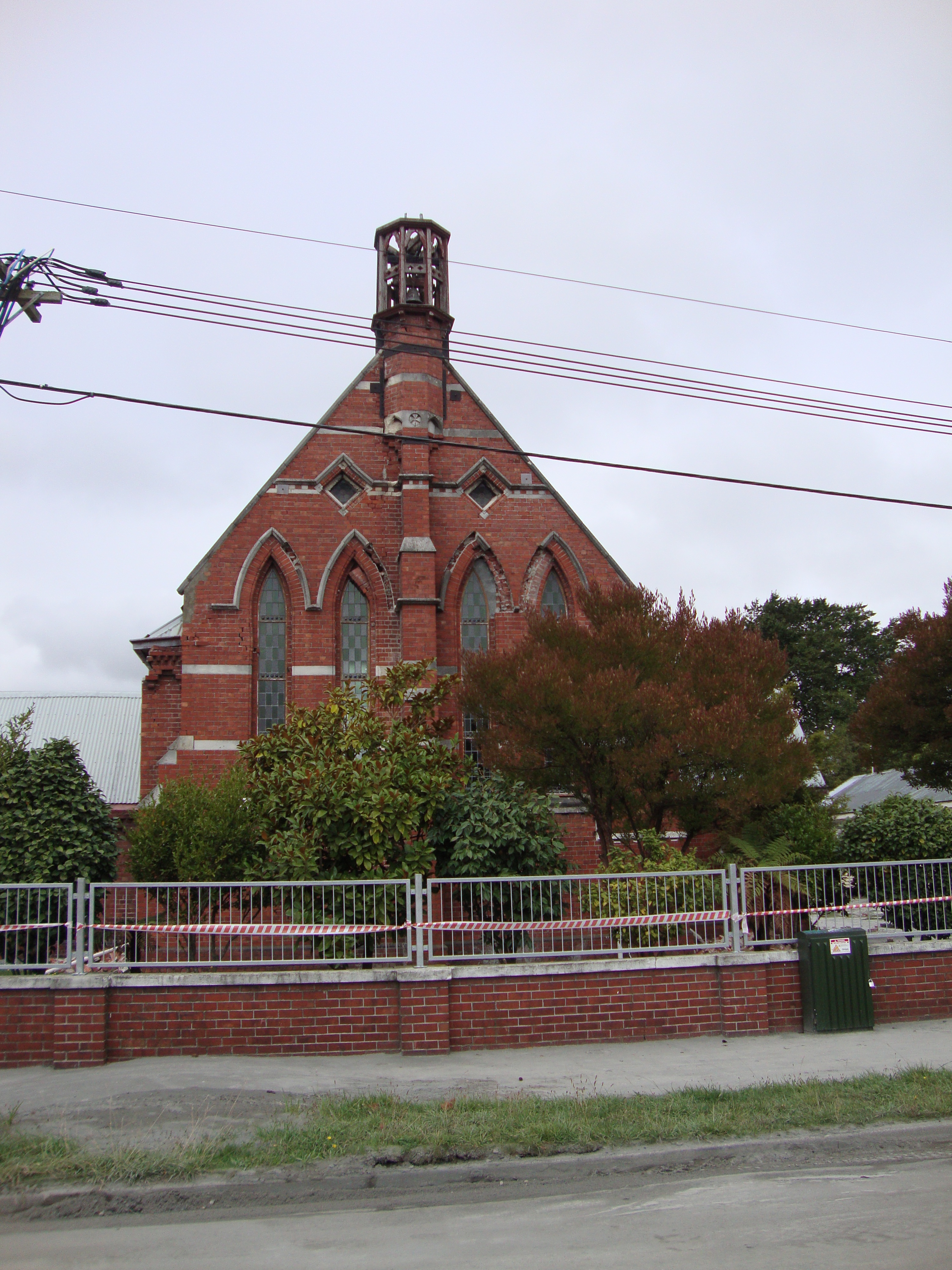
- Church of the Good Shepherd in March 2011
- Church of the Good Shepherd
- 43°32′13″S 172°39′18″E
- Location: Phillipstown, Christchurch
- Country: New Zealand
- Previous denomination: Anglican

History
- Status: Church
- Consecrated: 31 May 1885
- Events: 2011 Christchurch earthquake

Architecture
- Functional status: Demolished (2011)
- Heritage designation: Category I (prior to demolition)
- Designated: 2 April 1985
- Architect: Benjamin Mountfort
- Architectural type: Church
- Style: Gothic Revival
- Completed: 1885
- Demolished: 2011

Specifications
- Materials: Brick

Heritage New Zealand – Category 1
- Designated: 2 April 1985
- Reference no.: 1855

The Church of the Good Shepherd was an Anglican church in Phillipstown, Christchurch, New Zealand. It was demolished following the 2011 Christchurch earthquake.

== History ==
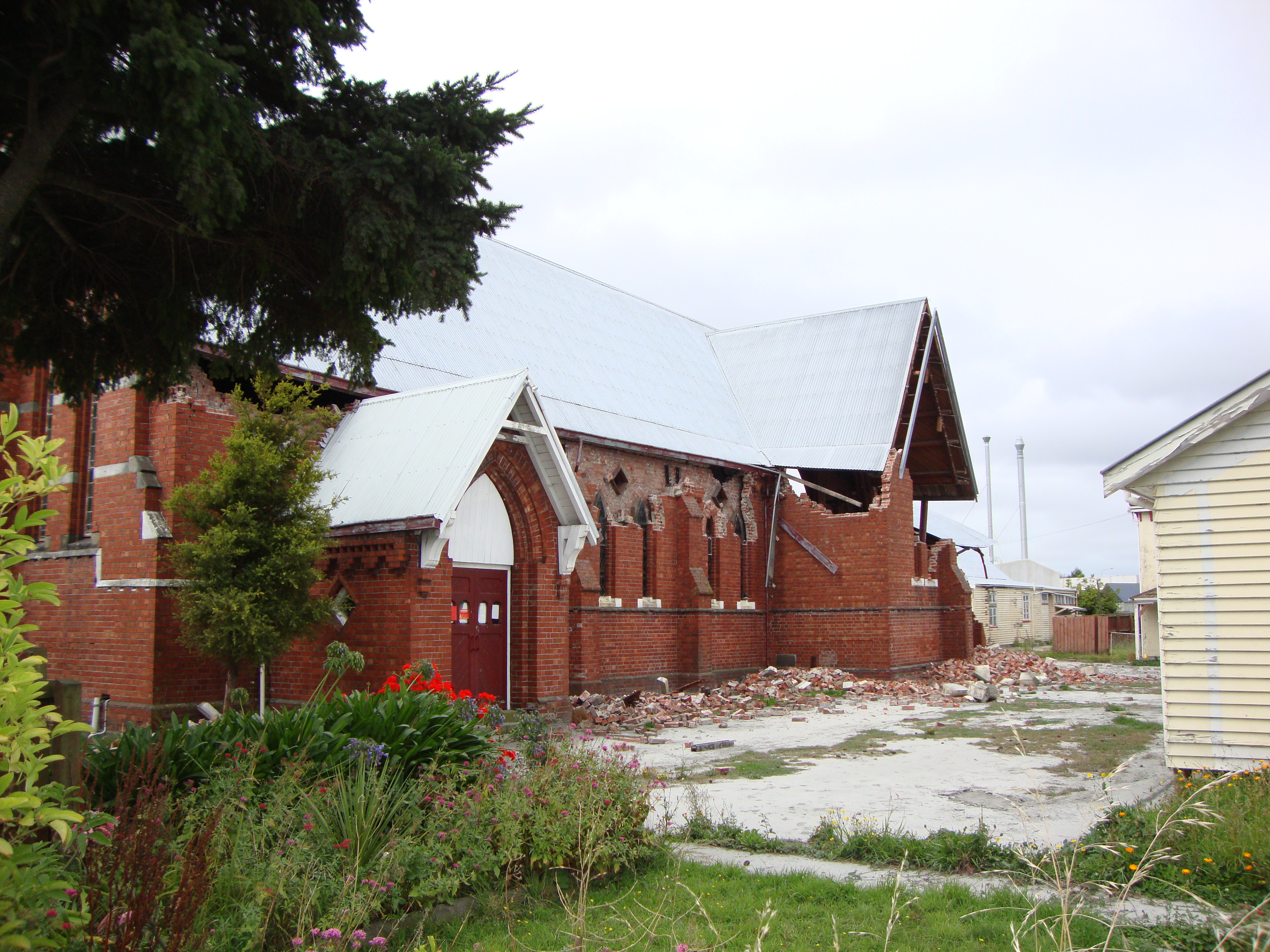
The Church of the Good Shepherd in Phillipstown, Christchurch, after the 22 February 2011 Christchurch earthquake

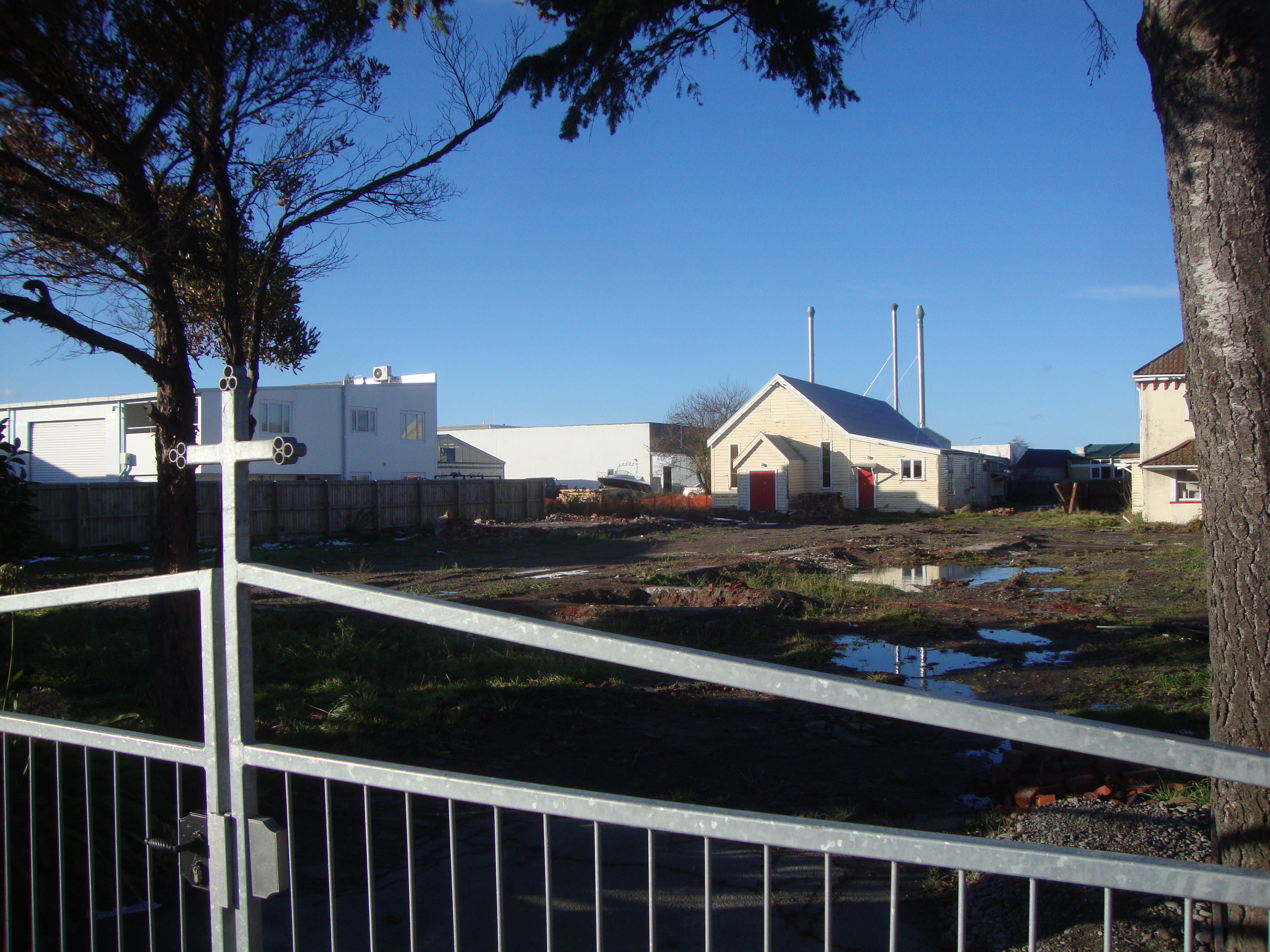
Church of the Good Shepherd after demolition

The vicar of Phillipstown, Rev Hannibal James Congdon Gilbert, an accountant, (James Bowlker), and a storeman, (Lewis Aylwin Carrell), together purchased the land for the church in September 1881 for £380. In March 1883, they onsold the land to the "Church Property Trustees" for a nominal ten shillings. The church, constructed in 1885, was designed in the Gothic Revival style with red brick with contrasting bands of stone, reflecting the contemporary English architectural style A similarly detailed but larger church, St Johns Cathedral, was also designed by Mountfort and built in Napier between 1886 and 1888. That church was destroyed by the 1931 Hawke's Bay earthquake thereby leaving the Church of the Good Shepherd as Mounfort's only surviving brick church.

Mountfort's son, Cyril, oversaw the extension of the church between 1906 and 2007.

Due to an earthquake in September 2010, the church's gables were damaged. Later that month, further damage resulted from vandalism. On 22 February 2011, another earthquake caused major structural and the church was demolished later that year.

== Heritage listing ==
The church had been the last surviving brick church designed by the architect Benjamin Mountfort (1825–1898). On 2 April 1985, it was registered by the New Zealand Historic Places Trust as a Category I historic place, with the registration number 1855.
