= Rolleston =

Rolleston may refer to:

== Places ==
- Rolleston, Queensland, Australia
- Rolleston, Leicestershire, England
- Rolleston, Nottinghamshire, England
  - Rolleston railway station
- Rolleston on Dove, Staffordshire, England
  - Rolleston Hall
- Rolleston, New Zealand
  - Mount Rolleston
  - Rolleston River

== People ==
- Arthur Rolleston (1867–1918), New Zealand cricketer and lawyer
- Boyd Rolleston, fictional character
- Christopher Rolleston (1817–1888), New South Wales public servant
- Frank Rolleston (1873–1946), New Zealand politician
- George Rolleston (1829–1881), English physician and zoologist
- Humphry Rolleston (1862–1944), English physician
- Humphry Rolleston (businessman) (born 1946), New Zealand businessman
- James Rolleston (born 1997), New Zealand actor
- Jeremy Rolleston (born 1972), Australian sportsman
- John Davy Rolleston, (1873–1946), English physician and folklorist
- Sir John Rolleston (British politician) (1848–1919), British Conservative politician
- John Rolleston (New Zealand politician) (1877–1956), New Zealand Member of Parliament
- Lancelot Rolleston (1785–1862), British Conservative Party politician
- Launcelot Rolleston (1737–1802), member of the Markeaton hunt
- Mary Rolleston (1845–1940), New Zealand salon-keeper
- Roger de Rolleston (died 1223), British Catholic priest
- Sam Rolleston, New Zealand rugby league footballer
- Samuel Rolleston, British Anglican priest
- T. W. Rolleston (1857–1920), Irish writer, literary figure and translator
- William Rolleston (1831–1903), New Zealand politician, public administrator, educationalist and Canterbury provincial superintendent
