= John Rolleston (New Zealand politician) =

New Zealand politician

Member of the New Zealand Parliament for Waitomo
- In office 1922–1928
- Preceded by: William Jennings
- Succeeded by: Walter Broadfoot

Personal details
- Born: John Christopher Rolleston; 4 December 1877 Christchurch, New Zealand
- Died: 22 May 1956 (aged 78)
- Relations: Joseph Brittan (grandfather); William Rolleston (father); Mary Rolleston (mother); Frank Rolleston (brother)

John Christopher Rolleston (4 December 1877 – 22 May 1956) was a Reform Party Member of Parliament in New Zealand.

== Early life ==
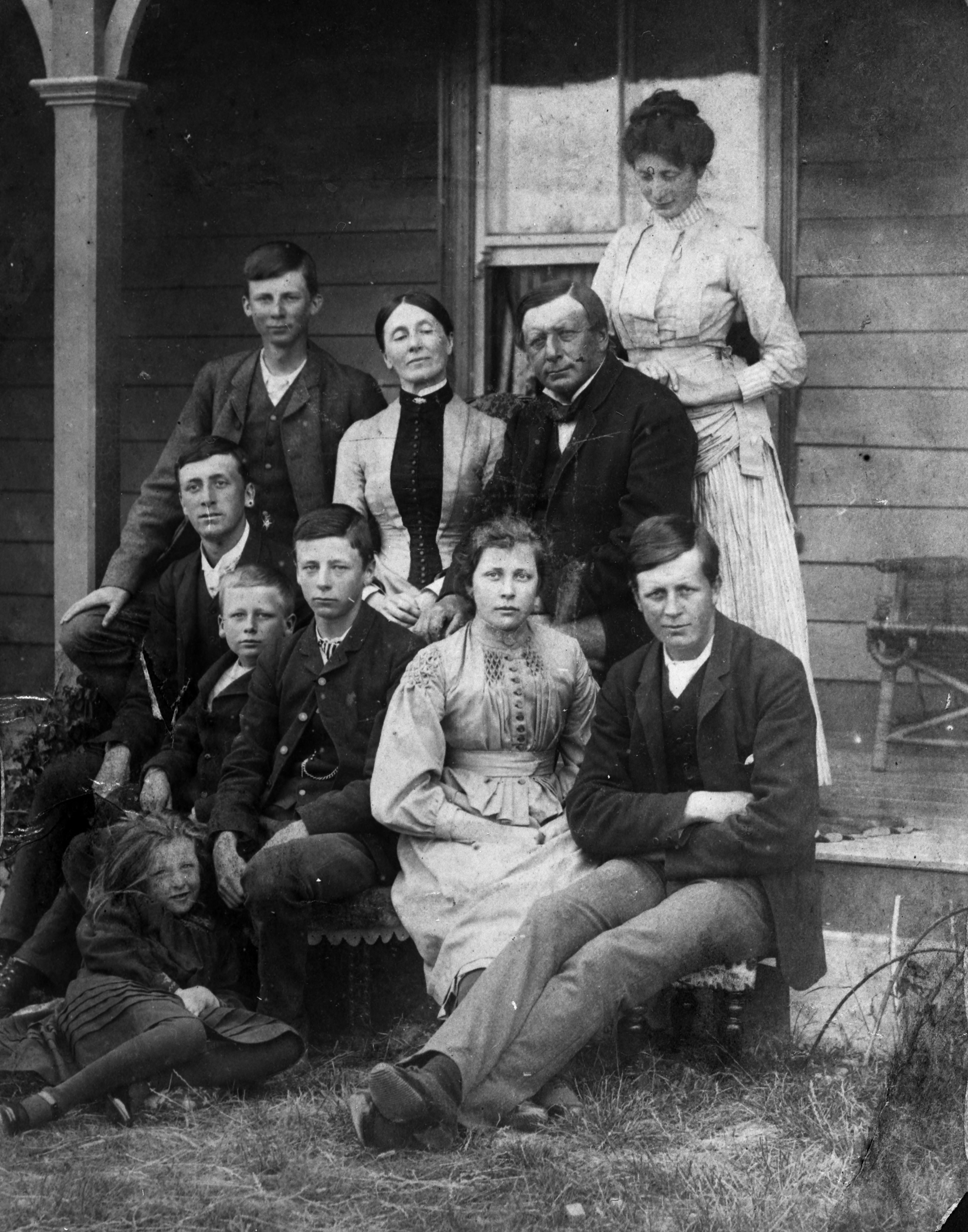
Mary and William Rolleston and their children, at Kapunatiki; John Rolleston sitting in the front row second from the left

Rolleston was born in Christchurch on 4 December 1877, the son of Mary Rolleston. His father, the last Superintendent of the Canterbury Province, William Rolleston was in Wellington for the third session of the 6th Parliament and intended to be home in the second week of December, but it is likely that he will have missed the birth, as his seventh child (of nine in total) was born a week early. At the time of his birth, the family was living at Linwood House. His grandfather was Joseph Brittan (1805–1867).

From 1880 to 1884, the Rolleston family lived in Wellington. William Rolleston held various ministerial posts in ministries led by John Hall (1879–1882), Frederick Whitaker (1882–1883) and Harry Atkinson (1883–1884) and their house in Molesworth Street, on the site that is these days occupied by Saint Paul's Cathedral, gave easy access to the Parliament Buildings. With the defeat of the Atkinson Ministry, William Rolleston lost his ministerial income and due to the effects of the depression of the 1880s, the family moved to William Rolleston's 800 acres (3.2 km^{2}) farm Kapunatiki at the south bank of the Rangitata River near its mouth in 1884.

John Rolleston started farming in Rangitoto around 1908. He served in World War I. He left Lyttelton on 16 October 1914 on board the Tiroa for Egypt as a trooper. He was badly wounded on his left arm in the Gallipoli Campaign.

After the war, he returned to his farm in Rangitoto. On 5 July 1922, he married Agnes Beatrice (Nancy) Johnston of Oruawharo at St. Vincent de Paul's Church in Takapau. They were to have one son (Christopher; d. 1954).

== Political career ==
New Zealand Parliament
Years	Term	Electorate	Party
1922–1925	21st	Waitomo	Reform
1925–1928	22nd	Waitomo	Reform

Rolleston was chosen by the Reform Party to be the candidate in the Waitomo electorate in the 1922 general election. He defeated the incumbent, William Jennings of the Liberal Party, by 3447 to 3441 votes, a majority of only six votes. He was defeated in 1928 by Walter Broadfoot of the United Party. In 1935, he was awarded the King George V Silver Jubilee Medal.

== Death ==
Rolleston died on 22 May 1956.

== Notes ==
New Zealand Parliament
Preceded by William Jennings	Member of Parliament for Waitomo; 1922–1928	Succeeded by Walter Broadfoot
