= Humphry Rolleston (businessman) =

New Zealand businessman

Humphry John Davy Rolleston (born 1946) is a New Zealand businessman, who is a member of the boards of several companies that are listed on the New Zealand Exchange.

Rolleston is descended from William Rolleston (1831–1903), the last Superintendent of the Canterbury Province, who was his great-grandfather, and his wife Mary Rolleston (1845–1940). His grandfather was Frank Rolleston (1873–1946), who represented the Timaru electorate in Parliament for the Reform Party. His parents were George Rolleston (1916–2001), the first dean of the Christchurch School of Medicine, and his wife Marion (née Blackley). He attended Cathedral Grammar School and is married to Debra Graham Rolleston (née Jamieson).

Rolleston was a long-term business partner of Allan Hubbard, the pair having first met in the early 1970s. Rolleston owned a 23% share of the Southbury Group, but sold his share of the business to Hubbard in 2004. Rolleston was a director of Independent Newspapers Limited from 1999 until 2005, when INL merged with Sky Television Network. He has since been on the board of Sky. Other directorships include Broadway Industries, Craigpine Timber, Guthrey Holdings, Infratil, Murray & Co, and Property For Industry. He owns McRaes Engineering, a hydraulics company based in Whangārei with about 65 staff (2012).

Rolleston is a fellow of the Institute of Directors in New Zealand. The Christchurch newspaper The Press listed him 31st on its 2013 power list. The National Business Review put Rolleston onto its 2013 rich list with an estimated wealth of $NZ60m. Rolleston is the chair of the Cathedral Foundation of Cathedral Grammar School.

The Rollestons live in the Christchurch suburb of Fendalton.
