= Frank Rolleston =

New Zealand politician (1873–1946)

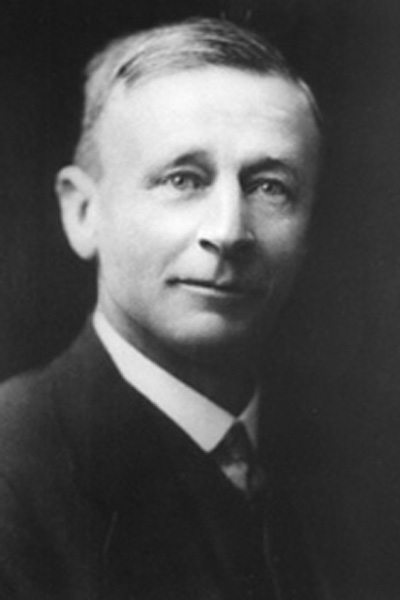
- Frank Rolleston

26th Minister of Justice
- In office 18 January 1926 – 26 November 1928
- Prime Minister: Gordon Coates
- Preceded by: James Parr
- Succeeded by: William Downie Stewart

15th Minister of Defence
- In office 18 January 1926 – 26 November 1928
- Prime Minister: Gordon Coates
- Preceded by: Heaton Rhodes
- Succeeded by: William Downie Stewart

14th Attorney-General
- In office 24 May 1926 – 26 November 1928
- Preceded by: William Downie Stewart
- Succeeded by: Thomas Sidey

Member of the New Zealand Parliament for Timaru
- In office 1922–1928
- Preceded by: James Craigie
- Succeeded by: Clyde Carr

Personal details
- Born: 11 May 1873 Christchurch, New Zealand
- Died: 8 September 1946 (aged 73) Timaru, New Zealand
- Spouse: Mary Rolleston (née Blair)
- Relations: Joseph Brittan (grandfather); William Rolleston (father); Mary Rolleston (mother); John Rolleston (brother); Humphry Rolleston (grandson)

Francis Joseph Rolleston (11 May 1873 – 8 September 1946) was a New Zealand politician of the Reform Party.

== Early life ==
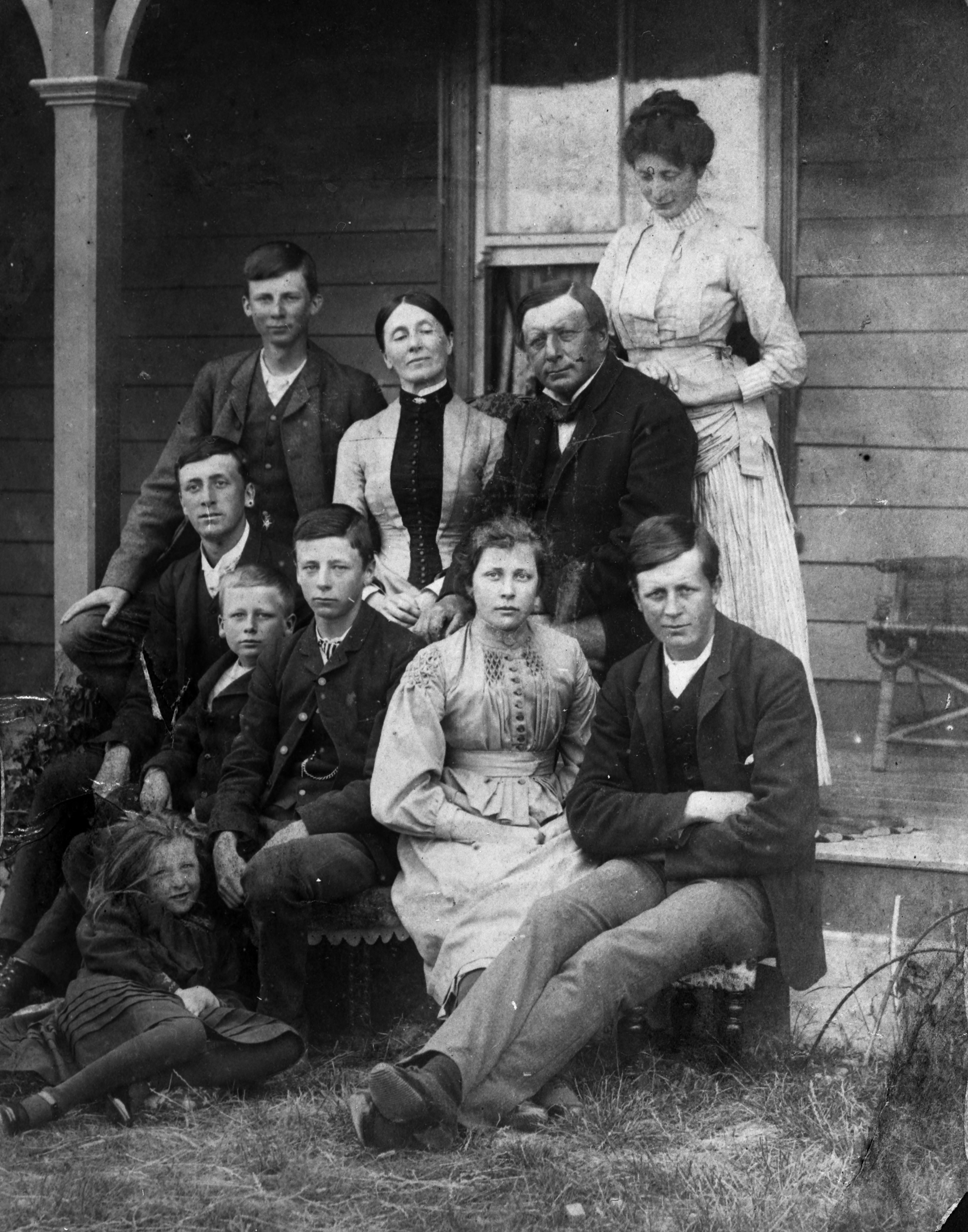
Mary and William Rolleston and their children, at Kapunatiki; Frank Rolleston sitting in the front row in the middle

Rolleston was born in Christchurch in 1873, the son of the last Superintendent of the Canterbury Province, William Rolleston and his wife Mary Rolleston. At the time of his birth, the family was living at Linwood House. His grandfather was Joseph Brittan (1805–1867), who was married to Sophia Brittan (died 1877).

From 1880 to 1884, the Rolleston family lived in Wellington. William Rolleston held various ministerial posts in ministries led by John Hall (1879–1882), Frederick Whitaker (1882–1883) and Harry Atkinson (1883–1884) and their house in Molesworth Street, on the site that is these days occupied by Saint Paul's Cathedral, gave easy access to the Parliament Buildings. With the defeat of the Atkinson Ministry, William Rolleston lost his ministerial income and due to the effects of the depression of the 1880s, the family moved to William Rolleston's 800 acres (3.2 km^{2}) farm Kapunatiki at the south bank of the Rangitata River near its mouth in 1884.

Frank Rolleston was educated at Christ's College, where along with his older three brothers he was a boarder. At one point, Frank Rolleston and the one year older Hector suffered the humiliation of having their school trousers lengthened by some ill-matching material. Later, his older brother Lance (born 1869) was sent to England to finish his medical degree. Frank Rolleston, considered by his father the most able of his boys, was to go to Oxford University, but tight finances prevented this, and Lance Rolleston could only complete his degree with the financial help of his uncle Robert (his father's oldest brother). Instead, Frank Rolleston attended the University of Canterbury, from where he graduated with a BA and LLB.

On 3 March 1908, Rolleston married Mary Winifred Blair in Timaru.

== Political career ==
New Zealand Parliament
Years	Term	Electorate	Party
1922–1925	21st	Timaru	Reform
1925–1928	22nd	Timaru	Reform

Rolleston first stood for Parliament in the 1905 election in the Timaru electorate. Whilst he "put up an excellent fight" against William Hall-Jones, the incumbent Hall-Jones obtained 3479 votes versus 2432 votes for Rolleston.

He represented the Timaru electorate from 1922, when he defeated, with a majority of 282 votes, Percy Vinnell of the Labour Party. Rolleston and Vinnell contested the 1925 election, when Rolleston obtained a much increased majority of 2486 votes. Rolleston lost the 1928 election against Rev Clyde Carr of the Labour Party, who would go on and represent the electorate until 1962.

Rolleston was a Cabinet minister, being the Minister of Defence, Minister of Justice and Attorney-General from 1926 to 1928 in the Reform Government of New Zealand.

His brother John was also elected to Parliament in 1922 (representing Waitomo) and was also defeated in 1928.

Frank Rolleston was Mayor of Timaru from 1921 to 1923.

== Awards and death ==
Rolleston was awarded the King George V Silver Jubilee Medal in 1935, and the King George VI Coronation Medal in 1937. He died on 8 September 1946 in Timaru.

== Notes ==
Political offices
Preceded by James Parr	Minister of Justice; 1926–1928	Succeeded by William Downie Stewart
Preceded by James Parr	Minister of Police; 1926–1928	Succeeded by William Downie Stewart
Preceded by Heaton Rhodes	Minister of Defence; 1926–1928	Succeeded by William Downie Stewart
Preceded by William Downie Stewart	Attorney-General; 1926–1928	Succeeded by Thomas Sidey
New Zealand Parliament
Preceded by James Craigie	Member of Parliament for Timaru; 1922–1928	Succeeded by Clyde Carr
