= Linwood, New Zealand =

Suburb of Christchurch, New Zealand

Linwood
- Suburb
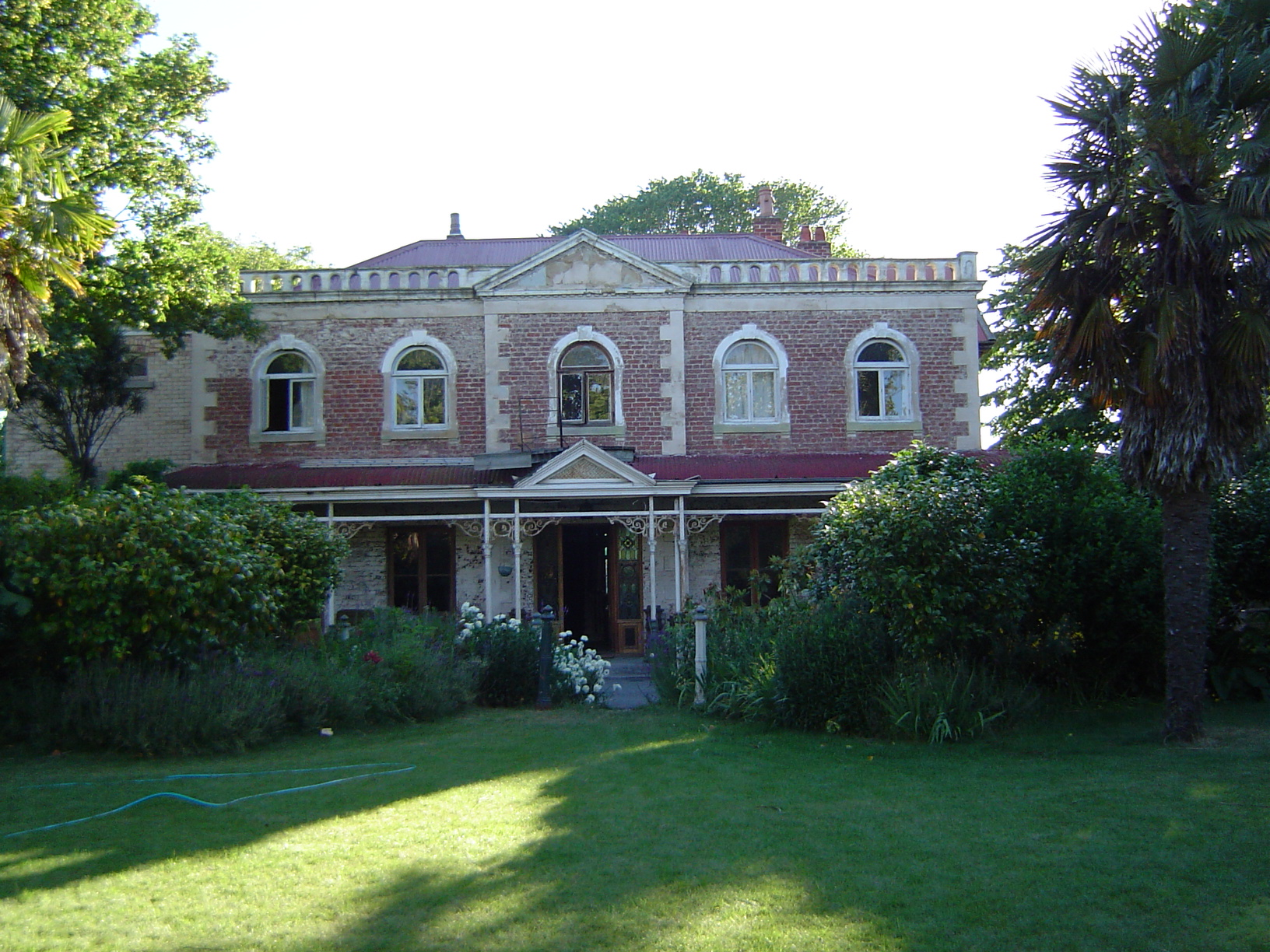
- Linwood House in 2003
- Interactive map of Linwood
- Coordinates: 43°31′53″S 172°40′21″E
- Country: New Zealand
- City: Christchurch
- Local authority: Christchurch City Council
- Electoral ward: Central; Linwood
- Community board: Waitai Coastal-Burwood-Linwood; Waipapa Papanui-Innes-Central
- Established: 1850s

Area
  - Land: 285 ha (700 acres)

Population (June 2025)
  - Total: 10,920
  - Density: 3,830/km^{2} (9,920/sq mi)

Richmond	Avonside	Wainoni
Christchurch Central City	Linwood
Phillipstown	Woolston	Bromley

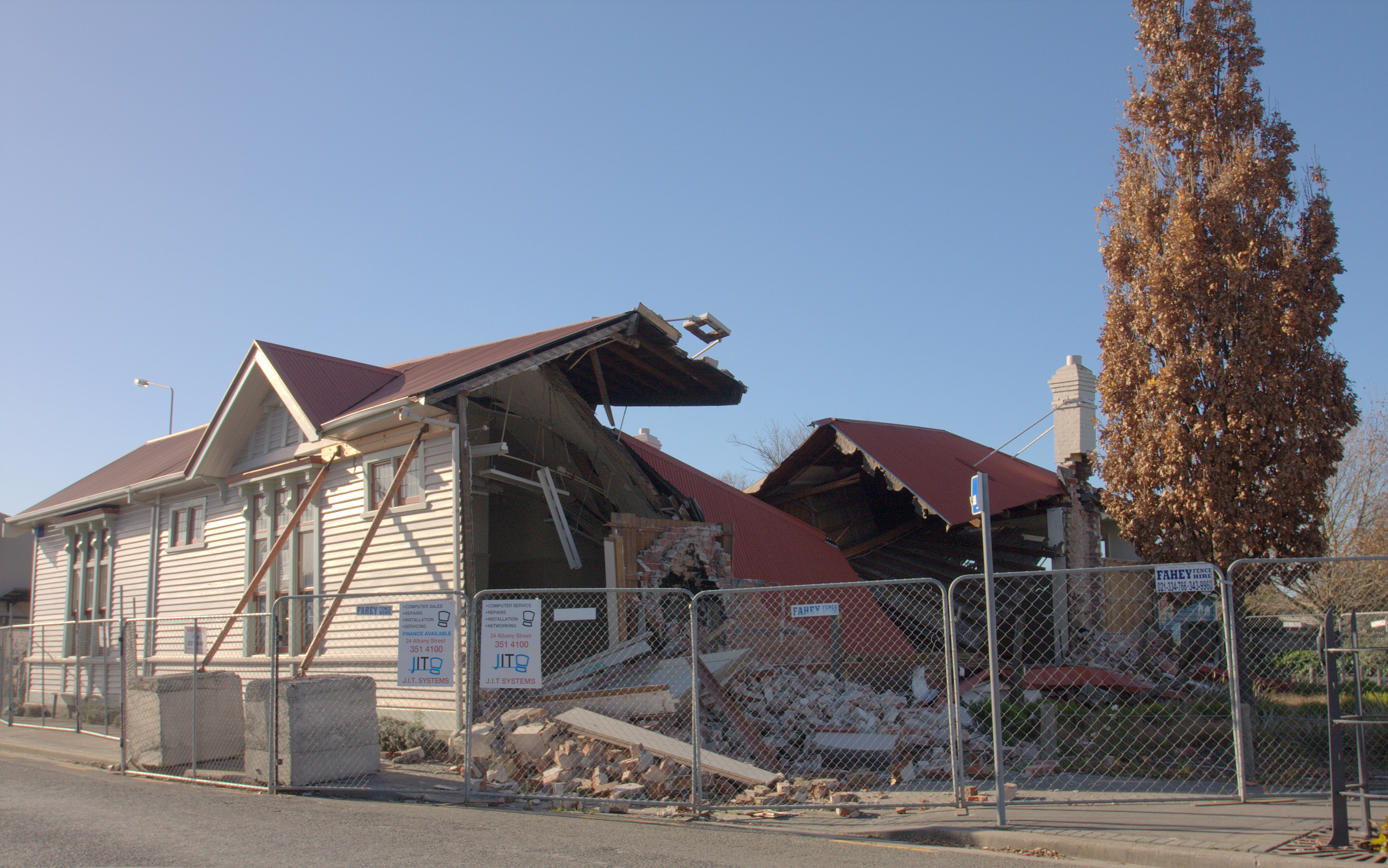
Linwood Community Centre and Art Gallery with the back collapsed by the February 2011 earthquake

Linwood is an inner suburb of the city of Christchurch, New Zealand. It lies to the east of the city centre, mostly between Ferry Road and Linwood Avenue, two of the major arterial roads to the eastern suburbs of Christchurch. It is one of the city's older suburbs, established in 1850.

== History ==
Linwood is one of Christchurch's older suburbs which was established in 1850. "Linwood" was given its name by Joseph Brittan, who purchased rural section 300 in Avonside. The adjoining rural section 301 was to be part of the farm, but the right was sold but probably farmed with rural section 300 and was eventually bought back by his son in 1874. To this was added a small part of section 30 to give access in 1855 and 21-year lease for the adjoining sections in 1862 giving a total area of about 380 acres (about 150ha). He called the farm Linwood, as he was from Linwood, Hampshire. Brittan built Linwood House at 30 Linwood Avenue in 1857, which stood there until demolition following the February 2011 Christchurch earthquake.

Christchurch lacked an accessible port before the construction of the Lyttelton Rail Tunnel in 1867. This posed a significant problem for the fledgling city. A barge service along what is now Linwood Avenue was mooted prior to this tunnel but was never completed.

The Linwood Islamic Centre was the site of a mass shooting during the Christchurch mosque shootings on 15 March 2019.

== Demographics ==
Linwood covers 2.85 km^{2} (1.10 sq mi). It had an estimated population of 10,920 as of June 2025, with a population density of 3,832 people per km^{2}.

Historical population
Year	Pop.	±% p.a.
2006	9,015	—
2013	8,625	−0.63%
2018	9,786	+2.56%
2023	9,954	+0.34%

Linwood had a population of 9,954 in the 2023 New Zealand census, an increase of 168 people (1.7%) since the 2018 census, and an increase of 1,329 people (15.4%) since the 2013 census. There were 5,070 males, 4,803 females, and 78 people of other genders in 4,167 dwellings. 6.3% of people identified as LGBTIQ+. The median age was 35.0 years (compared with 38.1 years nationally). There were 1,596 people (16.0%) aged under 15 years, 2,340 (23.5%) aged 15 to 29, 4,824 (48.5%) aged 30 to 64, and 1,197 (12.0%) aged 65 or older.

People could identify as more than one ethnicity. The results were 64.8% European (Pākehā); 17.8% Māori; 8.3% Pasifika; 21.3% Asian; 2.0% Middle Eastern, Latin American and African New Zealanders (MELAA); and 2.5% other, which includes people giving their ethnicity as "New Zealander". English was spoken by 95.1%, Māori by 4.6%, Samoan by 3.0%, and other languages by 17.3%. No language could be spoken by 2.4% (e.g. too young to talk). New Zealand Sign Language was known by 0.8%. The percentage of people born overseas was 30.6, compared with 28.8% nationally.

Religious affiliations were 28.6% Christian, 5.3% Hindu, 2.2% Islam, 1.2% Māori religious beliefs, 1.1% Buddhist, 0.8% New Age, 0.1% Jewish, and 3.3% other religions. People who answered that they had no religion were 50.8%, and 6.7% of people did not answer the census question.

Of those at least 15 years old, 1,689 (20.2%) people had a bachelor's or higher degree, 4,062 (48.6%) had a post-high school certificate or diploma, and 2,604 (31.2%) people exclusively held high school qualifications. The median income was $37,200, compared with $41,500 nationally. 321 people (3.8%) earned over $100,000 compared to 12.1% nationally. The employment status of those at least 15 was 4,323 (51.7%) full-time, 1,017 (12.2%) part-time, and 315 (3.8%) unemployed.

Individual statistical areas
Name	Area (km^{2})	Population	Density (per km^{2})	Dwellings	Median age	Median income
Stanmore	0.42	2,082	4,957	969	33.4 years	$40,900
Linwood Central	0.65	2,934	4,514	1,332	34.6 years	$36,800
Linwood North	0.86	2,778	3,230	1,083	36.6 years	$37,200
Linwood East	0.91	2,160	2,374	783	35.9 years	$33,700
New Zealand					38.1 years	$41,500

== Economy ==
=== Retail ===
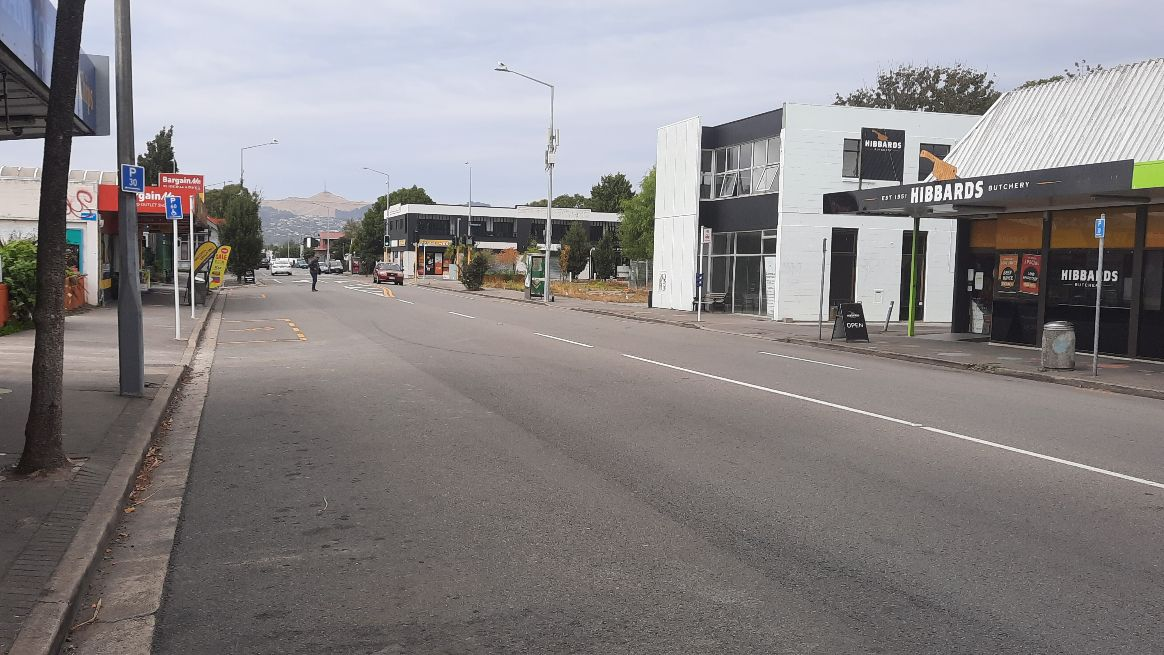
Linwood Village on Stanmore Road

A long established retail section is on Stanmore Road around the intersections with Gloucester and Worcester Streets. It underwent significant upgrading in the 2020s and has been described as an urban village.

Linwood's main commercial area is located around the intersection of Linwood Avenue, Aldwins Road and Buckleys Road. There is also a shopping mall in the suburb, known as Eastgate Mall (formerly Linwood City) that contains a Christchurch City Council community centre and a library. It covers an area of 30,500 m^{2}. It is a two level shopping mall but used to encompass a much larger area prior to the 22 February 2011 earthquake. The mall has 1100 carparks and 37 shops, including The Warehouse, Woolworths, Warehouse Stationery, Number One Shoes and Lincraft.

== Parks ==
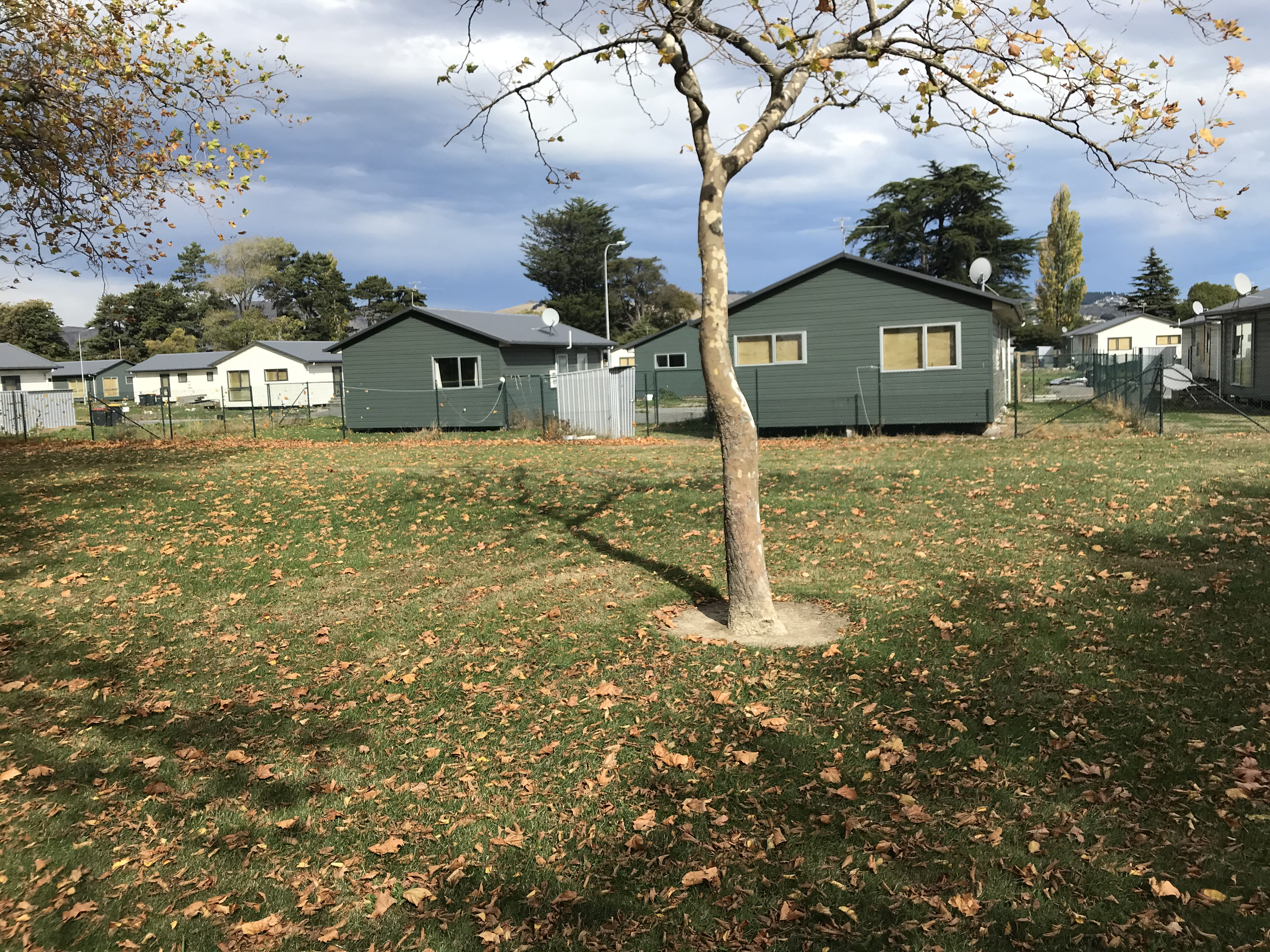
Linwood Park Village

The largest parks in Linwood are Bromley Park and the adjacent Linwood Cemetery, followed by Beverley Park and the North Linwood Community Park. As there are no defined suburb boundaries in Christchurch, post code boundaries are sometimes used for suburb boundaries (e.g. by Google Maps). According to Google Maps, most of Woodham Park is located in Linwood whilst only part of Linwood Park belongs to the eponymous suburb. Most commonly, Aldwins Road and Linwood Avenue are considered the boundary roads of Woolston and if so, Linwood Park is located in Woolston.

== Education ==
Te Aratai College is a secondary school for years 7 to 13. It has a roll of 1,260. The school opened in 1954.

Te Pā o Rākaihautū is a Kura Kaupapa Māori composite school which teaches years 1 to 13 in the Māori language. It has a roll of 207. It was founded in 2015.

Linwood Avenue Primary School and Whītau School are contributing primary schools for years 1 to 6, with rolls of 337 and 295 students, respectively. Linwood Avenue opened in 1928, and Whītau opened in 1908 as Linwood North School.

All of these are coeducational state schools. Rolls are as of July 2026.

== Notable people ==
- Lianne Dalziel (born 1960), former Mayor of Christchurch from 2013–2022.
