= Arthur Rolleston =

New Zealand cricketer and lawyer (1867–1918)

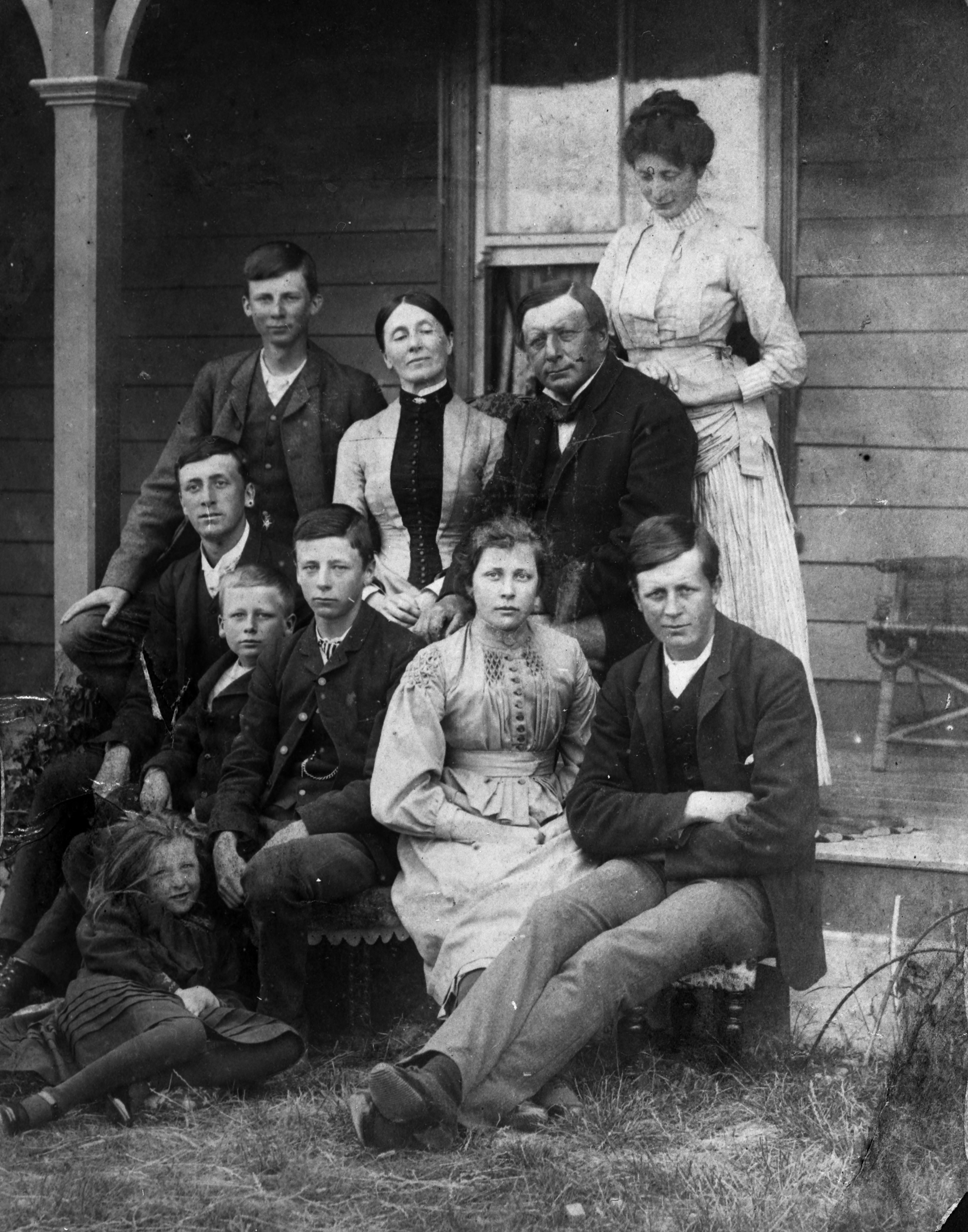
Mary and William Rolleston and their children in 1888; Arthur Rolleston is seated at left

Arthur Cecil Rolleston (13 December 1867 – 28 September 1918) was a New Zealand cricketer and lawyer who played two matches of first-class cricket for Canterbury in 1890 and 1891.

== Life and career ==
One of the sons of the prominent New Zealand politician William Rolleston, and a grandson of the Christchurch pioneer Joseph Brittan, Arthur Rolleston was educated in Christchurch at Christ's College (1878–1886) and Canterbury College. In 1884, he was senior Somes Scholar. He was admitted as a solicitor in 1891 and as a barrister in 1900. On 14 August 1899 at St Luke's Church in Christchurch, he married Ruby Mildred Buckley, the youngest daughter of George Buckley. The explorer George Buckley thus became his brother-in-law.

Described by a contemporary newspaper as a "very dashing left-handed bat", Arthur Rolleston had little success in his brief first-class career, totalling only 16 runs in his two matches. However, his score of 9 not out in his second match was the top score in Canterbury's first innings of 50.

Rolleston worked as a lawyer, mostly in Christchurch but also later in the Chatham Islands. He died aged 50 after striking his head when he fell in the street while visiting Wellington. At the time of his death, his wife had been living in England for some time.
