= Linwood House =

New Zealand historic building

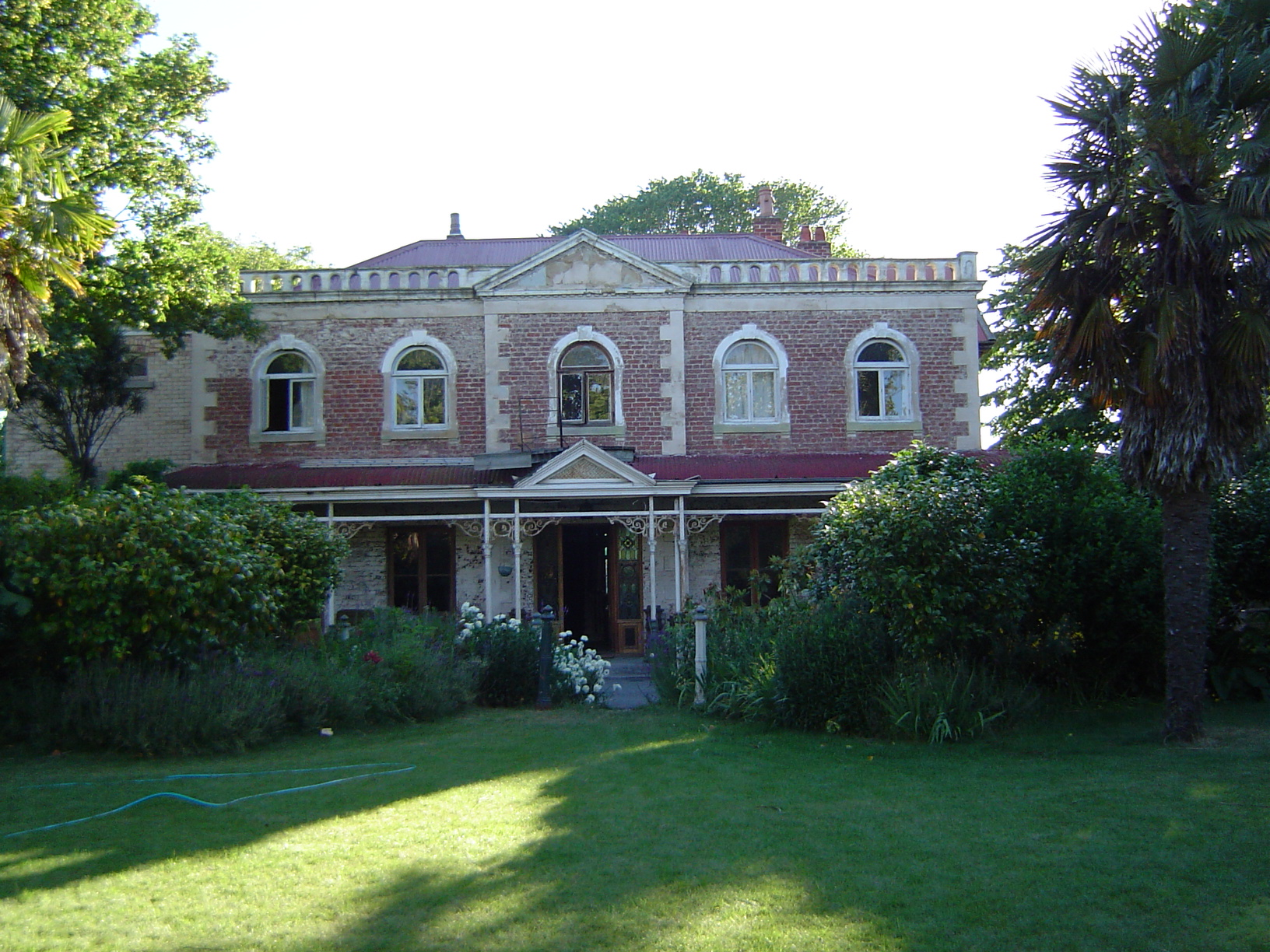
- Linwood House in 2003
- Interactive map of the Linwood House area

General information
- Architectural style: late Georgian- / Regency-style house
- Location: Linwood, 30 Linwood Avenue, Christchurch, New Zealand
- Coordinates: 43°31′35.82″S 172°39′41.25″E
- Completed: 1857
- Renovated: 1889; 1920
- Demolished: 2011
- Client: Joseph Brittan

Technical details
- Structural system: unreinforced masonry
- Floor count: two

Design and construction
- Architect: Charles Fooks

Renovating team
- Architects: John Whitelaw (1889); Luttrell Brothers (1920)

Website
- Official website

Heritage New Zealand – Category 2
- Official name: Linwood House
- Designated: 17 August 1982
- Reference no.: 3119

References
- New Zealand Historic Places Trust (30 May 2005), Registration Report, Christchurch: New Zealand Historic Places Trust

Linwood House was built as the homestead for Joseph Brittan, who, as surgeon, newspaper editor and provincial councillor, was one of the dominant figures in early Christchurch, New Zealand. The suburb of Linwood was named after Brittan's farm and homestead. Brittan's daughter Mary married William Rolleston, and they lived at Linwood House following Joseph Brittan's death. During that time, Rolleston was the 4th (and last) Superintendent of the Canterbury Province, and Linwood House served for many important political and public functions.

The property went through many changes in ownership. Land was successively subdivided; at its peak, 110 acres (450,000 m^{2}) of land belonged to Linwood House, of which only 2,013 m^{2} (21,670 sq ft) remain. For some years, Linwood House was used as a private day and boarding school for girls. The house declined during the mid-20th century, was used for flats for several decades, and was in 1985 described by an historian as the "city's worst example of a house which should be preserved being left to decay". The house's fortunes improved when it was purchased in 1988 by people sympathetic to heritage. Gradually being restored, Linwood House suffered significant damage in the 2010 Canterbury earthquake and partially collapsed in the 2011 Christchurch earthquake. Civil Defence ordered the building's demolition, which was carried out in the second half of 2011.

Architecturally, Linwood House was a rare example of a late Georgian- / Regency-style house in Canterbury. It had historical importance as one of the oldest surviving houses in Christchurch. The building's association with Joseph Brittan and especially William Rolleston made it socially important.

== Geography ==
Linwood House was located at 30 Linwood Avenue in Linwood, Christchurch. Originally located on 50 acres (20 ha) of rural section (RS) 300, and after the adjacent RS 301 was added, the total size of the land holding was 110 acres (45 ha). After numerous subdivisions, the size of the section was 2,013 m^{2} (21,670 sq ft). The Christchurch suburb of Linwood was named after Brittan's farm and homestead.

== History and ownership ==
=== Joseph Brittan (1857–1867) ===
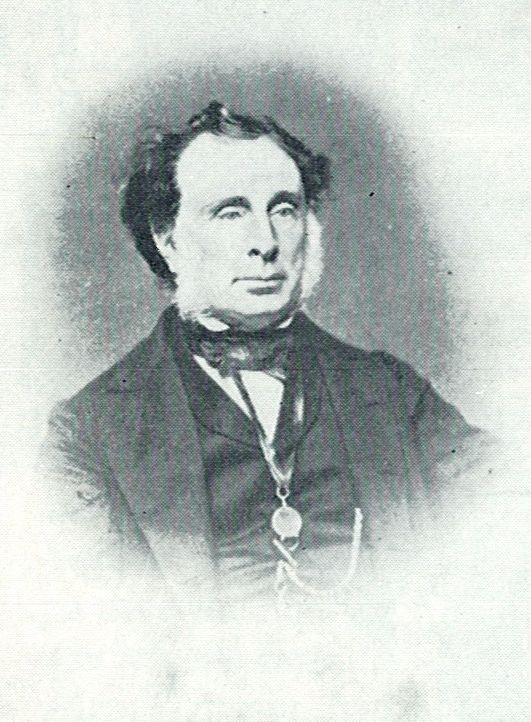
Portrait of Joseph Brittan

Brothers Guise and Joseph Brittan, and their friend Charles Fooks had in common that they all married one of the four Chandler daughters. The Brittans were surgeons, whilst Fooks was an architect. Guise Brittan held a role of responsibility for the Canterbury Association, and he came to Christchurch on Sir George Seymour in December 1850, and his wife and four children travelled with him. Fooks went with them, but left his family behind in England.

Joseph Brittan's wife Elizabeth Mary had died in 1849. He remarried in a manner that was illegal at the time, socially unacceptable and causing a scandal—he took Elizabeth's sister Sophia, the fourth Chandler daughter, as his second wife. The newly-weds reacted to the scandal in a way that was not unusual at the time; they left their problems behind and emigrated, which they did a month after the ceremony. They sailed for Christchurch on the William Hyde, which left Deal, Kent on 21 October 1851 and arrived in Lyttelton on 5 February 1852. Mrs Fooks and her two daughters came to New Zealand with Joseph Brittan's family. By mid-1852, Joseph Brittan purchased RS 300, comprising rural land about 2 kilometres (1.2 mi) east of Cathedral Square.

In 1855/56, Guise Brittan had Englefield Lodge built on land alongside the Avon River just outside the initial town area (these days the area to the east of Fitzgerald Avenue). Joseph Brittan chose land a short distance downstream along the Avon River and had his homestead, Linwood House, built in 1857. Fooks was the architect for Linwood House, and, based on an assessment by art historian Dr Ian Lochhead, it is likely that he also designed Englefield Lodge. Joseph Brittan called his property and farm Linwood after his home in Linwood, Hampshire.

Joseph Brittan had varied interests and immediately upon arrival in Christchurch, joined others in various activities. He played cricket in Hagley Park within a fortnight of reaching Christchurch, and later helped improve the grounds and raised money for fencing the area. He was into horse racing, later bred horses, and Canterbury's first steeplechase was held on his Linwood farm. The Brittans were into music and his wife Sophia Brittan brought her piano from England. Joseph Brittan had a portable harmonium and as in the early years, Lyttelton was culturally more important than Christchurch, he joined a musical group in the port town. For performances, he walked over the Bridle Path with the instrument strapped to his back. Musical evenings were also held at the Brittan home.

About halfway between Englefield and Linwood was Holy Trinity Avonside, at the time a cob church. Guise Brittan was its churchwarden. The whole Brittan family had a close connection to the church, with Joseph Brittan helping to raise money for its construction, and his daughter Mary singing in the church choir. They faithfully attended church on Sundays.

Tragedy struck on 1 January 1862, when his son Arthur drowned in the Avon River while learning to swim. He got entangled in watercress, which the Brittans themselves had introduced to the Avon, and his body was only found after a good half-hour. Arthur had left school by then and was helping his father on the farm. Joseph Brittan was heartbroken and signs were that he had a period of depression. Soon after the drowning, he advertised for both a dairyman and a farmworker. He even put Linwood House up for sale, but no property transaction was recorded.

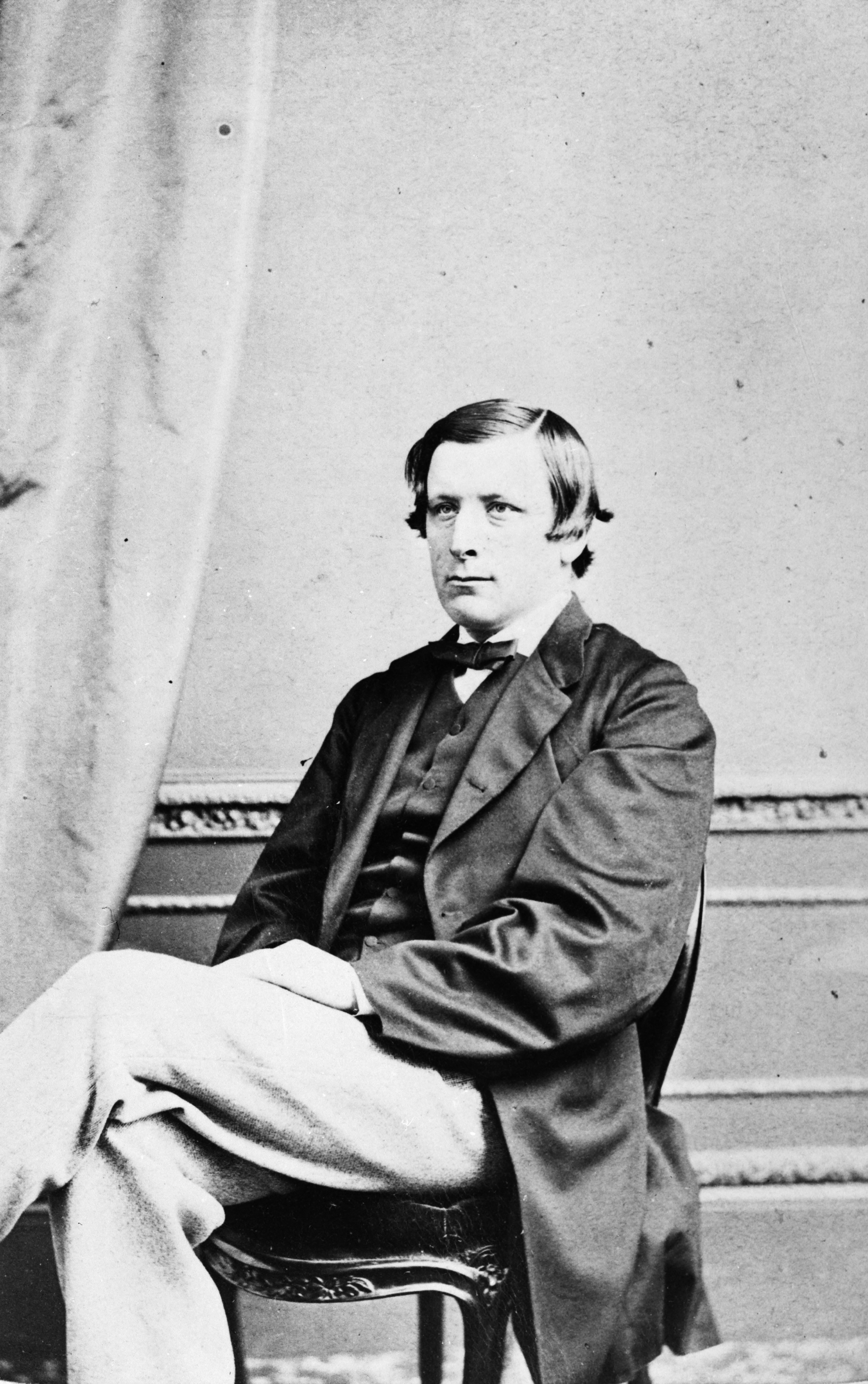
William Rolleston in 1870

William Rolleston, at the time Provincial Secretary, proposed to Mary Brittan in early 1865. He was 34 at the time, and she was 19. Both Joseph and Sophia Brittan were opposed to a marriage, which is surprising, given that Rolleston was intelligent, well educated, successful and, if anything, of higher social standing. They thought him too old for their daughter, her too young to marry. Maybe Sophia Brittan did not want to lose her daughter, who was in effect running the household and entertained guests, as she was often too ill to look after these tasks herself. But Rolleston was offered and accepted the role of Under Secretary for Native Affairs, which required moving to Wellington. Hence, the wedding went ahead on 24 May 1865 at Avonside Trinity Church, before the newly-weds moved to the capital.

Joseph Brittan's health declined during 1867. Of distress for the family were the financial affairs, with various debts that only Joseph knew about. Rolleston tried to give financial advice to both Sophia and her son Frank, but he was ignored. Joseph Brittan died on 27 October 1867 at Linwood House.

Brittan Street in Linwood, named after Joseph Brittan, first appeared in street directories in 1892. Today, the Linwood House section fronts onto both Linwood Avenue and Brittan Street.

=== Sophia Brittan (1867–1877) ===
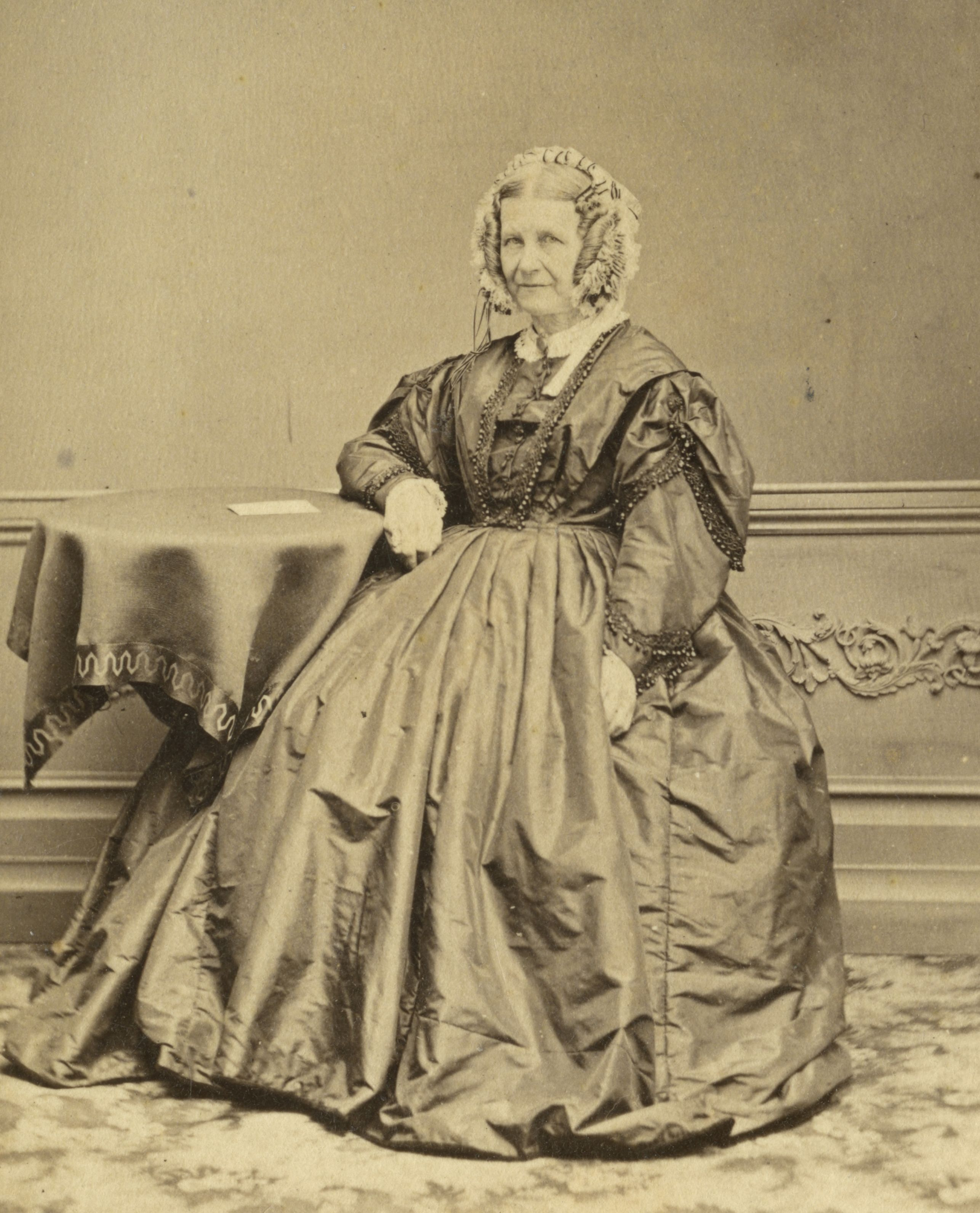
Sophia Brittan in 1872

Sophia Brittan inherited the house and land from her late husband. Initially, it was left to her son Frank to run the farm. In 1868, there were rumours that William Sefton Moorhouse would resign as Canterbury Superintendent, and Rolleston was encouraged to make himself available. He returned to Christchurch, whilst his wife Mary and their two children remained in Wellington. Rolleston was elected unopposed on 22 May 1868. And on 8 June, he was elected to Parliament in the 1868 by-election in the Avon electorate. Late in 1868, the Rollestons moved back to Christchurch to live at Linwood House. This was a delicate affair, as this made conditions cramped (Sophia, her sons Joe and Frank, the Rollestons with their two children, plus servants made for cramped living in the eight rooms), and there has always been tension between William Rolleston and Frank Brittan. Mary Rolleston arranged for her oldest brother Joe, who had some disability, to live with his aunt, Mrs Fooks. Charles Fooks was imprisoned at that time, and it was good for Mrs Fooks to have a male live with her. The Rollestons paid rent, which helped Sophia Brittan service the mortgage. With Rolleston Superintendent until the abolition of Provincial Government at the end of 1876, Linwood House hosted many important social and political functions.

Linwood farm was used for sporting events. In July 1876, the Christchurch rugby team met their South Canterbury counterparts from Timaru (Christchurch won the game), and in May 1877, the Canterbury Hunt Club met for a steeplechase in the sand hills of the farm.

=== Frank Brittan (1877–1889) ===
Sophia Brittan died in August 1877. Whilst the Rollestons had carried the Brittan family financially over the last decade, their contributions went practically unrecognised. Mary Rolleston inherited £400 and the piano, her oldest brother received an annual annuity of £20, and Frank Brittan was given the farm, the house and all its contents. William Rolleston was "shocked, hurt and astonished" by the unfairness of this distribution. Contact between the Rollestons and Frank Brittan all but ceased. Much later in life, Mary Rolleston would see her brother briefly once a year on New Year's Day at his home, and that was all the contact that they had.

In May 1878, Frank Brittan sold 58 acres (23 ha) of land subdivided into 231 sections for a total of £18,489. He made a handsome profit, as much of the land was purchased three years earlier for £49 per hectare, and he sold the land for some £318 per acre (£127 per ha). Linwood Estate was located east of Stanmore Road, and comprised the extensions of Cashel, Hereford, and Worcester Streets. At the same auction, Brittan sold all his stock and farming implements, as he had bought Kelsie Estate in Selwyn County. Further subdivision followed in 1886.

=== Edward Hiorns (1889–1912) ===
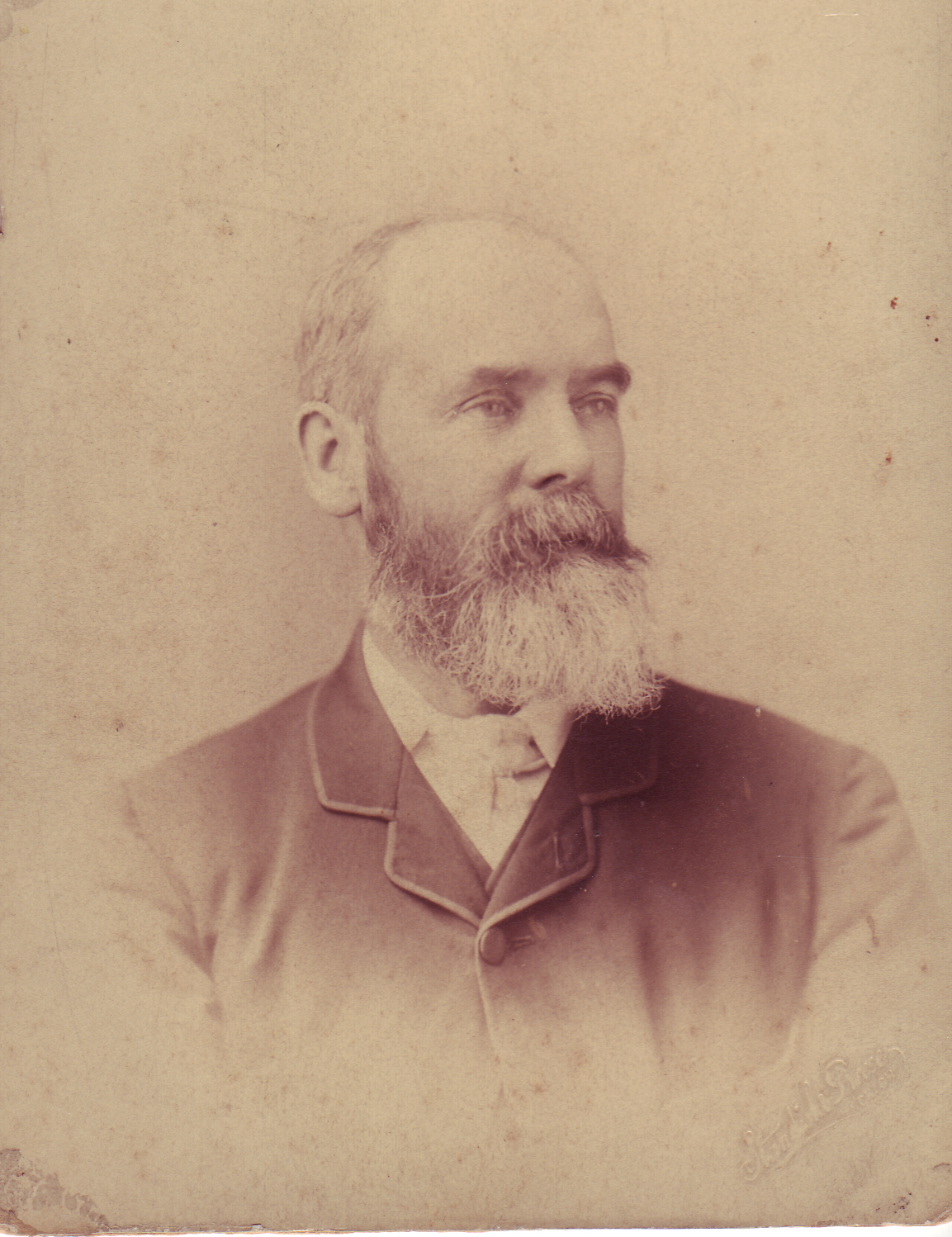
Edward Hiorns

Edward Hiorns (1838 – 7 July 1912) emigrated in 1862 from England. Originally a plumber and tinsmith, he became a hotelier. From 1881 to 1883, he was a member of Christchurch City Council, and later stood for office on the Linwood Borough Council. Hiorns was Masonic Grand Master of New Zealand, and attended the 1897 Queen Victoria Golden Jubilee in England in that capacity.

Frank Brittan sold Linwood House to Hiorns in 1889, who commissioned architect John Whitelaw to design an extension. This resulted in a drawing room, a billiard room and a study to be added to the house. In 1898, Hiorns leased Linwood House to Sir John Denniston for five years. Hiorns had retired from business and spent some of his time in Sydney. Denniston, the oldest son of Thomas Denniston and married to the daughter of John Bathgate, was a judge at the Supreme Court in Christchurch.

After Denniston had moved out, Hiorns carried out further subdivisions in 1903 and 1905. For a time, Linwood House was reputedly leased to Alexander Boyle. He was one of the founders of Pyne and Co, which later became Pyne Gould Guinness, of which Boyle was chairman of the board.

In September 1903, Helen McKee and her mother relocated their boarding and day school for girls, Avonside College, from Inveresk (the former dwelling of John Anderson) to Linwood House. Helen McKee was a daughter of the highly esteemed Rev. David McKee, who came to New Zealand in January 1880 as the first vicar of North Belt Church (later known as Knox Church). The Reverend died after only ten months in New Zealand, though. The congregation provided generously for his widow and her children, and at some point, his wife started a school. Helen McKee became a pupil teacher at Riccarton School in 1887. Avonside College remained at Linwood House until 1911, when it relocated to Rhodes Street and was renamed Meriden College.

The Hiorns returned from Sydney in 1911 and lived at Linwood House. Amelia Hiorns died in December of that year, and Edward Hiorns died on 7 July 1912.

=== Various owners (1913–1988) ===
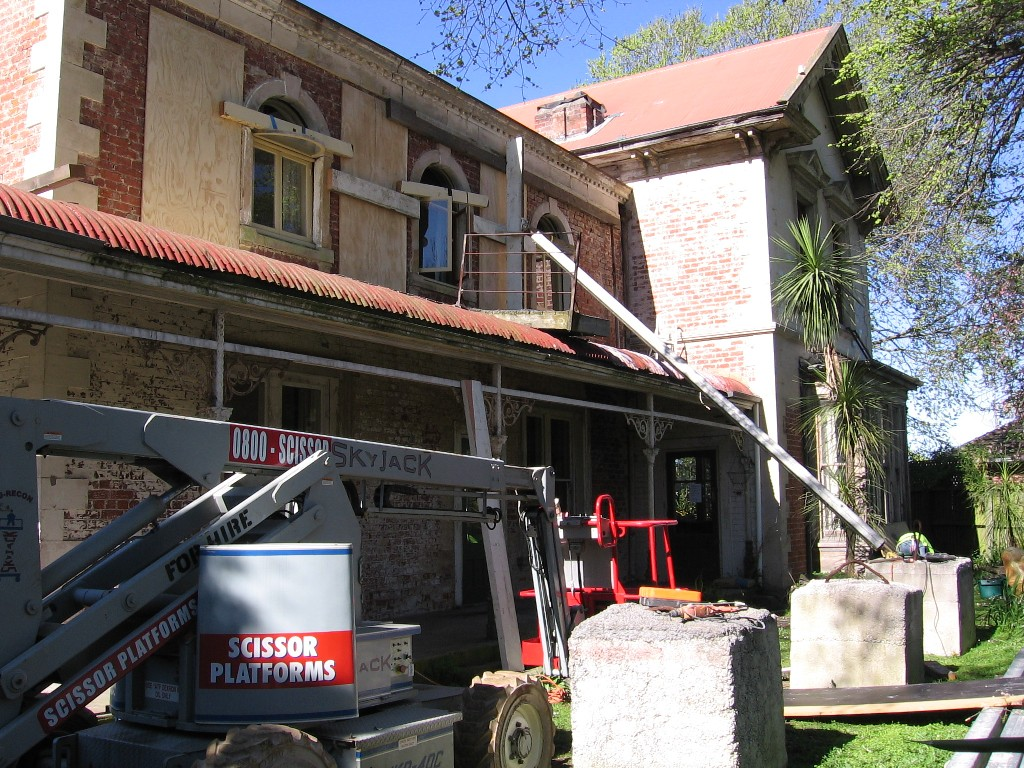
Bracing after the 4 September 2010 earthquake; in the background the 1889 wing designed by John Whitelaw

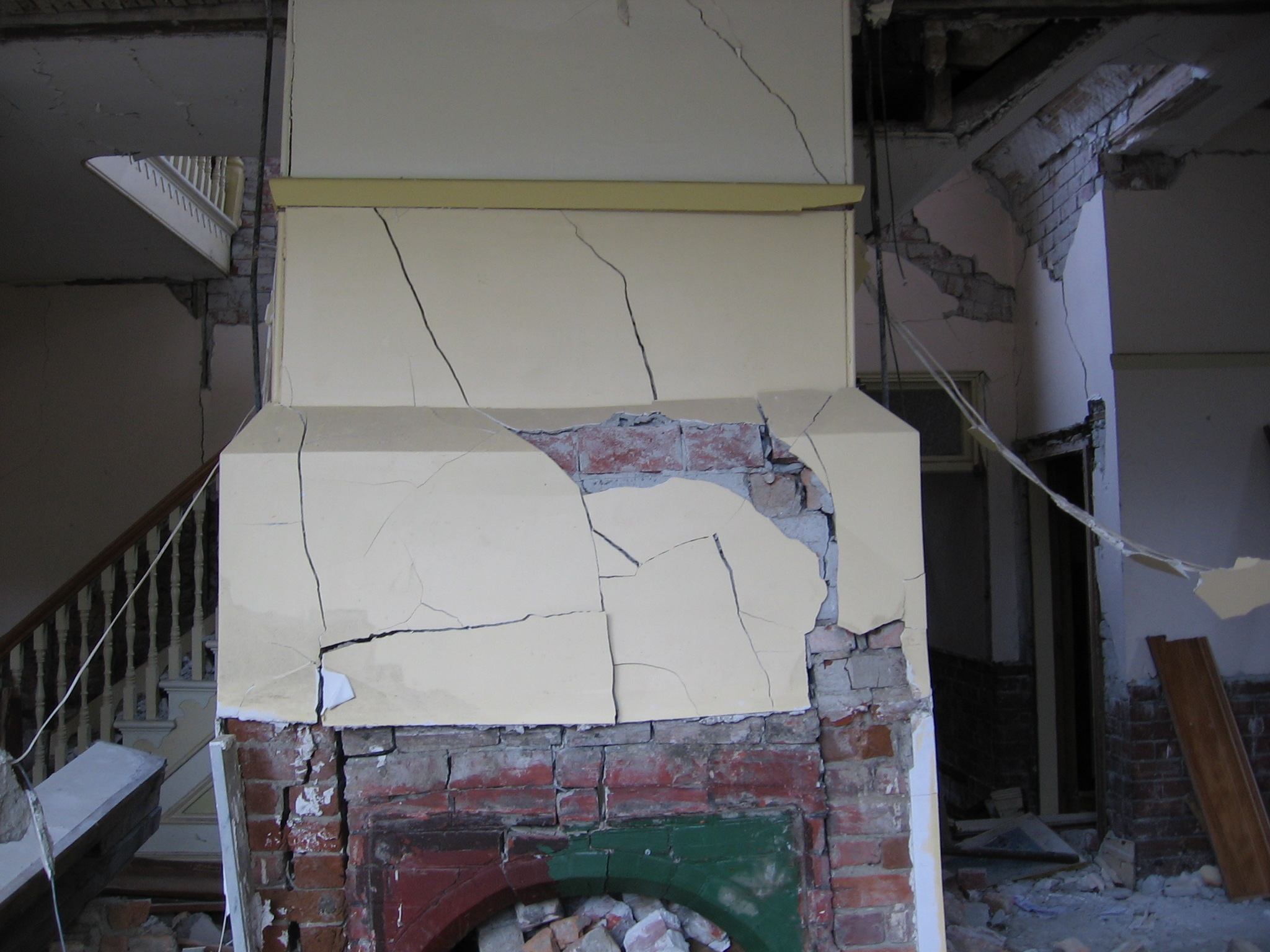
Chimney after the 22 February 2011 earthquake

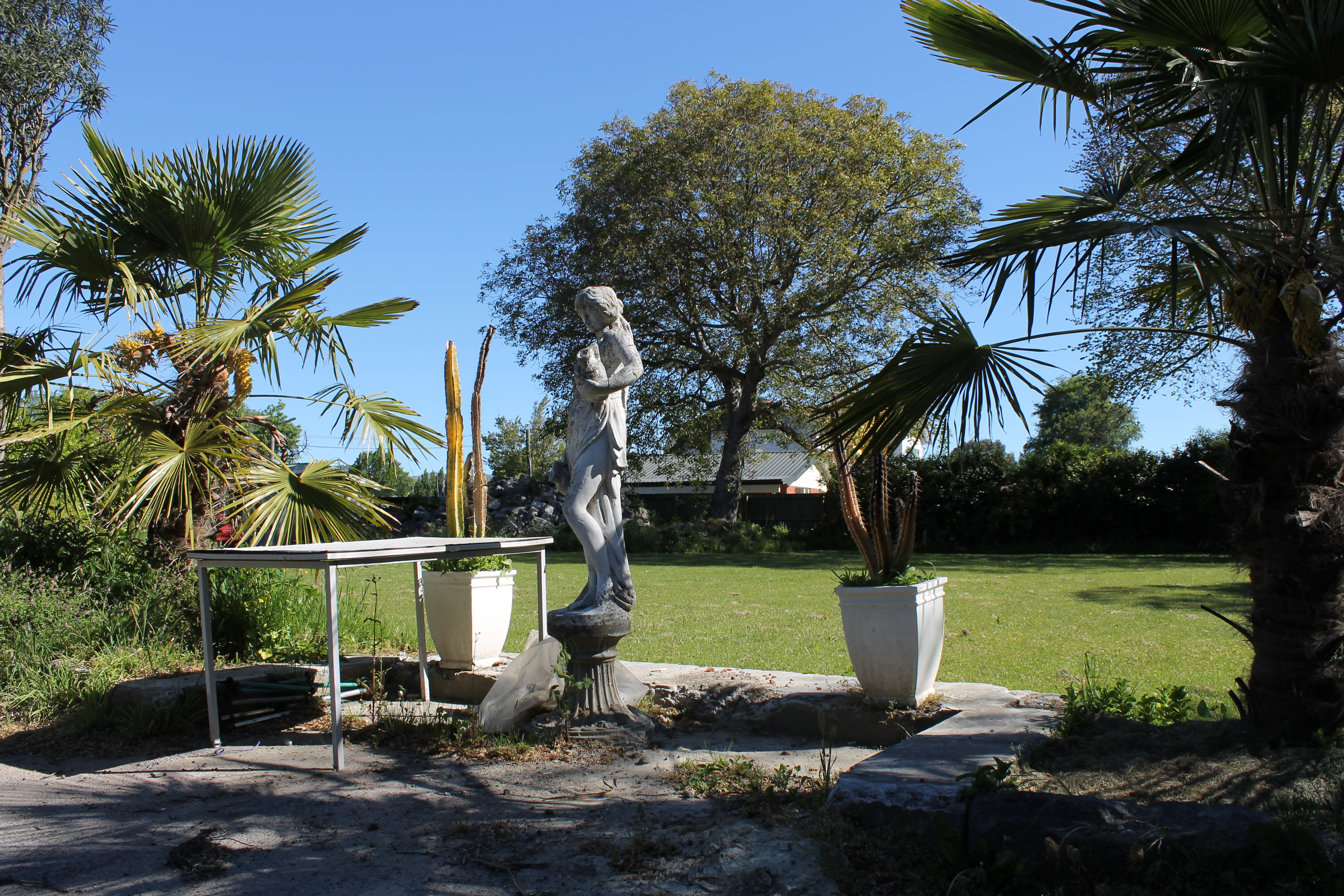
The front door steps are all that remains of Linwood house after demolition.

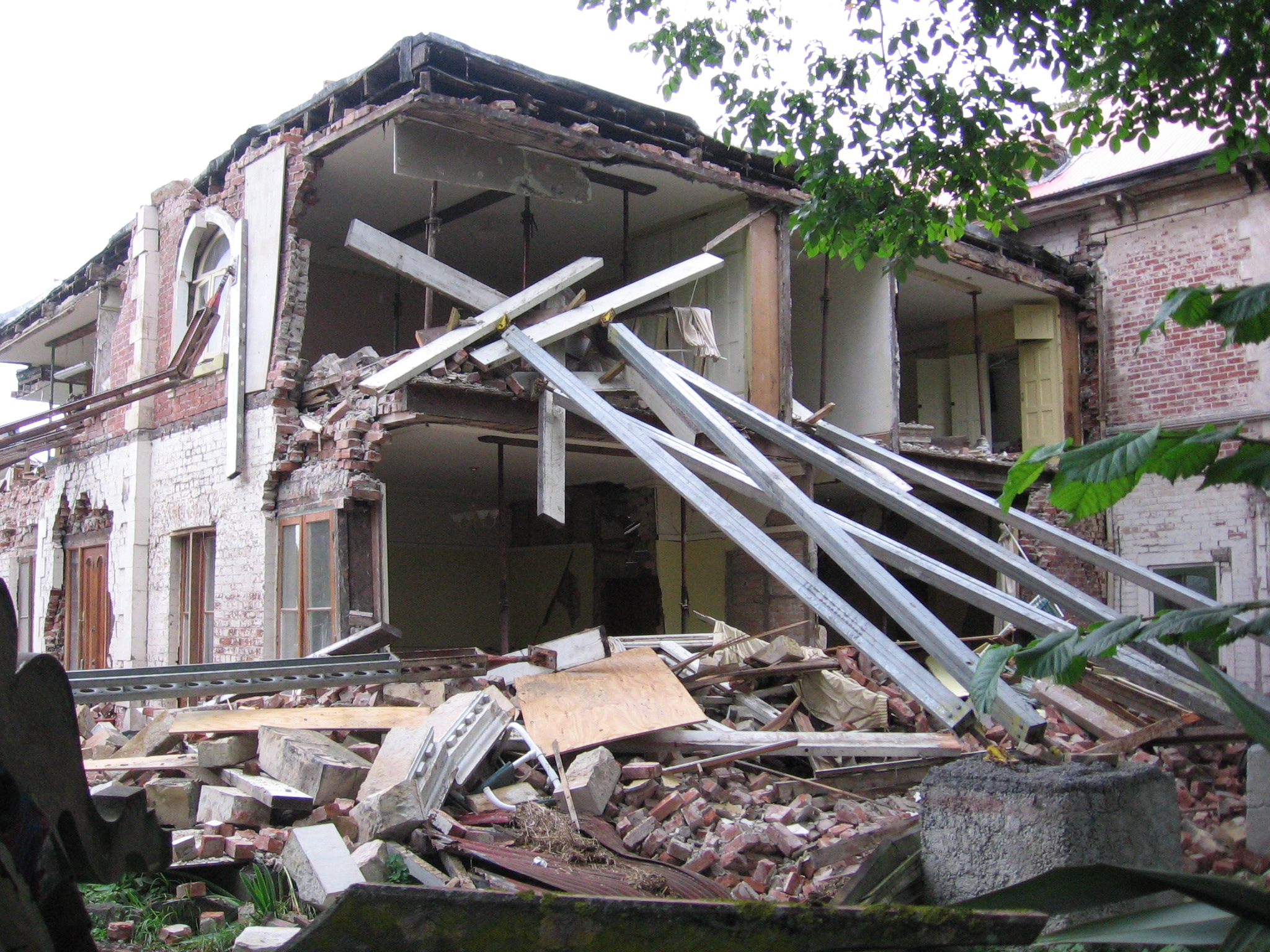
Collapsed wall after the 22 February 2011 earthquake despite bracing

Although the Hiorns had descendants, the estate was managed by the Public Trustee, who put Linwood House up for sale as four sections, with one of those holding the house itself. Three of the sections were purchased by Thomas Marker on 4 June 1913 in an auction, including the one containing the building. Marker paid £200 each for the building sections, and £1,250 for the section containing the house. The furniture of Linwood House was sold in a separate auction. The house was rented to lawyer Francis Ion Cowlishaw, son of prominent provincial councillor William Patten Cowlishaw (1839–1903). Cowlishaw senior had lived nearby in a house named 'Chaddesden', and Cowlishaw Street and Chaddesden Lane are named after the family.

Francis Cowlishaw purchased Linwood House in 1916 for £1,592. In 1920, a dance of Christchurch's social elite was held at Linwood House. Cowlishaw sold the house later that year to Mrs Ethel Pyne, the widow of Frederick Pyne (d. 1915), who was a business partner of former Linwood House lessee Alexander Boyle. Immediately after the purchase, Ethel Pyne engaged Sidney and Alfred Luttrell to design a £700 extension to the house, and it is assumed that this was the addition of a second storey to an earlier service wing. Further subdivisions were carried out in 1927 and 1932, after which Linwood House was sold to Florence Simpson in the latter year. Simpson in turn undertook subdivision in 1935, before selling the remainder to Gordon Branthwaite, a solicitor, in 1945. Records reveal that by 1948, there were six residents living at Linwood House, indicating that the house had been set up for flatting in the meantime. Branthwaite subdivided the land behind Linwood House in 1958. He died in 1972, and his widow sold the property in the same year to Advance Buildings (Nelson) Ltd; her daughter was a partner in that company. Local historian John Wilson, who in 1984 wrote the book Lost Christchurch, that year called Linwood House the "city's worst example of a house which should be preserved being left to decay".

=== Paddy and Jacky Snowdon (1988–present) ===
Paddy and Jacky Snowdon bought the property in 1988. They increased occupancy to seven flats, carried out alterations and achieved compliance with fire regulations. The Snowdons undertook renovations that were long overdue, and that were sympathetic to the historic significance of the building. By 2002, a conservation report had been completed.

Linwood House suffered significant damage in the 2010 Canterbury earthquake. The upstairs and the roof got braced after the event, and this was beneficial when the 2011 Christchurch earthquake struck, but internal walls and fireplaces just "crumbled". Civil Defence ordered the building's demolition in March 2011. It was demolished during the second half of 2011.

A symposium was held on 7 December 2012 in Wellington on New Zealand architecture in the 1850s. One of the papers given was "Gentlemen's residences in 1850s Christchurch: An examination of the homes of William Rolleston and John Cracroft Wilson".

== Heritage listing ==
Linwood House was registered as a heritage building by the New Zealand Historic Places Trust (now Heritage New Zealand) on 17 August 1982 with registration number 3119 classified as D. With the change of the classification system, the building later became a Category II listing.

== Architectural and building history ==
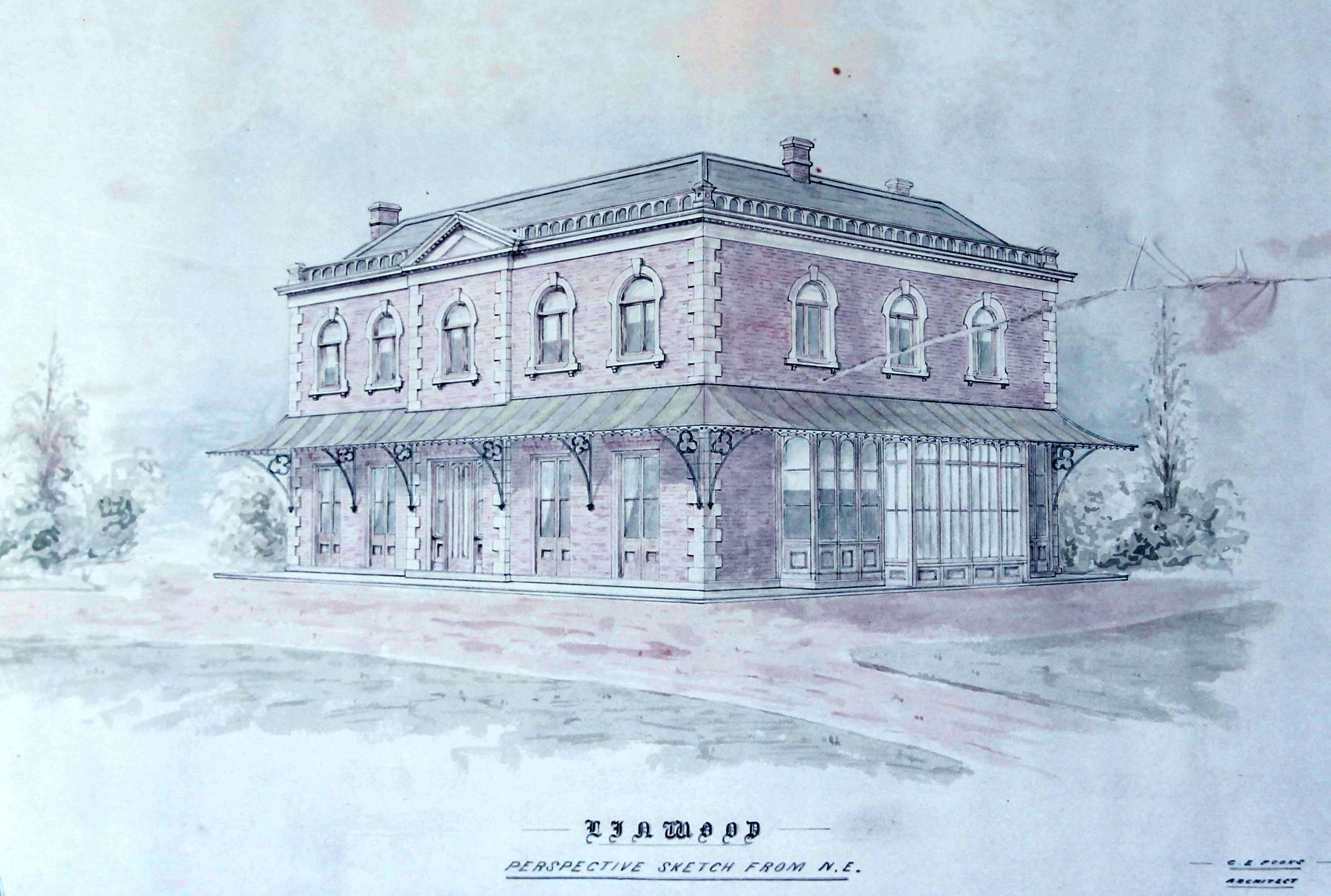
Architect's sketch of Linwood House

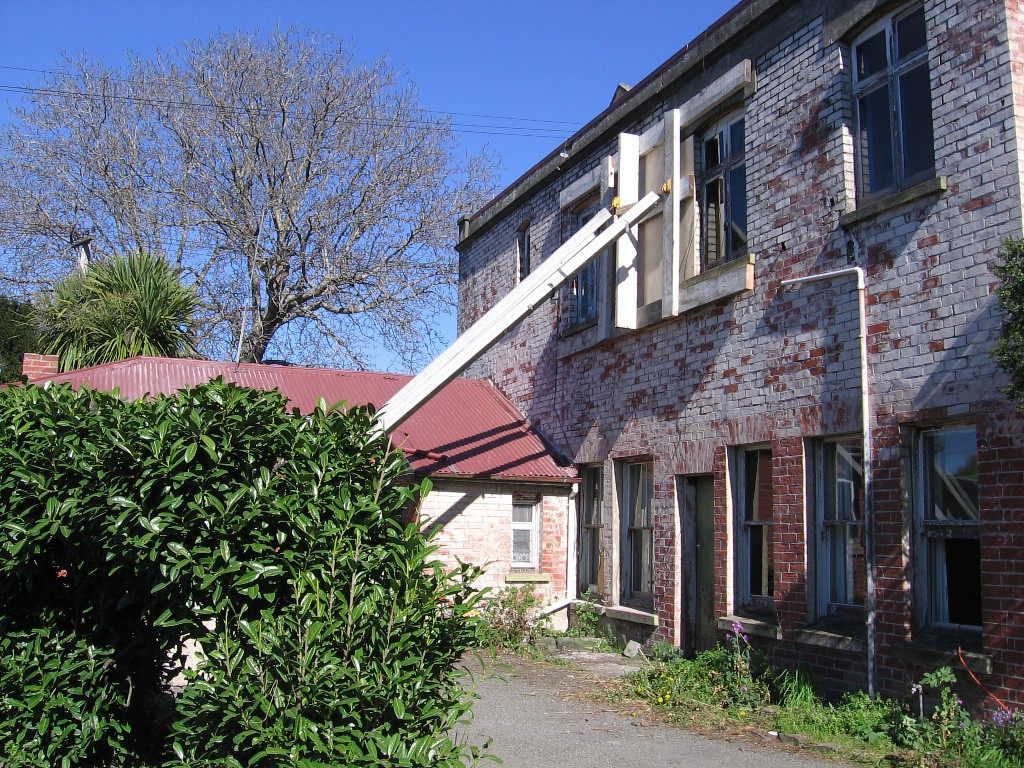
The 1920s Luttrell Brothers' extension and the washhouse, with bracing after the 2010 Canterbury earthquake

The 1857 house is in Regency architectural style. It was oriented so that its long side, facing north-east, was roughly parallel to Linwood Avenue. Rectangular in floor plan, the Linwood Avenue frontage had five bays, with the central bay pedimented, which gave the house a symmetrical look. An 1871 photo by Alfred Barker, held by the Canterbury Museum, shows a verandah on the north-west side of the building only. This verandah was later extended to cover the front as well, and it mirrors the pedimented central bay. A hipped roof was hidden behind a balustrade.

The house was constructed in double brick, and it is this unreinforced masonry construction that was unable to cope with the earthquake forces. Upstairs, windows were round-headed. Downstairs, many of the openings were French doors.

Heritage New Zealand (NZHPT) was for a time uncertain who the architect was. In about 1995, the last owner's daughter, when undertaking research for a school assignment, came across the architect's sketch of Linwood House in the Anglican Church archives, and this proved that Charles Fooks, the brother-in-law of Joseph Brittan, designed the house.

A significant extension was designed in 1889 by John Whitelaw. The south-west wing, 'behind' the original house, used the different architectural style of a Victorian villa for the two-storey addition. The NZHPT assumes that at the same time, a single storey extension was built onto the south-east side.

The last significant extension was added in 1920, which was designed by the Luttrell Brothers. The south-east wing was much more in keeping with the original design. It is possible that the architects designed a second storey for the service wing that had been built in 1889. This extension connected the original house with the original washhouse.

In 1972, a kitchen and small toilet were added as a lean-to. These were removed again in c. 1990.
