= Maria Thomson =

New Zealand businesswoman

Maria Thomson (1809 – 21 December 1875) was a New Zealand businesswoman. She established a private school and invested in property in Christchurch in the late nineteenth century.

== Biography ==
Thomson was born in England and emigrated to New Zealand when she was 43 years old, arriving at Lyttelton on board the Hampshire on 6 May 1853. She purchased two town sections on Oxford Terrace and opened Christchurch Ladies' School on 22 March 1854 in a building called Avon House. She advertised using the name Mrs Charlie Thomson and enrolled both day girls and boarders.

The school was successful and attracted enrolments from Canterbury's leading families, such as Joseph Brittan's daughter Mary Brittan, and the daughter of Judge Henry Barnes Gresson. The school soon grew too large for the Oxford Terrace premises, and re-located several times in its first 10 years. Between 1858 and 1860 Thomson bought four more town sections in Salisbury Street and Park Terrace, and in 1862 built a large house on land in Papanui Road which served as both the school premises and her home. The house was considered the largest house in Christchurch when it was completed.

In 1865 Thomson travelled to England for an extended period, during which time the school was closed. She financed the trip by mortgaging her properties and using her investments in companies such as the Permanent Investment Loan Association. While in England, Thomson wrote and published a book on her travels and life in New Zealand, titled Twelve Years in Canterbury. She returned to Christchurch in 1868 and re-opened her school in Avon House.

Thomson had a stroke in 1875 and died on 21 December of that year at the age of 67. She was buried in the Barbadoes Street Cemetery. Her will, which she had made in October 1875, left the bulk of her estate to Christchurch's Anglican bishop for religious and charitable works. Much of the funds were spent on the establishment and maintenance of Cathedral Grammar School.

After he death, her friends contributed funds for a memorial window in the chapel in the Barbadoes Street Cemetery, and former pupils gathered funds for two memorial windows designed by architect Benjamin Mountfort and placed in the south-eastern corner of the Church of St Michael and All Angels.
