= Joseph Brittan =

New Zealand newspaper editor (1806–1867)

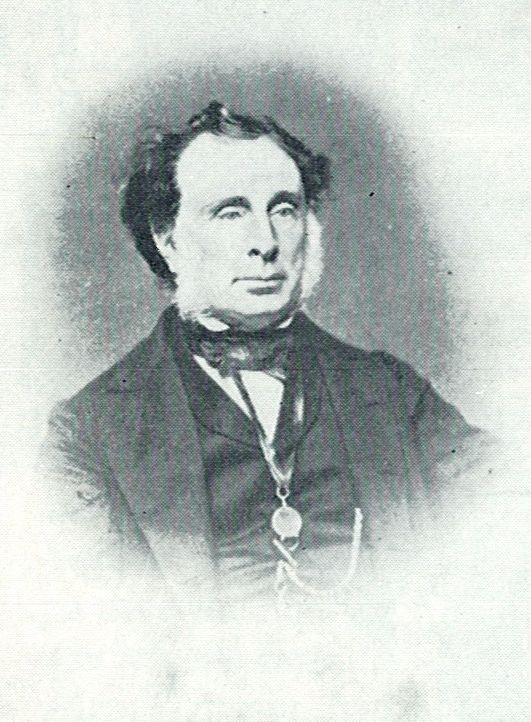
- Portrait of Joseph Brittan

Provincial Secretary of the Canterbury Provincial Council
- In office May 1855 – February 1857
- Preceded by: John Hall
- Succeeded by: Richard Packer

Canterbury Provincial Council
- In office March 1855 – July 1857
- Majority: elected unopposed
- In office August 1861 – September 1862

Personal details
- Born: 12 January 1806 Bristol, England
- Died: 27 October 1867 (aged 62) Christchurch
- Spouse(s): Elizabeth Mary Brittan (née Chandler; d. 1849); Sophia Brittan (née Chandler; m. 1851, d. 1877)
- Relations: Guise Brittan (brother); William Rolleston (son in law); Frank Rolleston (grandson); John Rolleston (grandson)
- Children: Mary Rolleston
- Occupation: Surgeon, newspaper editor, farmer, politician
- Profession: Surgeon

Joseph Brittan (12 January 1806 – 27 October 1867) was a New Zealand surgeon, newspaper editor, and provincial councillor, was one of the dominant figures in early Christchurch. Born into a middle-class family in southern England, he followed his younger brother Guise Brittan to Christchurch, where he and his wife arrived in February 1852 with four children. Joseph Brittan soon got involved in the usual activities of early settlers and gained prominence in doing so. He had bought 100 acres on 10 July 1851 and took up 50 of this to the east of Christchurch that he converted to farmland. There, he built the family residence, and the suburb of Linwood was subsequently named after Brittan's farm and homestead of Linwood House.

The members of the Brittan family were devout Anglicans (although the Brittan family had been Methodists) and had a close association with the neighbouring Holy Trinity Avonside, where Guise Brittan was a lay reader. William Rolleston became Joseph Brittan's son-in-law in 1865, when he married his only surviving daughter Mary; Rolleston was elected Canterbury's third Superintendent just months after Brittan's death.

Brittan was a member of the Canterbury Provincial Council for just over three years. He served as Provincial Secretary from 1855 to 1857 and was expected to succeed James FitzGerald as the second Superintendent of the Canterbury Province, but was beaten by William Sefton Moorhouse in October 1857. He established the third newspaper in Canterbury, the Canterbury Standard, which existed for 12 years until shortly before Brittan's death. Brittan was a very eloquent speaker, but he had a biting and sarcastic character, and was disliked, and even feared, by some. Later in life, he suffered from gout and frequent headaches, and this together with financial trouble, often made him irritable and impatient. He died at his homestead in October 1867 after a long period of declining health.

== Early life ==
Joseph Brittan was born on 12 January 1806 in Bristol, England, into a respectable middle-class family that originated in Bristol. His father was a brewer. He was listed in Kelly's 1848 Directory of Dorset for Sherborne under the heading "Traders" as "agent to Royal Exchange & fire office," and also with his brother William G as "proprietors of 'Sherborne & Yeovil Mercury'". He lived at some point in Linwood, Hampshire. His first wife was Elizabeth Mary Chandler with whom he had seven children. Three of them died in infancy, and then his wife died in 1849, two weeks after the birth and death of their last child. The surviving children were Joseph (Joe), Arthur, Elizabeth Mary (Mary) and Frances (Frank).

Brittan married his deceased wife's sister Sophia as his second wife. This was not legal in England or acceptable to the Church of England. He intended to marry in Denmark where it was legal and the necessary documents for the application were eventually collected and countersigned by the lord Mayor of London on 1 September 1851. However, for some reason the wedding was performed in Gretna Green in Scotland. As was not unusual at the time, having caused such a scandal was responded to by emigrating, which the newly-weds did a month after the ceremony. They sailed for Christchurch in New Zealand on the William Hyde with his other sister-in law and her 2 children, which left Deal, Kent on 21 October 1851. Brittan's younger brother William Guise Brittan (known as Guise Brittan) had immigrated to Christchurch earlier aboard Sir George Seymour in 1850. Guise Brittan had married Louisa Chandler, a sister of Joseph's wives. Charles Fooks, who by this time was in Melbourne was married to another of the Chandler sisters; his wife and children did not travel with him, though. Instead, Mrs Fooks and her two daughters came out on the William Hyde together with Joseph Brittan and family. Also on board was some livestock brought by Joseph Brittan, including a Devon cow, ducks, geese, pheasants, and some rabbits.

During the journey, Brittan performed the duties of the ship's surgeon. He and the ship's chaplain produced a play, The Merchant of Venice, and his contribution was to invite women to act the female roles, which was unusual for the time and a hot topic of conversation causing great amusement. Arriving in Lyttelton on 5 February 1852, most of the immigrants had to find somewhere to live and many slept in tents or under the open sky. The Brittans were among the fortunate few, as a house on Christchurch's Hereford Street had been arranged for them by Guise Brittan. Like everybody else who was heading for Christchurch, upon disembarking from the ship they had to make their way over the Port Hills then follow the steep Bridle Path to reach the city. They carried as many of their possessions as possible, but following months at sea, their fitness was rather poor. The remainder of their possessions was shipped by whaleboat around the coast and up the Avon River, which was a dangerous undertaking due to the Sumner sand bar located at the entrance to the Avon Heathcote Estuary.

== Life in New Zealand ==
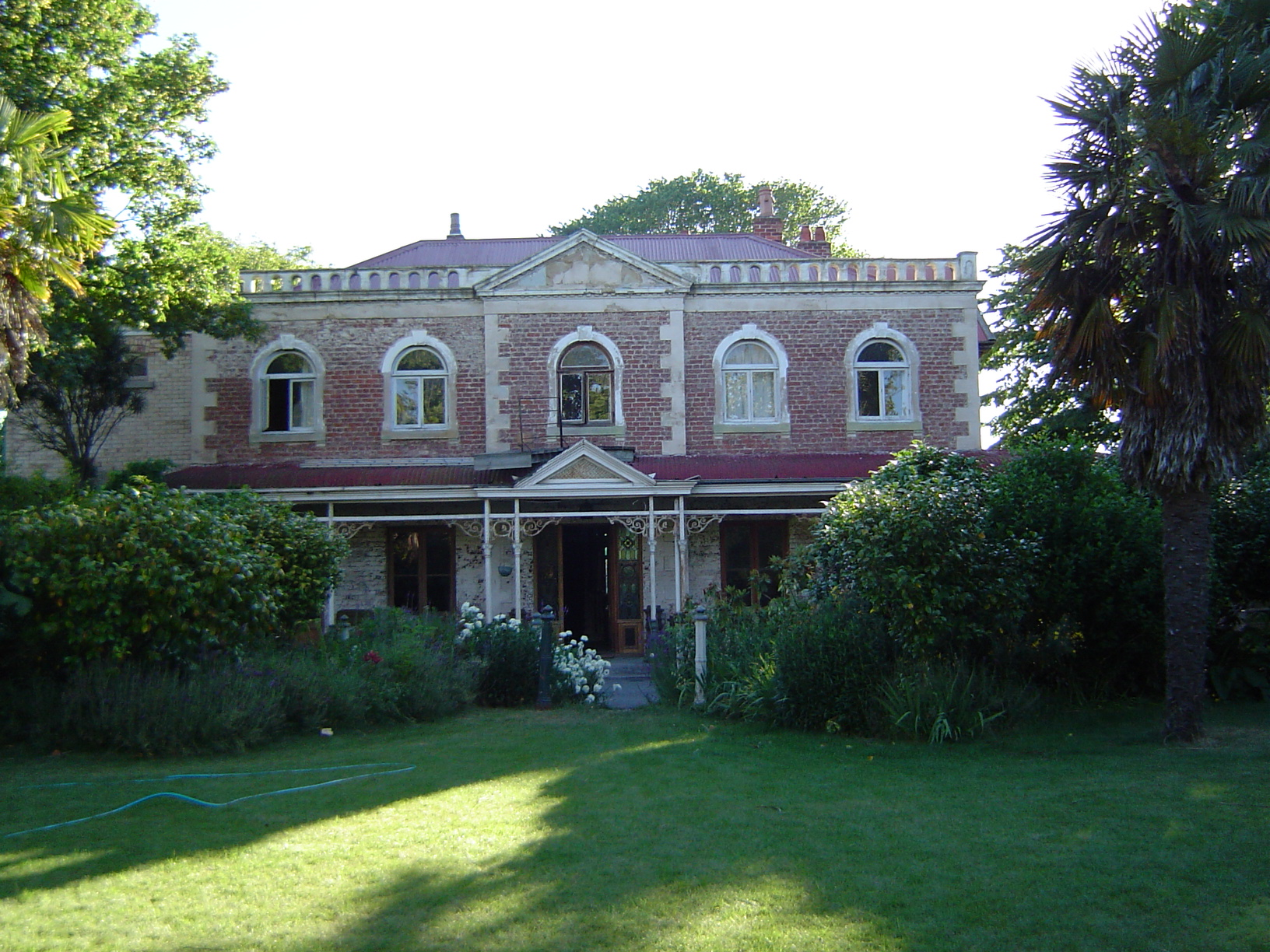
Linwood House in 2003

Christchurch, still a very small settlement (it had around 140 buildings in early 1852), already had two doctors, so Brittan's services in that area were not required. Instead, he followed his brother's interest and became involved in land speculation. He bought rural section (RS) 300, a triangular piece of land of 50 acres (20 ha) along Canal Reserve (later called Linwood Avenue), with the northern tip of the land touching the Avon River. He leased the adjacent RS 301, which he later purchased. In total, the property had 110 acres (45 ha), which was in addition to land he owned at Papanui Bush.

Brittan converted the land in Avonside to farming, with 10 acres (40,000 m^{2}) set aside for a homestead, garden and orchard. He called the property Linwood after his place in Hampshire. Linwood House was ready in 1857 and the family moved there from their first home on Hereford Street. Adjacent to his farm was Holy Trinity Avonside, which at the time was a cob church. On 24 February 1857, it became the first Anglican church in Canterbury consecrated by Bishop Harper, and Guise Brittan, as churchwarden, read the lesson at the service. The entire Brittan family had a close connection to the church, with Joseph Brittan helping to raise money for its construction, and Mary Brittan singing in the church choir. They faithfully attended church on Sundays, and when subscriptions were taken for the construction of ChristChurch Cathedral, Brittan pledged a generous £100.

Brittan had sundry interests and immediately upon arriving in Christchurch, joined others in various activities. He played cricket in Hagley Park within a fortnight of reaching Christchurch, and later helped improve the grounds and raised money for fencing the area. He also pursued horse racing, later bred horses, and hosted Canterbury's first steeplechase on his Linwood farm. The Brittans enjoyed music, and not only did Sophia play her piano brought from England, but Joseph played a portable harmonium. He joined a musical group in the port town of Lyttelton, which in the early years was culturally more important than Christchurch, and walked there over the Bridle Path with his instrument strapped to his back. Musical evenings were also held at the Brittan home.

=== Newspaper proprietorship ===
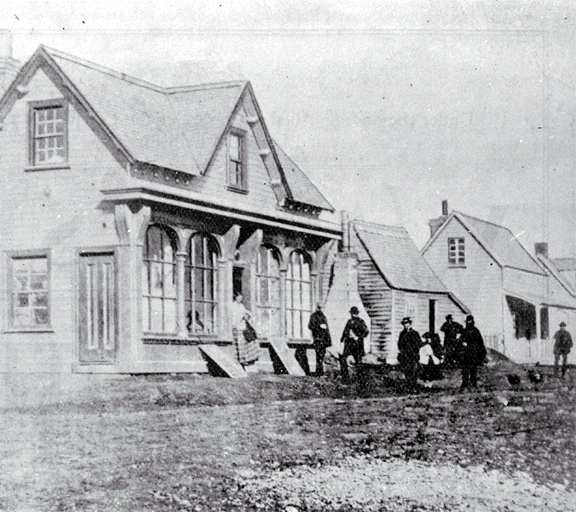
The office of the Canterbury Standard on Hereford Street in 1861

Before they emigrated, Joseph and Guise Brittan had been proprietors of the Sherborne Mercury, a newspaper covering Dorset and outlying areas. In his new country Brittan continued this line of work, becoming the founder, proprietor and editor, of the Canterbury Standard, published from 1854 to 1866. The advertisement announcing this new paper appeared in the Lyttelton Times in August 1853. Owned in part by William Thomson and James Willis, the paper was first published on 3 June 1854, and became the third newspaper in Canterbury, following the Lyttelton Times (first published in 1851) and the short-lived Guardian and Canterbury Advertiser (published for three months in 1852).

Brittan was also part of a ten-member syndicate that in February 1862 attempted to formalise the ownership of another Christchurch newspaper, The Press, which had been founded in the previous year. A deed of association for "The Proprietors of The Press" was drafted, but surprisingly, the deed was not executed. Four months later Brittan's political colleague, James FitzGerald, who had no funds, was the sole owner "through the liberality of the proprietors", as he called it later. Part of Brittan's interest in The Press was its declared opposition to the proposal to connect Christchurch and Lyttelton via a rail tunnel, a project that he himself was strongly opposed to. Brittan and Henry Jacobs, the first headmaster of Christchurch's first school, Christ's College, are listed as two major writers for The Press during its early years. Before mid-1863 FitzGerald had a prolonged absence from Christchurch, and Brittan became the acting editor of The Press. In 1866 the Canterbury Standard was sold at auction to The Press, which within days, on 23 April, stopped its publication.

=== Political career ===
Elections were first held in New Zealand in the second half of 1853, and two levels of government were introduced: a House of Representatives at the national level, and Provincial Councils for the six provinces. Brittan first stood for public office in 1855, when membership of the Canterbury Provincial Council was expanded and various seats across many electorates became available. As a resident of Hereford Street, he stood in the Town of Christchurch electorate, where two positions were to be filled. For weeks campaigning filled the newspapers, with candidates using derogatory language towards each other, and Brittan being accused of "assiduously frequenting the public houses". When the nomination meeting was held on 8 March in Market Square, only Brittan and Dr Alfred Charles Barker were nominated, and both were thus declared elected.

In May 1855, the Executive Council, led by John Hall as Provincial Secretary, resigned. James FitzGerald, the Province's first Superintendent, tasked Brittan to form a new Executive Council, and he succeeded Hall as Provincial Secretary. While FitzGerald was attending the first session of the 2nd Parliament in Auckland in 1856, Brittan deputised for him. Brittan resigned as Provincial Secretary in February 1857 and was succeeded by Richard Packer, but remained on the Provincial Council until the end of the first term in July 1857, when he did not seek re-election.

Later in 1857, FitzGerald resigned from Parliament on the advice of his doctors, and also decided not to seek re-election as provincial Superintendent. Robert Heaton Rhodes offered a requisition to Brittan to make himself available for the by-election that would result from FitzGerald's resignation from Parliament in the Lyttelton electorate, but Brittan replied that he could not absent himself from his private affairs as yet; Parliament at that time met in Auckland, and the 1858 session lasted from 10 April to 21 August, which required an absence from home for several months. Instead, Crosbie Ward, the editor and proprietor of the Lyttelton Times, was the only person nominated on 28 May 1858 and was thus declared elected.

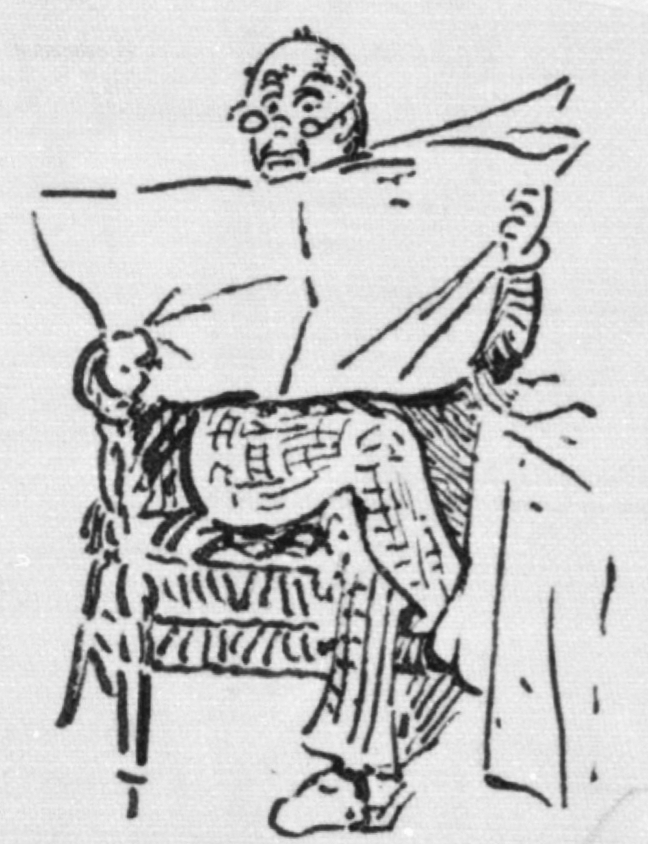
Joseph Brittan caricature

The public generally expected that Brittan would succeed FitzGerald as Superintendent, but this did not transpire. Brittan became a candidate for the position when he published his political views in a long letter that appeared in almost all editions of the bi-weekly Lyttelton Times over a period of several months. William Sefton Moorhouse announced his candidacy a few months later, but was not only less experienced than Brittan, but a less polished public speaker. William Richmond, who visited from Taranaki during the election campaign, remarked that "Joe Brittan is a much cleverer man than Moorhouse who seems a softie". The idea of building the Lyttelton Rail Tunnel became the central issue of the election campaign. Moorhouse was a strong proponent of the project, whilst Brittan was opposed to it. Moorhouse received much support for his position from the residents of Lyttelton, as evidenced by the results of the election: of the 12,000 residents of Canterbury, including 3,205 in Christchurch and 1,944 in Lyttelton, both candidates received 206 votes from the residents of Christchurch. However, overall results were a victory for Moorhouse by 727 votes to 352. Moorhouse later began the project by turning the first sod on 17 July 1861. Helping Moorhouse in his 30 October 1857 election victory was the support of John Ollivier, a skilled orator who was regarded as the 'kingmaker' and had a reputation as 'perhaps the best after-dinner speaker'.

Following his January 1860 resignation from Parliament, Ollivier spearheaded a requisition, broadly supported by influential people, to have Brittan make himself available for the resulting by-election in the Christchurch Country electorate. Brittan declined the requisition, mostly because he was opposed to the rail tunnel scheme which had overwhelming support by the population, and he could not see himself being their representative if he disagreed with this popular public opinion. Isaac Cookson, who had earlier supported the Brittan requisition, was elected.

On 30 August 1861, a nomination meeting was held for the election of a Canterbury Superintendent, and to fill the four positions on the Provincial Council available in the City of Christchurch electorate. Moorhouse was returned unopposed as Superintendent, and ten candidates were nominated for the Provincial Council. The election was held the next day, and Brittan topped the polls with 140 votes, followed by Isaac Cookson with 139, Frederick Thompson with 114, and Richard Westenra with 100, these being the men who were elected. Isaac Luck, Edward Reece, George Wilmer, William Barnard, John Cracroft Wilson, and Richard Taylor were defeated.

Within months, Moorhouse prorogued the council, and another election was scheduled. Seven candidates were nominated for the four positions available in the City of Christchurch electorate. At the election in May 1862, Brittan again topped the poll, with Isaac Cookson and Richard Westenra being re-elected, and Samuel Bealey also being elected. In September of the same year, Brittan announced his resignation from the Provincial Council, citing declining health, but it is thought that the loss of his son earlier that year was also a factor. Brittan was succeeded by James Somerville Turnbull, who was elected unopposed. William Wilson, who later became the first Mayor of Christchurch, publicly thanked Brittan at Turnbull's nomination meeting for the years of service that he had given.

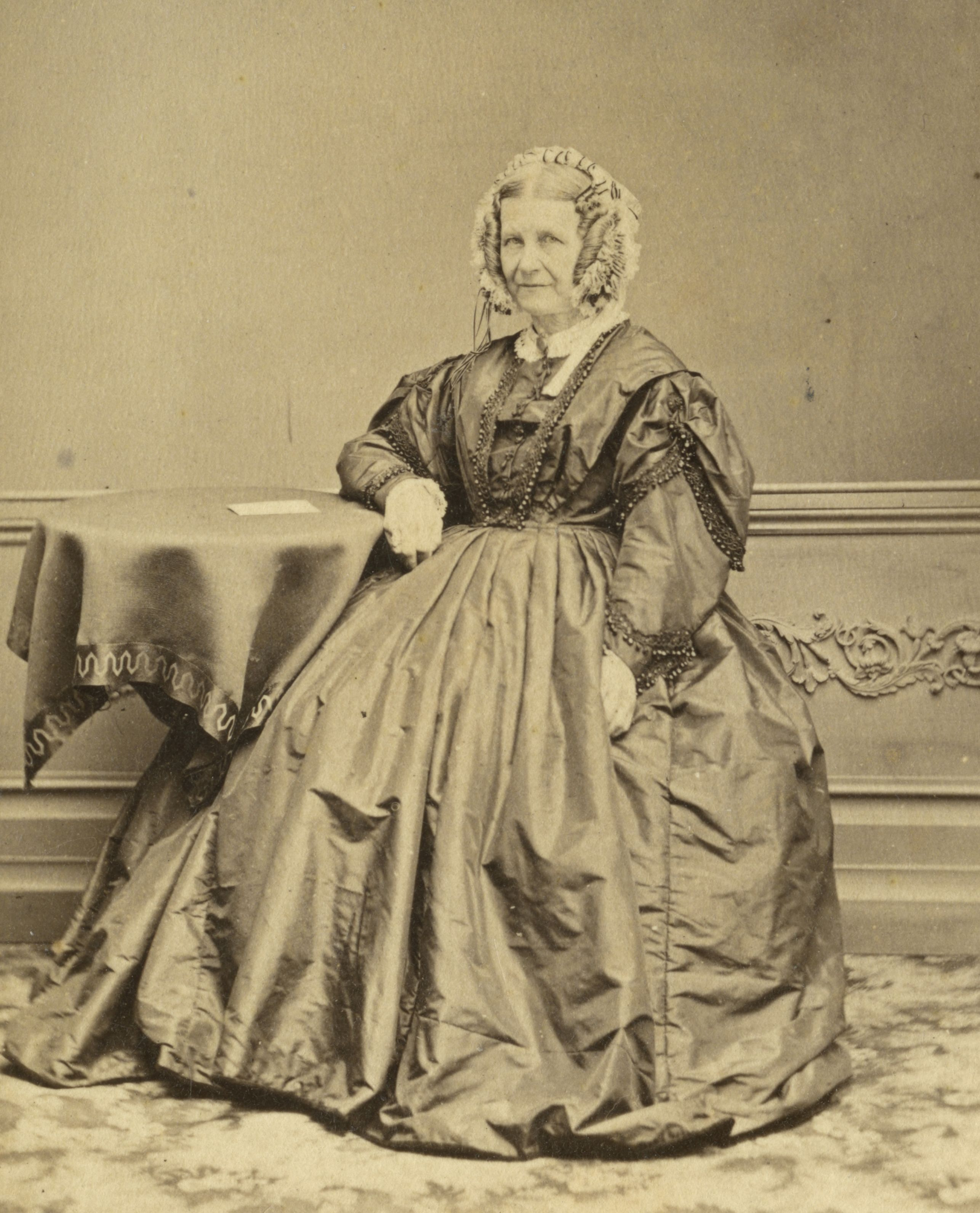
Sophia Brittan in 1872

In mid-1863, Brittan was appointed resident magistrate for Christchurch and Kaiapoi, succeeding John Hall. Declining health made this position untenable for him, and he resigned after nine months, being succeeded by Charles Bowen.

=== Family, death and legacy ===
Brittan had six children, all with his first wife; two died in childhood in England. They are Joseph (1836–1924); Emma Sophia (1838–1839), Adelaide Mary (1841–1842), Arthur Stanley (1843–1862), Elizabeth Mary (Mary; 1845–1940), and Francis (Frank) Henry (1847–1940) who married Florence Laura Templer in 1878.

His three sons Joe, Arthur and Frank, all attended Christ's College.

The eldest son, Joe, appears to have been of a simple mind and was never tasked with important roles He later lived as a recluse, being regarded as a burden to the family, though he had had three years at King's School, Sherbonne and was top of the senior class in 1852. So he showed some academic brilliance at Christ's College and may have been autistic or had a nervous breakdown. He and 15 others petitioned Godley in 1852 asking for land for school cricket or football. He stayed for some years with the Fooks family in Timaru.

Mary was likely first educated privately with her nieces at the home of her aunt. In 1854, Maria Thomson opened a private School for Young Ladies on Oxford Terrace, which Mary attended until she was 16. After the family moved to Linwood House in 1857, Mary continued at that school as a boarder.

Tragedy struck on 1 January 1862, when Arthur Brittan drowned in the Avon River while learning to swim. He got entangled in watercress, which the Brittans themselves had introduced to the Avon, and it took a half-hour for his body to be recovered. Arthur had left school by then and was helping his father on the farm. Joseph Brittan was heartbroken and there are indications that he went through a period of depression. Soon after the drowning, he advertised for both a dairyman and a farmworker, and even put Linwood House up for sale, though no property transaction was recorded.

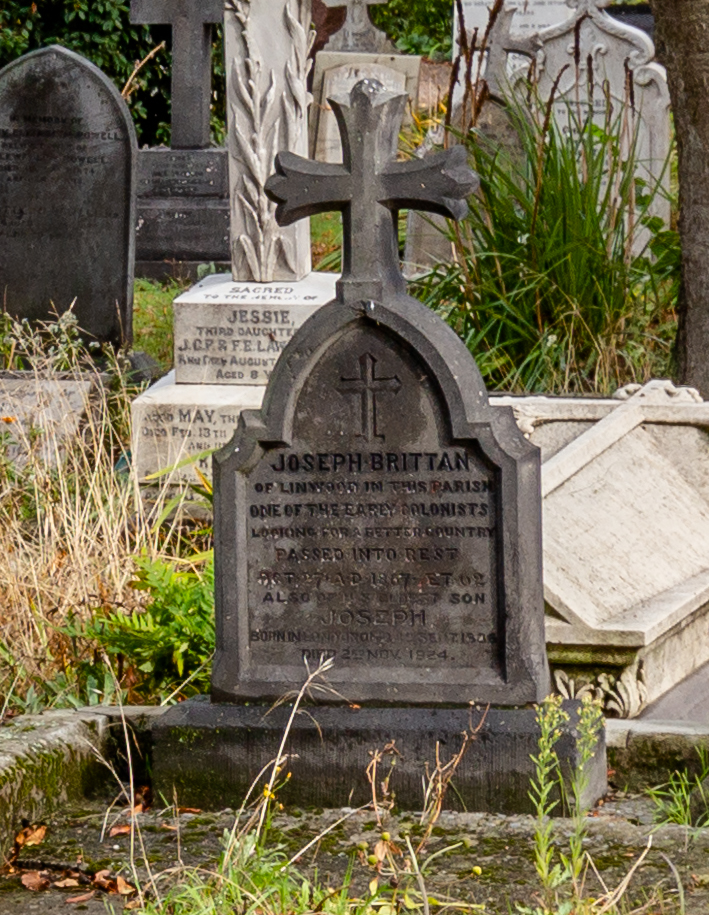
Joseph Brittan's grave at Holy Trinity Avonside

William Rolleston, at the time Provincial Secretary, proposed to Mary Brittan in early 1865. He was 34 at the time, and she was 19. Both Joseph and Sophia Brittan were opposed to this marriage, which is surprising, given that Rolleston was intelligent, well educated, successful, and even of higher social standing. They thought he was too old for their daughter, and that she was too young to marry. Perhaps Sophia Brittan did not want to lose her daughter, who was in effect running the household and entertaining guests, as she was often too ill to look after these tasks herself. Despite parental objections, an engagement was announced, soon after which Rolleston was offered and accepted the role of Under Secretary for Native Affairs, requiring a move to Wellington. Hence, the wedding went ahead on 24 May 1865 at Avonside Trinity Church, after which the newly-weds moved to the capital.

Sophia Brittan was often ill, and health was a dominant issue in her life. Joseph Brittan also had his problems, suffering from frequent headaches and gout, and together with financial trouble, he was often irritable and impatient. Joseph Brittan's health declined during 1867. Distressing for the family were the financial affairs, with various debts that only Joseph knew about. Rolleston tried to give financial advice to both Sophia and Frank Brittan, but he was ignored. Joseph Brittan died on 27 October 1867 at Linwood House. He was buried at Holy Trinity Avonside next to his son Arthur, and when Sophia Brittan died in August 1877 she was buried near her husband. Brittan's oldest son Joseph died in 1924, and an inscription for him was placed on his father's grave stone.

Brittan's daughter's biographer (Rosamund Rolleston, his great-granddaughter) described him as "a man of ability and a polished speaker [his] biting, sarcastic manner made him both feared and disliked", and as "quarrelsome and uncompromising". In his obituary, he was described "as a speaker [who] took very high rank, possessing a force and fluency of expression, a power of lucid statement, and a readiness in debate, which with one or two exceptions have never been equalled in the Council." Brittan Street was named for him and first appeared in street directories in 1892. Linwood House, which fronted onto both Linwood Avenue and Brittan Street, was registered by Heritage New Zealand as a class D heritage building in 1982, and with a change of the classification system later, it later became a Category II listing. Significantly damaged in both the September 2010 and the February 2011 earthquakes, Civil Defence ordered the building's demolition in March 2011, which was carried out later that year.

== Notes ==
Political offices
Preceded by John Hall	Provincial Secretary of the Canterbury Province; 1855–1857	Succeeded by Richard Packer
