= William Rolleston =

New Zealand politician (1831–1903)

The Honourable William Rolleston
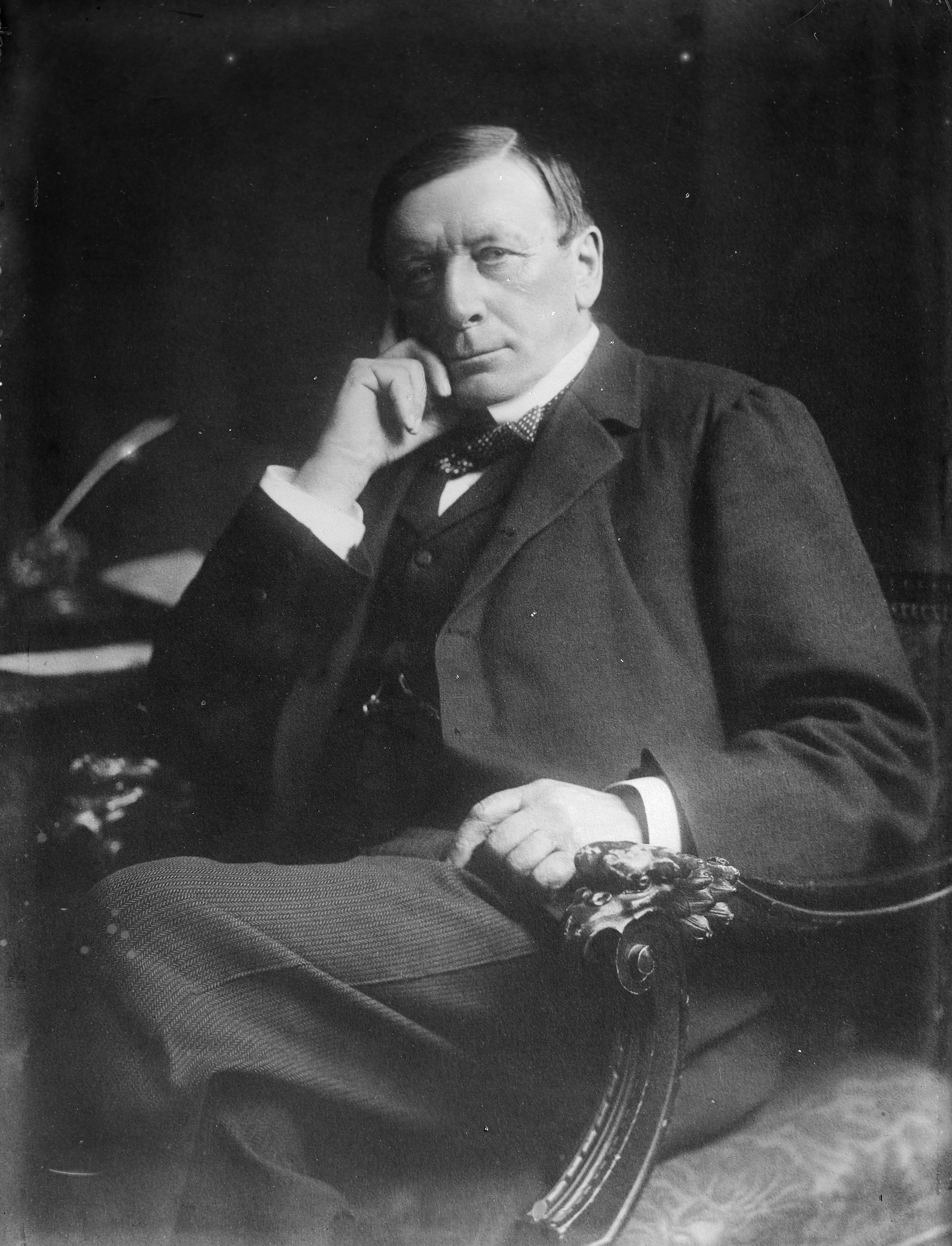
- William Rolleston in 1895

3rd Leader of the Opposition
- In office 31 August 1891 – 8 November 1893
- Preceded by: John Bryce
- Succeeded by: William Russell

12th Minister of Native Affairs
- In office February 1881 – 19 October 1881
- Prime Minister: John Hall
- Preceded by: John Bryce
- Succeeded by: John Bryce

6th Minister of Justice
- In office 15 December 1880 – 23 April 1881
- Prime Minister: John Hall
- Preceded by: John Sheehan
- Succeeded by: Thomas Dick

Member of the New Zealand Parliament for Avon
- In office 8 June 1868 – 27 June 1884

Member of the New Zealand Parliament for Geraldine
- In office 22 July 1884 – 15 July 1887

Member of the New Zealand Parliament for Halswell
- In office 5 December 1890 – 8 November 1893

Member of the New Zealand Parliament for Riccarton
- In office 4 December 1896 – 15 November 1899

4th Superintendent of Canterbury Province
- In office 22 May 1868 – 1 January 1877

Personal details
- Born: 19 September 1831 Yorkshire, England
- Died: 8 February 1903 (aged 71) Canterbury, New Zealand
- Spouse: Mary Rolleston (married 1865)
- Relations: Rolleston family
- Profession: Farmer

William Rolleston (19 September 1831 – 8 February 1903) was a New Zealand politician, public administrator, educationalist, and Canterbury provincial superintendent.

== Biography ==
=== Early life ===
Rolleston was born on 19 September 1831 at Maltby, Yorkshire, the 9th child of the Rev. George Rolleston and Anne Nettleship. His older brother was the physician and zoologist George Rolleston. He attended Rossall School and Emmanuel College, where he graduated in 1855 with second class honours in the classical tripos. He had intended to move to Canterbury but his father advised against it so he took up tutoring. However, this was merely a means of raising enough money to leave England in order to reject 'Conservatives and Ecclesiastics'.

=== Political career ===
New Zealand Parliament
Years	Term	Electorate	Party
1868–1871	4th	Avon	Independent
1871–1875	5th	Avon	Independent
1875–1879	6th	Avon	Independent
1879–1881	7th	Avon	Independent
1881–1884	8th	Avon	Independent
1884–1887	9th	Geraldine	Independent
1890–1893	11th	Halswell	Conservative
1896–1899	13th	Riccarton	Conservative

Rolleston first joined the Canterbury Provincial Council when he was appointed to the Canterbury Executive Council on 4 December 1863. His tenure on the Executive Council finished on 16 June 1865. On 23 January 1864, he was elected as a provincial councillor in the Heathcote electorate and remained a councillor until 23 June 1865. On 22 May 1868, he was elected unopposed as the 4th (and last) Superintendent of the Canterbury Province. He held that office until the abolition of the provinces on 31 October 1876.

Rolleston represented the Avon electorate from a by-election in 1868 to 1884. In 1878 as an MP Rolleston proposed a school for deaf children. The government agreed to open a state school for the deaf in Christchurch, and the Sumner Deaf and Dumb Institution opened in 1880.

In the 1879 general election, he was returned unopposed. He then represented Geraldine from 1884 to 1887. The Geraldine electorate was abolished in 1887 and replaced with the Rangitata, where he was defeated by Searby Buxton. He then represented Halswell from 1890 to 1893. The Halswell electorate was abolished in 1893, and he contested Ellesmere, where he was defeated. He then represented Riccarton from 1896 to 1899. He had won the 1896 election against George Russell, but was defeated by him in 1899 by just one vote.

Rolleston served as Minister of Justice in the government of Premier John Hall from December 1880 to April 1881. He was also appointed Minister of Native Affairs in January 1881 after the resignation of John Bryce, heading the department as the Government prepared to invade the Māori settlement of Parihaka in November. Rolleston stood aside as minister on the night of 19 October 1881 after the Hall government's Executive Council held an emergency meeting in the absence of Governor Sir Arthur Gordon to issue a proclamation against Māori prophet Te Whiti and the inhabitants of Parihaka, ordering them to leave Parihaka and accept the sale and dismemberment of their land or face "the great evil which must fall on them". He was replaced as minister by his predecessor, John Bryce, who three weeks later led a raid by 1600 Armed Constabulary on the settlement, the centre of a passive resistance campaign against the sale of Māori land.

In 1891 he was elected unopposed as Leader of the Opposition.

In 1893 he supported women's suffrage, and subsequently claimed the credit in the 1893 election.

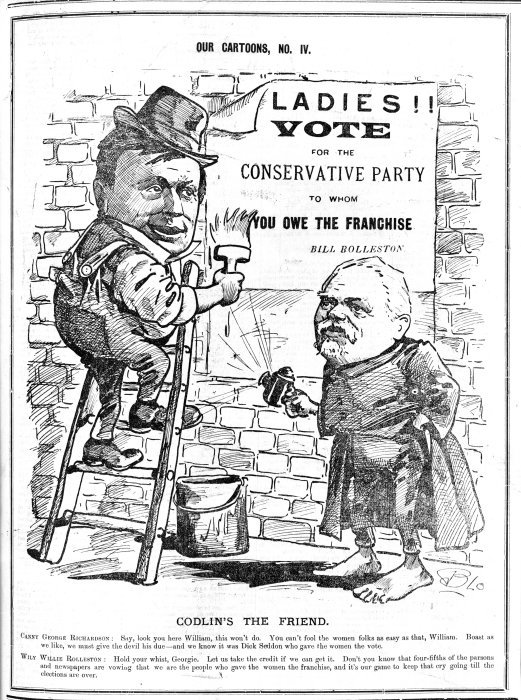
An 1893 cartoon depicting William Rolleston urging women to vote for the Conservative Party to whom they "owe the franchise".

=== Later life and commemoration ===
He married Elizabeth Mary Brittan in 1865 at Avonside, Christchurch; she was the daughter of Joseph Brittan. They had four daughters and five sons, including John, Frank and Arthur Rolleston. William Rolleston died at his Rangitata farm at Kapunatiki on 8 February 1903. He is buried in the grounds of the former Holy Trinity Avonside church in Linwood, which was demolished in 2011 following an earthquake. A new church was built on the same site. A statue of William Rolleston was erected in front of the Canterbury Museum.

== Notes ==
Political offices
Preceded by William Sefton Moorhouse	Superintendent of Canterbury Province; 1868–1877	Provincial Councils abolished
Preceded by John Ballance	Minister of Education; 1879–1880	Succeeded by Thomas Dick
Preceded by John Sheehan	Minister of Justice; 1880–1881	Succeeded by Thomas Dick
Preceded by John Bryce	Minister of Native Affairs; 1881	Succeeded by John Bryce
New Zealand Parliament
Preceded by William Reeves	Member of Parliament for Avon; 1868–1884	Succeeded by Leonard Harper
Preceded by William Postlethwaite	Member of Parliament for Geraldine; 1884–1887	In abeyance Title next held by Arthur Rhodes
New constituency	Member of Parliament for Halswell; 1890–1893	Constituency abolished
Preceded by George Russell	Member of Parliament for Riccarton; 1896–1899	Succeeded by George Russell
