= Mary Rolleston =

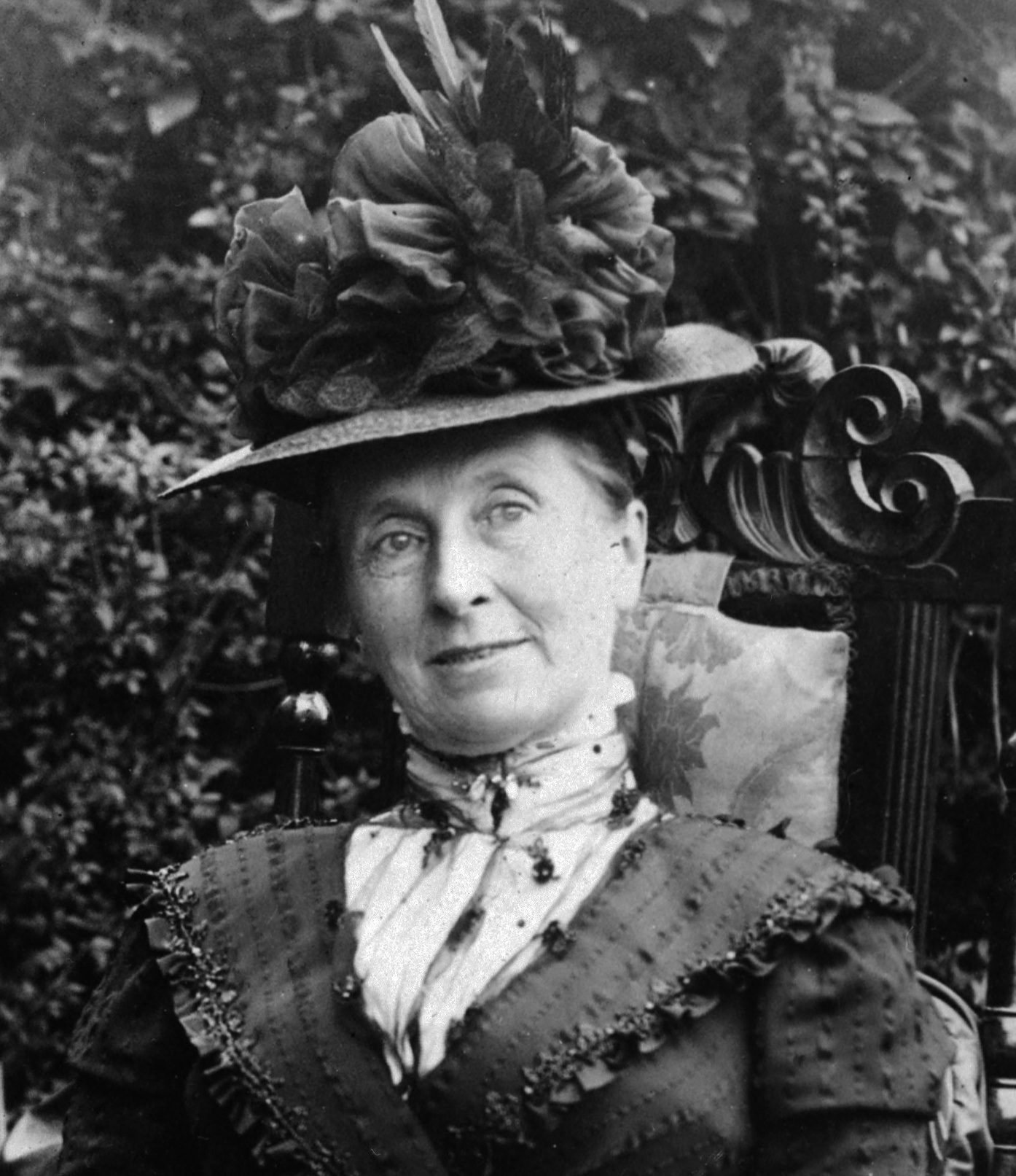
- Rolleston in 1900
- Born: Elizabeth Mary Brittan; 30 March 1845; Castleton, Dorset, England
- Died: 4 June 1940 (aged 95); Christchurch, New Zealand
- Known for: political hostess community leader

Elizabeth Mary Rolleston (30 March 1845 – 4 June 1940), known as Mary Rolleston, was a New Zealand homemaker, political hostess and community leader.

She was born Elizabeth Mary Brittan in Castleton, Dorset, England in 1845. Her parents were Joseph Brittan, a surgeon and newspaper proprietor, and Elizabeth Mary Brittan (née Chandler). She had five siblings, two of whom died in infancy and a fortnight after the birth and then death of the last child in 1849, her mother herself died. The surviving siblings were Joseph (Joe), Arthur, and Frances (Frank). She attended Mrs Thomson's School for Young Ladies in Christchurch.

Mary Brittan married William Rolleston on 24 May 1865 at Holy Trinity Avonside. She died in Christchurch on 4 June 1940.
