= Thomas Joynt =

Thomas Joynt KC
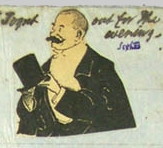
- Sketch of Thomas Joynt
- Born: December 1830; Dunmore, County Galway, Ireland
- Died: 5 September 1907 (aged 77); Christchurch, New Zealand
- Occupation(s): barrister and solicitor
- Known for: senior member of the New Zealand bar

Thomas Ingham Joynt KC (December 1830 – 5 September 1907) was a senior member of the New Zealand legal profession from Christchurch. Born in Ireland, he emigrated to Canterbury with his wife and child in 1856. He had commenced legal training in Dublin and was admitted to the bar in 1863 in Christchurch; at the same time, he set up his own legal firm. Over the years, he formed various partnerships with other solicitors. Joynt became known as a defence lawyer and had many high-profile cases, but he was equally successful in civil cases. In 1907, when the first ten King's Counsel were appointed in New Zealand, Joynt was acknowledged as the senior member of the bar. He practised until shortly before his death.

He represented Kaiapoi on the Canterbury Provincial Council from 1871 until the abolition of provincial government some five years later. He served on the Canterbury Executive Council as Provincial Solicitor for 15 months under William Montgomery. He unsuccessfully stood for Parliament in 1884 election and this marked the end of his political ambitions.

== Early life ==
Joynt was born in 1830 in Dunmore, County Galway, Ireland. His parents were Thomas and Sarah Joynt (née Kennedy). He went to school in Tuam and then Dublin. He trained as a lawyer in Dublin, where he met Justice Gresson, who would later admit him as a barrister to the Supreme Court.

He married Edith Abbott, the daughter of John Abbott, on 11 June 1856 in Glasnevin. On the suggestion of Gresson, they emigrated on the Mariner to New Zealand, arriving in Wellington on 25 November 1856 after an eventful journey that resulted in several deaths. They continued on the Canterbury to Lyttelton, which was reached on 1 December.

== Legal career ==
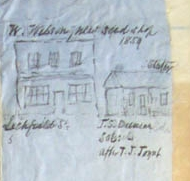
Sketch of Thomas Joynt's first office (building on right) in Lichfield Street

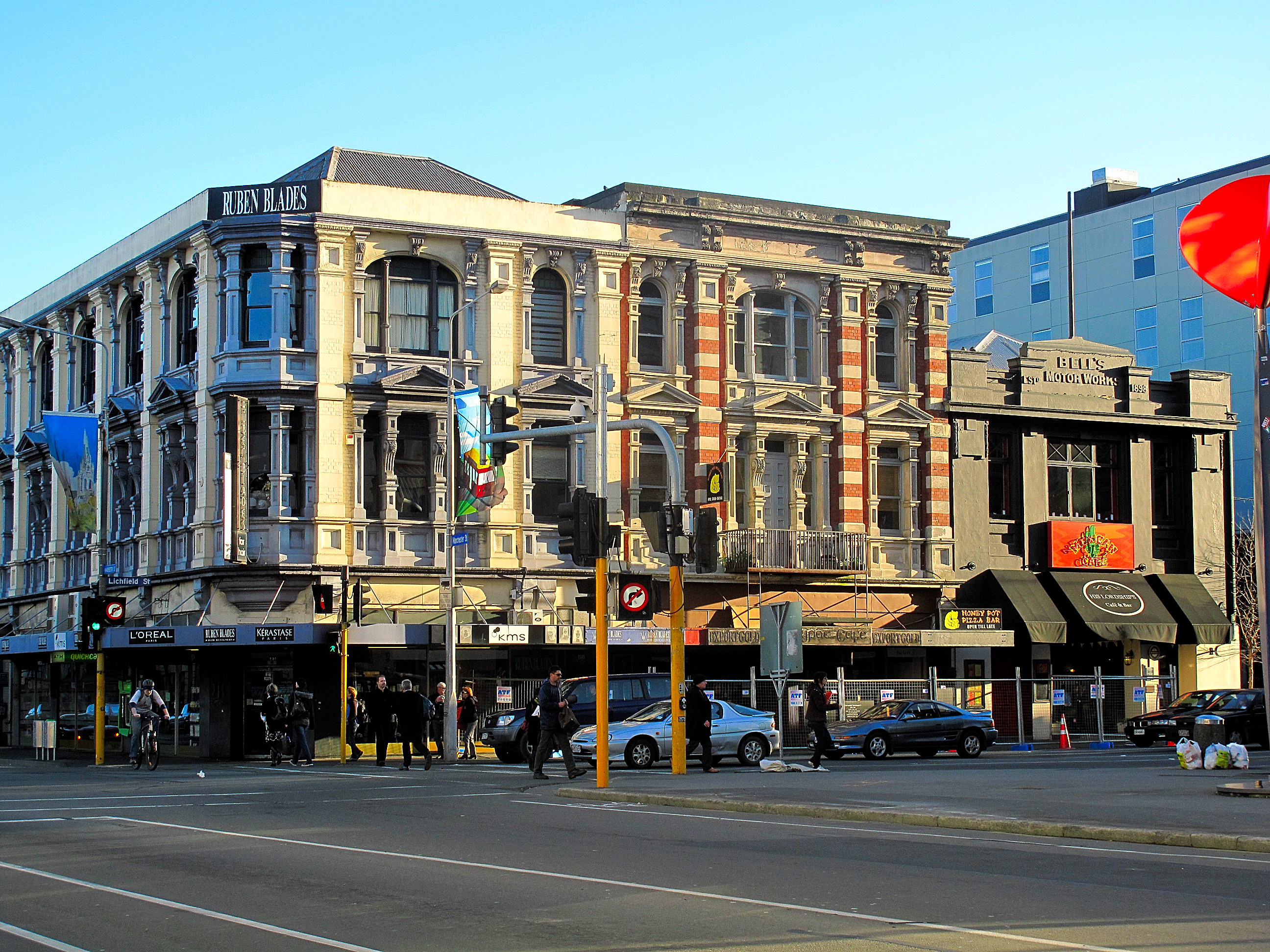
The same location in 2009, with Joynt's site occupied by the building on the right

He first worked as a law clerk in Lyttelton at the Magistrate's Court, but moved to Christchurch in 1858 to take up employment with Gresson and then with Thomas Smith Duncan. After five years with Duncan (whose law firm still exist today as Duncan Cotterill), he was admitted in 1863 as a barrister and solicitor to the Supreme Court by Gresson, and he started his own law firm.

During his legal career, he formed various partnerships. The first was with Richard Dunn Thomas, his brother-in-law, who had received his legal training from him. He then had a partnership with Allan William O'Neil, followed by one with Westby Perceval, and then with Acton Adams. The next partnership was with A C Andrews, which still existed when Joynt died.

Joynt trained others in law, and this included his brother-in-law, James Arthur Flesher, Walter Stringer (KC), James Hay, and Maurice James Gresson (an older brother of Kenneth Macfarlane Gresson; both grandsons of Justice Gresson).

The first case that made him prominent was the successful defence of Mrs Patterson and Miss Williams, who were charged with arson of their leased cafe in Cashel Street. Other prominent cases were the defence for Cedeno, the murder that happened at the house of William Robinson, and the defence of Hugh McLeod, who had murdered his wife. Joynt appeared in a large number of important civil cases, of which a Kaiapoi case in 1872 was remarkable. Joynt's client, Mr Keetley, proceeded against the Minister of Public Works, William Reeves, for compensation against losses resulting from the construction of the Main North railway line. The case was successful and considerable compensation was paid.

In June 1907, he was one of ten people appointed as the first King's Counsel in New Zealand; at the time, he was the senior member of the bar in New Zealand. He was sworn in on 12 June 1907, together with Walter Stringer, the other Canterbury appointment. On the day of his death, which occurred less than three months later, the sitting of the Magistrate's Court was adjourned as a mark of respect.

Joynt was the solicitor of the Avon Road Board for 40 years until his death. He had a close association with Robert Stout, who at the time of Joynt's death was Chief Justice.

Joynt practised until a fortnight before his death. It is said that he had an excellent command of the English language, and he drew heavily on the bible, Shakespeare, and other poets. He was quick-witted and could cite numerous quotes. In one case, argument was made whether a dog was or was not vicious. One witness described it as "gentle and amiable", whereas the other testified that it had often barked at him savagely. Joynt wryly addressed the judge:

Vox, et praeterea nihil ((in Latin) Voice and nothing more), your Honour.

He was well read and conversations with him were enjoyed by all. He was immensely proud of the progress that Canterbury had made during his time in the colony.

== Political career ==
Although not a resident of Kaiapoi, Joynt went there for business regularly and was elected unopposed on 14 June 1871 to represent the township on the Canterbury Provincial Council. He was re-elected in March 1874 and remained a member of the provincial government until its abolition on 31 October 1876. During the time of William Rolleston as Superintendent of Canterbury, William Montgomery as Provincial Secretary appointed Joynt onto the Executive Council, where he served from January 1874 to April 1875 as Provincial Solicitor.

Joynt contested the Christchurch South electorate in the 1884 election, but was beaten by the incumbent, John Holmes, with 638 votes to 600. This marked the end to Joynt's ambitions of public service; he never stood again for election after this defeat.

== Family and death ==
When the Joynts first arrived in New Zealand, they had one child. Many members of his wife's family emigrated to New Zealand after they had settled in. From 1866 to 1885, the Joynt family home was Scotstown in St Albans, which he renamed Finglas after the Dublin suburb. Scotston Avenue in St Albans commemorates the property.

His wife died in January 1881 in Sumner. Thomas Joynt died on 5 September 1907 after a short illness at his home, survived by five sons and two daughters, and was buried at Barbadoes Street Cemetery.
