= Mount Bealey =

Mountain in the Canterbury Region of New Zealand

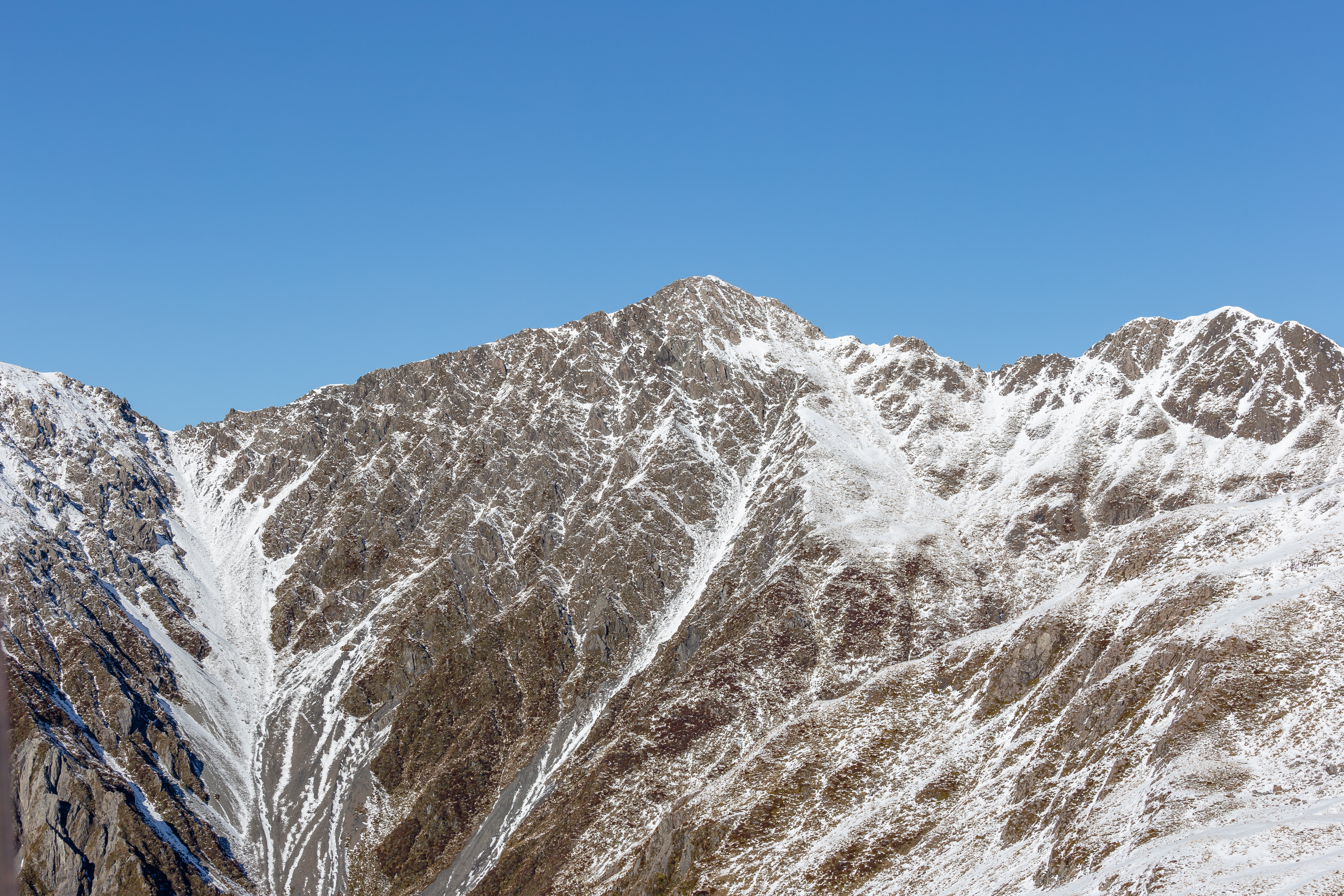
- North face

Highest point
- Elevation: 1,836 m (6,024 ft)
- Prominence: 196 m (643 ft)
- Parent peak: Mount Rolleston
- Isolation: 2.67 km (1.66 mi)
- Coordinates: 42.966368°S 171.545036°E

Naming
- Etymology: Samuel Bealey

Geography
- Location within New Zealand
- Interactive map of Mount Bealey
- Location: South Island
- Country: New Zealand
- Region: Canterbury
- Protected area: Arthur's Pass National Park
- Parent range: Southern Alps
- Topo map(s): NZMS260 K33; Topo50 BV20 813 419

Geology
- Rock age: Triassic
- Rock type: Rakaia Terrane

Mount Bealey is an 1,836-metre-elevation (6,024-foot) mountain in the Canterbury Region of New Zealand.

== Description ==
Mount Bealey is located three kilometres (1.9 mi) southwest of Arthur's Pass in Arthur's Pass National Park. It is set in the Southern Alps of the South Island. Precipitation runoff from the mountain drains west to the Crow River, and east into the Bealey River. Topographic relief is significant as the summit rises 1,130 metres (3,707 feet) above the Waimakariri River Valley in three kilometres, and 1,050 metres (3,445 feet) above the Crow Valley in 2.5 kilometres. The nearest higher peak is Mount Stewart, 4.5 kilometres to the west. The mountain's toponym honours Samuel Bealey (1821–1909), the third superintendent of the Canterbury Provincial Council.

== Climate ==
Based on the Köppen climate classification, Mount Bealey is located in a marine west coast (Cfb) climate zone. Prevailing westerly winds blow moist air from the Tasman Sea onto the mountains, where the air is forced upwards by the mountains (orographic lift), causing moisture to drop in the form of rain or snow. The months of December through February offer the most favourable weather for viewing or climbing this peak.

Climate data for Arthurs Pass Village (1991–2020 normals, extremes 1978–present)
Month	Jan	Feb	Mar	Apr	May	Jun	Jul	Aug	Sep	Oct	Nov	Dec	Year
Record high °C (°F)	32.1 (89.8)	29.5 (85.1)	26.4 (79.5)	22.5 (72.5)	17.6 (63.7)	14.0 (57.2)	12.8 (55.0)	14.3 (57.7)	20.0 (68.0)	22.5 (72.5)	26.2 (79.2)	27.6 (81.7)	32.1 (89.8)
Mean maximum °C (°F)	25.6 (78.1)	25.4 (77.7)	22.4 (72.3)	17.8 (64.0)	14.4 (57.9)	11.1 (52.0)	9.9 (49.8)	12.0 (53.6)	14.9 (58.8)	18.0 (64.4)	20.7 (69.3)	23.4 (74.1)	27.2 (81.0)
Mean daily maximum °C (°F)	18.3 (64.9)	18.6 (65.5)	16.1 (61.0)	12.7 (54.9)	9.7 (49.5)	6.7 (44.1)	6.0 (42.8)	7.6 (45.7)	9.8 (49.6)	11.7 (53.1)	13.9 (57.0)	16.5 (61.7)	12.3 (54.2)
Daily mean °C (°F)	13.3 (55.9)	13.4 (56.1)	11.2 (52.2)	8.3 (46.9)	5.8 (42.4)	3.0 (37.4)	2.2 (36.0)	3.5 (38.3)	5.5 (41.9)	7.3 (45.1)	9.3 (48.7)	11.8 (53.2)	7.9 (46.2)
Mean daily minimum °C (°F)	8.3 (46.9)	8.2 (46.8)	6.3 (43.3)	4.0 (39.2)	1.9 (35.4)	−0.6 (30.9)	−1.6 (29.1)	−0.7 (30.7)	1.3 (34.3)	3.0 (37.4)	4.7 (40.5)	7.2 (45.0)	3.5 (38.3)
Mean minimum °C (°F)	2.5 (36.5)	2.3 (36.1)	−0.4 (31.3)	−2.2 (28.0)	−3.9 (25.0)	−6.7 (19.9)	−7.5 (18.5)	−6.2 (20.8)	−4.5 (23.9)	−2.7 (27.1)	−1.4 (29.5)	1.3 (34.3)	−8.3 (17.1)
Record low °C (°F)	−1.0 (30.2)	−1.5 (29.3)	−8.5 (16.7)	−7.8 (18.0)	−7.5 (18.5)	−11.5 (11.3)	−12.5 (9.5)	−11.0 (12.2)	−8.2 (17.2)	−6.1 (21.0)	−5.0 (23.0)	−1.4 (29.5)	−12.5 (9.5)
Average rainfall mm (inches)	413.5 (16.28)	272.6 (10.73)	321.2 (12.65)	370.3 (14.58)	395.0 (15.55)	378.1 (14.89)	328.4 (12.93)	353.0 (13.90)	452.5 (17.81)	489.4 (19.27)	438.6 (17.27)	447.7 (17.63)	4,660.3 (183.49)
Average relative humidity (%)	77	78	82	86	88	90	88	87	84	81	78	78	83
Source 1: NIWA
Source 2: "Arthur's Pass – Weather Database"

== Climbing ==
Climbing routes:

- Via Mount Bealey Track
- Via Rough Creek

== See also ==
- List of mountains of New Zealand by height
