= Magazine Bay (Canterbury) =

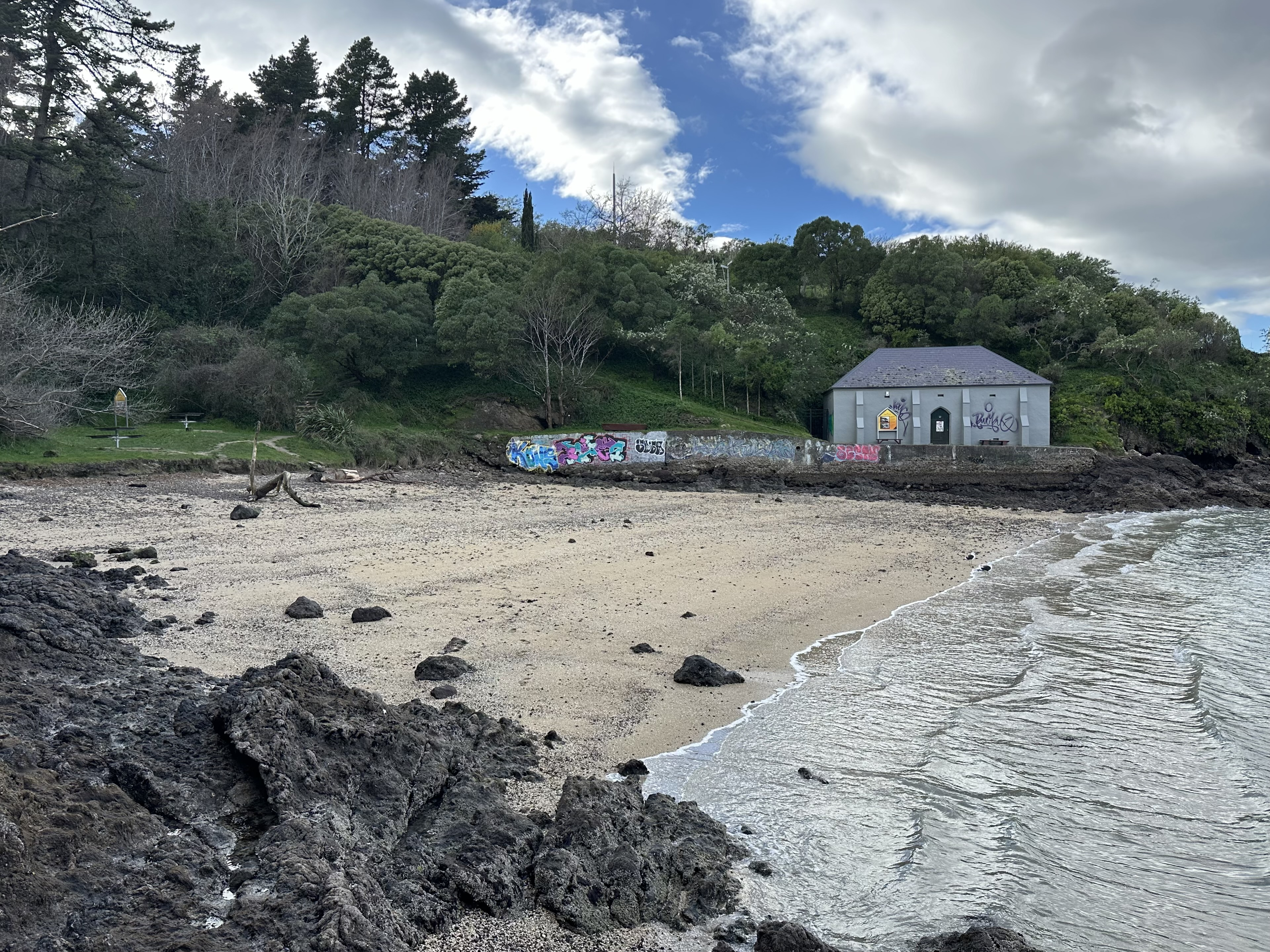
- Interactive map of Magazine Bay
- Coordinates: 43°36′36″S 172°42′11″E
- Type: Bay
- Part of: Lyttelton Harbour

Magazine Bay (Māori: Tāpoa) is a small bay in Lyttelton Harbour in the South Island of New Zealand. It is located to the west of the Naval Point reclamation, between the inner harbour of the Port of Lyttelton, and Corsair Bay. The bay takes its name from the 1874 powder magazine building located above the shoreline. The magazine is a Category 1 listed Historic Place. Prior to 1900 the bay was the location of a shipyard, and a shed and slipway for a torpedo boat. A gun emplacement was constructed in 1890 on the headland at Erskine Point above the magazine.

Magazine Bay was proposed as the location for a small boat harbour on multiple occasions over the years from 1920 to the 1970s, but none of the proposals went ahead because of the high costs of establishing a conventional breakwater to provide protection from southerly gales. In 1979, the Harbour Board conducted tests on a floating breakwater made from car tyres, and in 1982 opened a boat marina protected by a 300-metre-long (980 ft) floating breakwater. The breakwater was wrecked in a severe southerly storm in October 2000, and more than 30 small boats were sunk. The Magazine Bay marina was eventually demolished in 2023 as part of a development project at Naval Point, to the east of the bay.

== Toponymy ==
The Māori name of the bay is Tāpoa, meaning 'wind swirling around'. The earliest European name given to the area is Bakers Bay, but the bay has been known by several other names including Brownings, Erskine, Flea, Grubbs, and Senior. The bay is referred to as Magazine Bay in sources from around 1920, and this name is the current official name recognised by the New Zealand Geographic Board.

== Geography ==
Magazine Bay is located to the west of the Naval Point reclamation, between the inner harbour of the Port of Lyttelton, and Corsair Bay. It is surrounded by volcanic cliffs. There is no public vehicle access to Magazine Bay and no car park. However, there is walking access off Park Terrace, and a walking track from Corsair Bay. There is also a steep track from the rear of the Naval Point Yacht Club.

== History ==
In the 1860s, the bay was used as a convenient place to offload livestock directly from a ship, rather than from a wharf in the inner harbour. The Grubb & Co shipyard and slipway operated in the bay from 1874 through until at least 1897.

=== Magazine (1874) ===
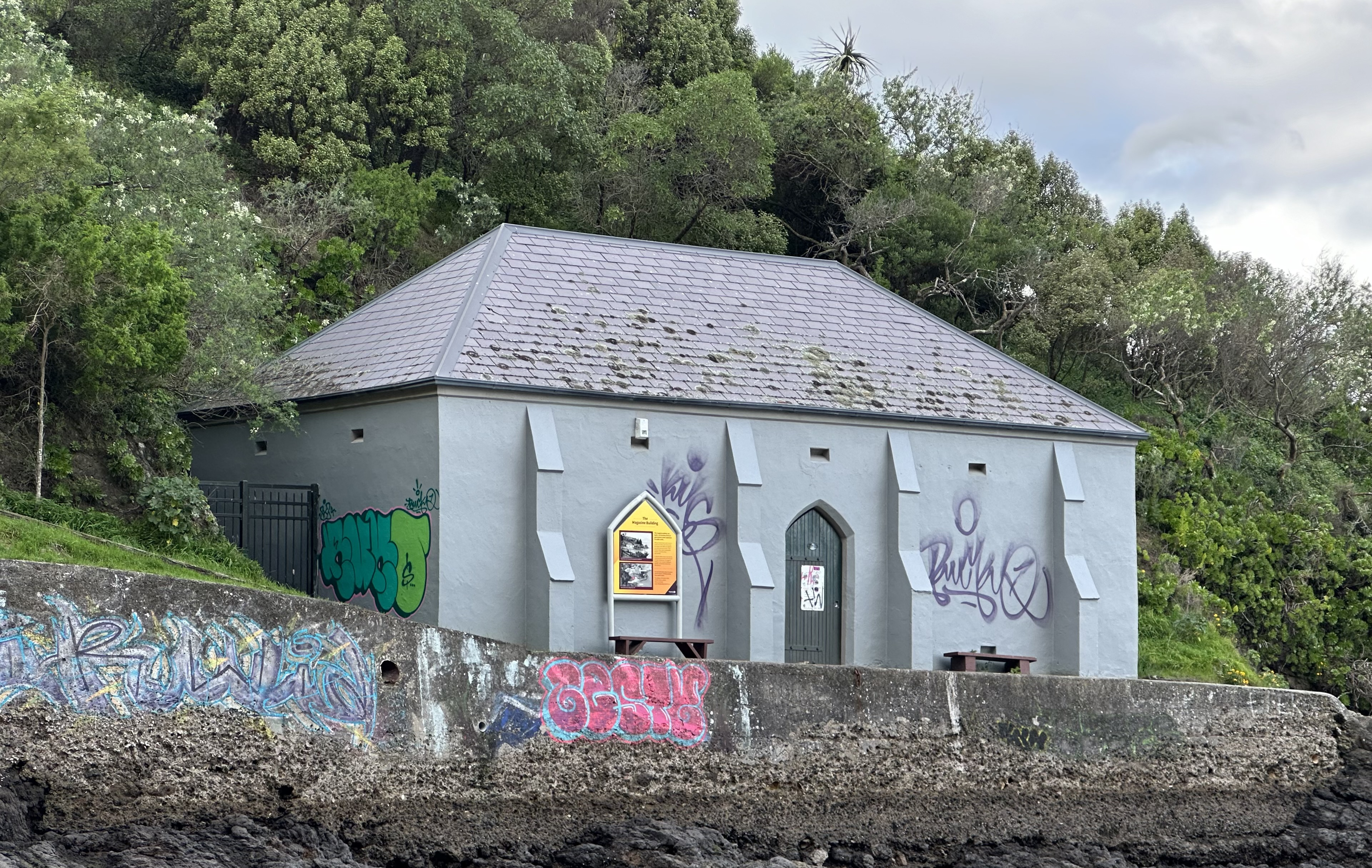
The 1874 powder magazine building at Magazine Bay, Lyttelton

In January 1874, the Canterbury Provincial Council approved an estimate of £575 for construction of a powder magazine and jetty in the bay. Tenders for construction were called in February. The building was completed by November 1874, and was used for the storage of black powder, ammunition, and explosives for use in the construction of roads and railways. In 1875, tenders were called for the construction of a cottage for the keeper of the magazine. In 1875, the bay was designated as a public domain for recreation purposes. The keeper of the powder magazine was made responsible for the domain.

Military ammunition was stored in the magazine until 1945. In 1995, the magazine and its associated seawall were listed as a Category 1 Historic Place.

The roof frame of the magazine building and its slate roof tiles were stolen at some point. However, as part of restoration of the magazine building by Project Port Lyttelton in 1999, the roof was replaced using slate tiles imported from the same quarry in Wales where the original tiles had been made.

=== Lyttelton torpedo boat shed (1885) ===
A spar torpedo boat, HMS Defender built by John I. Thornycroft & Company in 1883 arrived in Lyttelton in 1884, to assist in the defence of the port. A boat shed to house the torpedo boat was built in the bay and completed in May 1885. The torpedo boat shed and its slipway was located between the workshop and slipway operated by Grubb & Co. The torpedo boat was never used in defence of the port, and it was sold in 1900. The hull was abandoned at Purau. In 1993, a group of local enthusiasts located the remains of the boat. In 2003 a small museum was established in the magazine building to house and display the remains of the torpedo boat. The Lyttelton Torpedo Boat Museum Charitable Trust has held a lease on the magazine building since 2004.

=== Erskine Point gun emplacement (1890) ===
A gun emplacement was built in 1890 at Erskine Point on the headland above the east side of Magazine Bay. The gun was a seven-inch, seven-ton, rifled muzzle-loader. It was transferred to the site from a gun emplacement at Wellington Botanic Gardens. The gun emplacement was decommissioned by 1905, and stripped for salvage in the 1930s.

=== Marina ===
Magazine Bay was proposed as a location for a small boat marina as early as 1920. In 1931, the Lyttelton Harbour Board reviewed a proposal for establishing a harbour for small boats, outside of the existing inner harbour. One of the options considered was in Magazine Bay. The estimated cost of establishing the boat harbour was £132,000. A further proposal was raised in 1947, as a response to the shortage of available moorings for small craft in the inner harbour. The depth of soft mud in the area proposed for the marina would require large quantities of rubble to create a breakwater. In 1959, the Harbour Board stated that it would not provide additional moorings for small yachts and launches, because of the capital cost. It noted that while Magazine Bay had the potential for small boat moorings, the exposure to southerly gales would require costly protection works. A proposal for a small boat harbour at Magazine Bay was raised again in 1964, but the Harbour Board indicated it was not in a position to proceed at that time. Timber piling was tested as a cheap form of breakwater, but this was not found to be practical in the Lyttelton conditions.

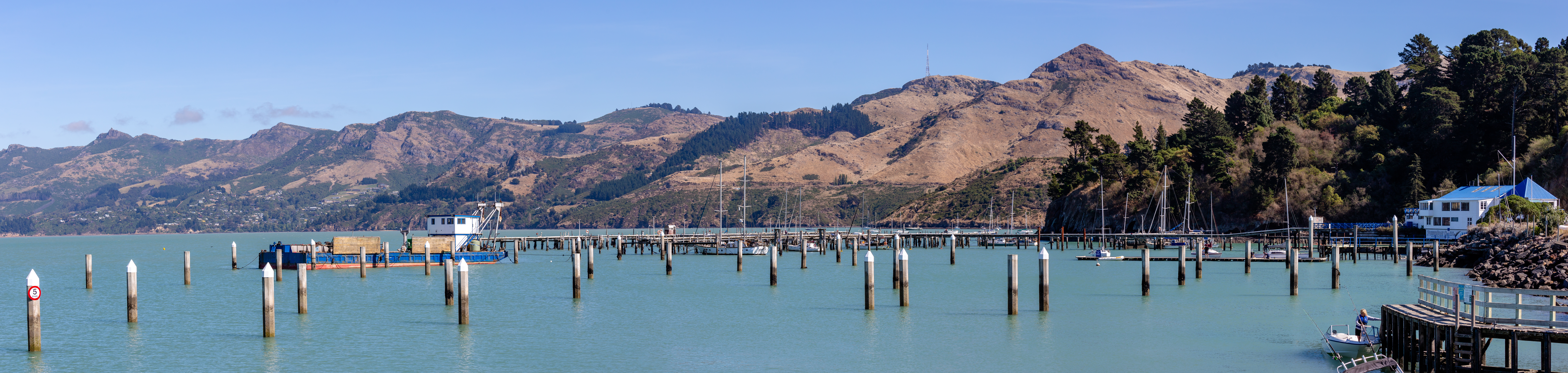
View towards Tāpoa/ Erskine Point and the Magazine Bay marina in 2019

In 1979, the Harbour Board undertook testing of a floating breakwater made from tyres near Magazine Bay, as a more economic solution than a conventional breakwater. In September 1980, the Harbour Board reported on the performance of the experimental floating-tyre breakwater, and forecast that berths in a planned marina at at Magazine Bay could become available by early 1982. The marina was officially opened on 17 November 1982. It was partially complete at the time, with provision for 82 berths, and was protected by a 300-metre-long (980 ft) floating breakwater made from tyres filled with polystyrene foam. The marina development was intended to expand to ultimately accommodate 238 berths.

On 13 October 2000, the Magazine Bay marina was wrecked in a severe southerly storm, and more than 30 small boats were sunk. Total losses were estimated at $8 million. Wreckage from the floating breakwater was retrieved and left at Naval Point for almost two decades, leading to polystyrene degrading and being lost into the environment. Work to remove the wreckage from the Naval Point site commenced in 2020.

In 2020, as part the development of the Naval Point – Te Nukutai o Tapoa multi-use facilities, the Banks Peninsula Community Board requested the closure of the Magazine Bay marina. Demolition commenced in September 2023.
