= Caduceus (disambiguation) =

Caduceus is the ancient symbol of messengers, often confused with the medical symbol the Rod of Asclepius.

Caduceus may also refer to:

- Caduceus as a symbol of medicine
- CADUCEUS (expert system), the medical expert system
- Caduceus (horse), The New Zealand racehorse and trotting champion
- Caduceus (ship), The 19th century convict ship
- Caduceus Cellars, The winery
- HMS Caduceus
- Caduceus Clay, a fictional firbolg cleric in the D&D Web Series Critical Role
- NASA's name for a hypothetical moon of Mercury in a 2012 April Fool's Day joke
- Super Surgical Operation: Caduceus, a video game (called Trauma Center: Under the Knife in the American edition) for the Nintendo DS
