= John Cass (disambiguation) =

John Cass (1661–1718) was a British merchant and politician.

Sir John Cass may also refer to:

- Sir John Cass's Foundation, an education charity in London
- Cass Business School, the former name of The Business School at City, University of London
- Sir John Cass (19th century), merchant and father of Annie Pearson, Viscountess Cowdray
- John Cass (1813–1889), master mariner and Captain of the Caduceus

== See also ==
- John Kass, American columnist
