= Henry Barnes Gresson =

New Zealand judge (1809–1901)

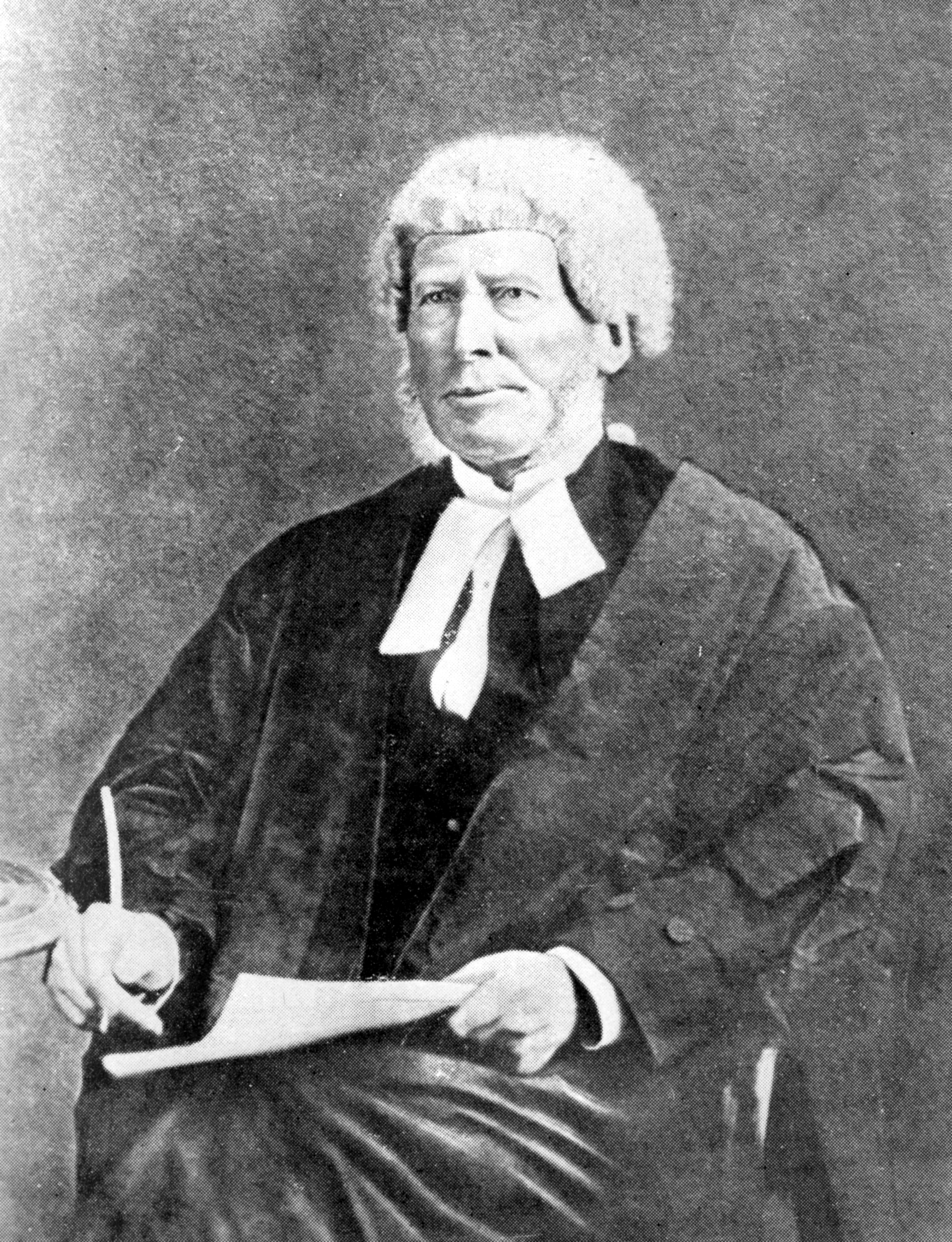
- Justice Gresson in circa 1862

2nd chairman of the board of Governors of Canterbury College
- In office 1875–1875
- Preceded by: Joshua Williams
- Succeeded by: William Montgomery

Personal details
- Born: 31 January 1809 County Meath, Ireland
- Died: 31 January 1901 (aged 92) Fendalton, Christchurch, New Zealand
- Relations: Kenneth Macfarlane Gresson (grandson)

Henry Barnes Gresson (31 January 1809 – 31 January 1901) was a New Zealand judge.

== Early life ==
Gresson was born in 1809 in County Meath, Ireland. His father, Rev George Leslie Gresson, was rector of Ardnurcher in County Westmeath. His mother was Clarissa Gresson (née Reynell). Gresson was home schooled until age 14, then attended a private school in Westmeath for three years. He matriculated from Trinity College, Dublin and practised in Dublin for eight years. Together with his colleague Edward Hartson Burroughs, he published a book on Irish equity pleading.

He married Anne Beatty in 1845, the daughter of Andrew Beatty of Derry.

== New Zealand ==
The family emigrated on the Egmont to Auckland, arriving on 24 June 1854. A month later, they arrived in Lyttelton on the steamer Nelson. The family made their way over the Bridle Path on foot to their home in Christchurch, but their luggage was shipped and lost on the Sumner bar, including Gresson's legal library.

In October 1854, the Executive Council of the Canterbury Provincial Council led by Henry Tancred resigned, and Gresson was appointed onto the new executive as provincial solicitor. He served on various executive councils under the leadership of John Hall (1854–1855), Joseph Brittan (1855), Tancred (1855–1857 and 1857–1858), Richard Packer (1867), Charles Bowen (1867), and Thomas Cass (1867). He was never an elected member of the provincial council.

Gresson was one of the initial 23 members of the Board of Governors of Canterbury College from 1873 to 1876. In 1875, he was the board's second chairman.

Gresson was committed to the Anglican church. He worked towards the erection of ChristChurch Cathedral, belonged to the diocesan synod for many years, and served as a chancellor of the Christchurch diocese.

Soon after his arrival in Christchurch, Gresson was appointed Crown Prosecutor, but resigned from that post and his provincial roles when he was appointed acting judge in 1857 for the South Island. Prior to that, Justice Sidney Stephen sometimes visited the South Island in judicial matters. The third judge in New Zealand at the time was Daniel Wakefield. Both Stephen and Wakefield were in poor health in late 1857, and they died within days of one another: Wakefield on 8 January 1858 in Wellington, and Stephen five days later in Auckland. That left Gresson as New Zealand's sole judge until the arrival of Chief Justice George Arney later in the following month, and eight months before a second puisne judge, Alexander James Johnston, was appointed.

On 4 September 1858, Governor Thomas Gore Browne appointed Gresson judge of the Supreme Court. He travelled by horseback with the help of a Māori guide. After gold was found in Central Otago, a separate judge was appointed for the area south of the Waitaki River. Further boundary adjustments followed and in the end, Gresson's area of jurisdiction was for Canterbury only.

Following an enquiry into the conduct of the justice for Otago, Henry Samuel Chapman, Parliament passed a resolution that allowed the Minister of Justice to order judges to move to a different court. This would have required Gresson to be transferred to Nelson, to which he objected in the strongest terms. Gresson led the opposition of New Zealand's judges to this interference and even went to Wellington, but to no avail. In early 1875, three of New Zealand's five judges resigned over this affair: Gresson, Chapman, and Chief Justice Arney. Gresson explained his objection in the following words:

What becomes of the independence of the Judges if they may be ordered by the Minister of the day, as often as he pleases, to remove to whatever part of the colony he pleases? It is obvious that such a power is open to gross abuse, and that if these be the terms on which they hold office, the Judges are not better off than when their commission was only during pleasure.

Gresson's strong stance has since been the acknowledged reason for maintaining the independence of the New Zealand judiciary.

Gresson went to Ireland and England in 1876. Upon his return, Gresson turned to farming. He sold his farm in Woodend in 1891 and retired to Fendalton.

== Death and family ==
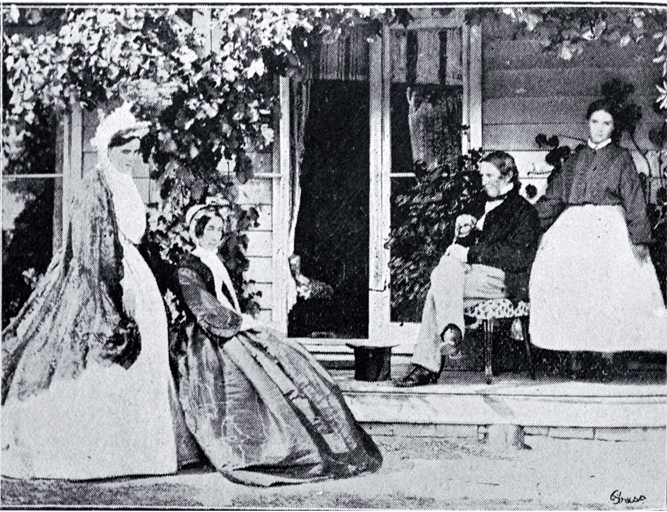
Justice Gresson with his wife and his two daughters in 1865. His son was studying at Cambridge University at the time.

The Gressons had three children: two girls and one boy. John Beatty Gresson, his son, was born on 25 September 1848. He was educated at Christ's College, Christchurch and the University of Cambridge. Kenneth Macfarlane Gresson (born 1891) was his grandson.

Justice Gresson was the patriarch of one of two dominant Canterbury families of lawyers; the other patriarch was Thomas S. Weston.

At first, the Gresson family lived in a rented house in Madras Street, and Gressons Lane off Madras Street in the central city commemorates him. They then lived in Oxford Terrace East, from where Gresson began his legal work. For many years, their residence was on the corner of Worcester and Manchester Streets. Gresson's country property, which he bought in 1864, was in a locality called Waiora between Woodend and Rangiora, and the street names Waiora Lane and Gressons Road refer to this. In 1867, Gresson bought the farm 'Gresford' of Samuel Bealey; it was located north of Bealey Avenue and east of Madras Street. Gresford Street in the suburb of Edgeware is named for that property. Gresford Estate was subdivided into 127 lots and sold in 1901.

His wife died on 11 June 1889 and was buried in Woodend. His son John died in 1891 in a railway accident.

Gresson died at his home in Fendalton on 31 January 1901 on his birthday. He was buried at St Barnabas churchyard in Woodend next to his wife. Parishioners from Woodend built a lychgate to commemorate the judge. His daughter Henrietta died in 1918.

== Bibliography ==
- Burroughs, Edward Hartson; Gresson, Henry Barnes (1850). The Irish Equity Pleader: Being a Collection of Forms of Bills in Equity Suits in Ireland, with Preliminary Dissertations and Practical Notes. Dublin: Hodges and Smith.

== Notes ==
Academic offices
Preceded by Joshua Williams	Chairman of the Board of Governors of Canterbury College; 1875	Succeeded by William Montgomery
