= Ginevra =

Ginevra may refer to:

- Ginevra (given name), a variant spelling of the given name Juniper
- Ginevra, the Italian form of Geneva
- Ginevra, an 1882 poem by Samuel Rogers relating the Legend of the Mistletoe Bough
  - Ginèvra; or, The Old Oak Chest, A Christmas Story by Susan Wallace, based on the same story
- Ginevra, a lyric drama written in 1913 by the Esperantist Edmond Privat
- Ginevra (horse), winner of the 1972 Oaks Stakes
- Ginevra, a 1992 German film starring Amanda Ooms and Serge Maggiani
- "Ginevra", a 2025 song by Italian rapper Luchè featuring Geolier

== See also ==
- Guinevere (disambiguation)
