= Mount Stewart (New Zealand) =

Mountain in the Canterbury Region of New Zealand

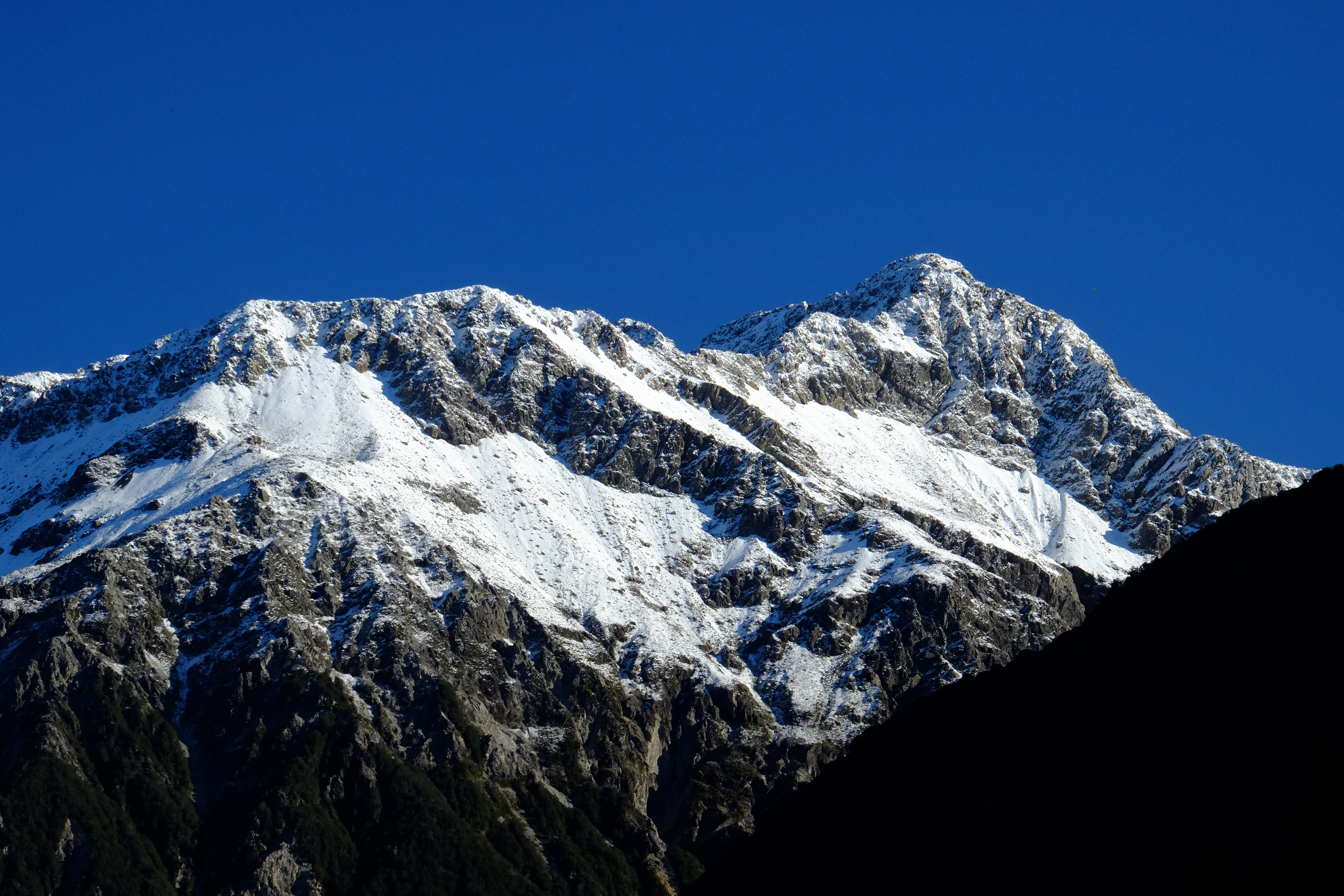
- Southeast aspect

Highest point
- Elevation: 1,934 m (6,345 ft)
- Prominence: 140 m (459 ft)
- Parent peak: Mount Rolleston
- Coordinates: 42.96669°S 171.49080°E

Geography
- Location within New Zealand
- Interactive map of Mount Stewart
- Location: South Island
- Country: New Zealand
- Region: Canterbury
- Protected area: Arthur's Pass National Park
- Parent range: Southern Alps; Jellicoe Ridge
- Topo map: NZMS260 K33

Geology
- Rock age: Triassic
- Rock type: Rakaia Terrane

Climbing
- First ascent: 1927

Mount Stewart is a 1,934-metre-elevation (6,345-foot) mountain in the Canterbury Region of New Zealand.

== Description ==
Mount Stewart is located 119 kilometres (74 mi) northwest of Christchurch in Arthur's Pass National Park. It is set at the southern end of Jellicoe Ridge in the Southern Alps of the South Island. Precipitation runoff from the mountain's north and east slopes drains to the Crow River, whereas the south and west slopes drain into the Waimakariri River. Topographic relief is significant as the summit rises 1,210 metres (3,970 feet) above the Waimakariri River Valley in 2.5 kilometres, and 1,150 metres (3,773 feet) above the Crow Valley in 1.5 kilometres. The nearest higher peak is Mount Guinevere, 2.1 kilometres to the north.

== Climate ==
Based on the Köppen climate classification, Mount Stewart is located in a marine west coast (Cfb) climate zone. Prevailing westerly winds blow moist air from the Tasman Sea onto the mountains, where the air is forced upwards by the mountains (orographic lift), causing moisture to drop in the form of rain or snow. The months of December through February offer the most favourable weather for viewing or climbing this peak.

== Climbing ==
The first ascent of the summit was made in 1927 by R.R. Chester, I.W. Tucker, C.W. Evans, and A.H. Candy via the Southeast Ridge.

Climbing routes:

- South East Ridge
- North East Ridge
- From the West
- Via Lower Crow River

== Gallery ==
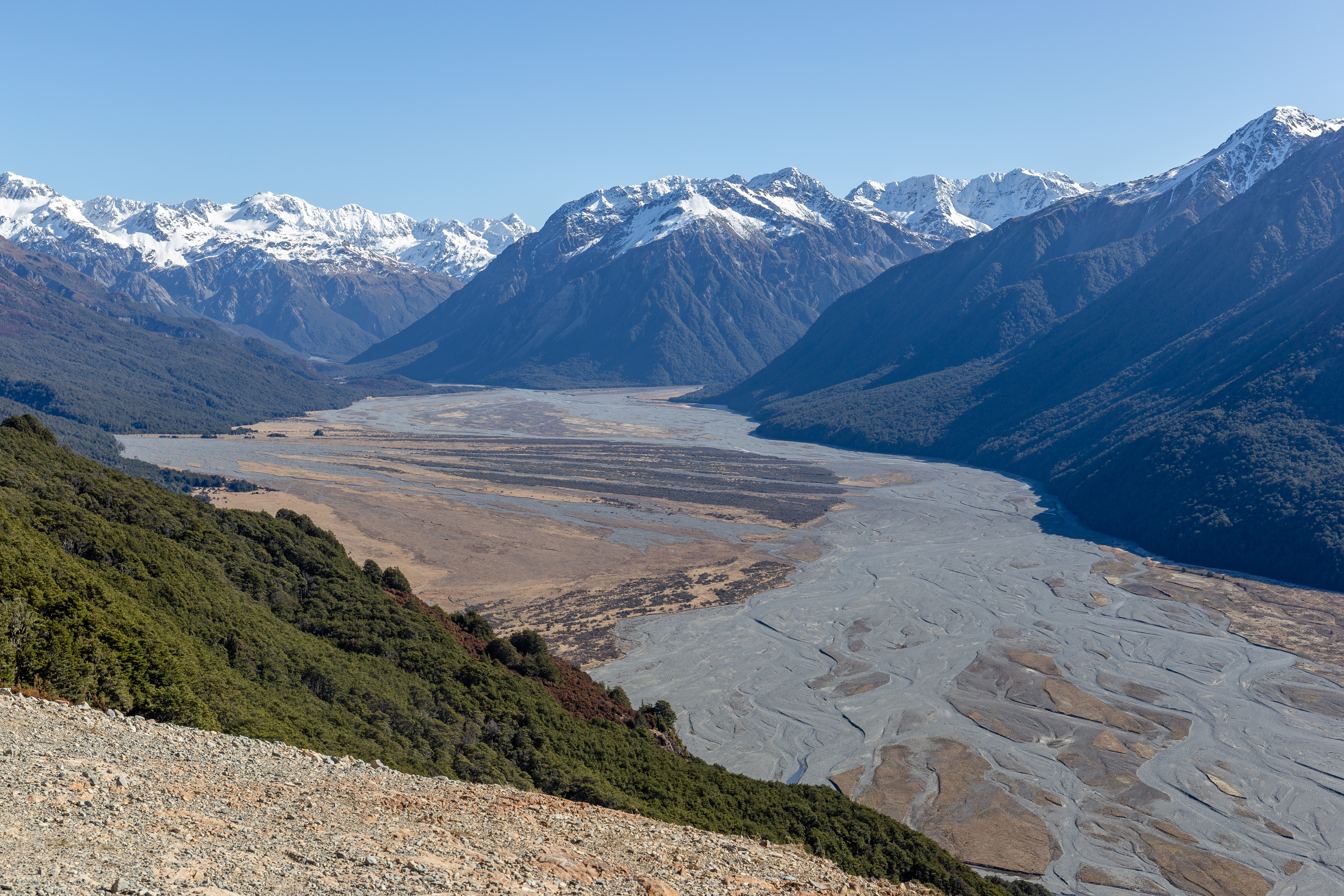
Mount Stewart centred on skyline

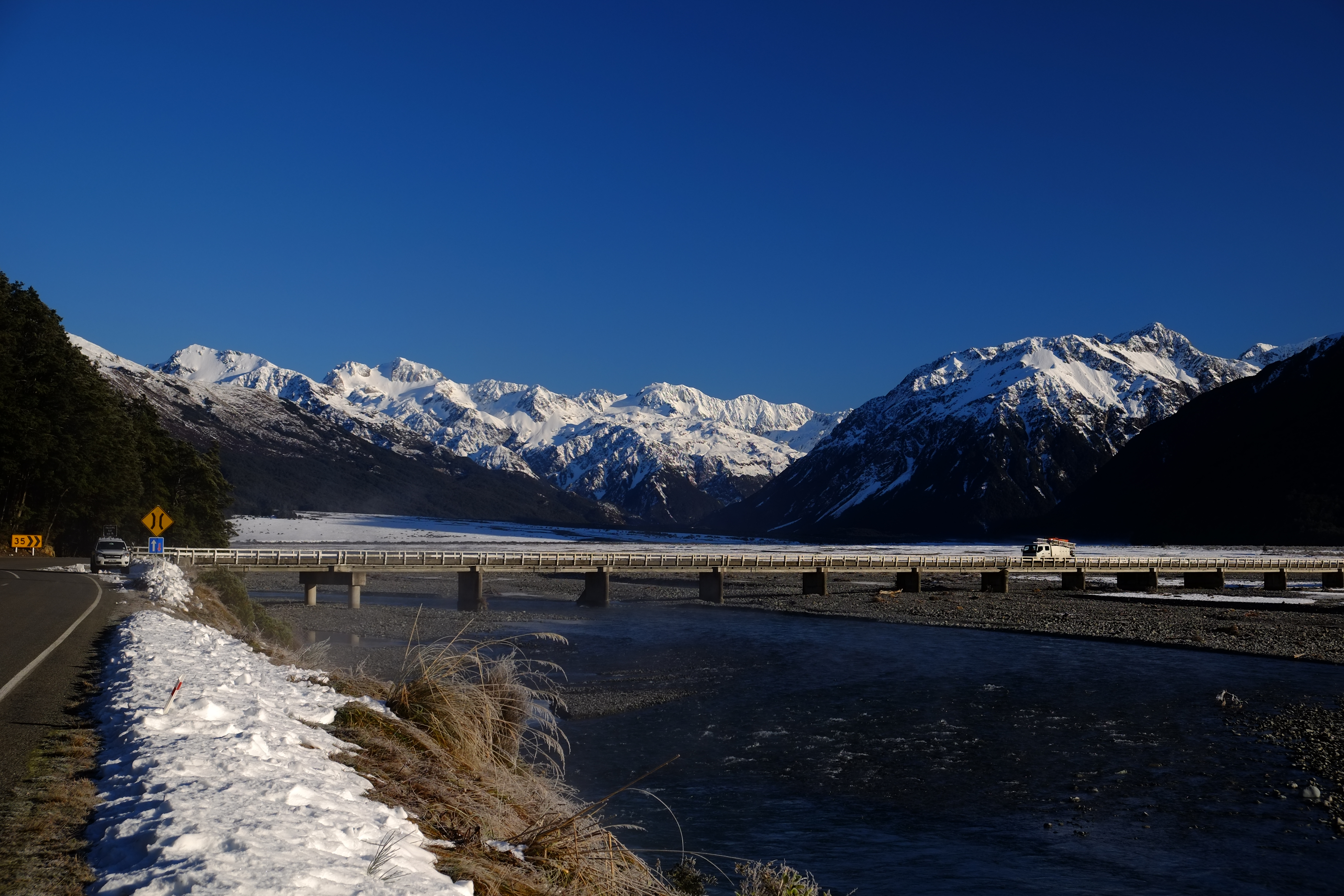
Mount Stewart to right

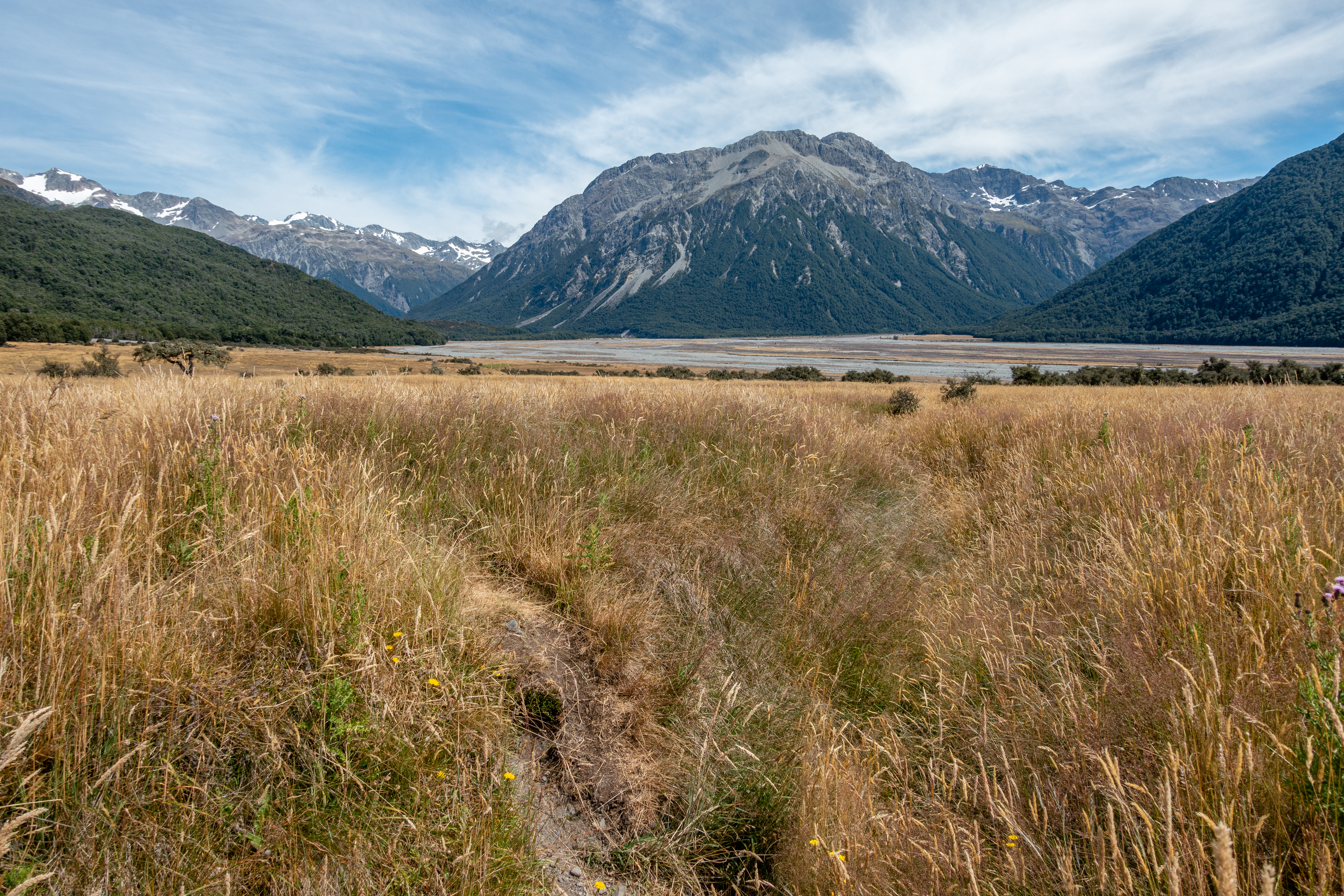
Mount Stewart right of centre

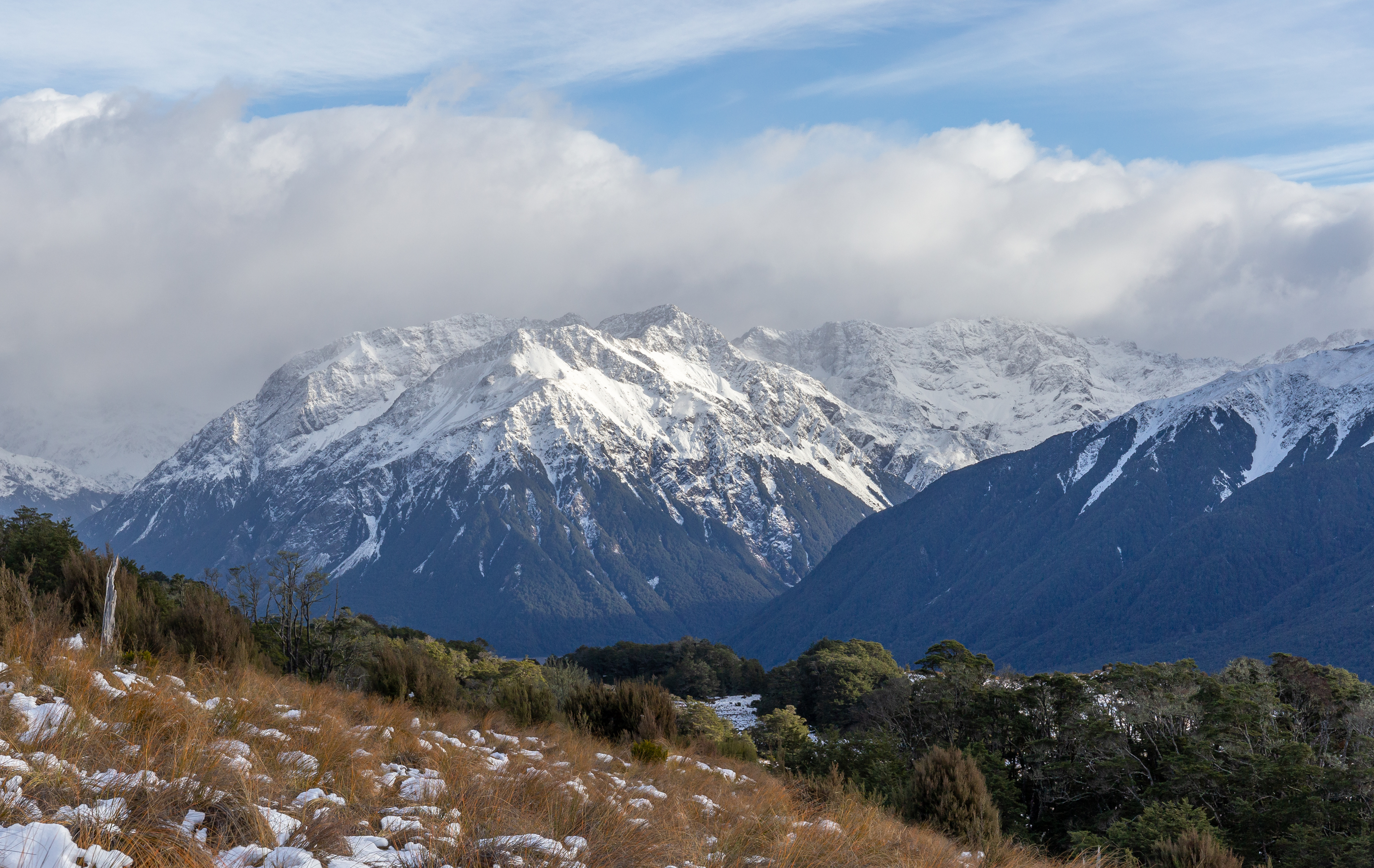
Mount Stewart from Bealey Spur Track

== See also ==
- List of mountains of New Zealand by height
