= Guinevere (disambiguation) =

Guinevere is the queen of Camelot in the Arthurian legend.

Guinevere may also refer to:

== Arts and entertainment ==
- Guinevere (1999 film), an American drama film
- Guinevere (1994 film), a television movie about the legendary queen
- Guenevere, Queen of the Summer Country, a novel by Rosalind Miles
- Guinevere, a 2001 play by Gina Gionfriddo
- "Guinevere" (song), a 1966 song performed by Donovan
- "Guinevere", a 2010 song by the Eli Young Band from Jet Black & Jealous
- Guinevere Jones, the title character of a Canadian/Australian fantasy television series and a series of four novels
- Guinivere, the princess of Bern from Fire Emblem: The Binding Blade
- Guinevere, a van from the 2020 film Onward
- Guinevere trilogy, a novel sequence by Persia Woolley

== People ==
- Guinevere Kauffmann (born 1968), American astrophysicist
- Dame Guinevere Tilney (1916–1997), British political activist
- Guinevere Turner (born 1968), American actress, screenwriter, and film director
- Guinevere Van Seenus (born 1977), American model, photographer and jewelry designer

== Other uses ==
- Mount Guinevere, a mountain in New Zealand
- USS Guinevere (SP-512), a patrol vessel commissioned in 1917 and wrecked in 1918
- USS Guinevere (IX-67), a patrol vessel in commission from 1942 to 1945
- 2483 Guinevere, an asteroid

== See also ==
- Guinevere Castle, a peak in the Grand Canyon
- Guinevere Planitia, a lowland region of the planet Venus
- Guenhwyvar, a panther from Dungeons & Dragons
- "Guinnevere", a song written by David Crosby on the 1969 album Crosby, Stills & Nash
- Gwenevere, the title character in Princess Gwenevere and the Jewel Riders
- Jennifer (given name), a Cornish variation of the name
- Gwenhwyfar (12th century), a daughter of Dafydd ab Owain Gwynedd and Emma of Anjou
- Gwynevere, Princess of Sunlight, a non-player character in the video game Dark Souls
