= Cass River (Selwyn District) =

Coordinates: 43°0′37″S 171°45′22″E

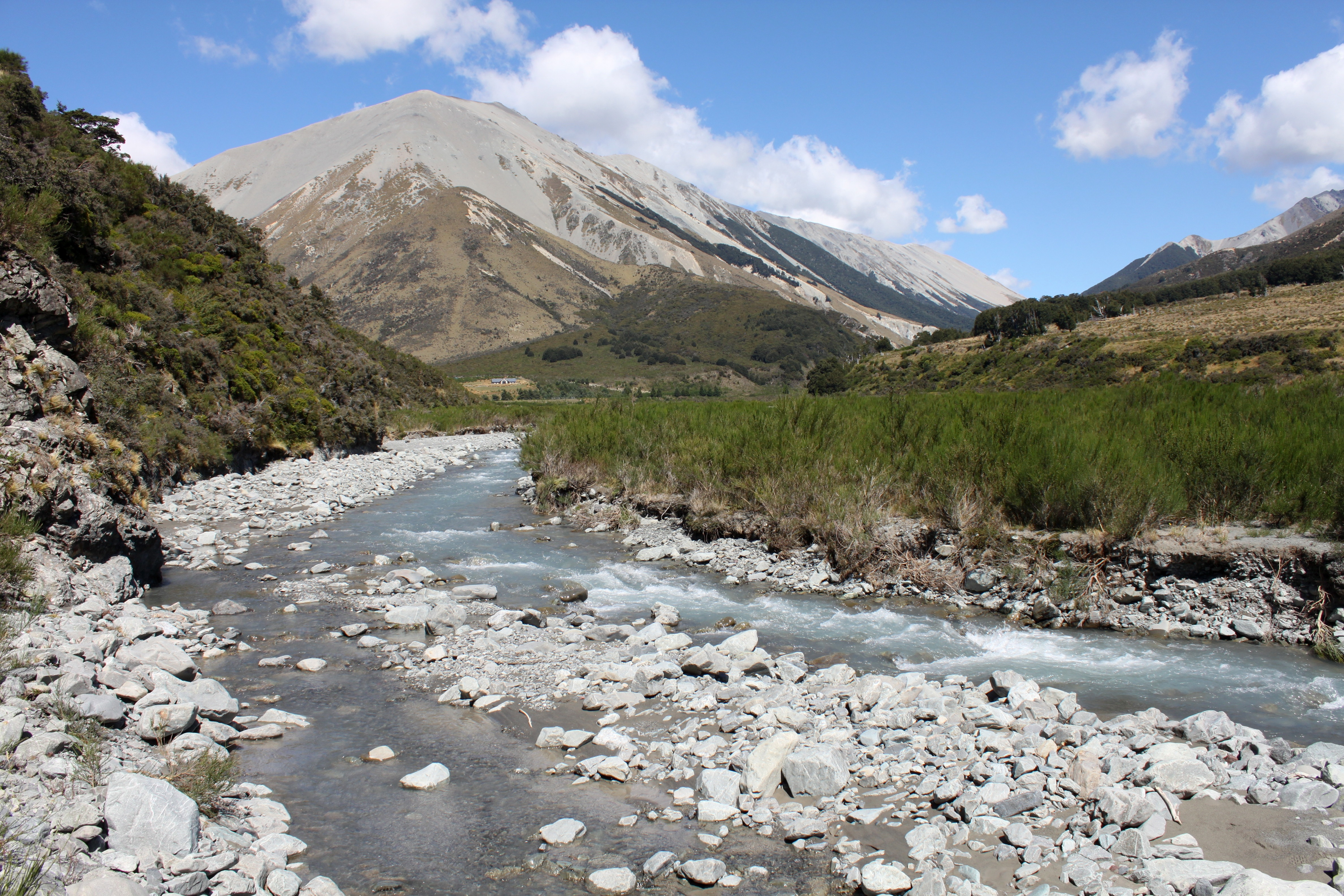
- The Cass River in the Southern Alps

Location
- Country: New Zealand

Physical characteristics
- Source
  - elevation: 1,540 m (5,050 ft)
- Mouth
  - location: Waimakariri River
  - elevation: 525 m (1,722 ft)
- Length: 13 km (8.1 mi)

The Cass River is an alpine river in the Canterbury region of the South Island of New Zealand. It rises near the Cass Saddle in the Craigieburn Forest Park and flows generally northeast alongside the Craigieburn Range before turning north to meet the Waimakariri River. State Highway 73 and the Midland Line both cross the lower reaches of the river near a farming locality named Cass.

A local landowner, P&E Ltd, applied to divert water from the Cass River and irrigate 550 hectares (1,400 acres) of high country land near Lake Grassmere. The consent was declined in March 2013 commissioners acting for Environment Canterbury for "potential impact on landscape values and water quality".

The river, railway station and settlement are named after Thomas Cass, chief surveyor of Canterbury Province from 1851 to 1867.
