= Charles Wyatt (politician) =

New Zealand politician

Charles William Wyatt was a New Zealand solicitor and politician. He practised as a solicitor in Christchurch, then in 1851 became a Canterbury Provincial Councillor for Avon. He held that position until 1861, being an executive member in 1859.
