= 1958 New Year Honours (New Zealand) =

Annual awards for New Zealanders

The 1958 New Year Honours in New Zealand were appointments by Elizabeth II on the advice of the New Zealand government to various orders and honours to reward and highlight good works by New Zealanders. The awards celebrated the passing of 1957 and the beginning of 1958, and were announced on 1 January 1958.

The recipients of honours are displayed here as they were styled before their new honour.

== Knight Bachelor ==
- William Edward Hale CBE – of Turua. For services to the dairy industry, particularly as chairman of the Dairy Board, 1938–1957.
- Ernest Marsden CMG CBE MC – of Wellington. For services to science.
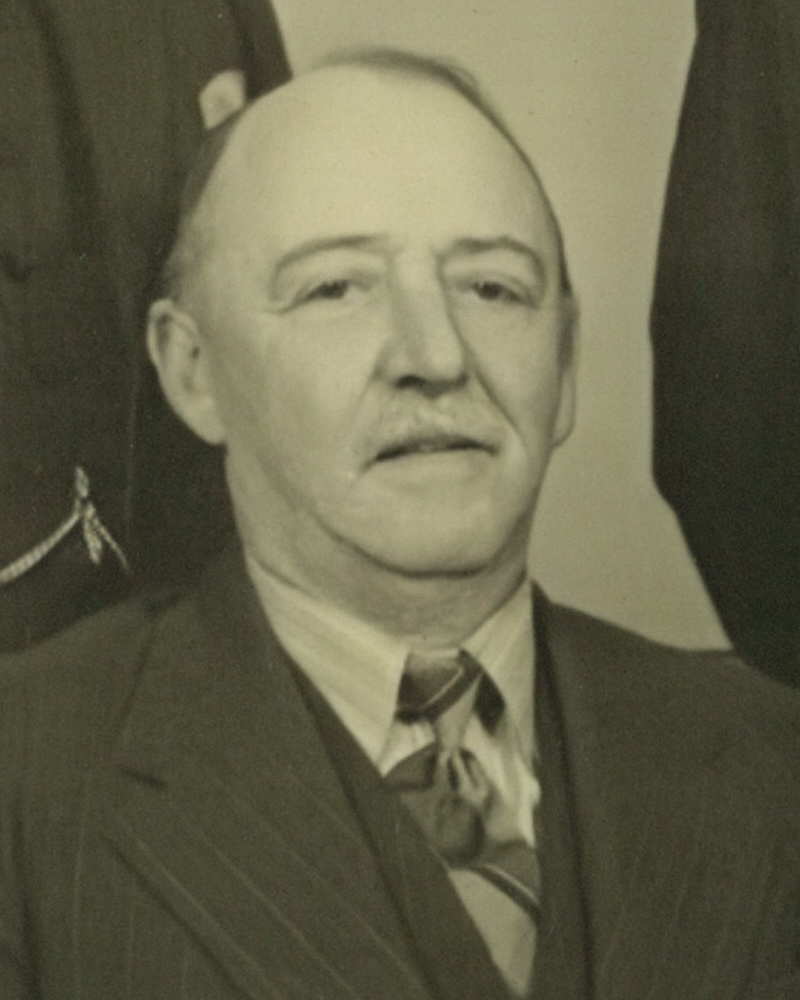
Sir William Hale

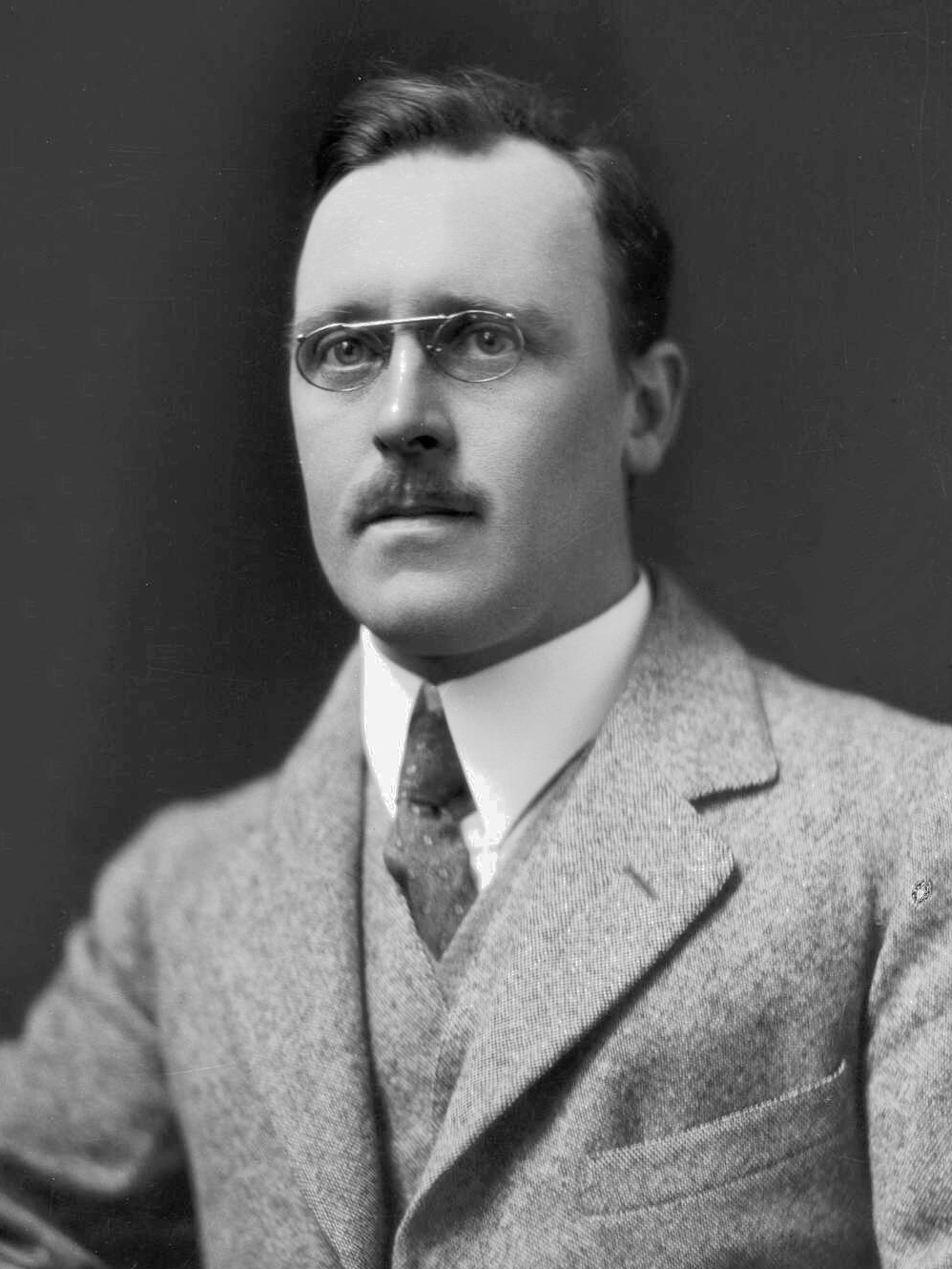
Sir Ernest Marsden

== Order of the Bath ==
=== Companion (CB) ===
Military division

- Air Vice-Marshal Cyril Eyton Kay CBE DFC – Royal New Zealand Air Force.

== Order of Saint Michael and Saint George ==
=== Companion (CMG) ===
- Donald Dixon McKenzie MB ChB – senior surgeon, Auckland Public Hospital.

== Order of the British Empire ==
=== Knight Commander (KBE) ===
Civil division

- The Honourable Kenneth Macfarlane Gresson – of Wellington; president of the New Zealand Court of Appeal.

=== Commander (CBE) ===
Civil division

- John Peter Douglas Johnsen – of Wellington; formerly comptroller of Customs.
- The Honourable John Thomas Paul JP – of Wellington; formerly a member of the Legislative Council. For services in the fields of journalism and government.
- Ernest Dawson Wilkinson – of Papatoetoe; a public accountant.

Military division

- Captain George Raymond Davis-Goff DSC – Royal New Zealand Navy.
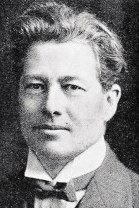
Tom Paul

=== Officer (OBE) ===
Civil division

- Doreen Annie Grace Bray JP – of Papatoetoe. For social welfare services.
- Ralph Searle Chadwick – of Hastings. For services to local government and in the fields also of social, civic and sporting activities.
- William James Gaudin – of Paekākāriki. For services to local government in Wellington.
- William Percy Glue – a member of the Christchurch City Council.
- Leila Hunt – of Cambridge. For philanthropic services to patriotic movements.
- Captain David Norman McLeish – of Wellington. For services to the Merchant Navy.
- Robert Matthew Strang JP – of Invercargill. For services to the community.
- Harold Douglas Tait – headmaster of the Hamilton High School and the Boys' High School, Hamilton.
- Te Hana Taua Tamaka – of Hāwera. For services to the Māori people, particularly as chairman of the Taranaki Māori Trust Board.
- Austin George Wilson – of Auckland. For public and social welfare services.
- Philip Randal Woodhouse DSO MC VD MB ChB – of St Andrews; president of the New Zealand Catchment Boards' Association.
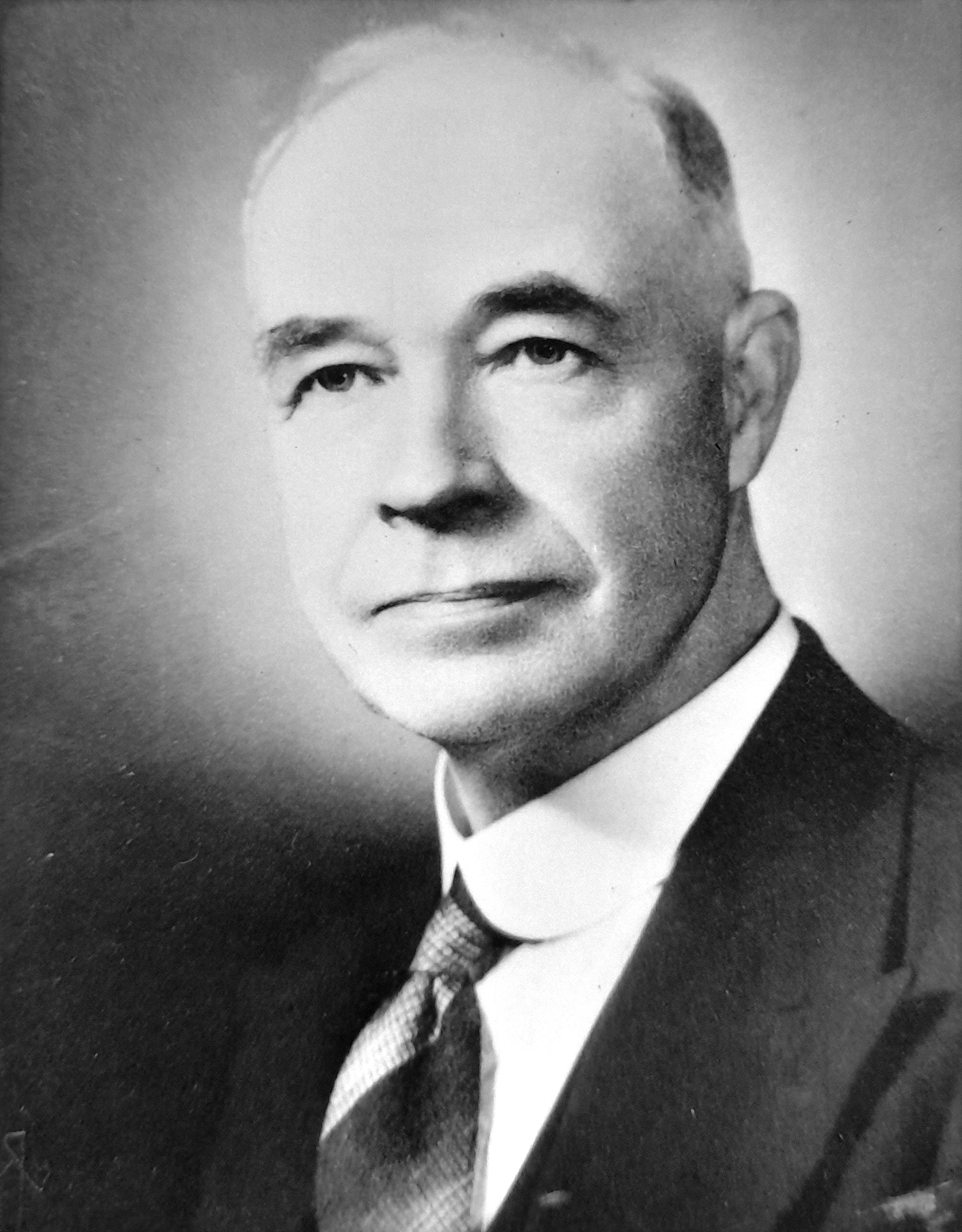
William Gaudin

Military division

- Captain Leonard Stanley Stanners – Royal New Zealand Navy.
- Commander Robert Lindsay Laurenson VRD – Royal New Zealand Naval Volunteer Reserve.
- Lieutenant-Colonel Cecil Clifton Johansen ED – Royal New Zealand Infantry (Territorial Force).
- Squadron Leader Eric Desmond McCabe – Royal New Zealand Air Force Reserve.

=== Member (MBE) ===
Civil division

- Ivy Alma Aldridge. For services to the community, especially in connection with the kindergarten movement in Invercargill.
- Albert Charles Buist JP. For services in connection with the Young Farmers' Club movement, and as chairman of the Feilding High School board of managers.
- William Havilah Down – of Christchurch. For services in the field of sport, especially hockey.
- Janet Cunningham Evans – of Timaru. For services to the Women's Division of the Federated Farmers in South Canterbury.
- William Richardson Fee – of Auckland; president of the Auckland Cricket Association.
- Norman Basil Fippard JP – of Hastings. For services to the community in the fields of accountancy and education.
- Albert Edward Greig – of Picton. For services to the community.
- Samuel Lawn – of Dunedin. For services to the community.
- Ronald McCaw. For services to the community in Hamilton.
- Frank Parsons – of Whenuakura; chairman of the National Dairy Association.
- Adelaide Rose – of Christchurch. For social welfare services.
- William John Schollum JP – of Puhoi. For services to local government.
- Reginald William Sparrow JP – of Upper Tākaka. For services to the Takaka County Council and the Golden Bay County Council.
- Rumatiki Wright – of Raetihi. For services to the Māori people, especially as senior lady Māori welfare officer at Taumarunui.

Military division

- Second Officer Mary Vernon Morten – Women's Royal New Zealand Naval Service.
- Warrant Officer Class I Ian Frederick Forsyth – New Zealand Regiment (Regular Force).
- Warrant Officer Class I Lewis Albert Ims – Royal New Zealand Army Service Corps (Territorial Force).
- Major William Douglas Leuchars – Royal New Zealand Armoured Corps (Territorial Force).
- Major John Francis Spring – Royal New Zealand Artillery (Regular Force).
- Squadron Leader Frederick Lancelot Pearson – Royal New Zealand Air Force Reserve.
- Squadron Leader Jack Brusso Spencer – Royal New Zealand Air Force Reserve.

== British Empire Medal (BEM) ==
Civil division

- Norman Kempt – sergeant, New Zealand Police Force, Pahiatua.

Military division

- Engine Room Artificer 1st Class Basil Bertram French – Royal New Zealand Navy.
- Chief Ordnance Artificer Trevor Graham Lloyd – Royal New Zealand Navy.
- Sick Berth Chief Petty Officer Joseph Steel Mitchell – Royal New Zealand Navy.
- Stores Chief Petty Officer Warwick Garth Benjamin Suckling – Royal New Zealand Naval Volunteer Reserve.
- Master-At-Arms John Vincent Thomson – Royal New Zealand Navy.
- Staff-Sergeant William Lindsay Hall – Royal New Zealand Electrical and Mechanical Engineers (Regular Force).
- Bombardier James Patrick Horn – Royal New Zealand Artillery (Regular Force).
- Flight Sergeant Leonard Meeking – Royal New Zealand Air Force.
- Sergeant Donald James Cameron Malcolm – Royal New Zealand Air Force Reserve.

== Royal Red Cross ==
=== Associate (ARRC) ===
- Matron Edna Judith Lepper – Royal New Zealand Nursing Corps (Territorial Force).

== Air Force Cross (AFC) ==
- Flight Lieutenant James Hirst Bayliss – Royal New Zealand Air Force.

== Queen's Fire Services Medal (QFSM) ==
- James William Grant – brigade secretary, Greymouth Volunteer Fire Brigade.
- Llewellyn Bernard Davies – chief fire officer, Huntly Volunteer Fire Brigade.
