= Joshua Williams (lawyer) =

New Zealand lawyer, politician, judge, university chancellor

The Right Honourable Sir Joshua Williams
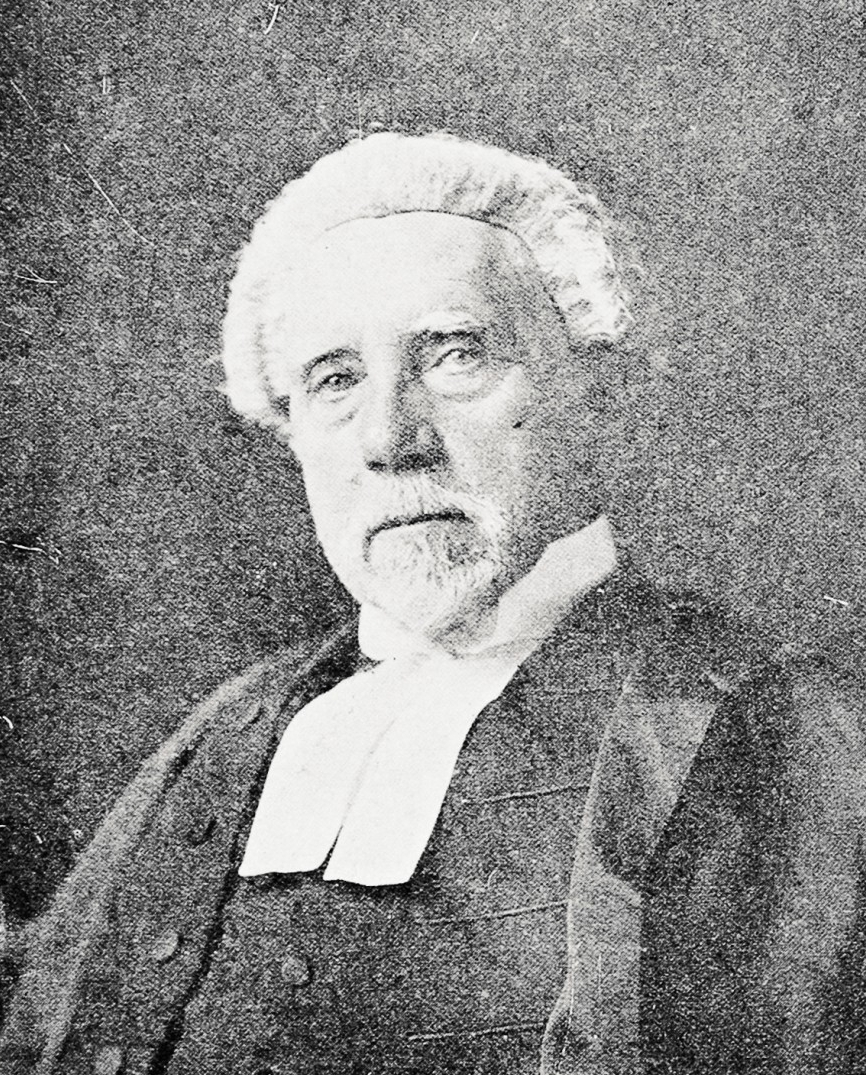
- Justice Williams

1st chairman of the board of Governors of Canterbury College
- In office 9 July 1873 – 1875
- Preceded by: new office
- Succeeded by: Henry Barnes Gresson

Personal details
- Born: 19 September 1837 London, England
- Died: 22 December 1915 (aged 78) Hove, Sussex, England

Sir Joshua Strange Williams (19 September 1837 – 22 December 1915) was a New Zealand lawyer, politician, Supreme Court judge and university chancellor.

== Early life ==
Williams was born in London, England in 1837, the eldest son of the late Joshua Williams, Q.C., author of treatises on the law relating to real and personal property and other works, by his marriage with Lucy, daughter of William Strange, of Upton. Williams was educated at Harrow and Trinity College, Cambridge, where he graduated B.A. (Chancellor's Medallist for legal studies, first class law tripos, third class mathematical tripos) in 1859, M.A. in 1862, and LL.M. in 1870. Williams entered at Lincoln's Inn in January 1857, and was called to the English Bar in November 1859.

== New Zealand ==
He arrived in Dunedin, New Zealand in 1861 on the Derwentwater, moved to Christchurch almost immediately, and in the following year went into partnership with Thomas Smith Duncan, then provincial solicitor, an office which he himself subsequently held for several years.

Williams sat in the Canterbury Provincial Council representing the Heathcote electorate in 1862 and 1863 and from 1866 to 1871. He was on the provincial executive council in 1863, in 1866, and in 1867–1868. On 9 July 1873 at the first meeting of the Board of Governors of the Canterbury College, he was voted chairman after Charles Bowen had declined the role in advance of the meeting. Williams held the chairmanship until 1875, when he moved to Otago.

In January 1871, Williams gave up practice and was land registrar of the Canterbury district until 1872 and Registrar-General of Land for the whole of New Zealand from the latter year until 1875, in which year he was appointed puisne judge for Otago. He was created a knight bachelor in the 1911 Coronation Honours.

He married first, in 1864, Catherine Helen, daughter of Thomas Sanctuary, of Horsham, Sussex; and secondly, in 1877, Amelia Durant, daughter of John Wesley Jago, of Dunedin.

== Arms ==
Coat of arms of Joshua Williams
Motto Deo Adjuvante Non Timendum

== Notes ==
Academic offices
New office	Chairman of the Board of Governors of Canterbury College; 1873–1875	Succeeded by Henry Barnes Gresson
