= Samuel Bealey =

New Zealand politician (1821–1909)

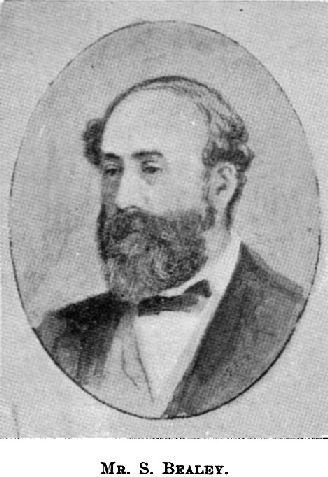
- Samuel Bealey

3rd Superintendent of Canterbury Province
- In office 5 March 1863 – 7 May 1866

Personal details
- Born: 1821 Lancashire, England
- Died: 8 May 1909 (aged 87–88)
- Spouse: Rose Anne

Samuel Bealey (1821 – 8 May 1909) was a 19th-century politician in Canterbury, New Zealand.

Bealey came out to Canterbury in 1851, a pastoralist with capital to invest in farming. He married Rose Ann, daughter of Archdeacon Paul in 1852. Having made money, he returned to England, in 1867 and died there. His son Nowell managed Haldon (sheep) Station.

Bealey stood for election in the Town of Christchurch electorate for the first Provincial Council on 3 September 1853. Five candidates contested the three positions, and Bealey received the second highest number of votes at 74. The two other successful candidates were Thomas Cass and Richard Packer (77 and 71 votes, respectively). Charles Fooks (a brother-in-law of Guise and Joseph Brittan) and Edward Dobson were defeated (at 51 and 21 votes, respectively). Bealey remained a provincial councillor until the dissolution of the first parliament on 14 July 1857. From October 1854 to May 1855, he was a member of the executive council during the superintendency of James FitzGerald. Bealey was again elected onto the Provincial Council on 8 May 1862, this time in the City of Christchurch electorate. He served until 5 March 1863, as on that day, he was elected the third Superintendent, a role which he held to 1866. In 1863 William Sefton Moorhouse was in financial crisis, and put in Bealey as Superintendent instead, as a "safe man", to keep his rival James FitzGerald out. But Bealey, who was usually dependent on stronger personalities, decided to resign, then changed his mind and when the Moorhouse team resigned collected a new team. Most reports on him are rather scathing, a "nobody" or a "bookseller!

Bealey Avenue in Christchurch, Mount Bealey, the Bealey River and the settlement of Bealey in Canterbury are named for him.

== Notes ==
Political offices
Preceded by William Sefton Moorhouse	Superintendent of Canterbury Province; 1863–1866	Succeeded by William Sefton Moorhouse
