= Thomas Cass (surveyor) =

New Zealand surveyor & politician (1817–1895)

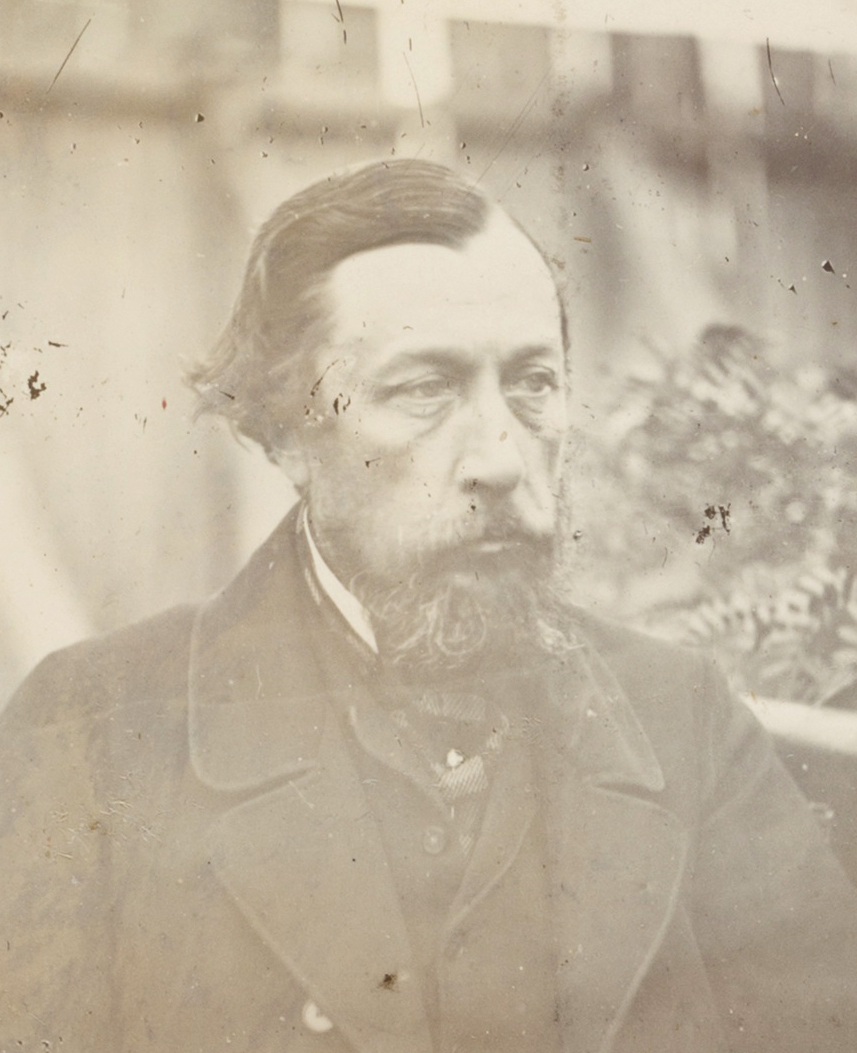
- Portrait of Thomas Cass c. 1865
- Born: 22 November 1817; London, England
- Died: 17 April 1895 (aged 77); Christchurch, New Zealand
- Resting place: Barbadoes Street Cemetery
- Occupation: Surveyor
- Known for: Chief Surveyor of Canterbury (1851–1867); politician
- Spouse: Mary Cass
- Parent(s): Michael Cass, Jane Thickbroom
- Relatives: John Cass, Master Mariner (brother)

Thomas Cass (22 November 1817 – 17 April 1895) was one of New Zealand's pioneer surveyors. Cass contributed much to the public life in the early Canterbury Region.

== Early life ==
Cass was born in London on 22 November 1817, the son of Michael Cass, a linen draper of Gerrard Street, Soho, and his wife Jane. His father was originally from Thirsk, North Yorkshire. Cass's father died in 1825, leaving his widow, who ran a girls' day school, with six children to raise. He received his education at the Royal Mathematical School, in Christ's Hospital school in Hertford and London from 1827 to 1834. In return for his sponsored education, Cass was committed to a seven-year apprenticeship at sea as a trainee mariner, allocated to John Skelton, Commander of the ship Africa. His elder brother John Cass (1813–1889) also trained as a mariner, becoming captain of the Caduceus.

== New Zealand ==
As soon as Cass completed his apprenticeship he left England in 1841 on the Prince Rupert to take up survey work for the New Zealand Company, but the ship was wrecked at the Cape of Good Hope and Cass lost most of his gear. He continued his journey on the Antilla and arrived in Auckland, New Zealand, in December 1841. He helped with the survey of parts of Auckland, and then surveyed Kororāreka, before laying out roads in Northland. He returned to Auckland and surveyed North Shore, and then went back to the Bay of Islands. He was laid off by the New Zealand Company towards the end of 1844 as part of their downsizing.

Cass was then employed at sea and became chief mate on the brig Victoria. He was back in Northland for the Battle of Kororareka on 11 March 1845, and participated in action against Te Rauparaha in the following year. He also transported robbers to Wellington who had ambushed the Greenwood brothers of Purau.

Cass returned to England in 1847 to obtain compensation for his dismissal as a surveyor. He was hired by the Canterbury Association and was made one of the assistant surveyors of Joseph Thomas. Together with Charles Torlesse, they sailed on the Bernicia to Nelson, and from there to Wellington. They reached Lyttelton Harbour on 15 December 1848. Cass undertook a trigonometrical survey in the Christchurch, Lincoln, and Ellesmere districts. When Thomas was sacked in January 1851 by the agent of the Canterbury Association, John Robert Godley, he became chief surveyor and held that role until his retirement in early 1867.

=== Political career and community involvement ===
Cass contributed much to the public life in early Canterbury. He stood for election in the Town of Christchurch electorate for the first Provincial Council on 3 September 1853. Five candidates contested the three positions, and Cass received the highest number of votes at 77. The two other successful candidates were Samuel Bealey and Richard Packer (74 and 71 votes, respectively). Charles Fooks (a brother-in-law of Guise and Joseph Brittan) and Edward Dobson were defeated (at 51 and 21 votes, respectively). Cass resigned on 12 February 1855, and Fooks was elected unopposed to the vacancy.

The Canterbury Provincial Council had an Executive Council (comparable to today's cabinet), and those appointed to it were not necessarily elected members at the time. After William Hamilton resigned from the Executive Council in mid-June 1857, Canterbury's Superintendent James FitzGerald made two appointments on 29 June of that year: Cass and Richard Harman. After FitzGerald resigned in September 1857, William Sefton Moorhouse succeeded him as Superintendent in the following month, and Cass remained on the Executive Council.

The elections for the second Provincial Council were held in November 1857, where six candidates stood for four positions in the Town of Christchurch electorate. Cass came fourth with 96 votes, only one vote ahead of the fifth candidate; the other successful candidates were Richard Packer (165 votes), Charles Wellington Bishop (160 votes), and Charles Fooks (152 votes).

In July 1860, Cass resigned both from the Executive Council and his council membership due to ill health. He was re-appointed to the Executive Council on 10 November 1863 by the third Superintendent, Samuel Bealey, during his leadership crisis, but most of his executive (including Cass) resigned on 4 December 1863. Bealey was succeeded by Moorhouse in May 1866, and Cass was appointed to the Executive Council on 8 June 1866. Cass remained on the executive until 14 December 1866. Immediately after his departure, the Provincial Council discussed an honorarium for Cass, who had signalled his intention to retire as chief surveyor due to his chronic asthma. The Cass Pension Bill 1867 was assented to by the Superintendent in mid-January of that year, which gave Cass an annual honorarium of £250.

Cass went to England in 1867 and became an immigration agent for the Canterbury Province, succeeding Crosbie Ward, who had died in London in November 1867. Cass returned to New Zealand in the following year.

He was secretary for the Canterbury Jockey Club.

== Family and death ==
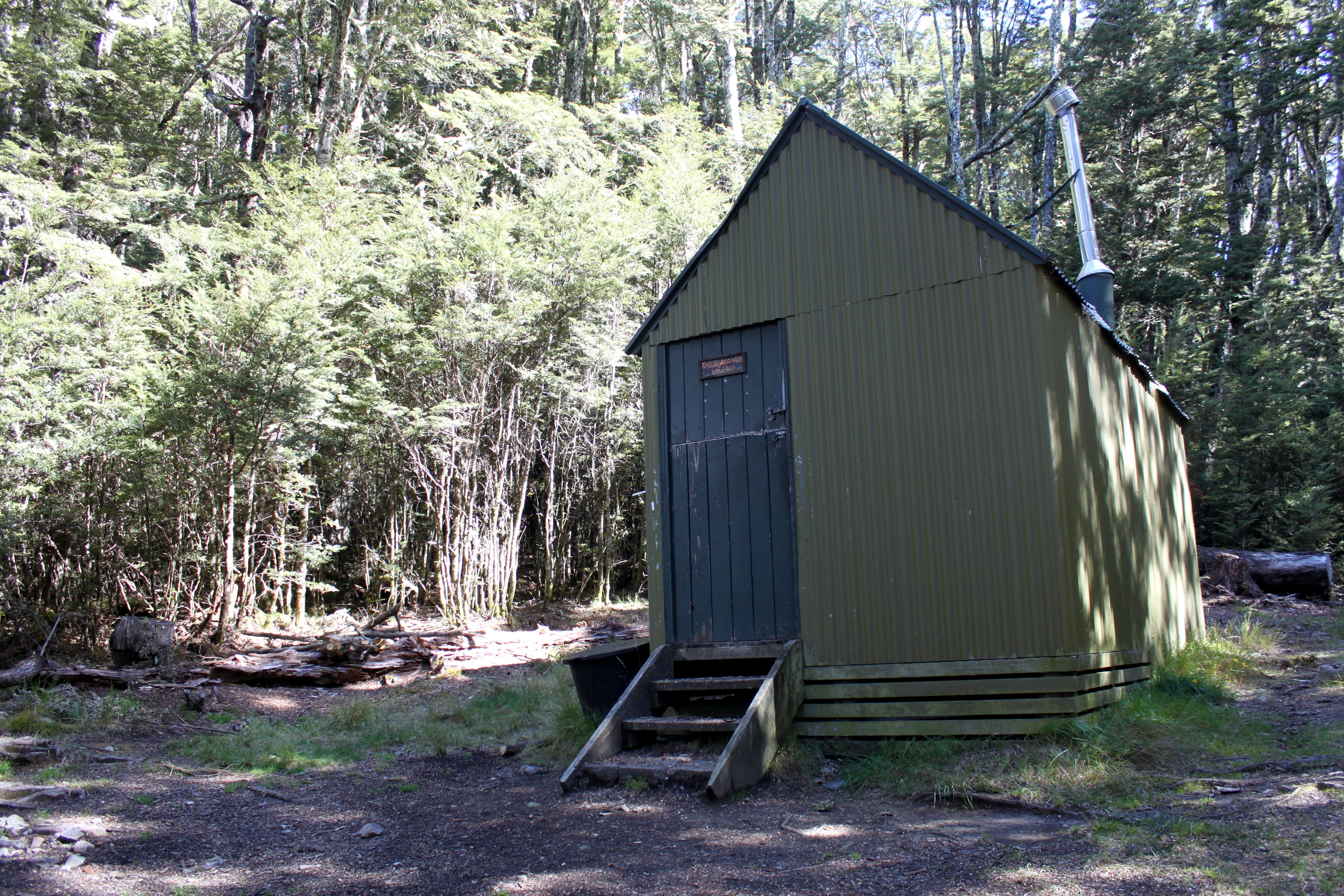
Cass Saddle Hut on the Cass-Lagoon tramping route, which follows the Cass River

On 18 September 1854, Cass married Mary Williams at St Michael and All Angels. She had arrived on the Randolph with her husband, David Theodore Williams. They looked after the Deans' property in Riccarton while John Deans was back in England, but Williams died in March 1852. Mary Cass died on 24 September 1886 aged 70; she had children from her first marriage, but not from her second.

After his wife's death, Cass lived with his step-son, Charles Hood Williams, until his death. Cass was confined to the house, and later to his room, due to his poor health, which was mostly caused by asthma. He was visited by Dr Thomas Hocken in 1894 for an interview, and at the time, Cass was bedridden, deaf, and repeated himself much. Cass died on 17 April 1895, and was buried next to his wife at Barbadoes Street Cemetery.

== Commemoration ==
There are several geographic features in Canterbury named after Cass. The settlement of Cass is located in the Selwyn District in the Southern Alps. The Cass railway station, which for many years was the railhead whilst the Midland Line was under construction and during which the township had a population of 800, was painted in 1936 by Rita Angus; it is "one of New Zealand's best-loved works of art". The nearby Cass River was named by Julius von Haast. Cass Bay in Lyttelton Harbour and Cass Peak in the Port Hills (545 metres; 1,788 ft) above Governors Bay are also named for Cass. Cass Street in the Christchurch suburb of Sydenham was formerly part of Carlyle Street, but was renamed in honour of Cass in about 1950. Cass Street in Temuka also commemorates Cass. In the early days of Sumner, the prominent rock on its beach was called Cass Rock. It was renamed Cave Rock, after the cave that is accessible during low tide, in the mid-1860s. A portrait by Samuel Butler is in the collection of the Canterbury Museum.
