= Kenneth Gresson =

New Zealand lecturer, judge (1891–1974)

Sir Kenneth Macfarlane Gresson KBE (18 July 1891 – 7 October 1974) was a New Zealand soldier, lawyer, university lecturer and judge. He was born on 18 July 1891 and attended Rangi Ruru. His father, John Beatty Gresson, was a solicitor in Christchurch, who died in a railway accident a few months before Kenneth Macfarlane Gresson was born. His grandfather, Henry Barnes Gresson, was one of New Zealand's first Supreme Court judges. He was buried in a family grave at St Paul's Anglican Church, Papanui.

In 1953, Gresson was awarded the Queen Elizabeth II Coronation Medal. In the 1958 New Year Honours, he was appointed a Knight Commander of the Order of the British Empire, in recognition of his services as president of the Court of Appeal.
