= Mount Guinevere =

Mountain in the Canterbury Region of New Zealand

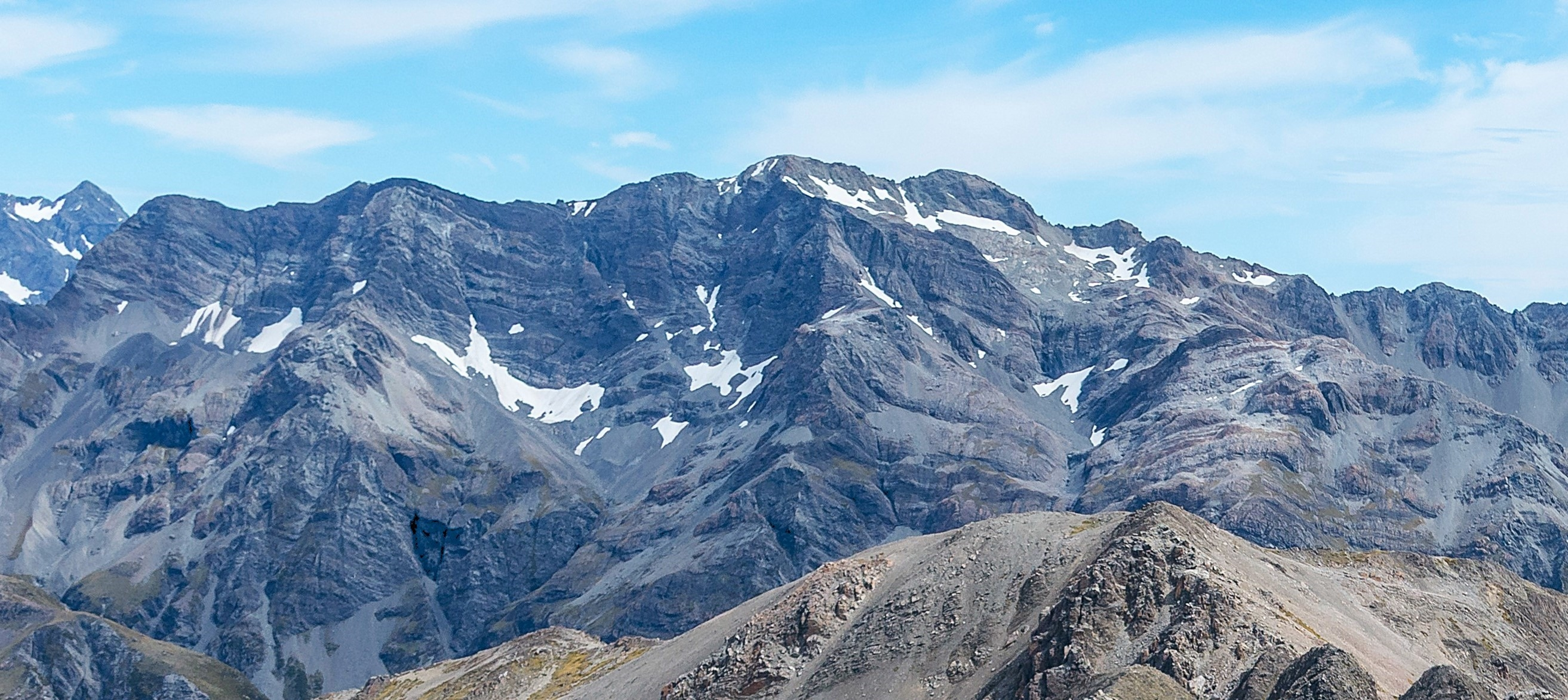
- East aspect

Highest point
- Elevation: 2,042 m (6,699 ft)
- Prominence: 202 m (663 ft)
- Parent peak: Mount Rolleston
- Isolation: 4.51 km (2.80 mi)
- Coordinates: 42.94805°S 171.48868°E

Naming
- Etymology: Guinevere

Geography
- Location within New Zealand
- Interactive map of Mount Guinevere
- Location: South Island
- Country: New Zealand
- Region: Canterbury
- Protected area: Arthur's Pass National Park
- Parent range: Southern Alps; Jellicoe Ridge
- Topo map: Topo50 BS24

Geology
- Rock age: Triassic
- Rock type: Rakaia Terrane

Mount Guinevere is a 2,042-metre-elevation (6,699-foot) mountain in the Canterbury Region of New Zealand.

== Description ==
Mount Guinevere is located 120 kilometres (75 mi) northwest of Christchurch in Arthur's Pass National Park. It is set on Jellicoe Ridge in the Southern Alps of the South Island. Precipitation runoff from the mountain's east slope drains to the Crow River, whereas the west slope drains into the Waimakariri River. Topographic relief is significant as the summit rises 1,220 metres (4,003 feet) above the Waimakariri River Valley in 2.5 kilometres, and 1,140 metres (3,740 feet) above the Crow Valley in two kilometres. The nearest higher peak is Mount Lancelot, 2.9 kilometres to the north. The mountain's toponym refers to Guinevere, as submitted by the Canterbury Mountaineering Club, and officially approved in tandem with nearby Mount Lancelot by the New Zealand Geographic Board. According to Arthurian legend, Guinevere was an early-medieval queen of Great Britain and the wife of King Arthur. Guinevere's tragic love affair with her husband's chief knight and trusted friend, Lancelot, indirectly caused the death of Arthur and the downfall of the kingdom.

== Climate ==
Based on the Köppen climate classification, Mount Guinevere is located in a marine west coast (Cfb) climate zone. Prevailing westerly winds blow moist air from the Tasman Sea onto the mountains, where the air is forced upwards by the mountains (orographic lift), causing moisture to drop in the form of rain or snow. The months of December through February offer the most favourable weather for viewing or climbing this peak.

== Climbing ==
Climbing routes:

- North East Ridge
- Crow Hut Route
- Via side creek which drains from Jellicoe Ridge

== Gallery ==
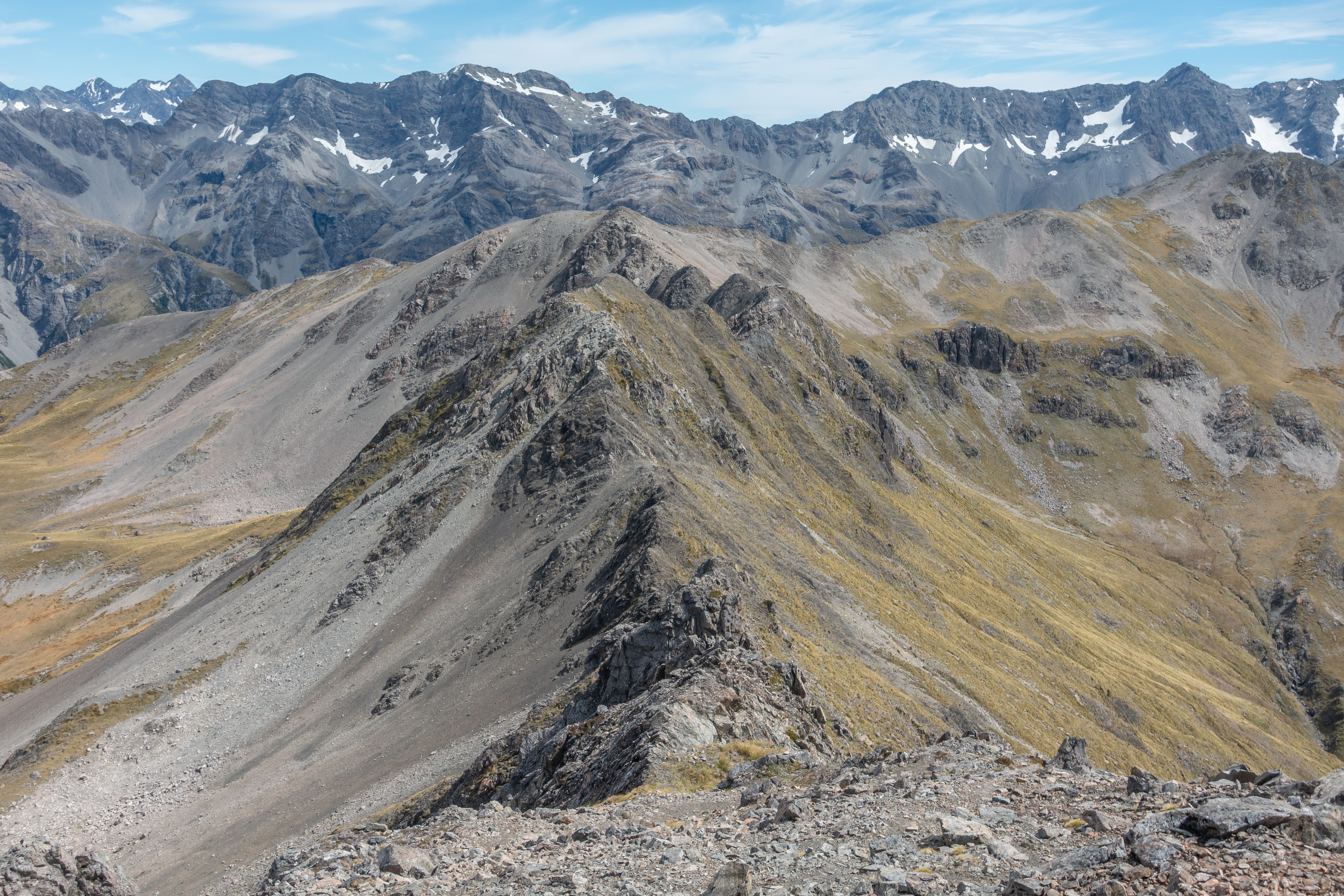
Mount Guinevere left skyline and Mount Lancelot right skyline

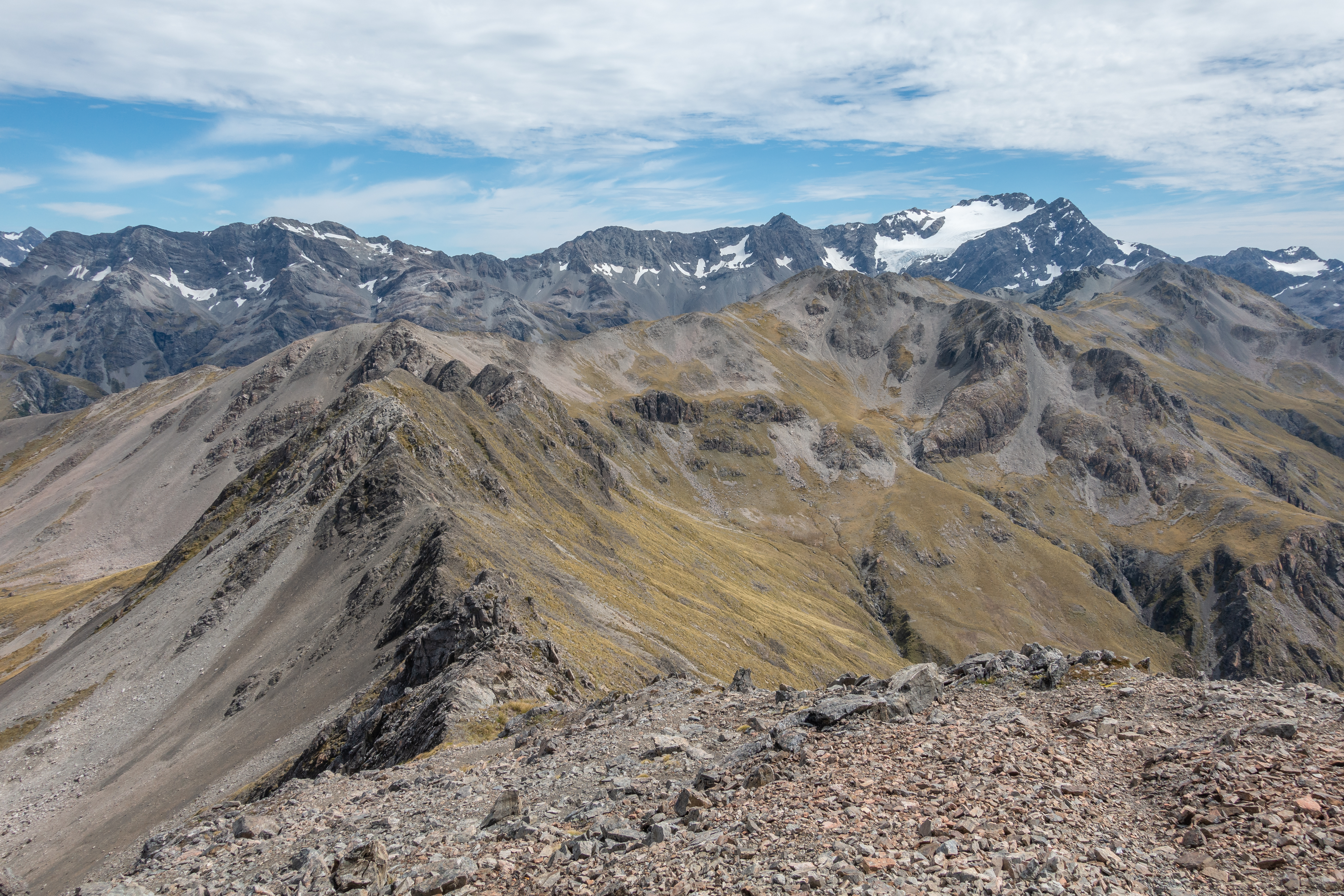
Mount Guinevere, Mount Lancelot, and Mount Rolleston on skyline

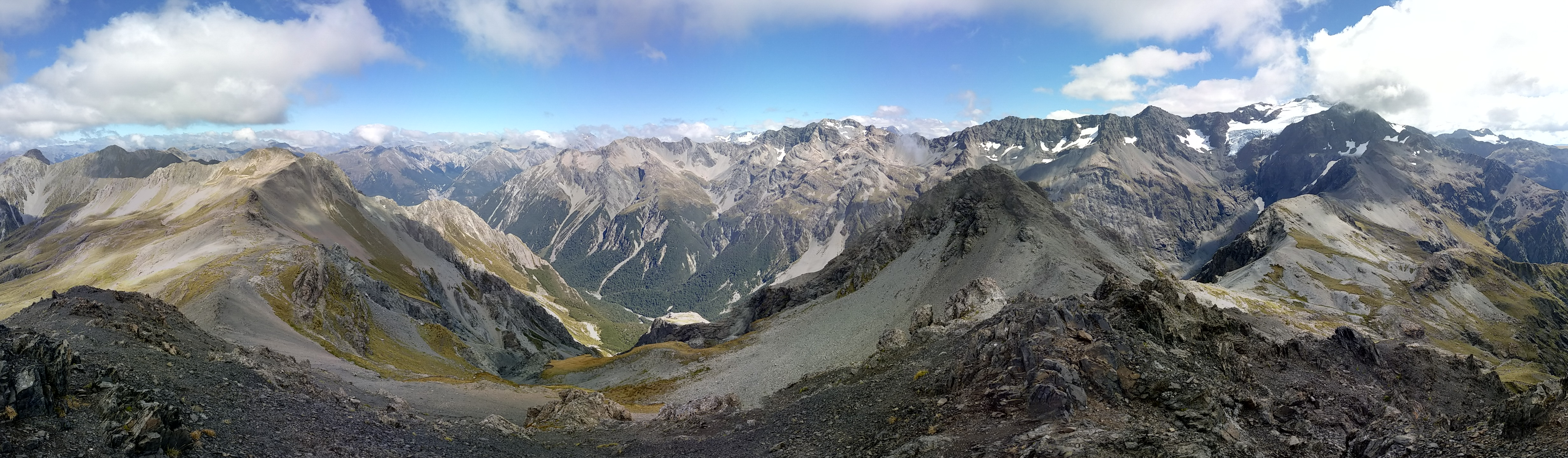
Mount Guinevere centred on skyline

== See also ==
- List of mountains of New Zealand by height
