= Caduceus (ship) =

Merchant ship

The ship Caduceus off Hong Kong, oil painting, Chinese School, 19th century. Royal Museums Greenwich.

Caduceus (1854–1874) was a 1106 ton merchant ship, built in 1854 at Union Dock, Limehouse, London by shipwrights Fletcher Son & Fearnall, which also transported settlers to New Zealand and Australia.

During the Crimean War Caduceus served as a hospital ship. In the Great Storm of 1854, on 14 November, the ship was badly damaged on the Black Sea, losing all three masts. The hull of the Caduceus was relatively intact and was towed by the steamer Melbourne, which had lost two masts, down the Bosporus and up the Golden Horn for repair. Caduceus was captained during the Crimean War by John Cass (1813–1889), master mariner and brother of the pioneer surveyor of New Zealand Thomas Cass.

In 1858 Caduceus undertook a voyage as a convict ship, transporting a single convict from Bombay, India to Fremantle, Western Australia. It arrived in Fremantle on 5 February 1858. The convict, Patrick Devlin, was a 31-year-old soldier who had been convicted of a breach of articles of war by court-martial in Hyderabad State in December 1855, and sentenced to 14 years' transportation. In addition to Devlin, there were three other passengers on board.

Between 1859 and 1872 Caduceus made five voyages bringing settlers from London, England to Auckland, New Zealand. The ship was described as 'a fine and roomy ship'. The fastest of these passage took 92 days and the longest 112 days.

In 1874 the Caduceus was wrecked.

== See also ==
- List of convict ship voyages to Western Australia
- Convict era of Western Australia

== Sources ==
- "Western Australian Convicts – Caducius [sic] 1858".
