= Canterbury Province =

Coordinates: 43.529454°S 172.633895°E

Canterbury
- Provinces of New Zealand
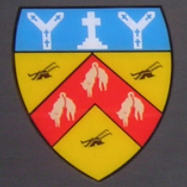
- Coat of arms

- Canterbury Province within New Zealand post 1868
- Country: New Zealand
- Island: South Island
- Established: 1853
- Abolished: 1876
- Named for: Canterbury, England
- Seat: Christchurch

Population (1875)
  - Province: 71,316

The Canterbury Province was a province of New Zealand from 1853 until the abolition of provincial government in 1876. Its capital was Christchurch.

== History ==
Canterbury was founded in December 1850 by the Canterbury Association of influential Englishmen associated with the Church of England. An attempt was initially made to restrict residence in the province to members of the church but this was abandoned. The Charlotte Jane and the Randolph—the first two of the First Four Ships—arrived in the area on 16 December 1850, later celebrated as the province's Anniversary Day.

In 1852, the Parliament of the United Kingdom passed the New Zealand Constitution Act 1852, which amongst other things established provincial councils. The Constitution contained specific provisions for the Canterbury Association; the first being that the new General Assembly (New Zealand Parliament) could not amend the legislation establishing the Canterbury Association, the second being that the Canterbury Association could hand its powers to a newly established provincial government (the Canterbury Province).

Elections were held in 1853 for Superintendent and, later that year, for the 12-member council. These elections predated any elected national assembly. The franchise was extended to men over the age of 21 who owned property in the province. As a result, affairs of the Canterbury Association were wound up in 1855 and outstanding settlement lands handed over to the Canterbury Province. The first meeting place was the former office of the Guardian and Advertiser, Canterbury's second newspaper, on Chester Street near the Avon River. In 1866, the council moved to Guise Brittan's house, which later became part of the Clarendon Hotel. One session in 1858 was held in the town hall on what is now High Street; the town hall was in the section north of Lichfield Street. On 28 September 1859, the council first met in what became known as the Timber Chamber of the Canterbury Provincial Council Buildings. The Stone Chamber of the Provincial Council Buildings was used from November 1865.

Following the West Coast gold rush, the portion of the province west of the Southern Alps was split off as Westland in 1867. Upon the establishment of the University of New Zealand in 1870, its Christchurch campus housed the system's headquarters.

== Geography ==
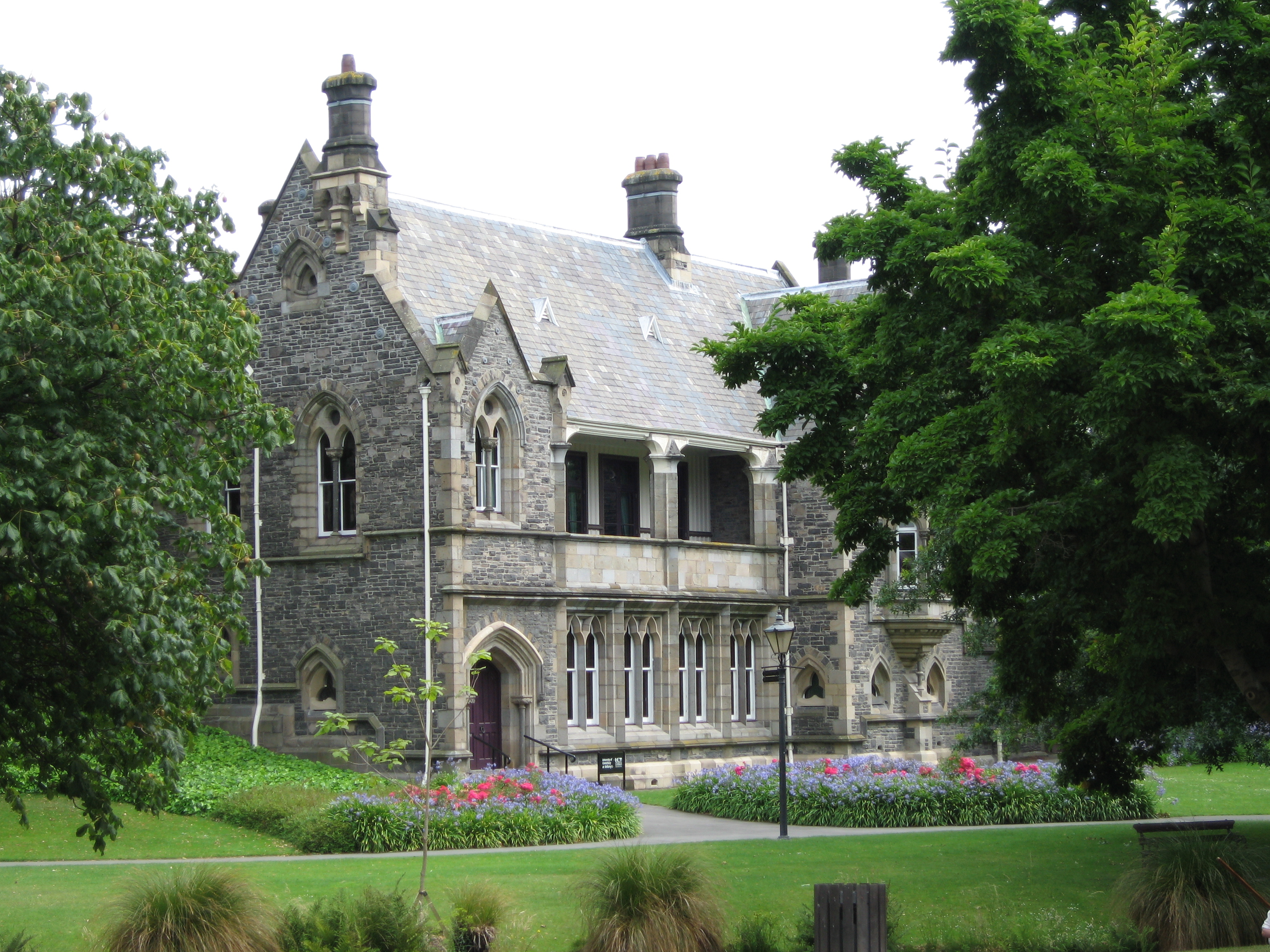
The Canterbury Provincial Council Buildings, designed by Benjamin Mountfort

On the east coast the province was bounded by the Hurunui River in the north and the Waitaki River in the south. The boundary on the west coast was largely undefined before the West Coast became its own province.

In 1868 the West Coast was separated from the Province with the formation of the County of Westland on the West Coast with the boundary line defined as the crest of the Southern Alps. In 1873 the County formed its own Province, the short-lived Westland Province.

In the south the course of the Waitaki River was not known and disputes arose with the Province of Otago over pastoral leases in the inland high country.

In the 1860s South Canterbury made two bids to become separate province but this was rejected by the national government. Instead in 1867 the General Assembly created the Timaru and Gladstone Board of Works which received a proportion of the Canterbury provincial land revenues and was authorised to maintain and build the Timaru harbour and local roads and bridges.

When the province was abolished, the area was distributed across eight counties.

== Railways ==
The Ferrymead Railway was the first railway to be opened (1863) and closed (1868) in New Zealand. It was made obsolete by the opening of a new 8 miles (13 km) line through a tunnel giving Christchurch access to the better port of Lyttelton. The mainlines of the Canterbury Provincial Railways were Irish gauge (5 feet 3 inches or 1.60 meters) with some branch lines in Colonial gauge (3 feet 6 inches or 1.07 meters). These lines were all eventually absorbed into the New Zealand Railways Department in 1876.

== Superintendents ==
Charles Simeon was the returning officer for the first election of a Superintendent. The nomination meeting was held at the Christchurch Land Office (the site now occupied by Our City), and there were three polling stations: in Christchurch at the Resident Magistrate's Court, in Lyttelton at the Resident Magistrate's Court, and in Akaroa.

Canterbury had four Superintendents:

No	from	to	Superintendent
1	20 Jul 1853	Oct 1857	James FitzGerald
2	24 Oct 1857	Feb 1863	William Sefton Moorhouse
3	Mar 1863	May 1866	Samuel Bealey
	30 May 1866	May 1868	William Sefton Moorhouse (2nd time)
4	22 May 1868	1 Jan 1877	William Rolleston

== Executive Council ==
The Executive Council is comparable to a cabinet. The following 26 Executive Councils existed:

No	Head	from	to	other members
1	Henry Tancred	27 September 1853	13 October 1854	William John Warburton Hamilton, Charles Simeon, Harry Godfrey Gouland
2	John Hall	23 October 1854	12 May 1855	Samuel Bealey, Harry Godfrey Gouland, Henry Barnes Gresson
3	Joseph Brittan	12 May 1855	27 July 1855	Henry Barnes Gresson, Richard Packer
4	Henry Tancred	27 July 1855	12 February 1857	Joseph Brittan, Henry Barnes Gresson, William John Warburton Hamilton
5	Richard Packer	12 February 1857	27 July 1857	Henry Barnes Gresson, William John Warburton Hamilton, Thomas Cass, Richard James Strachan Harman
6	Charles Bowen	27 July 1857	3 October 1857	Thomas Cass, Henry Barnes Gresson, Richard James Strachan Harman, Richard Packer
7	Thomas Cass	3 October 1857	8 December 1857	Henry Barnes Gresson, Richard James Strachan Harman, Richard Packer
8	Henry Tancred	8 December 1857	10 February 1858	Thomas Cass, Henry Barnes Gresson, Richard James Strachan Harman, John Ollivier
9	Thomas Cass	10 February 1858	8 November 1859	Thomas Smith Duncan, John Ollivier, Charles Bowen
10	Richard James Strachan Harman	8 November 1859	15 November 1859	Charles Joseph Bridge, George Ross, Augustus White, Charles Wyatt
11	John Ollivier	21 November 1859	21 December 1859	Thomas Cass, Thomas Smith Duncan, George Ross
12	Charles Blakiston	29 December 1859	1 February 1861	Thomas Cass, Thomas Smith Duncan, Robert Wilkin, Henry Arthur Scott
13	Robert Wilkin	1 February 1861	November 1863	Thomas Smith Duncan, Thomas William Maude, Joshua Williams, Hugh Murray-Aynsley, William Sefton Moorhouse, Thomas Cass
14	Thomas Cass	10 November 1863	4 December 1863	Thomas William Maude, William Sefton Moorhouse, Hugh Murray-Aynsley, Joshua Williams
15	Henry Tancred	4 December 1863	8 June 1866	Edward French Buttemer Harston, William Rolleston, George Ross, Edward Cephas John Stevens, William Travers, John Hall, William Patten Cowlishaw, Edward Jollie, Francis Edward Stewart
16	Henry Tancred	8 June 1866	17 October 1866	Thomas Cass, Francis James Garrick, Francis Edward Stewart
17	Francis Edward Stewart	17 October 1866	27 November 1866	Thomas Cass, Francis James Garrick, Robert Wilkin, George Buckley, Thomas William Maude
18	Edward Jollie	29 November 1866	14 December 1866	Thomas Cass, William Montgomery, Joshua Williams, Robert Wilkin
19	Francis Edward Stewart	14 December 1866	3 March 1868	Joseph Beswick, Thomas Smith Duncan, Thomas William Maude, Robert Wilkin, Joshua Williams, George Hart, James Bonar
20	Edward Jollie	3 March 1868	4 June 1869	William Montgomery, Arthur Ormsby, Henry Wynn-Williams, Leslie Lee, Andrew Duncan
21	Arthur Charles Knight	4 June 1869	5 June 1869	John Evans Brown, John Thomas Peacock, Henry Wynn-Williams
22	Edward Jollie	5 June 1869	26 October 1870	Alfred Hornbrook, Robert Heaton Rhodes, Henry Wynn-Williams
23	John Hall	26 October 1870	7 August 1871	John Evans Brown, Alfred Cox, William Browning Tosswill, Walter Kennaway
24	Walter Kennaway	7 August 1871	2 January 1874	George Buckley, William Patten Cowlishaw, Alfred Cox, Arthur Charles Knight, Richard Westenra, Joseph Beswick, Andrew Duncan
25	William Montgomery	2 January 1874	15 April 1875	Edward Jollie, Thomas Joynt, Thomas William Maude
26	John Cracroft Wilson	15 April 1875	28 September 1876	George Buckley, William Miles Maskell, John Thomas Peacock, Henry Wynn-Williams, Arthur Charles Knight, Henry Richard Webb

== Anniversary Day ==
Each New Zealand province celebrates an anniversary day. Canterbury Province's was originally 16 December, the day of the 1850 arrival of the Charlotte Jane and the Randolph. Since 1862, an A&P (Agricultural and Pastoral) show has been held annually. Its Friday Show Day was set for many years on the People's Day and, sometime in the late 1950s, the Christchurch City Council moved the province's Anniversary Day to coincide with the show and encourage greater crowds. The holiday is presently defined as the "second Friday after the first Tuesday in November", ensuring that it will follow the Melbourne Cup Racing Carnival. This adjustment is observed in northern and middle Canterbury; southern Canterbury instead observes its Anniversary Day on Dominion Day (the 4th Monday in September).

== Archives ==
The archives of Canterbury Province are held at Archives New Zealand's Christchurch office, and are some of the most complete provincial New Zealand government archives in existence. In 2023, these archives were inscribed on the UNESCO Memory of the World Aotearoa New Zealand Ngā Mahara o te Ao register.

== Legislation ==
- Canterbury Ordinances 1853 – 1875 The full text of the legislation enacted by the Canterbury Provincial Council between its inception in 1853 and its demise in 1875.
- Church Property Trust Ordinance 1854
- Christ's College Ordinance 1855
- Municipal Councils Reserves Ordinance 1862
- Municipal Corporation Reserves Ordinance 1868
- Reserve No 424 Ordinance 1873
- Educational Reserves Leasing Ordinance (No 2) 1875
- Reserve No 168 Ordinance 1875
- Reserve No 62 Ordinance 1875

== See also ==
- Edward Jollie
- Arthur Dudley Dobson
- 1853 New Zealand provincial elections
