= St Paul's Anglican Church, Papanui =

Church in Christchurch, New Zealand

St Paul's Anglican Church
- St Paul's, Papanui
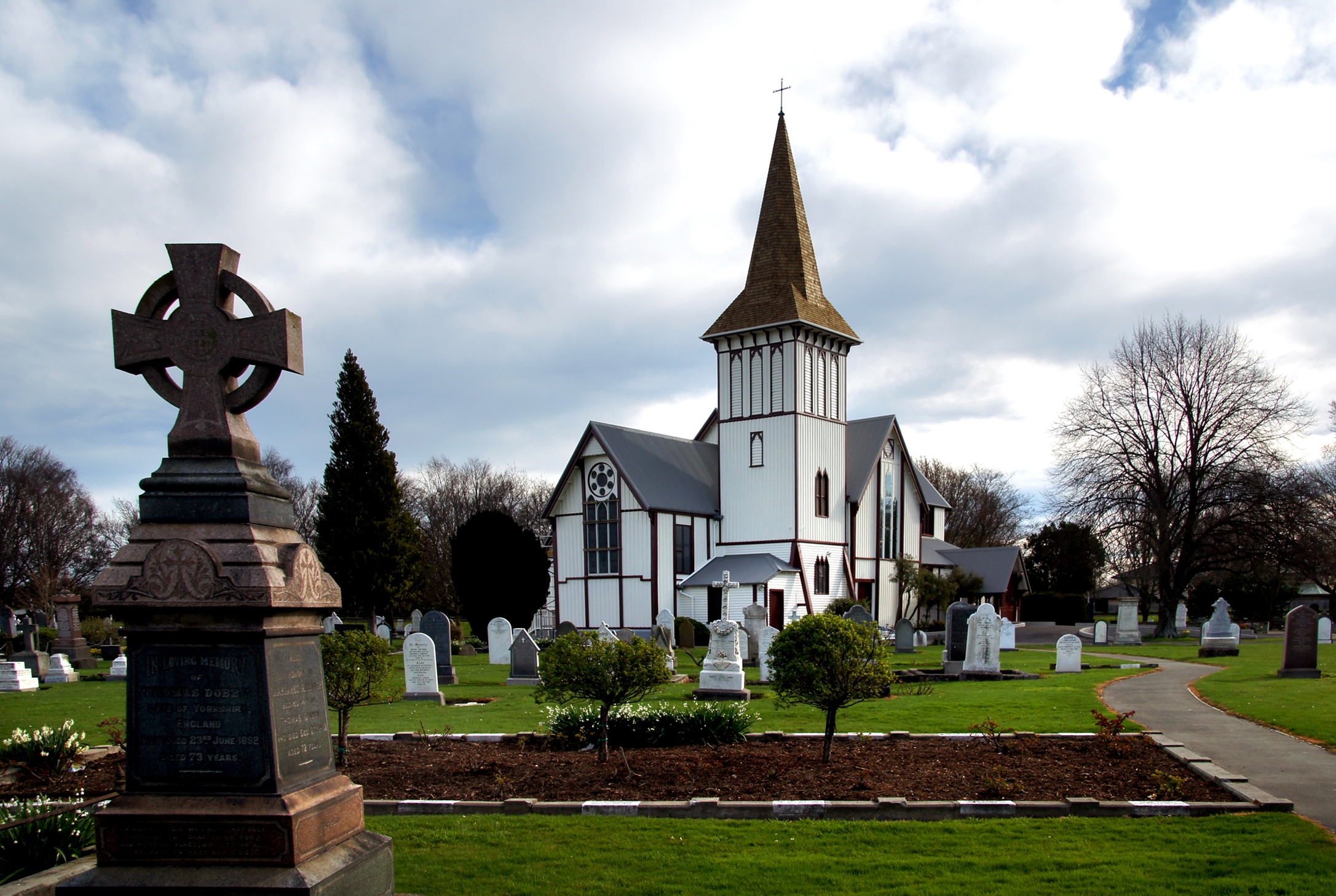
- St Paul's Church in 2013
- St Paul's Anglican Church
- 43°29′49″S 172°36′23″E
- Address: 1 Harewood Road, Papanui, Christchurch, South Island
- Country: New Zealand
- Language(s): English; Spanish
- Denomination: Anglican
- Churchmanship: Evangelicalism
- Website: stpaulspapanui.org.nz

History
- Status: Church
- Founder: The Canterbury Association
- Dedication: Paul the Apostle
- Events: 2011 Christchurch earthquake

Architecture
- Functional status: Active
- Architect: Benjamin Mountfort
- Architectural type: Church
- Style: Gothic Revival
- Completed: 1877

Specifications
- Materials: Timber

Administration
- Province: Anglican Church in Aotearoa, New Zealand and Polynesia
- Diocese: Christchurch
- Parish: St Paul’s Papanui

Clergy
- Vicar: Rev Dr Tim Frank

Heritage New Zealand – Category 2
- Designated: 9 December 2005
- Reference no.: 7635

St Paul's Anglican Church is an heritage-listed Anglican church located in the suburb of Papanui, Christchurch, in the South Island of New Zealand. The church was listed as a Category II heritage building by Heritage New Zealand on 9 December 2005.

== History ==
St Paul's Anglican Church was built in 1877 and replaced an earlier church built on the site in 1852–1853 to serve the settlers who clustered around the stand of bush in the Papanui area, now a suburb of Christchurch. Designed by Benjamin Mountfort in the Gothic Revival style, the building was commissioned by The Canterbury Association.

The timber church was badly damaged in the February 2011 Christchurch earthquake. After an extensive restoration process the church was reopened in October 2013.

Ernest Rutherford married his wife here in 1900.

== St Paul's graveyard ==
The graveyard at St Paul's Church is the last resting place for numerous notable Cantabrians including:

- William Guise Brittan, a government official and philanthropist
- George Dunnage, the first vicar of St Paul's
- Edward Dobson, an engineer
- Tony Foster, a teacher
- Kenneth Macfarlane Gresson, soldier, lawyer, university lecturer, and judge
- Sir (Robert) Heaton Rhodes KCVO, KBE, a barrister, farmer, army officer, politician, and philanthropist
- William Thomson, a politician, auctioneer, accountant, and commission agent
- Captain Charles Upham VC & Bar, a farmer and army officer
