= Emily Foster =

New Zealand teacher (1842–1897)

Emily Sophia Foster (18 December 1842 – 30 December 1897) was a New Zealand teacher and school principal. She was born in Sherborne, Dorset, England, on 18 December 1842; her father was Guise Brittan. She was principal of Christchurch Girls' High School for some years before her sudden death.
