= Tony Foster =

School principal and inspector, university lecturer

Thomas Scholfield Foster (13 September 1853 – 8 September 1918), commonly known as Tony Foster, was a New Zealand school principal, inspector, and a university lecturer.

== Early life and education ==
He was born in London, England, in 1853. His parents moved to New Zealand when he was a child; they arrived in Wellington 31 December 1856, and settled ultimately in Canterbury. Foster studied at the Rangiora Church School before winning a Somes scholarship to study at Christ's College. In 1881 he received a BA Degree from Canterbury College, followed by an MA Degree in languages and literature the following year.

== Career ==
Foster was appointed as the headmaster at Christchurch West High School in 1882, where he had also held the position of master from 1874 to 1881.

In 1904 he was elected as a school inspector for the North Canterbury School District. In 1911 he was appointed the chief school inspector for the North Canterbury Board of Education.

== Personal life ==
On 29 August 1882, he married Emily Sophia Brittan, the daughter of Guise Brittan. His wife was the senior female teacher at Christchurch West High School. His wife died on 30 December 1897 and Foster died on 8 September 1918. Both are buried at St Paul's Anglican Church, Papanui.

== Legacy ==
In 1920 a memorial tablet to his life was unveiled at Canterbury College Hall, where he had studied and later become a lecturer and the president of its training college. The tablet bore the inscription "His life was devoted with untiring zeal and perfect singleness of aim to the cause of education."
