= Charles Upham (doctor) =

New Zealand doctor (1863–1950)

Charles Upham MRCS LRCP
- Born: 20 July 1863; Hampstead, London, England
- Died: 31 July 1950 (aged 87); Lyttelton, New Zealand
- Other names: The Little Doctor
- Occupation: physician
- Relatives: Charles Upham (nephew)

Charles Hazlitt Upham MRCS LRCP (20 July 1863 – 31 July 1950) was a doctor and popular figure in Lyttelton, New Zealand.

== Biography ==
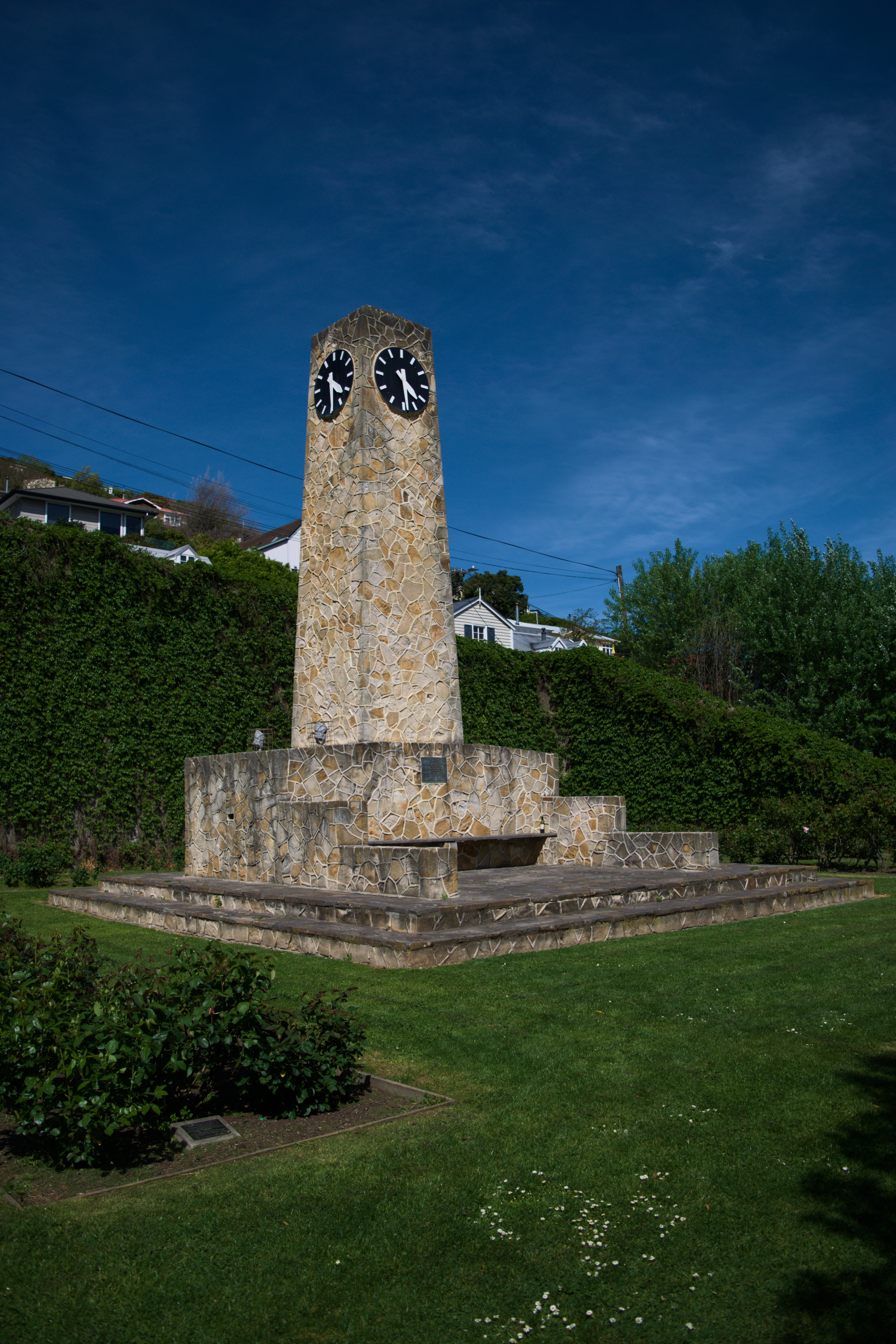
The Upham Memorial Clock Tower

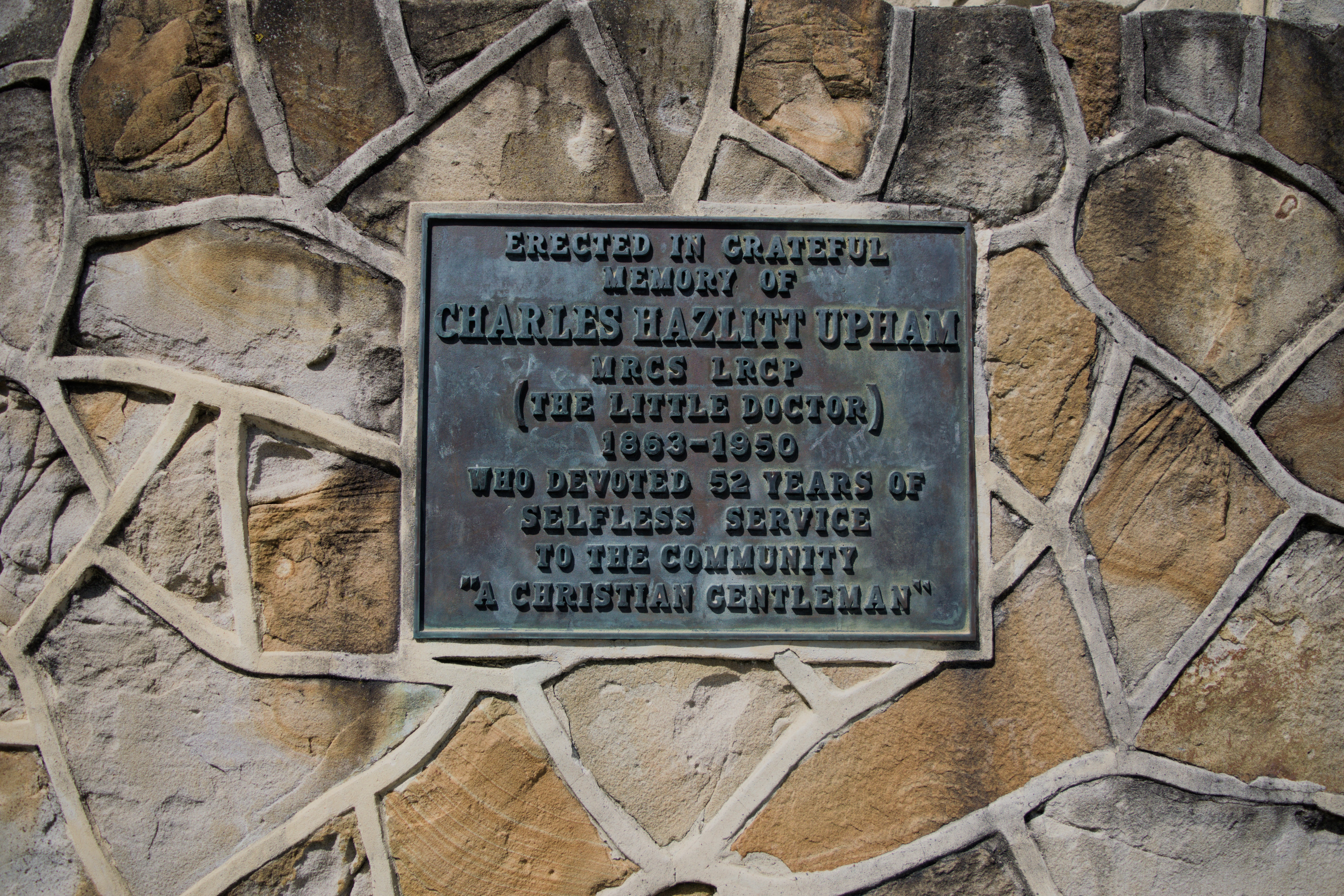
Plaque on the Upham Memorial Clock Tower

Charles Hazlitt Upham was born in Hampstead, London, England on 20 July 1863. He was a descendant of prominent British painter John Hazlitt, and Upham himself was a talented sketch artist. Upham trained at St. Bartholomew's Hospital in London, and joined the Royal Navy as a medical officer, becoming at that time the youngest staff-surgeon in the Navy.

Upham arrived in Lyttelton in 1898 as ship's doctor aboard HMS Torch, and chose to buy a local medical practice and settle down. He was well-liked in the town, and known for his generosity and care of his patients. Upham was active in the Anglican church, serving as vicar's warden at Holy Trinity church in Lyttelton, where he taught bible lessons. He was a shorter man, and came to be known by the affectionate nickname "The Little Doctor".

Upham cared for the lepers on the colony at Ōtamahua / Quail Island for most of the nineteen years it operated.

Upham died at his home in Lyttelton on 31 July 1950. After his death, a large memorial clock tower was erected on the site of the former Lyttelton Gaol in his honour in 1953. He shared his name with his nephew, Charles Upham, who became New Zealand's most decorated soldier during World War II, being awarded the Victoria Cross twice.
