= Lyttelton Gaol =

Historic prison in Lyttelton, New Zealand

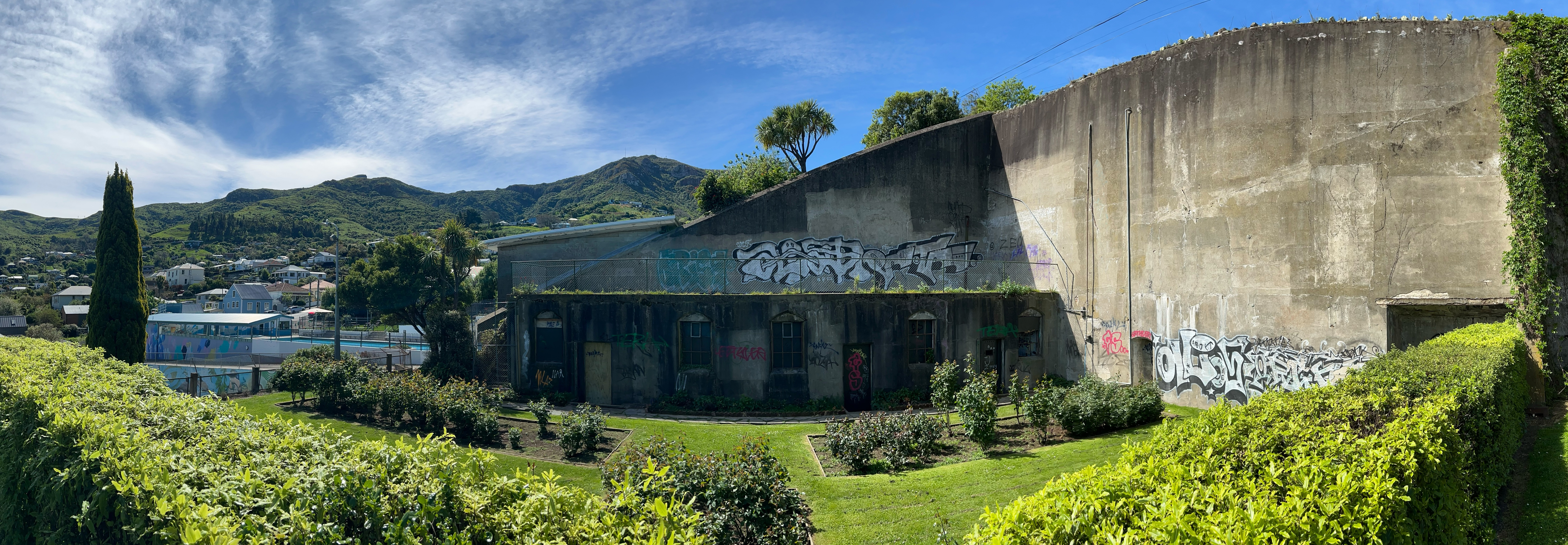
- Remaining structures of the gaol in 2025
- Interactive map of Lyttelton Gaol
- Location: Lyttleton, New Zealand; 43°36′8″S 172°43′26″E
- Opened: c. 1860
- Closed: c. 1920

Heritage New Zealand – Category 1
- Designated: 13 December 1996
- Reference no.: 7353

The Lyttelton Gaol was a historic prison building and complex in Lyttelton, New Zealand.

== History ==
=== Operating years ===
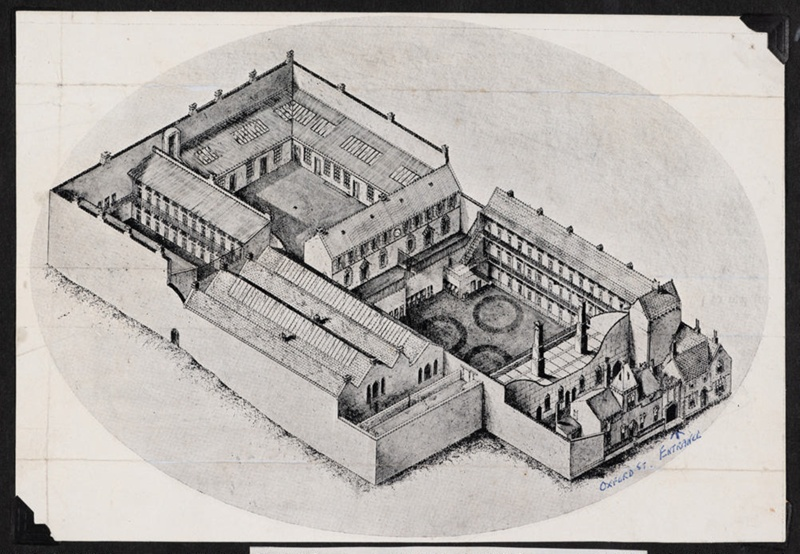
Architectural cutaway of the Lyttelton Gaol drawn in 1923 for a government report

The first buildings on the Lyttelton Gaol site began construction in 1851, with work carried out by William Chaney and the design by Benjamin Mountfort. The exact opening date of the gaol is not known. The gaol's rules and regulations were first published in 1857, and the buildings were largely completed by 1861. It was the first gaol in Canterbury.

The building was cornered and faced with stone from Ōtamahua / Quail Island. The main gaol building was surrounded by a high stone wall, the top of which was embedded with broken glass and metal spikes.

Convicts from the prison were used as hard-labour gangs doing public works construction, particularly reclamation and construction of wharves for the Port of Lyttelton, as well as roads and retaining walls, many of which still exist today. During the 1870s convicts were also put to work constructing Fort Jervois on Ripapa Island. For a time it was the main prison in the South Island.

The gaol was subject to continued criticism from officials like Edward Seager throughout the 1860s, mostly due to its small size and the resulting cramped conditions. In part, this was due to the gaol also housing debtors and the mentally insane. A newer and larger gaol was planned to be built in Addington, New Zealand, which opened in the 1870s.

William Donald was the medical officer at the gaol during the 1860s.

Seven men were hanged at Lyttelton Gaol for murder between 1868 and 1918. Hangings were initially held outside the gaol, but moved within the walls in 1862. A bell would toll to announce that a hanging was to occur, and the local children would climb the hills to have a view inside the prison grounds.

Despite the formidable walls, a number of prisoners managed to escape from the gaol, mostly by absconding from the work gangs. The most famous of these escapees was James Mckenzie, who escaped custody twice. The man convicted of fraud in the infamous "severed hand" case of 1885, Arthur Howard, was one of the few escapees to manage to scale the walls.

=== Closure and demolition ===
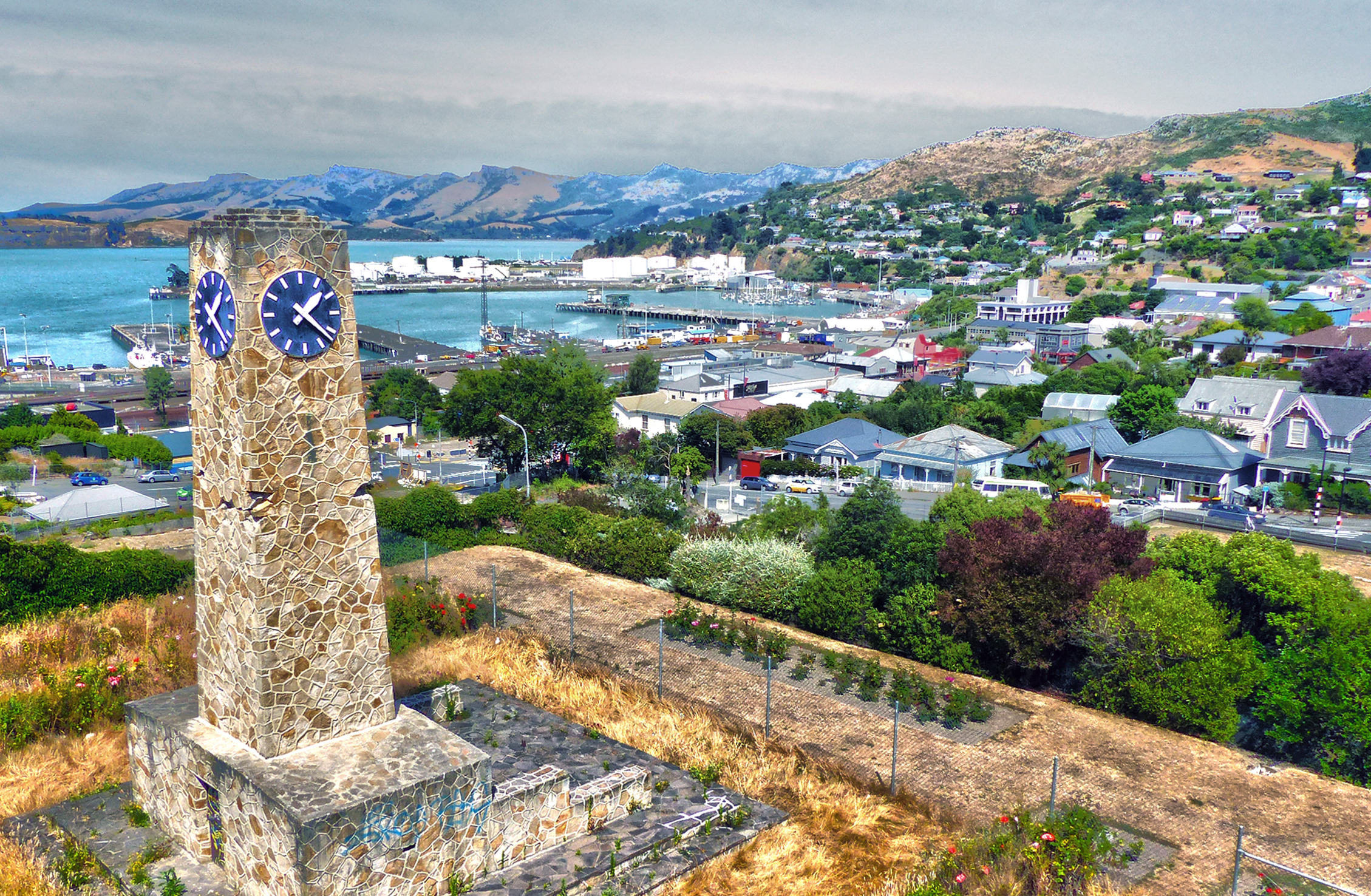
The Upham Memorial Clock Tower stands on the former site of the prison.

During the early 20th century, newer prisons at Addington and particularly the new Christchurch Prison at Paparua—gazetted 5 January 1915—were housing the majority of inmates. By 1921, Lyttelton gaol was empty.

Demolition was a difficult challenge, as the prison walls were 2 feet (0.61 m) thick and made of solid concrete and stone masonry. By the end of 1922, prisoners from Paparua were employed in deconstructing the prison. Explosives had to be used to blast much of the structure apart. The broken concrete was used for road metal as well as for reclamation projects at the port.

After the demolition, the site was leased to the neighbouring Lyttelton Borough School for their playground. The Upham Memorial Clock was installed on the site in 1953, to honour popular local doctor Charles Upham. The high concrete walls of the gaol at the rear and on one side remain, and are archaeologically significant as one of the earliest uses of concrete in New Zealand.

== See also ==
- List of oldest buildings in Christchurch
