= Guise Brittan =

New Zealand Commissioner of Crown Lands (1809–1876)

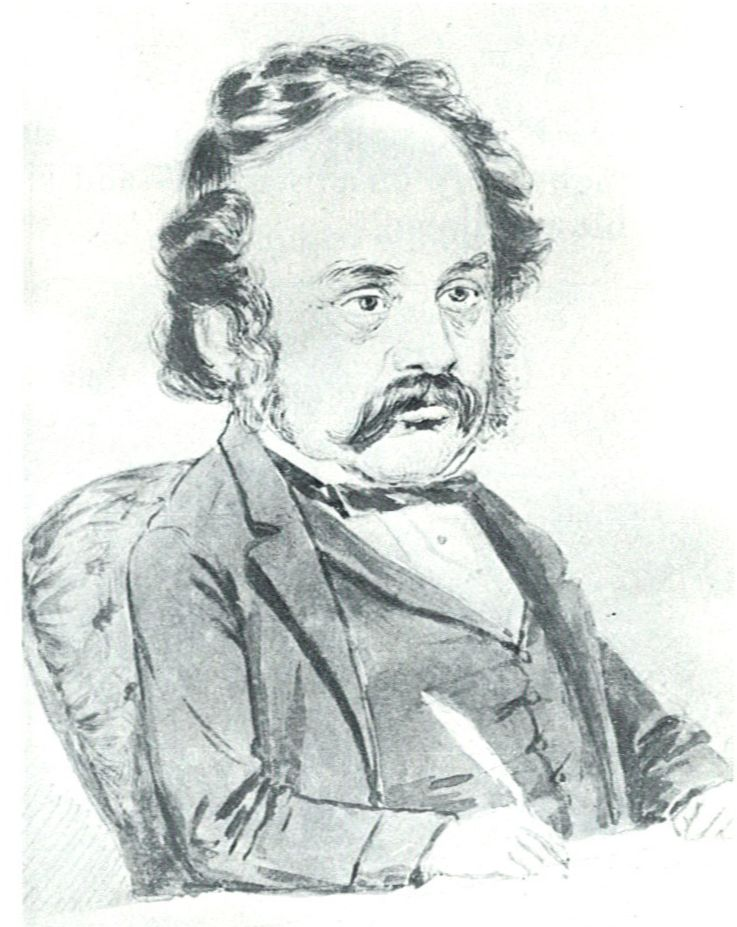
- Caricature of Guise Brittan

Commissioner of Crown Lands for Canterbury
- Preceded by: First

Personal details
- Born: 3 December 1809 Gloucester, Gloucestershire, England
- Died: 18 July 1876 (aged 66) Christchurch, New Zealand
- Resting place: St Paul's Anglican Church
- Spouse: Louisa Brittan (née Chandler)
- Relations: Joseph Brittan (brother); Mary Rolleston (niece); Tony Foster (son-in-law); Emily Foster (daughter)
- Occupation: Surgeon, newspaper editor, farmer, administrator
- Profession: Surgeon

William Guise Brittan (3 December 1809 – 18 July 1876), mostly known as Guise Brittan and commonly referred to as W. G. Brittan, was the first Commissioner of Crown Lands for Canterbury in New Zealand.

== Biography ==
Brittan was born in Gloucester, Gloucestershire, England, in 1809 into a respectable middle-class family that originated from Bristol. He received his education at Plymouth Grammar School, after which he studied medicine. He undertook several journeys on the General Palmer to China or India.

Later, he lived in Staines and then in Sherborne, Dorset, where, together with his older brother Joseph, he was proprietor of the Sherborne Mercury, a newspaper covering the area beyond the boundaries of Dorset. He married Louisa Brittan (née Chandler) and his brother married her sister Elizabeth Mary Brittan (née Chandler).

He joined the Canterbury Association, despite being of much lower class than most of its members. When a Society of Canterbury Colonists formed in 1850, with the objective of representing land purchasers (referred to as colonists, as opposed to 'emigrants' for labourers and artisans), Brittan was called to the chair for the first meeting on 25 April 1850. A management committee was formed, where Brittan was joined by James FitzGerald and Henry Sewell. Brittan impressed Edward Gibbon Wakefield, one of the instigators of the Canterbury Association. Wakefield wrote to John Robert Godley, the other driving force behind the colonisation scheme who was already in New Zealand, and suggested that Brittan be given a role of responsibility.

Brittan came to Christchurch on Sir George Seymour in December 1850 and was thus one of the Pilgrims (the term adopted for all those early arrivals). His wife and four children travelled with him. He chose land at Papanui Bush and alongside the Avon River just outside the initial town area (these days the area to the east of Fitzgerald Avenue), where he built his first substantial home, Englefield Lodge. His older brother Joseph followed him to Christchurch in 1852 and established his farm some 800 metres (2,600 ft) downstream, which he called Linwood.

== Political ambitions ==
Brittan declared his candidacy in the Christchurch Country electorate for election to the 1st New Zealand Parliament by advertisement in the Lyttelton Times on 18 June 1853. In late July, Henry Sewell decided that he would also stand for Parliament; the question was whether he should run in the Town of Christchurch or the Christchurch Country electorate. There was one position to be filled in the town electorate, and two in the rural electorate. Sewell sought counsel from some friends, who recommended for him to stand in the rural electorate, but he did not want to oppose Brittan. Sewell thought that whilst Brittan was unpopular with the constituency, it would nevertheless be useful to have him in Parliament. The complication with the town electorate was that John Watts-Russell had already received a pledge from the majority of that constituency, but there were rumours that he would not stand, and it was known that he was just about to go travelling during the time of the election campaign. Sewell talked to Brittan, who fully supported him standing in the town electorate, and Brittan pledged that he would get his brother-in-law, Charles Fooks, to canvas for him. Sewell first advertised his candidacy in the Lyttelton Times on 30 July. In the same edition of the newspaper, James Stuart-Wortley advertised his candidacy for the Christchurch Country electorate. Jerningham Wakefield reiterated his candidacy for the Christchurch Country electorate in early August upon his return from Wellington. At the same time, Fooks announced his candidacy for the Town of Christchurch electorate. With James FitzGerald, who had just been elected the first Superintendent of the Canterbury Province, apparently in support of Watts-Russell, Sewell decided to withdraw from the contest, but decided to go ahead with a public meeting to 'speak his mind'. On 4 August, he held a meeting at the Golden Fleece, a hotel on the corner of Colombo and Armagh Streets, and addressed between 30 and 40 electors. He discussed all the issues that Parliament should deal with, but finished by saying that he would not be available as a candidate, as Watts-Russell had been pledged the support of the constituency. After an awkward period of silence, Richard Packer stood up and replied:

We are in an awkward position. Here was a Gentleman who told [us] all sorts of things which a Representative ought to attend to and then declined standing himself, because of another Candidate whose intentions no one knew anything about—and who was just on the point of starting for an excursion without giving any one an opportunity of learning his sentiments about anything.

The meeting expressed dissatisfaction with Watts-Russell and that they would not hold themselves bound to support him. FitzGerald spoke in support of Watts-Russell, but was not well received. Fooks then spoke, but mainly to attack Sewell. The following day, Sewell met with FitzGerald and discussed that either himself or Watts-Russell should retire from the contest, but that if he himself was to retire, then Watts-Russell or at least some of his friends should inform the constituency about his intentions. FitzGerald's impression was that it should be Watts-Russell who should retire. Later that day, Watts-Russell wrote an announcement that he would retire from the contest, which was published in the Lyttelton Times on 13 August.

On 9 August, the Colonists' Society held a meeting at the White Hart Hotel. Christchurch's first hotel was on the High Street (then called Sumner Road) and Cashel Street corner, with Michael Hart as proprietor. The 50 to 60 attendees were addressed by Sewell, Stuart-Wortley, and Wakefield. As a result, committees were formed that were to achieve the return of these three candidates. At this point, Sewell thought that Brittan would not have a chance of getting elected, as he was most unpopular, and he refused to go canvassing. Over the next few days, Octavius Mathias, the vicar of St Michael and All Angels, was Sewell's main antagonist.

The nominations for the town and country electorates were held together on Tuesday, 16 August. The hustings were erected in front of the Land Office (these days the site of Our City). The three candidates for the Christchurch Country electorate spoke first, with Stuart-Wortley and Wakefield winning the show of hand, and Brittan visibly offended, but demanding a poll. Sewell was proposed by John Hall, and seconded by postmaster and storekeeper Charles Wellington Bishop. Fooks was proposed by Joshua Charles Porter (a lawyer; later Mayor of Kaiapoi), and seconded by the publican Michael Hart. Whilst Sewell's speech was well received, Fooks was laughed at and interrupted (Sewell said that Fooks did him "more service than [he] could have done [him]self"). The show of hands was in favour of Sewell; no more than five hands were raised in support of Fooks.

The election in the town electorate was held on Saturday, 20 August, between 9 am and 4 pm. The method of voting at the time was that an elector would tell the returning officer his choice of candidate. As this happened in public, a tally of the votes could be kept, and Fooks was initially ahead, but within an hour, Sewell passed him. The result was 61 votes to 34 for Sewell, who was thus declared elected.

The election in the country electorate was held one week later, on 27 August, in the same place and with another polling station in Lyttelton. In both locations, Brittan came a distant last. There were rumours at the time that Stuart-Wortley was under age; to be eligible to vote or to be elected, one had to 21 years of age. According to Burke's Peerage, he was not of full age, but the family lawyer confirmed that he was.

== Family ==
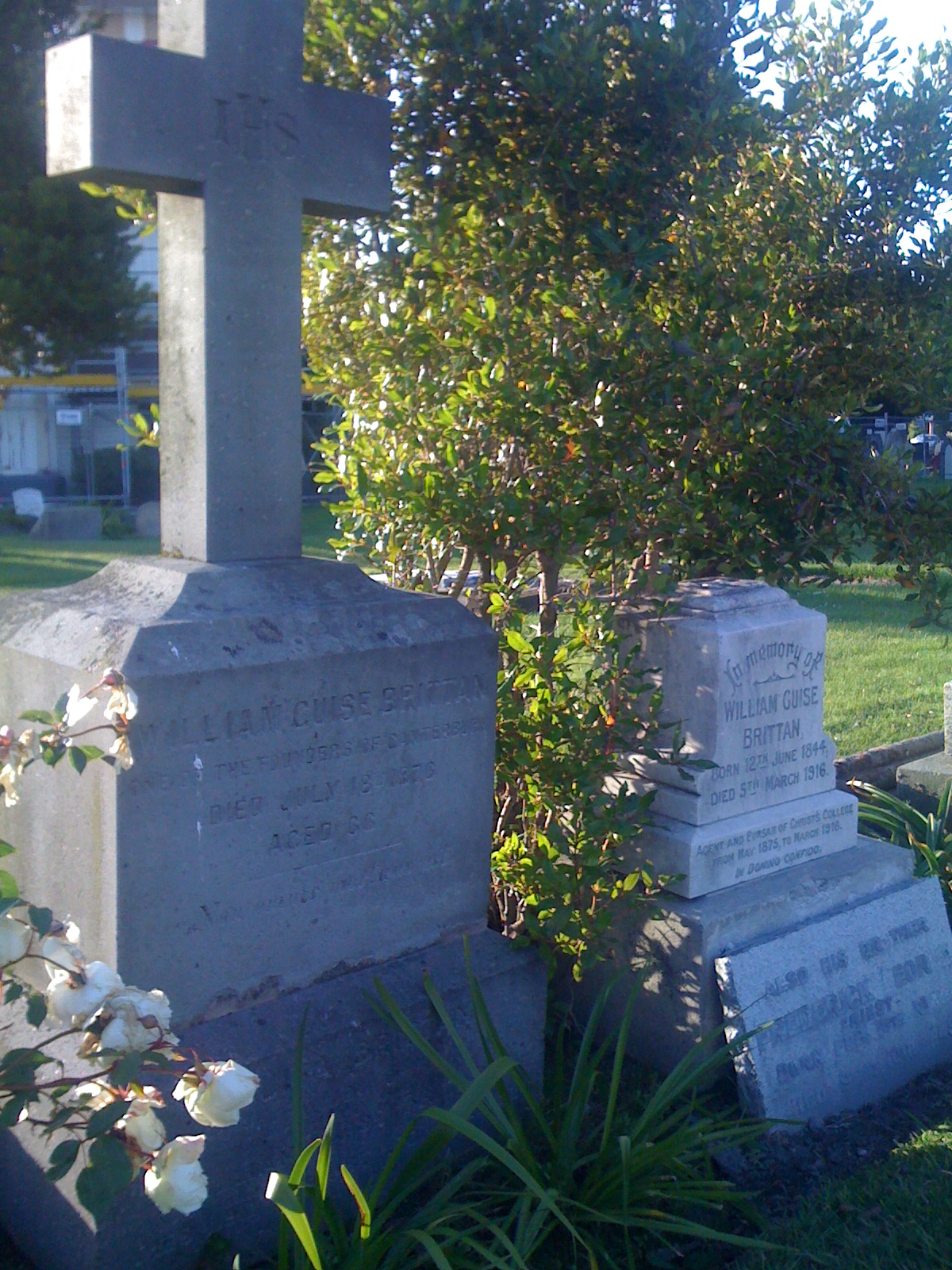
Gravestone of Guise Brittan (left) and William Guise Brittan Jr at St Paul's Anglican Church in Papanui

Guise Brittan died on 18 July 1876 at his home in Cashel Street West, Christchurch, and is buried at St Paul's Anglican Church in Papanui. It was his wish to be buried there, as his son Frederick was minister at the church at the time of his death. The Brittan brothers were Anglican, though the Brittan family had been Methodist. Guise had been a lay reader at Holy Trinity Avonside, which he had helped start and supported.

Brittan's wife Louisa died in 1901, aged 92. The four children that emigrated with them were Emily Sophia (18 December 1842 – 30 December 1897), William Guise (12 June 1844 – 5 March 1916), Harriette Louisa (four when she arrived), and Frederick George (19 February 1848 – 10 September 1945). Frederick Brittan was the last survivor from the First Four Ships, and his funeral service was held at ChristChurch Cathedral.

Harriett (1846–1934) married Rev. Charles Carlyon Coates in 1881. Their grandson was Charles Hazlitt Upham, VC and bar.)

Emily Foster, although married (to Tony Foster) with children, continued teaching (which was unusual at the time) and became headmistress, first at Christchurch West and then at Christchurch Girls' High School.
