= Charles Upham =

New Zealand soldier (1908–1994)

Charles Hazlitt Upham VC & Bar
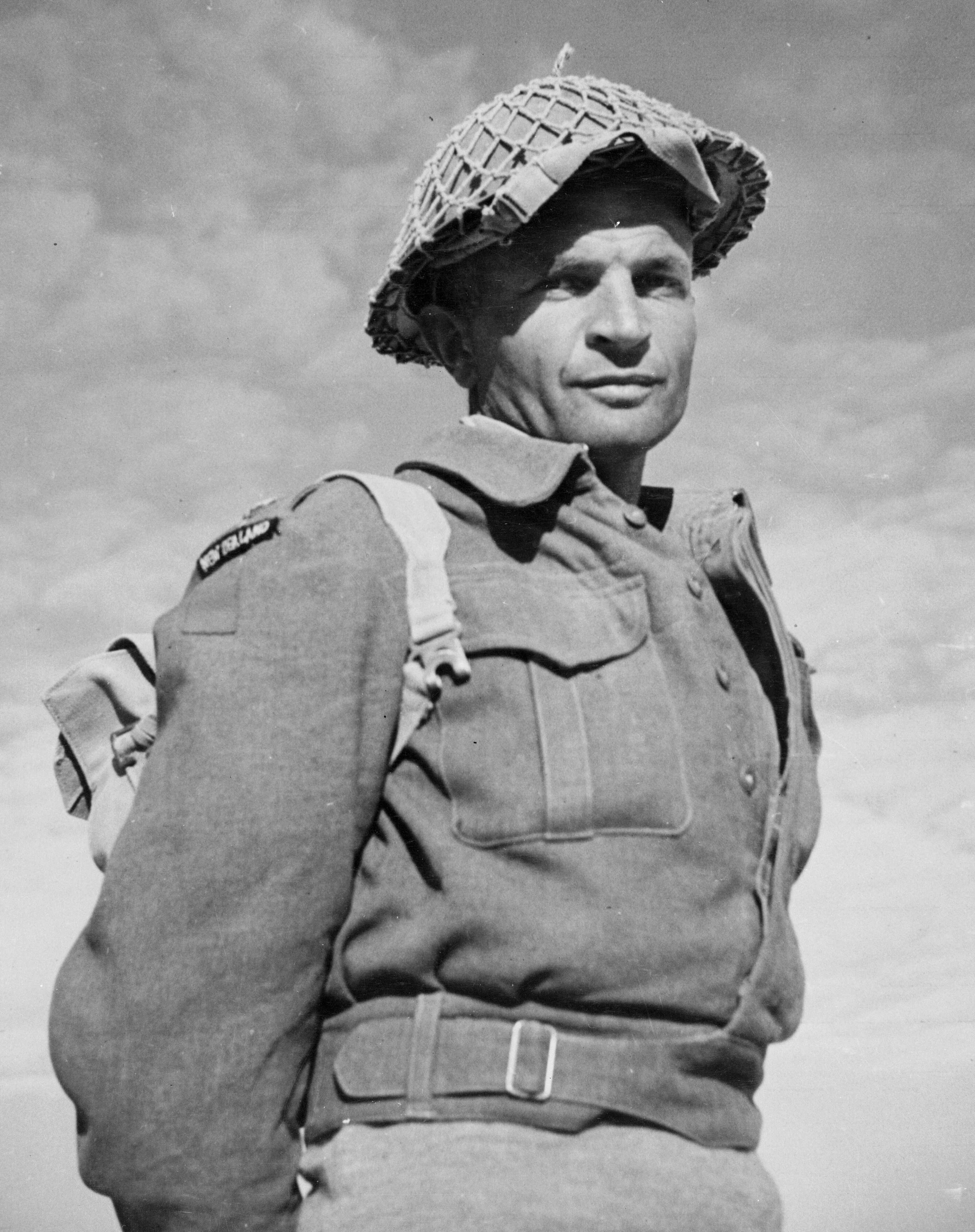
- Charles Upham in NZ field uniform c.1941
- Born: 21 September 1908; Christchurch, New Zealand
- Died: 22 November 1994 (aged 86); Christchurch, New Zealand
- Spouse: Molly McTamney (m. 1945)
- Children: 3
- Relatives: Charles Upham (uncle)
- Military career
- Allegiance: New Zealand
- Branch: New Zealand Military Forces
- Service years: 1939–1945
- Rank: Captain
- Nicknames: Pug, Puggie
- Service number: 8077
- Units: 20th Battalion, New Zealand 2nd Division
- Conflicts: Second World War; Battle of Greece; Battle of Crete; North African campaign; First Battle of El Alamein
- Awards: Victoria Cross & Bar; Mentioned in despatches; Order of Honour (Greece)
- Other work: Sheep farmer

Charles Hazlitt Upham VC & Bar (21 September 1908 – 22 November 1994) was a New Zealand soldier during the Second World War. He is one of three people to be awarded a Victoria Cross (VC) twice and the only fighting combatant to be so honoured, the others being doctors Arthur Martin-Leake and Noel Godfrey Chavasse.

Born in Christchurch, New Zealand, he attended Christ's College and later the Canterbury Agricultural College, where he earned a diploma in agriculture. Before the outbreak of the war, Upham worked as a sheep farmer and a manager of a high country station and later at the Government Valuation Department. In 1939, with the advent of war, he enlisted in the Second New Zealand Expeditionary Force, where he quickly rose through the ranks, from private to officer.

Upham's first Victoria Cross was awarded for his actions in the Battle of Crete in May 1941, where he displayed remarkable courage and leadership under fire. Despite being wounded, he led multiple attacks against enemy positions and helped evacuate wounded soldiers. His second was from his actions during the First Battle of El Alamein in July 1942, where once again he demonstrated bravery and resilience in the face of intense enemy fire, despite being severely wounded.

After the war, Upham returned to New Zealand, where he continued to farm and became involved in veterans' affairs. He famously rejected offers of financial assistance, preferring to live a quiet life dedicated to his family and community. He died on 22 November 1994 at the age of 86. A state funeral in Christchurch Cathedral on 25 November 1994 was conducted with full military honours, and he was buried in the graveyard of St Paul's Anglican Church.

== Early life ==
Upham was born in Christchurch on 21 September 1908, the son of John Hazlitt Upham, a lawyer, and his wife, Agatha Mary Coates. His father was a great-grandson of artist John Hazlitt, while his mother was a granddaughter of pioneer colonist Guise Brittan. He grew up a quiet, shy boy, very gentlemanly and courteous, and "no trouble at all". He was not a strong child physically, as well as having a slightly shorter leg than the other, leading to a doctor suspecting Upham of having a mild case of poliomyelitis. He boarded at Waihi School, near Winchester, South Canterbury, between 1917 and 1922 and boarded at Christ's College, Christchurch, from 1923 to 1927.

[Upham] was quiet and unassuming, despite his nickname of "Puggie". Rather shy, not a very good mixer, he would walk over to school with a group of boys, not talking and chaffing with them, but head down and brow furrowed, completely wrapped up in his own thoughts. He took things more seriously than others. He was a lone ranger. Though normally placid, now and then he showed he was capable of a deep fierce temper if he were aroused. But you could rely on him implicitly. I would risk anything on his word – and once having given his word, nothing would budge him.

— Mr. H. E. Solomon, Upham's housemaster at Christ's College

Upham's father was disappointed when his only son elected not to study law and join his father's practice, Charles stating, "I'd always be jealous of my friends on farms". So Upham's father enrolled Charles at Canterbury Agricultural College (now known as Lincoln University), where the practical and theoretical sciences of farming are taught at the university level, joining in 1928.

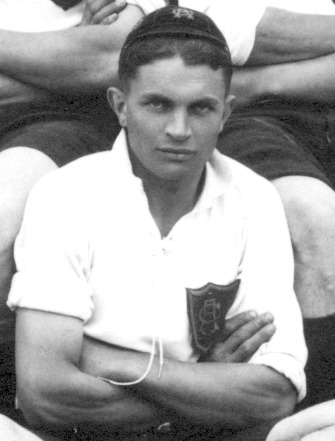
Upham in 1929

Upham rapidly found himself enthralled with the work. He plunged into the farm and study courses with an enthusiasm that convinced his parents that, after all, it was the right choice. For two years he was first in agriculture and gained firsts also in veterinary science and economics. With a diploma of agriculture, Upham left Canterbury Agricultural College in 1930 to begin life on the land. For the next six years, he learnt his craft in the hills, gullies, and plains of Canterbury. He worked as shepherd, musterer and farm manager.

In 1935, at Riccarton Park Racecourse, he met Molly McTamney, who was a distant relative of Noel Godfrey Chavasse. She was a dietitian working at Christchurch Hospital, after four years of hospital nursing. She was described as "brunette, pretty, and gay". They danced together that evening, and the next day Upham was waiting as she came off duty. He had an armful of red roses for her and he proposed marriage, but she declined, although they both continued in a relationship.

In March 1937, he joined the Government Valuation Department, firstly under supervision, then alone, where Upham quickly assimilated the techniques of land valuation. He was aided by the scientific knowledge gained at Canterbury Agricultural College, but much more by his extensive experience of Canterbury land during his six years' work in the province. The following year, he became engaged to McTamney. In February 1939, granted leave from the Valuation Department, Upham returned to Canterbury Agricultural College to take a course in valuation and farm management.

Now somewhat of an elder statesman, by virtue of his earlier days at the college and his wide farming experience, Upham became a popular favourite of his fellow students. He helped them liberally with their own studies, he played football with just as much vigour as before. The course he took was restricted to men of wide practical backgrounds and was designed primarily to train men for managerial posts in government departments. At the end of the year, he had no trouble with the necessary exams, obtaining his Diploma in Valuation and Farm Management. But the darkening months of 1939 saw Upham thinking more and more deeply about events on the other side of the world.

== Second World War ==
With the call for volunteers in September 1939, after the outbreak of the Second World War, he enlisted in the 2nd New Zealand Expeditionary Force (2NZEF) at the age of 30, and was posted to the 20th Canterbury-Otago Battalion, part of the New Zealand 2nd Division.

To the Commanding Officer,
Burnham Military Camp,
Burnham.

Dear Sir, A young man by the name of Upham has left the College to join your unit. I commend him to your notice, as, unless I am greatly mistaken, he should be an outstanding soldier.

— Professor Eric Hudson, Canterbury Agricultural College Principal, October 1939

Although he already had five years' experience in the New Zealand Army Territorial Force, in which he held the rank of sergeant, he signed on as a private. He was soon promoted to temporary lance corporal, but initially declined a place in an Officer Cadet Training Unit (OCTU). In December, he was promoted to sergeant and six days later sailed for Egypt.

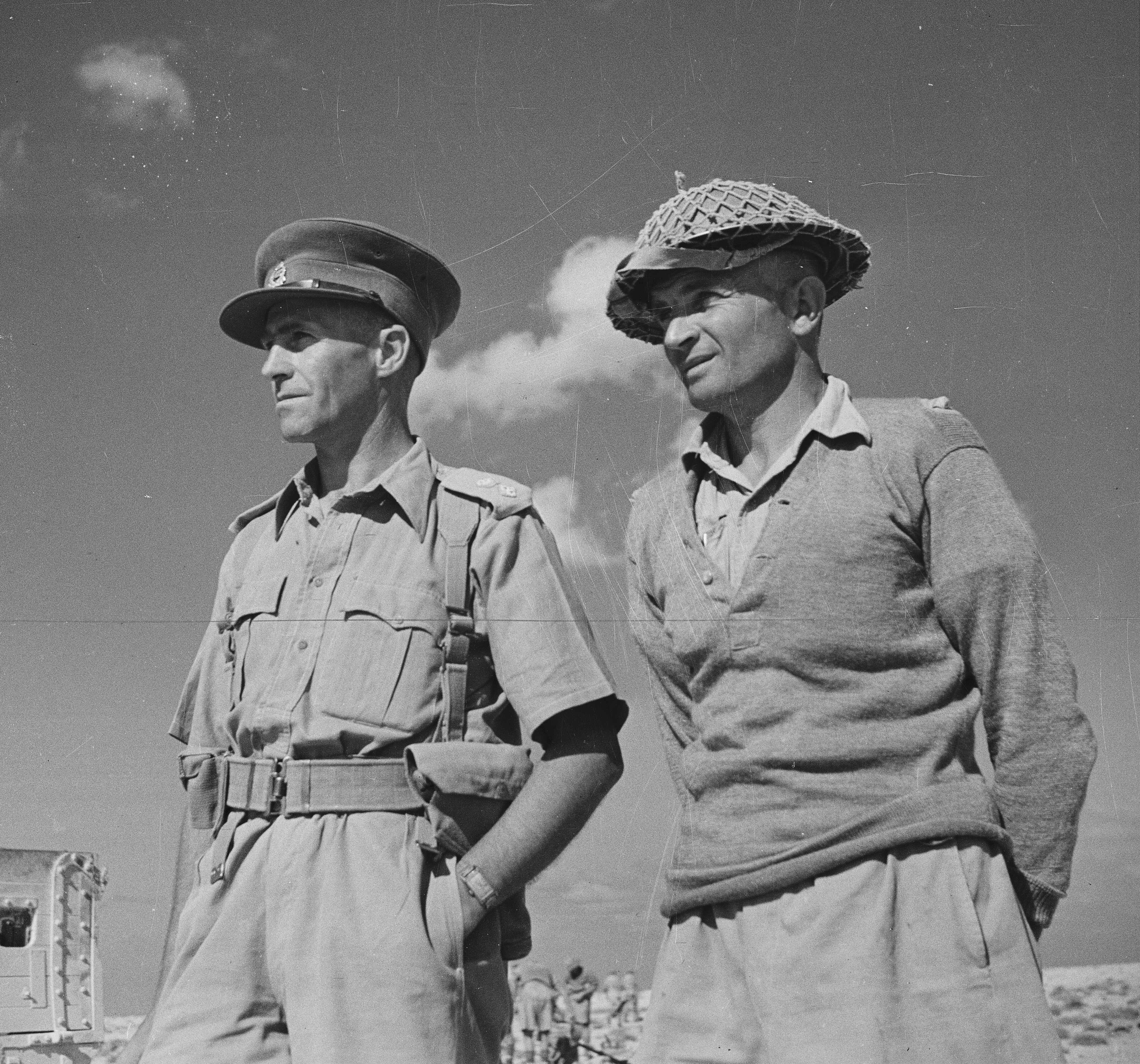
Lieutenant Charles Upham (right) with Lieutenant Colonel Howard Kippenberger in Egypt, c.1941

In July 1940, Charles Upham was persuaded to attend the Officer Cadet Training Unit in Egypt. Upon successfully completing the course, he was commissioned as a second lieutenant on 2 November and given command of a platoon in 20th Battalion. Upham quickly won the respect of his men as a capable officer who was greatly concerned for their safety and comfort.

=== Battle of Greece and Crete ===
In March 1941, the New Zealand Expeditionary Force was deployed to Greece as part of the Allied attempt to counter the German-Italian invasion there. In a short-lived campaign, the Axis forces swept through Greece, resulting in 50,000 Allied troops having to be evacuated by the Royal Navy. Just over a third of their force was now deployed on the Greek island of Crete. The day after a German landing, Upham's company were part of a counter-attack, the goal of which was to retake the airfield at Maleme. Upham led the 20th and the 28th (Māori) Battalion in an attack on several German machine gun posts. Advancing 3,000 yards (2,700 m) under fire with no artillery support, Upham's men took out the first machine gun using grenades and pistols. Upham himself then crept up to a house where another machine gun was based and tossed in some grenades to end their resistance. A further machine gun now opened up on the New Zealanders. Once more, their officer took it upon himself to crawl to within 15 yards (14 m) of the Germans, lobbing some grenades into the enemy position. However, despite Upham's successes, the Allied counter-attack failed due to German air superiority. They were forced to withdraw. As they retreated under German fire, Upham carried a wounded man back to safety and then encouraged several of his men to do likewise. While Upham got his platoon out, it now transpired that one company had not received the order to withdraw and was now isolated behind the advancing German lines. Upham, accompanied by a corporal, ran 600 yards (550 m) through the German lines, killing two Germans en route, and successfully led the company back to safety.

The Allies fought a desperate retreat towards the south of the island in the hope of yet another evacuation. During the following two days, his platoon occupied an exposed position on forward slopes and was continuously under fire. Upham was blown over by one mortar shell and painfully wounded by a piece of shrapnel behind the left shoulder by another. He disregarded the wound and remained on duty. He also received a bullet in the foot which he later removed in Egypt. On 25 May at Galatas, Upham's platoon stopped under cover of a ridge, observed the enemy, and brought the platoon forward when the Germans advanced. They killed over forty with fire and grenades and forced the remainder to fall back.

Each time the Allies tried to hold a line, the Germans broke through. On one occasion, in this fast-moving situation, Upham left his platoon to retreat under his sergeant, while he went forward to warn another company that was about to be left behind. Suddenly he ran into two Germans, who opened fire. Falling to the ground, Upham pretended to be dead. While feigning death, he managed to rest his gun on the fork of a tree trunk and as the Germans came close, he opened fire, killing both of them. The second German was so close that he fell onto the muzzle of Upham's rifle.

On 30 May at Sfakia his platoon was ordered to deal with an enemy party which had advanced down a ravine near Force Headquarters. Though exhausted, he climbed the steep hill to the west of the ravine, placed his men in positions on the slope overlooking the ravine and himself went to the top with a Bren gun and two riflemen. By clever tactics, he induced the enemy party to expose itself and then at a range of 500 yards (460 m) shot 22 and caused the remainder to disperse in panic. During the whole of the operations he suffered from diarrhoea and was able to eat very little, in addition to being wounded and bruised.

For his actions in the Battle of Crete, his commanding officer, Lieutenant Colonel Howard Kippenberger, recommended Upham for the Victoria Cross. Charles Upham was totally against the award, modestly feeling that it was undeserved. Eventually, his commanding officer convinced him that it was for his bravery and the service of the whole unit. He was gazetted for the VC in October 1941.

=== First VC ===
Citation

War Office, 14th October, 1941.

The KING has been graciously pleased to approve of awards of the Victoria Cross to the undermentioned: —

Second Lieutenant Charles Hazlitt Upham (8077), New Zealand Military Forces.

During the operations in Crete this officer performed a series of remarkable exploits, showing outstanding leadership, tactical skill and utter indifference to danger.

He commanded a forward platoon in the attack on Maleme on 22nd May and fought his way forward for over 3,000 yards unsupported by any other arms and against a defence strongly organised in depth. During this operation his platoon destroyed numerous enemy posts but on three occasions sections were temporarily held up.

In the first case, under a heavy fire from a machine gun nest he advanced to close quarters with pistol and grenades, so demoralizing the occupants that his section was able to "mop up" with ease.

Another of his sections was then held up by two machine guns in a house. He went in and placed a grenade through a window, destroying the crew of one machine gun and several others, the other machine gun being silenced by the fire of his sections.

In the third case he crawled to within 15 yards of an M.G. post and killed the gunners with a grenade.

When his Company withdrew from Maleme he helped to carry a wounded man out under fire, and together with another officer rallied more men together to carry other wounded men out.

He was then sent to bring in a company which had become isolated. With a Corporal he went through enemy territory over 600 yards, killing two Germans on the way, found the company, and brought it back to the Battalion's new position. But for this action it would have been completely cut off.

During the following two days his platoon occupied an exposed position on forward slopes and was continuously under fire. Second Lieutenant Upham was blown over by one mortar shell, and painfully wounded by a piece of shrapnel behind the left shoulder, by another. He disregarded this wound and remained on duty. He also received a bullet in the foot which he later removed in Egypt.

At Galatas on 25th May his platoon was heavily engaged and came under severe mortar and machine-gun fire. While his platoon stopped under cover of a ridge Second-Lieutenant Upham went forward, observed the enemy and brought the platoon forward when the Germans advanced. They killed over 40 with fire and grenades and forced the remainder to fall back.

When his platoon was ordered to retire he sent it back under the platoon Sergeant and he went back to warn other troops that they were being cut off. When he came out himself he was fired on by two Germans. He fell and shammed dead, then crawled into a position and having the use of only one arm rested his rifle in the fork of a tree and as the Germans came forward he killed them both. The second to fall actually hit the muzzle of the rifle as he fell.

On 30th May at Sphakia his platoon was ordered to deal with a party of the enemy which had advanced down a ravine to near Force Headquarters. Though in an exhausted condition he climbed the steep hill to the west of the ravine, placed his men in positions on the slope overlooking the ravine and himself went to the top with a Bren Gun and two riflemen. By clever tactics he induced the enemy party to expose itself and then at a range of 500 yards shot 22 and caused the remainder to disperse in panic.

During the whole of the operations he suffered from dysentery and was able to eat very little, in addition to being wounded and bruised.

He showed superb coolness, great skill and dash and complete disregard of danger. His conduct and leadership inspired his whole platoon to fight magnificently throughout, and in fact was an inspiration to the Battalion.

— London Gazette, 14 October 1941

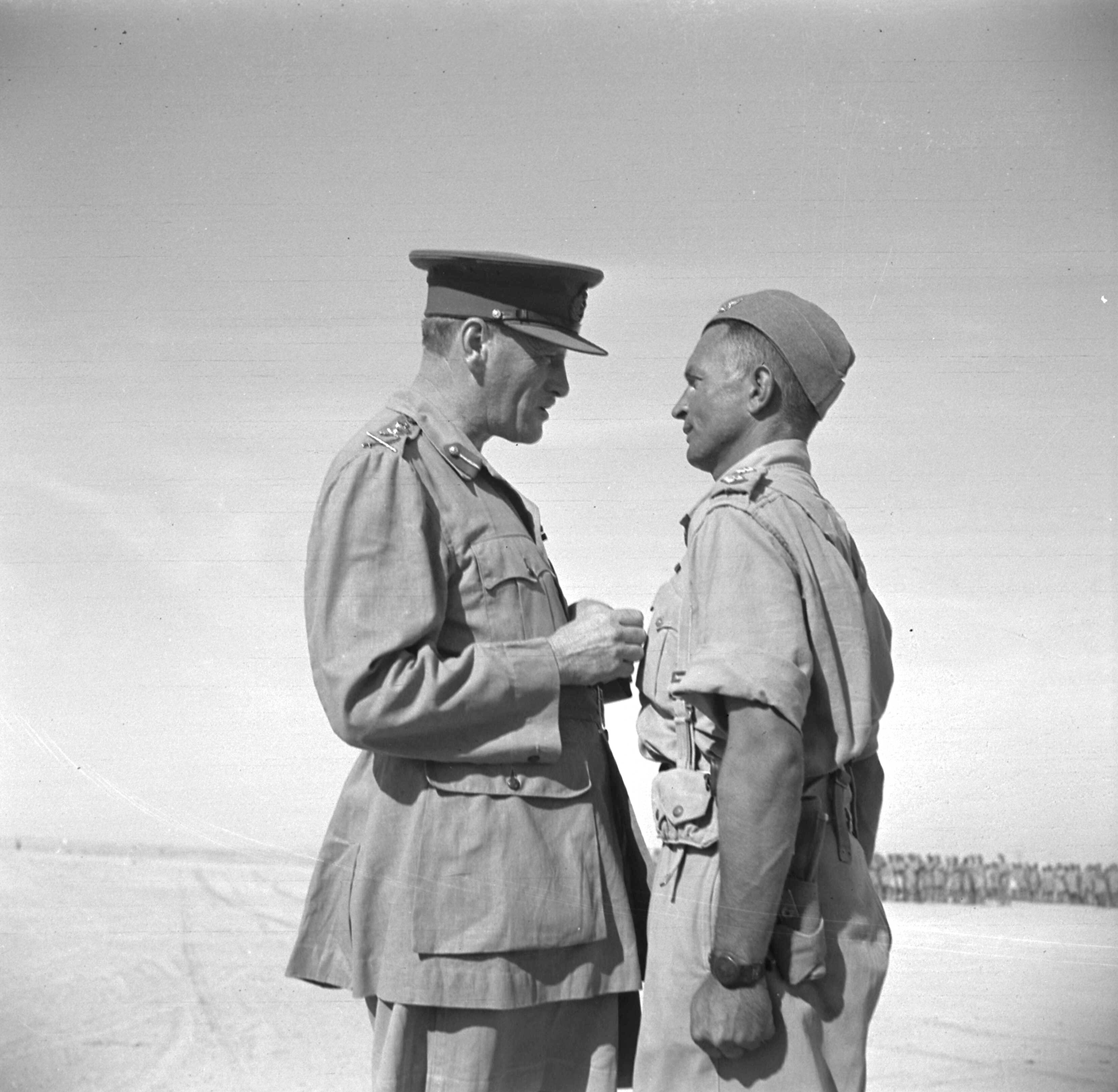
Claude Auchinleck presents VC ribbon to Upham, 4 November 1941

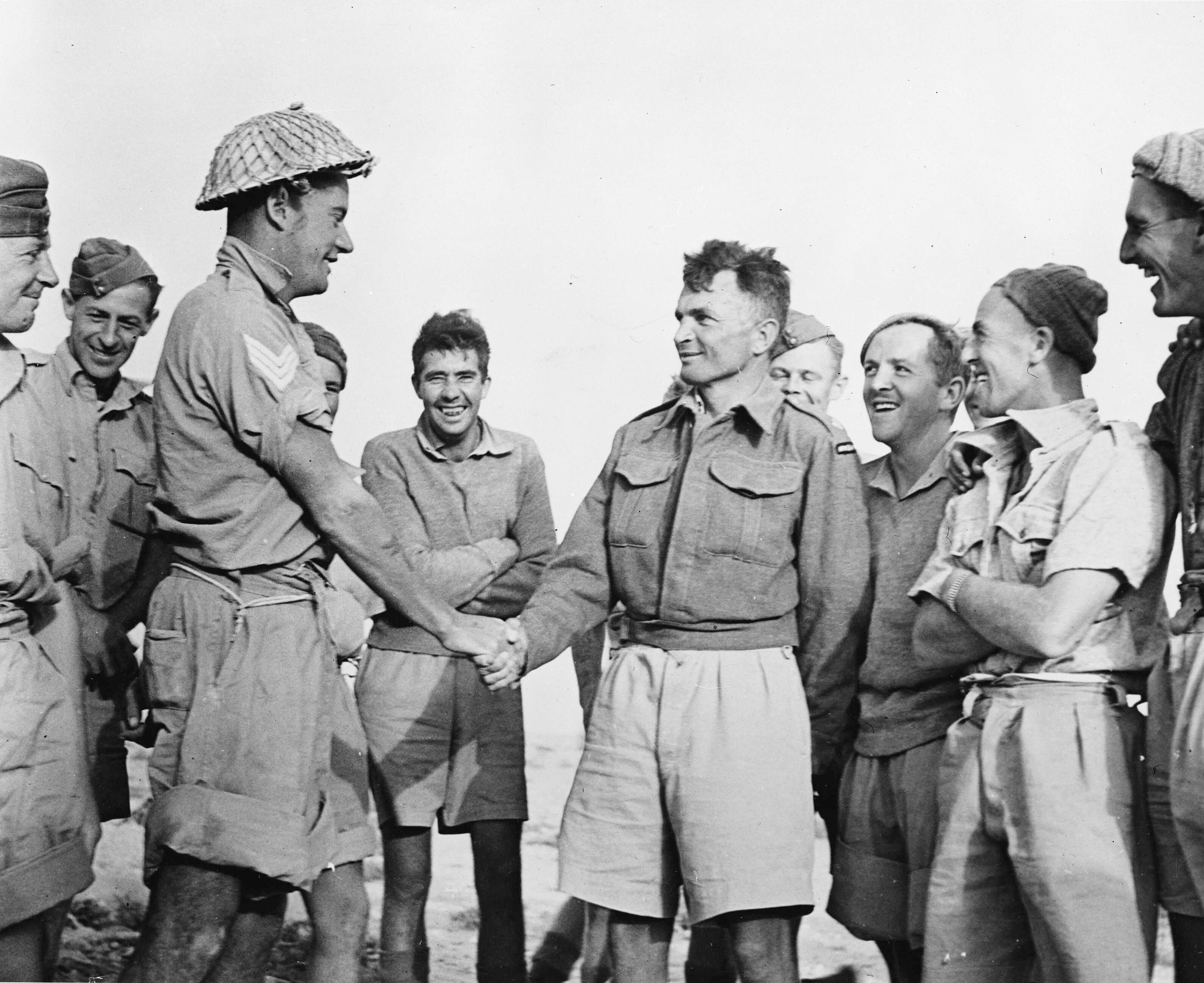
Upham being congratulated by his platoon sergeant after the presentation of the Victoria Cross in November 1941

General Sir Claude Auchinleck presented Upham with his VC ribbon at a ceremonial parade by 4 Brigade on 4 November 1941.

=== North African campaign ===
In November 1941 he was annoyed when his commanding officer, Lieutenant Colonel H. K. Kippenberger, decided to leave him out of the second Libyan campaign. Kippenberger believed that Upham "was fretting for more action" and "would get himself killed too quickly". The battalion suffered heavy losses in the campaign, and Upham helped rebuild it as commander of C Company. He was promoted to lieutenant at the time. Upham and the rest of the 2nd New Zealand Expeditionary Force now formed part of the British Eighth Army, based in Egypt. Upham would stay in the Eighth Army until the end of the war, first in North Africa. In late 1941 and early 1942, the Eighth Army were on the defensive, being pushed back by Erwin Rommel's Afrika Korps.

In late June 1942, the New Zealanders were in danger of being completely cut off as Rommel swept into Egypt. On the night of 27 June, they desperately made a break for British lines. The ensuing battle saw Captain Upham's company participate in fierce hand-to-hand fighting with the Germans. Upham used grenades to lethal effect. In fact, he threw them at such short range that he was injured in both arms by shrapnel from his own grenades. The breakout was a success, and the New Zealand Division was moved into the defensive line centred on the small railway town of El Alamein.

The New Zealanders were positioned to the south of the town and ordered to take the high ground at El Ruasat Ridge. The attack began at 11 pm on 14 July. Along the ridge, they met fierce resistance from the Germans. Upham's own company found themselves facing four machine gun nests and several tanks holding the high ground. Once more, Upham inspired his men to press home their attack. And once more, grenades were key to their assault. Upham was credited with personally destroying several machine gun posts and a tank as they stormed the ridge. In the process, he was shot in the elbow by one of the machine guns. Refusing to leave the battlefield, he got his wounds dressed as best they could at a regimental aid post and then went back to his men.

The following day, the Germans and their Italian allies launched a ferocious counterattack, during which Upham was hit in the leg by shrapnel. Unable to move, he and the remaining six men of his company were captured, along with about a thousand fellow New Zealanders. He became a prisoner of war on 15 July 1942.

=== Prisoner of war ===
After being taken prisoner of war (POW), he was sent to an Italian hospital where an Italian doctor recommended his wounded arm be amputated, but Upham refused due to lack of anaesthesia, as he had seen other patients die as well as be in severe pain. He later had the wound dressed by an Allied POW doctor. After recovering enough to be moved, Upham was transferred to Campo P.G. 47 in Modena, Italy in March 1943. This camp, like many others, was harsh and strictly monitored. Upham made his first serious escape attempt here. His cell had one weakness – they had plaster board ceilings. Moving his bed vertically, he smashed it into the ceiling, but a secondary ceiling wired together prevented him from escaping. He was caught soon after.

In September 1943, following the Italian Armistice, many POWs in Italy were moved to German camps. While Upham was being transported in a truck, he jumped in a bend and managed to get 400 yards (370 m) away before being recaptured. He also broke his ankle in the process.

Charles Upham tangled in coiled barbed wire after trying to escape from a German prisoner of war camp, c.1943

Upham arrived at Weinsberg Camp (Oflag Va). On one occasion, he tried to escape by climbing its fences in broad daylight. He became entangled in barbed wire when he fell between the two fences. When a guard pointed a pistol at his head and threatened to shoot, Upham calmly ignored him and lit a cigarette. This scene was photographed by the Germans as evidence.

Due to his persistent escape attempts, Upham was eventually transferred to Oflag IV-C at Colditz Castle in late 1943, a fortress renowned for housing persistent and high-profile Allied escapees. On the trip to Colditz, Upham tried to escape while on a train. During his transfer on the civilian train, while guarded by two Germans, Upham made his final escape attempt. Upham was only allowed to visit the toilet when the train was travelling at high speed to prevent him from jumping through a window. Nevertheless, Upham prised open the toilet window and jumped onto the tracks, knocking himself unconscious. After awakening, he escaped into a nearby orchard, but the even rows of trees and lack of undergrowth provided poor cover, and he was soon recaptured.

As the war drew to a close in 1945, Colditz Castle was liberated by the advancing Allied forces. Upham, along with the other prisoners, was freed, bringing an end to his nearly three-year ordeal as a POW. He headed for the headquarters of the American unit that had captured the town. Upham selected the goods he had come for. He changed into the American combat uniform, fitted on the boots and the U.S. helmet. Then the arms – the Tommy gun, the revolver, two grenades, compass. He prepared to go into action with the Americans. For four days Upham stayed with the U.S. forces in the Colditz area, clothed and equipped as one of them, waiting for the call forward. The pressure of higher orders finally caught him up. "Under no circumstances are released P.O.W.s to be permitted to join active service units, unofficially or otherwise. P.O.W.s are to be evacuated without exception." He reluctantly left the Americans and was soon travelling to England.

In England, he was reunited with McTamney, who was then serving as a nurse. They were married at Barton on Sea, Hampshire, on 20 June 1945. He returned to New Zealand in early September, and she followed him in December.

=== VC presentation ===
King George VI invested Upham with his Victoria Cross at Buckingham Palace on 11 May 1945. In their exchange, King George said "Well, Captain Upham, I believe this is not your only award. I'm told you've just received a mentioned in dispatches for your attempts to escape. Congratulations for that, too. Tell me, though, what have you been doing since you arrived in London?". "Mostly eating, sir" Upham replied. They later walked through St James's Park together.

=== Bar to VC ===
When the recommendation was made for a second VC, the king asked Major-General Howard Kippenberger "What do you think of Upham yourself? Does he deserve another VC?" Kippenberger replied, "I was his Brigadier in North Africa, sir. He did so many brave things, in my respectful opinion, Captain Upham won the VC several times over".

Colonel Burrows approached Kippenberger after the Minqar Qaim action and was already mooting the nomination for a second VC even before the battle at Ruweisat Ridge and Upham's capture. General Lindsay Inglis received citations for both Minqar Qaim and Ruweisat that each individually suggested Upham merited the VC for either occasion independently, but because of the excessive rarity of multiple VC awards, he opted to combine the citations into a single one forwarded to the king.

Citation

War Office, 26th September, 1945.

The KING has been graciously pleased to approve the award of a Bar to the VICTORIA CROSS to: —

Captain Charles Hazlitt UPHAM, V.C. (8077), New Zealand Military Forces.

Captain C. H. Upham, V.C., was commanding a Company of New Zealand troops in the Western Desert during the operations which culminated in the attack on El Ruweisat Ridge on the night of 14th–15th July, 1942.

In spite of being twice wounded, once when crossing open ground swept by enemy fire to inspect his forward sections guarding our mine-fields and again when he completely destroyed an entire truck load of German soldiers with hand grenades, Captain Upham insisted on remaining with his men to take part in the final assault.

During the opening stages of the attack on the ridge Captain Upham's Company formed part of the reserve battalion, but, when communications with the forward troops broke down and he was instructed to send up an officer to report on the progress of the attack, he went out himself armed with a Spandau gun and, after several sharp encounters with enemy machine gun posts, succeeded in bringing back the required information.

Just before dawn the reserve battalion was ordered forward, but, when it had almost reached its objective, very heavy fire was encountered from a strongly defended enemy locality, consisting of four machine gun posts and a number of tanks.

Captain Upham, without hesitation, at once led his Company in a determined attack on the two nearest strongpoints on the left flank of the sector. His voice could be heard above the din of battle cheering on his men and, in spite of the fierce resistance of the enemy and the heavy casualties on both sides, the objective was captured.

Captain Upham, during the engagement, himself destroyed a German tank and several guns and vehicles with grenades and although he was shot through the elbow by a machine gun bullet and had his arm broken, he went on again to a forward position and brought back some of his men who had become isolated. He continued to dominate the situation until his men had beaten off a violent enemy counter-attack and consolidated the vital position which they had won under his inspiring leadership.

Exhausted by pain from his wound and weak from loss of blood Captain Upham was then removed to the Regimental Aid Post but immediately his wound had been dressed he returned to his men, remaining with them all day long under heavy enemy artillery and mortar fire, until he was again severely wounded and being now unable to move fell into the hands of the enemy when, his gallant Company having been reduced to only six survivors, his position was finally overrun by superior enemy forces, in spite of the outstanding gallantry and magnificent leadership shown by Captain Upham.

The Victoria Cross was conferred on Captain Upham for conspicuous bravery during the operations in Crete in May, 1941, and the award was announced in the London Gazette dated 14th October, 1941.

— London Gazette, 26 September 1945

With this award, Upham became the third man to be awarded a Bar to the VC. The previous recipients were Lieutenant Colonel Arthur Martin-Leake and Captain Noel Godfrey Chavasse, both doctors serving in the Royal Army Medical Corps. Martin-Leake received his VC for rescuing wounded under fire in the Second Boer War, and the Bar for similar actions in the First World War. Chavasse was similarly decorated for two such actions in the First World War, subsequently dying of wounds received during his second action. Neither of these men were combatants, so Upham remains the only fighting soldier to have been decorated with the VC and Bar.

== Post-war ==
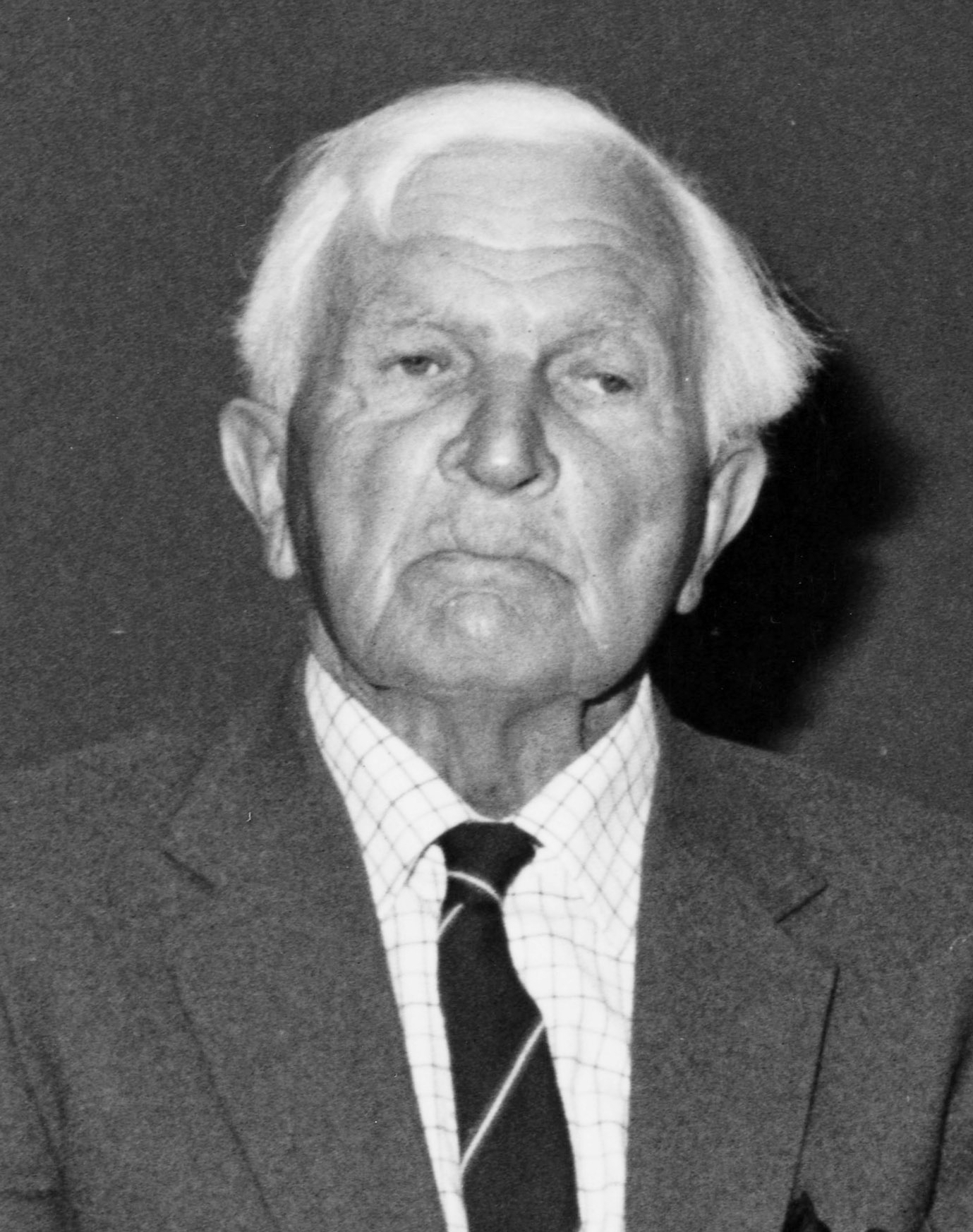
Upham in 1984

After the war, Upham returned to New Zealand, and the community raised £10,000 to buy him a farm. However, he declined and the money went into the C. H. Upham Scholarship for children of ex-servicemen to study at Canterbury Agricultural College or Canterbury College.

He obtained a war rehabilitation loan and bought a farm on Conway Flat, Hundalee, North Canterbury.

Although somewhat hampered by his injuries, he became a successful farmer and served on the board of governors of Christ's College for nearly 20 years. He and Molly had three daughters, and lived on their farm until January 1994, when Upham's poor health forced them to retire to Christchurch.

Upham was surprised with an appearance on This Is Your Life in 1985.

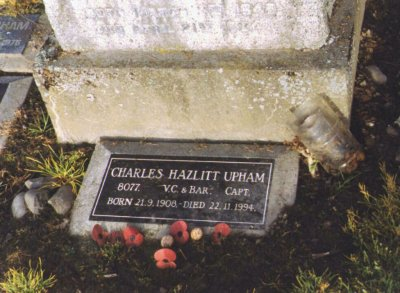
Upham's gravestone

He died in Canterbury on 22 November 1994, surrounded by his wife and daughters. His funeral in the Christ Church Cathedral was conducted with full military honours. The streets of Christchurch were lined by over 5,000 people. Upham is buried in the graveyard of St Paul's Church in Papanui. His death was also marked by a memorial service on 5 May 1995 in London's St Martin-in-the-Fields Church, attended by representatives for the Royal Family; senior New Zealand government and political figures; senior members of the British and New Zealand armed forces; Valerian Freyberg, 3rd Baron Freyberg, grandson of VC holder Lord Freyberg, the commander of Allied forces in Crete and 7th Governor-General of New Zealand; representatives of veterans' organisations; and other VC and George Cross holders.

== Victoria Cross and Bar ==
In November 2006, Upham's VC and Bar were purchased from his daughters by the Imperial War Museum for an undisclosed sum, however Minister of Defence at the time Phil Goff, announced a price of NZ$3.3 million that the family had quoted the Government for a potential purchase of the medal. New Zealand legislation prohibits the export of such historical items, so the Imperial War Museum agreed to a permanent loan of the medals to the National Army Museum at Waiouru. On 2 December 2007, Upham's VC was among nine stolen from locked, reinforced glass cabinets at the museum. On 16 February 2008, the New Zealand Police announced all the medals had been recovered as a result of a NZ$300,000 reward offered by Michael Ashcroft and Tom Sturgess.

== Legacy ==
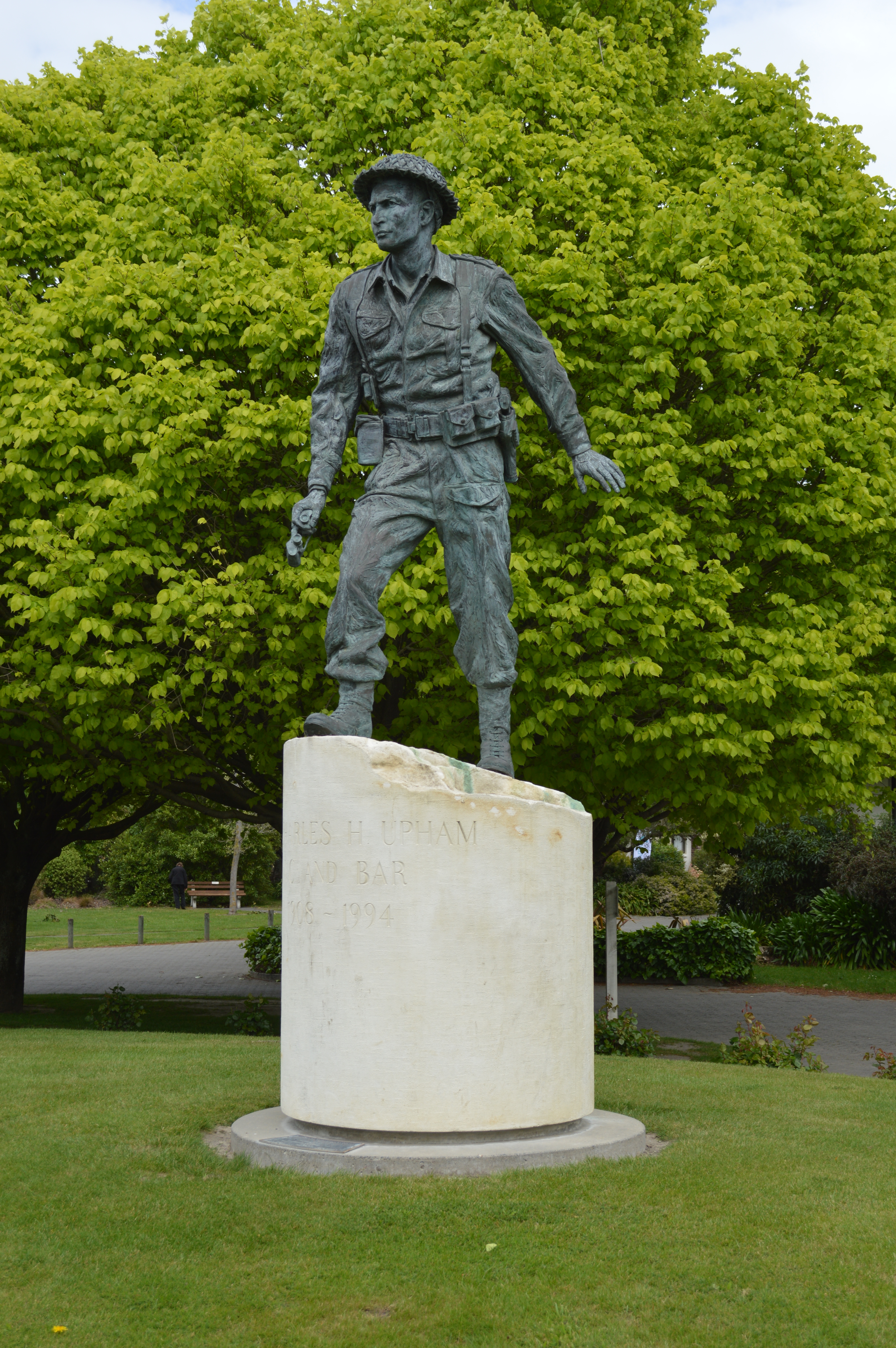
Charles Upham statue in Amberley

In 1953, Upham was awarded the Queen Elizabeth II Coronation Medal. In 1992, he was presented with the Order of Honour by the Government of Greece, in recognition of his service in the Battles of Greece and Crete.

HMNZS Charles Upham, a Royal New Zealand Navy ship, was commissioned in 1995, and decommissioned in 2001.

Upham Quadrangle at Christ's College, Christchurch contains a bronze memorial of Upham by sculptor Mark Whyte. It was installed and dedicated in May 2015.

A bronze statue stands outside the Hurunui District Council buildings in Amberley, North Canterbury, depicting Charles Upham "the observer".

A street in suburban Christchurch is named Charles Upham Avenue, and there is an Upham Terrace in Palmerston North, and an Upham Crescent in Taradale, Napier. There is also an Upham Street in Havelock North, Hawke's Bay, near streets named after fellow VC recipients Elliott, Grant, Crichton and Ngarimu.

A Jetconnect Boeing 737-800 was named Charles Upham in August 2011.

A character in 2021 game Call of Duty: Vanguard named Lucas Riggs is loosely based on Upham.

While Upham's Victoria Cross and Bar medals are securely held on public display at the National Army Museum Te Mata Toa in Waiouru, a combat sidearm—a 1916-manufactured .455 Webley Mark VI service revolver—reputedly remained privately within the Upham family estate in the South Island of New Zealand. Research cataloged by military historian and New Zealand Antique and Historical Arms Association President Andrew Edgcombe notes that the firearm lacks government "sold out of service" marks, indicating it was privately retained by Upham after his World War II deployments.

== See also ==
- New Zealand's Top 100 History Makers

== Works cited ==
- Scott, Tom (2020). Searching for Charlie: In pursuit of the real Charles Upham VC & Bar. Auckland: Upstart Press. ISBN 978-1-988516-60-8.
- Harper, Glyn; Richardson, Colin (2016). Acts of Valour: The History of the Victoria Cross and New Zealand. HarperCollins. ISBN 978-1-775540-50-2.
- Lambert, Max (1991). Who's Who in New Zealand, 1991 (12th ed.). Auckland: Octopus. ISBN 9780790001302.
- Rice, Geoffrey; Ryman, Frances (2015). Cricketing Colonists: The Brittan Brothers in Early Canterbury. Christchurch, NZ: Canterbury University Press. ISBN 978-1-927145-68-5.
- Sandford, Kenneth L. (1963). Mark of the Lion: the story of Capt. Charles Upham, V.C. and Bar. New York: Washburn.
