= Christchurch =

City in Canterbury, New Zealand

Christchurch Ōtautahi (Māori)
- City
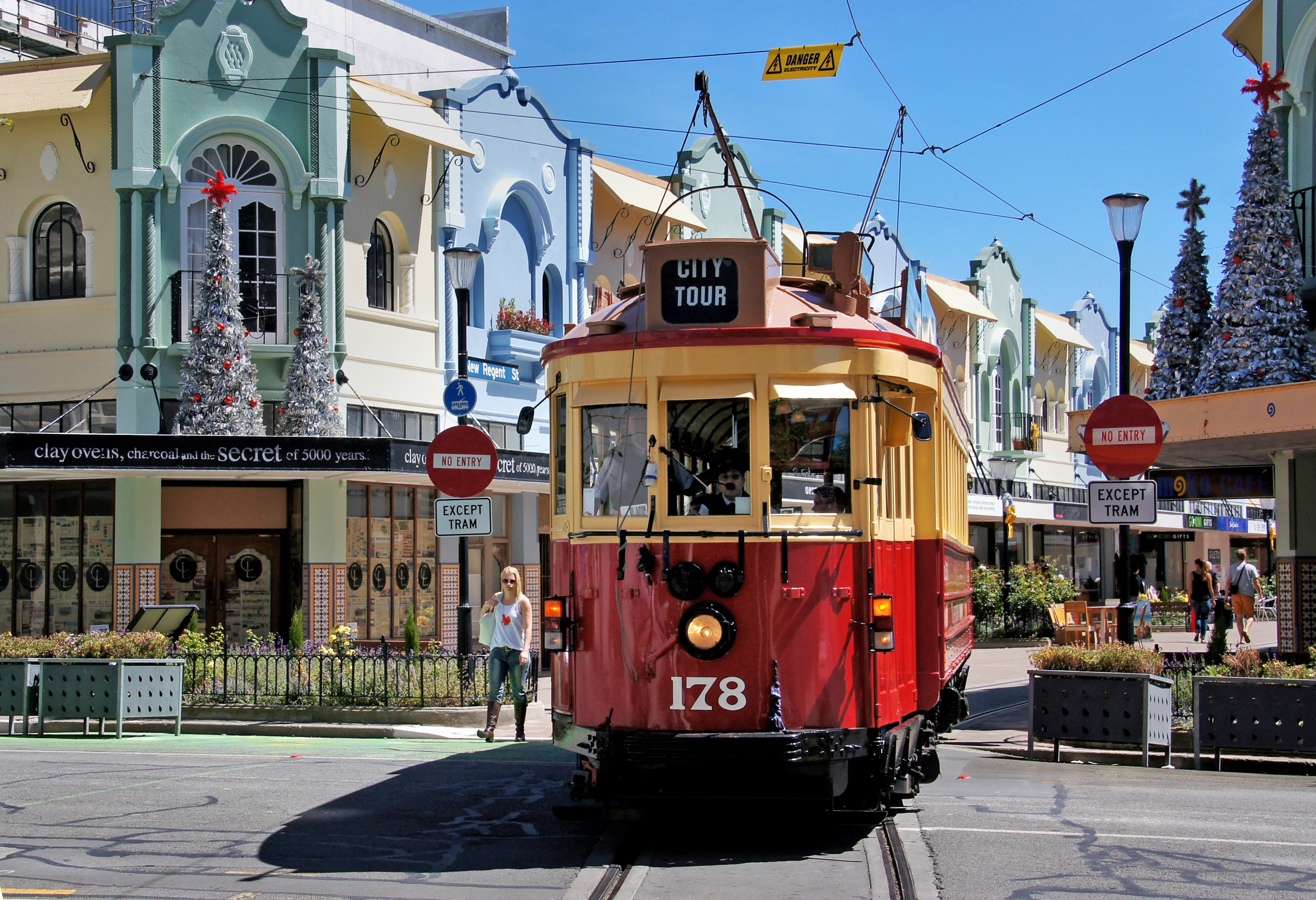
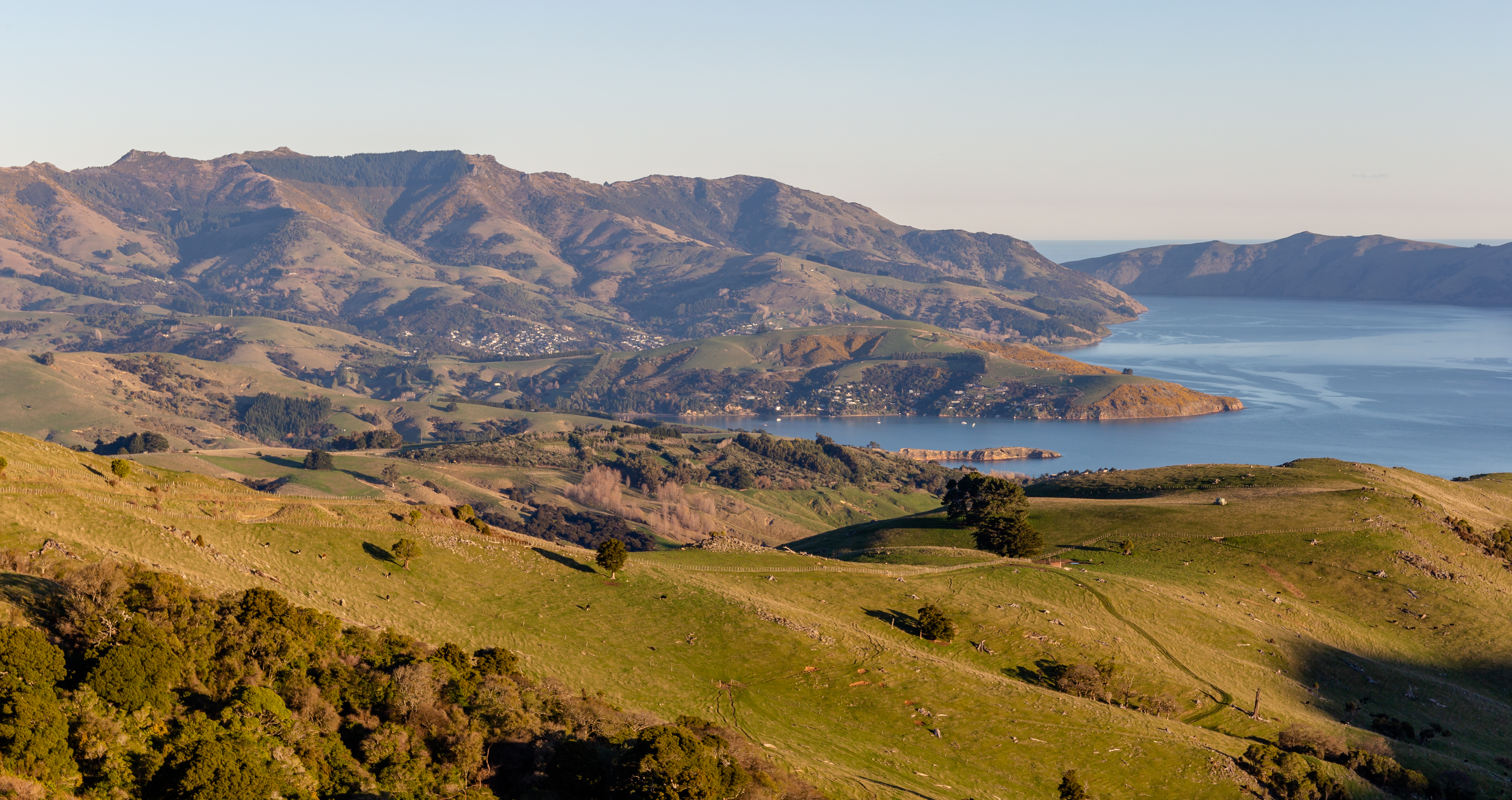
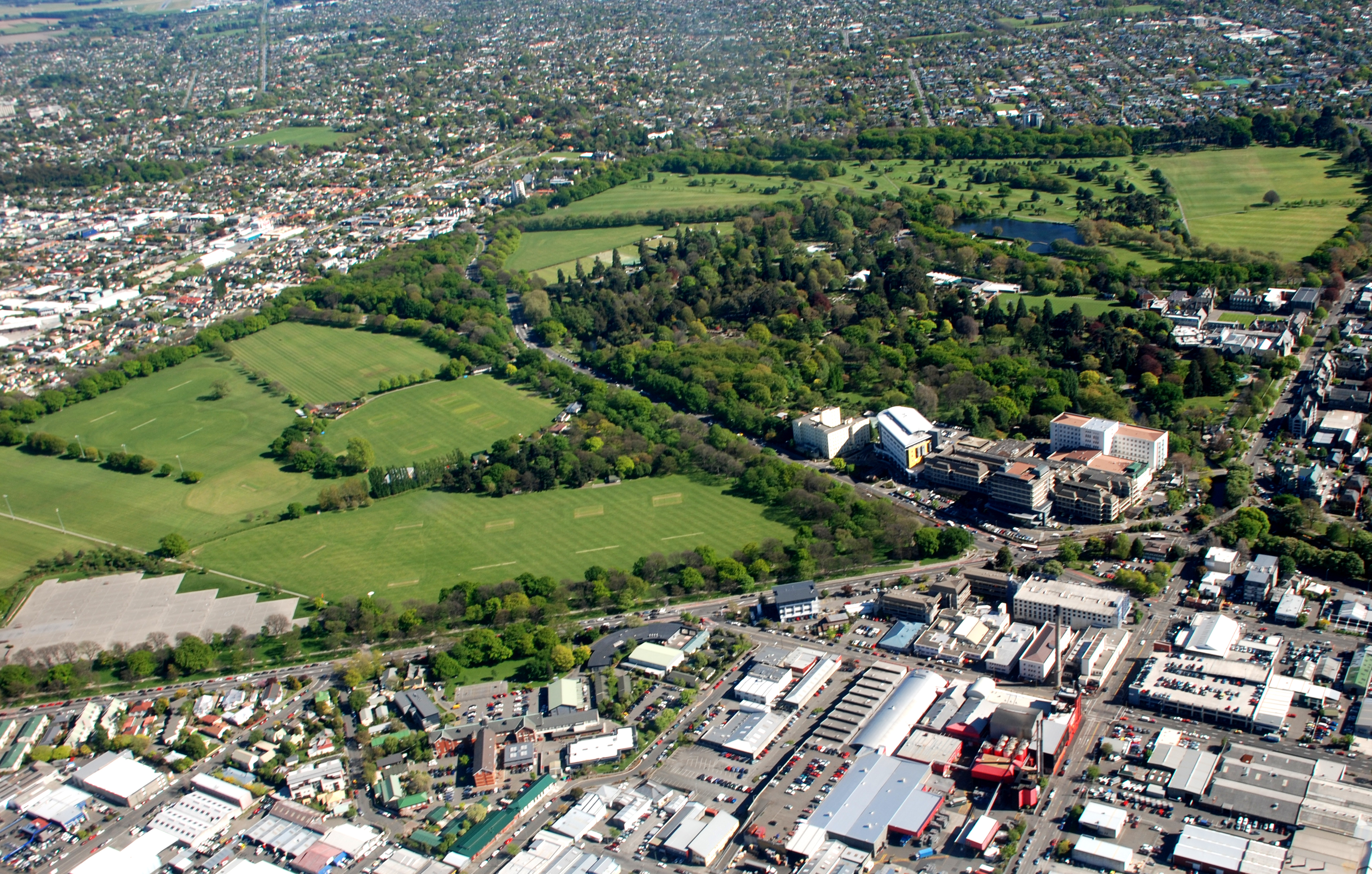
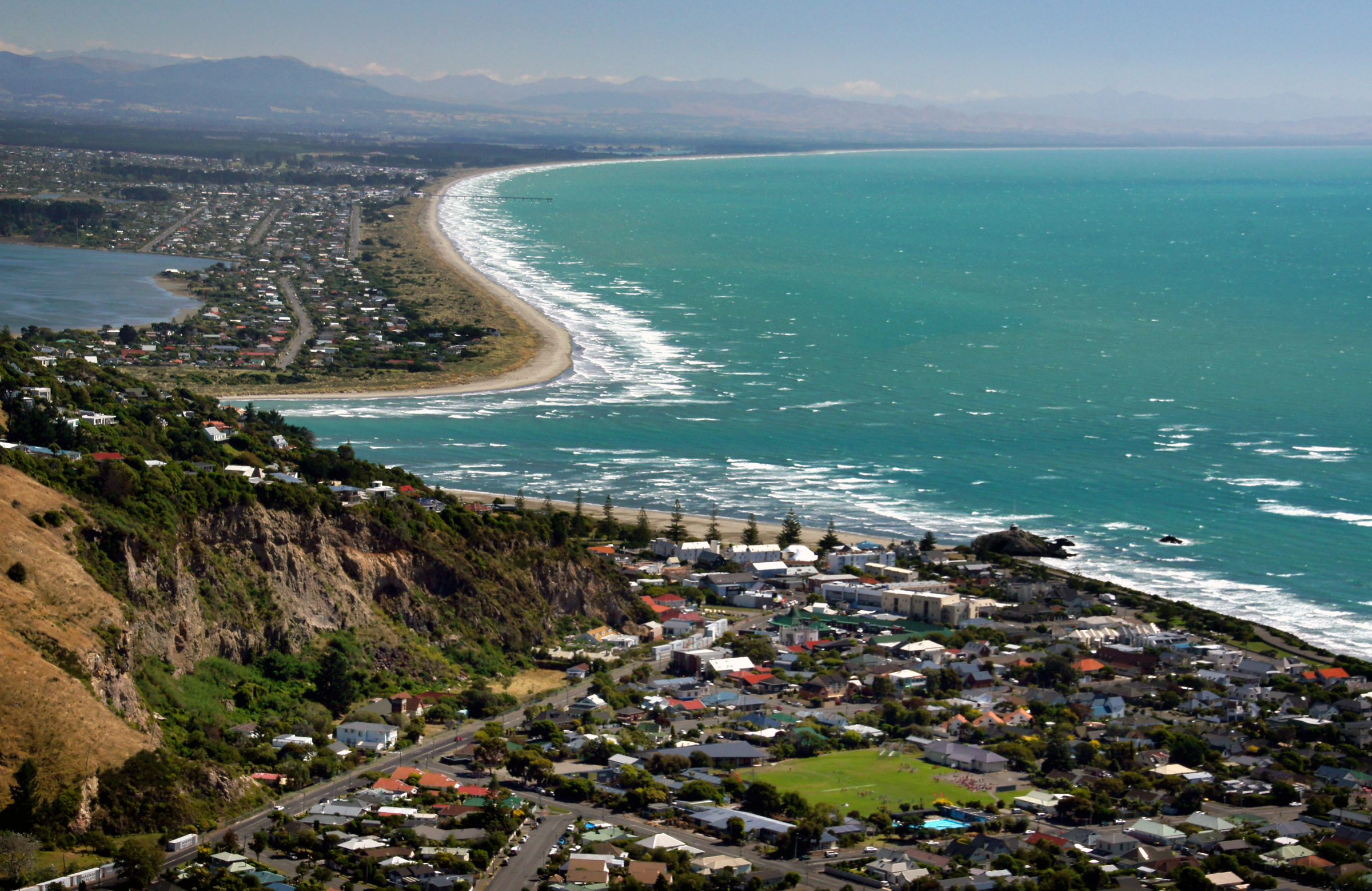
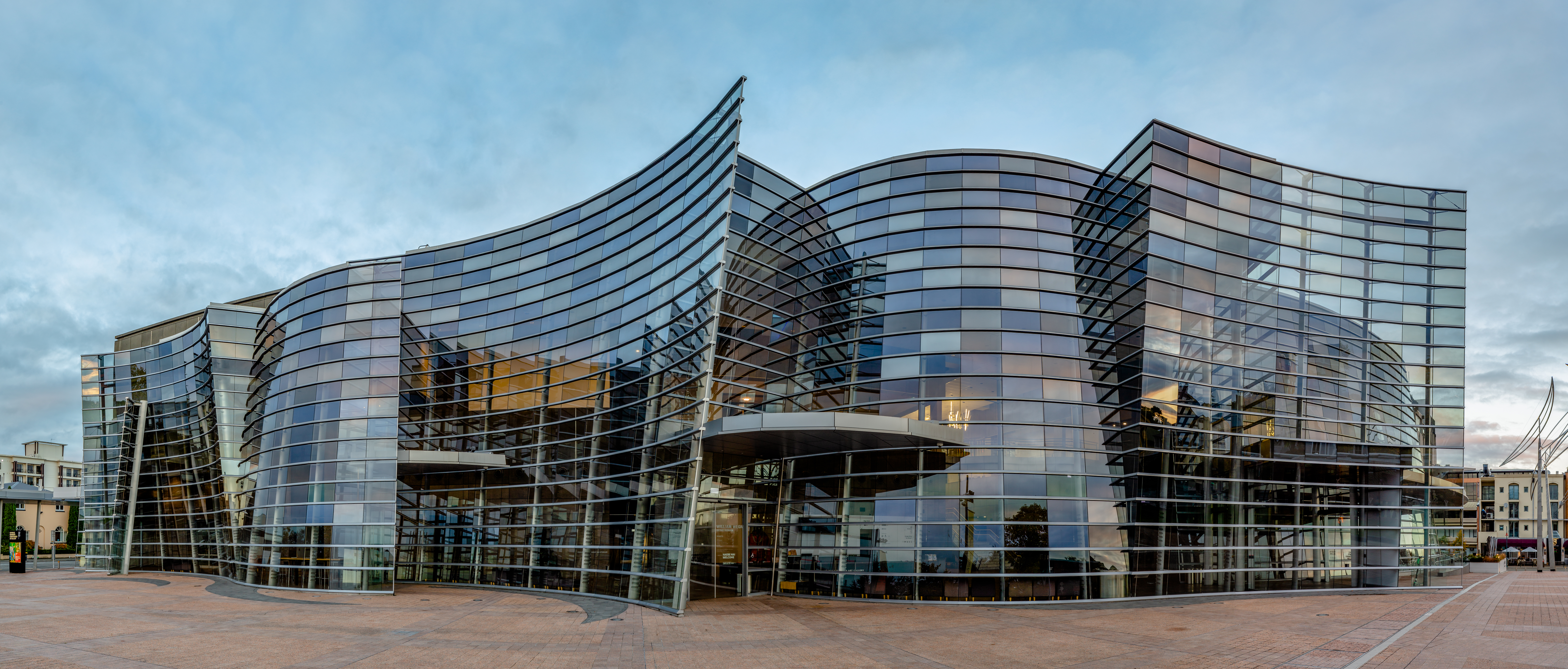
- Christchurch Central City (2020) New Regent Street Banks Peninsula and Akaroa Harbour Hagley Park Sumner and Southshore Christchurch Art Gallery

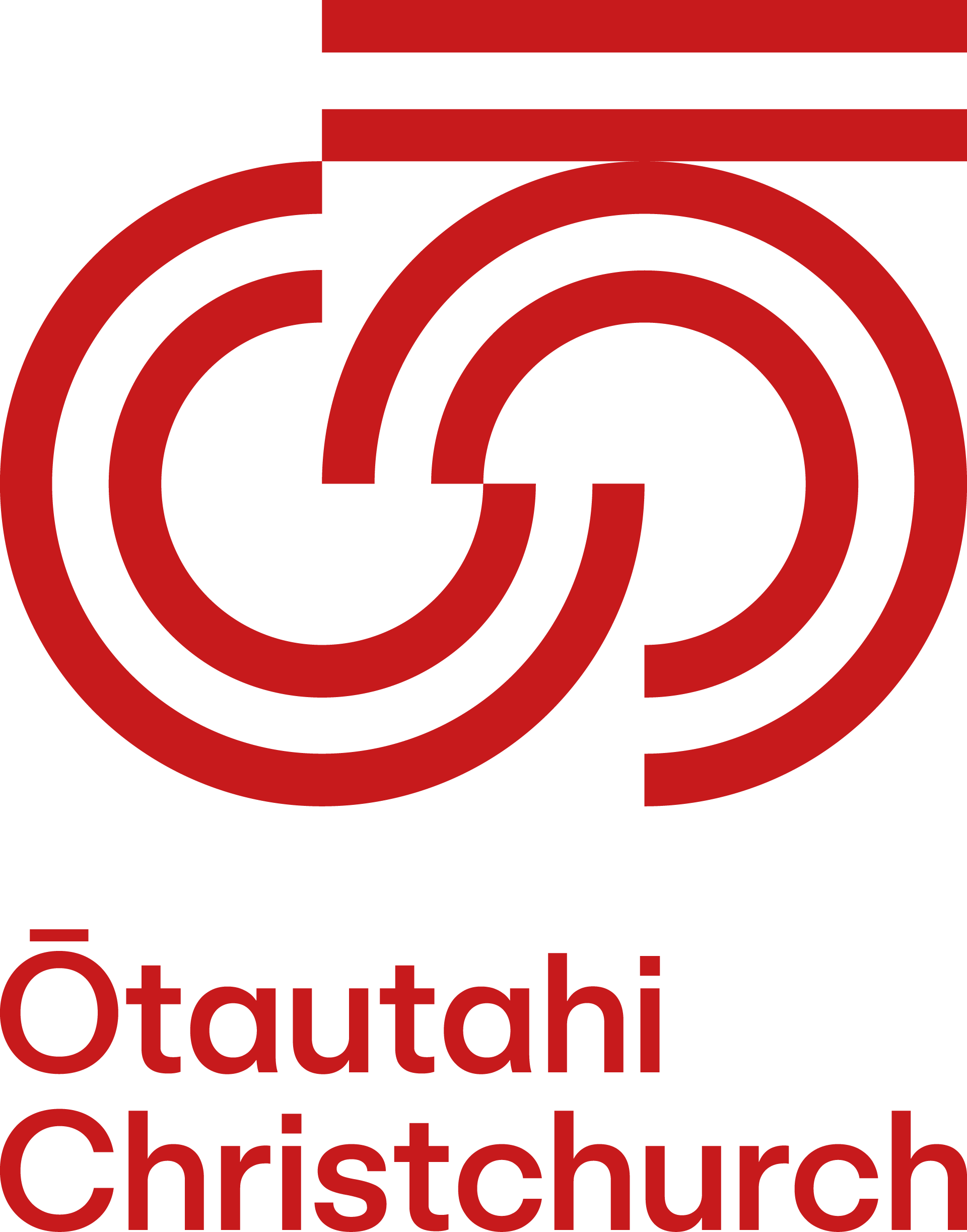
- Flag Coat of arms Brandmark
- Nickname: The Garden City
- Motto(s): Fide Condita Fructu Beata Spe Fortis; English: Founded in Faith, Rich in the Fulfillment thereof, Strong in Hope for the Future
- Interactive map of Christchurch
- Location within South Island Location within New Zealand
- Coordinates: 43°31′52″S 172°38′10″E
- Country: New Zealand
- Island: South Island
- Region: Canterbury
- Communities: Banks Peninsula; Coastal-Burwood; Fendalton-Waimairi-Harewood; Halswell-Hornby-Riccarton; Papanui-Innes; Spreydon-Cashmere
- Wards: Banks Peninsula; Burwood; Cashmere; Central; Coastal; Fendalton; Halswell; Harewood; Heathcote; Hornby; Innes; Linwood; Papanui; Riccarton; Spreydon; Waimairi
- Settlers from England: 1850; 176 years ago
- Named for: Christ Church, Oxford
- NZ Parliament: Banks Peninsula; Christchurch Central; Christchurch East; Ilam; Selwyn; Waimakariri; Wigram; Te Tai Tonga (Māori)

Government
  - Type: Mayor–Council
  - Body: Christchurch City Council
  - Mayor: Phil Mauger
  - Deputy Mayor: Pauline Cotter
  - MPs: Representatives: Matt Doocey (National); Nicola Grigg (National); Vanessa Weenink (National); Hamish Campbell (National); Tākuta Ferris (Independent); Duncan Webb (Labour); Reuben Davidson (Labour); Megan Woods (Labour)

Area
  - Territorial: 1,426 km^{2} (551 sq mi)
  - Land: 1,415.15 km^{2} (546.39 sq mi)
  - Urban: 294.43 km^{2} (113.68 sq mi)
  - Metro: 2,408.1 km^{2} (929.8 sq mi)
- Elevation: 6 m (20 ft)

Population (June 2025)
  - Territorial: 419,200
  - Density: 296.2/km^{2} (767.2/sq mi)
  - Urban: 407,800
  - Urban density: 1,385/km^{2} (3,587/sq mi)
  - Metro: 556,500
  - Metro density: 231.1/km^{2} (598.5/sq mi)
  - Demonym: Cantabrian
- Time zone: UTC+12:00 (NZST)
  - Summer (DST): UTC+13:00 (NZDT)
- Postcode(s): 8011, 8013, 8014, 8022, 8023, 8024, 8025, 8041, 8042, 8051, 8052, 8053, 8061, 8062, 8081, 8082,
- Area code: 03
- Local iwi: Kāti Māmoe, Kāi Tahu
- Website: ChristchurchNZ.com

Christchurch (/ˈkraɪs.tʃɜːrtʃ/), also known by its Māori name Ōtautahi, is the largest city in the South Island and the second-largest city by urban area population in New Zealand. (Note: Whether Christchurch or Wellington is New Zealand's second-largest city by population is debatable and depends on where the boundaries are drawn. Using Statistics New Zealand boundaries, Christchurch is the second-largest urban area (407,800 vs 209,800), territorial authority area (419,200 vs 210,800), and functional urban area (556,500 vs 441,200),) Christchurch has an urban population of 407,800, and a metropolitan population of 556,500. It is located in the Canterbury Region, near the centre of the east coast of the South Island, east of the Canterbury Plains. It is located near the southern end of Pegasus Bay, and is bounded to the east by the Pacific Ocean and to the south by the ancient volcanic complex of the Banks Peninsula. The Avon River / Ōtākaro winds through the centre of the city, with a large urban park along its banks. With the exception of the Port Hills, it is a relatively flat city, on an average about 20 m (66 ft) above sea level. Christchurch has a reputation for being an English city, with its architectural identity and nickname the 'Garden City' due to similarities with garden cities in England, but also has a historic Māori heritage. Christchurch has a temperate oceanic climate with moderate rainfall.

The area of modern-day greater Christchurch was first inhabited by the historic Māori iwi Waitaha in the mid-thirteenth century. Waitaha, who occupied the swamplands with patchworks of marshland, were invaded by Kāti Māmoe in the sixteenth century, and then were absorbed by Kāi Tahu a century later. Ōtautahi was inhabited seasonally, and a major trading centre was established at Kaiapoi Pā. British colonial settlement began in the mid-nineteenth century. The First Four Ships were chartered by the Canterbury Association and brought the Canterbury Pilgrims from Britain to Lyttelton Harbour in 1850. It became a city by letters patent on 31 July 1856, making it officially the oldest established city in New Zealand. Christchurch was heavily industrialised in the early 20th century, with the opening of the Main South Line railway and the development of state housing causing rapid growth in the city's economy and population.

Christchurch has strong cultural connections with its European elements and architectural identity. Christchurch is also home to a number of performing arts centres and academic institutions (including the University of Canterbury). Christchurch has hosted numerous international sporting events, notably the 1974 British Commonwealth Games at the purpose-built Queen Elizabeth II Park. The city has been recognised as an Antarctic gateway since 1901, and is nowadays one of the five Antarctic gateway cities hosting Antarctic support bases for several nations. Christchurch is served by the Christchurch Airport in Harewood, the country's second-busiest airport.

The city suffered a series of earthquakes from September 2010, with the most destructive occurring on 22 February 2011, in which 185 people were killed and thousands of buildings across the city suffered severe damage, with many central city buildings collapsing, leading to ongoing recovery and rebuilding projects. Christchurch later became the site of the deadliest terrorist attack in New Zealand history, which targeted two mosques on 15 March 2019.

== Toponymy ==
The name Christchurch was adopted at the first meeting of the Canterbury Association on 27 March 1848. The reason it was chosen is not known with certainty, but it was most likely named after Christ Church, Oxford, the alma mater of some members of the association, including John Robert Godley. Christ Church college had similarities with the planned new city, including its own cathedral, the smallest in England. Many of the early colonists did not like the name, preferring instead the name Lyttelton, but the Colonists' Council resolved to stick with the name of Christchurch in 1851, because it had been used by surveyors and distinguished the settlement from the port.

The Māori name for Christchurch is Ōtautahi, meaning 'the place of Tautahi'. It was adopted as the Māori name in the 1930s. Ōtautahi precisely refers to a specific site by the Avon River / Ōtākaro in Central Christchurch. The site was a seasonal food-gathering place of Ngāi Tahu chief Te Pōtiki Tautahi. A different account claims the Tautahi in question was the son of the Port Levy chief Huikai. Prior to that, Ngāi Tahu generally referred to the Christchurch area as Karaitiana, a transcription of Christchurch in the Māori language.

== History ==
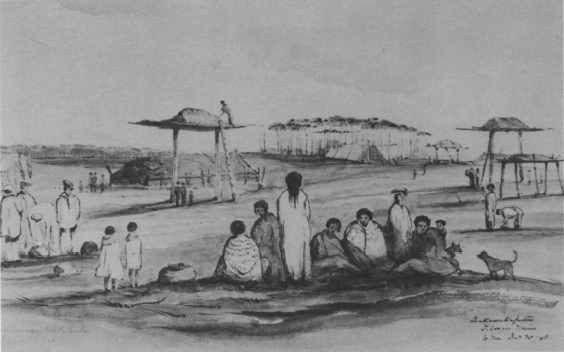
A Māori village on the Canterbury Plains with the surveyors Capt. Thomas, Heaphy, White and Torlesse on the left (sketched by William Fox in 1848).

=== Pre-city Māori activity ===
Prior to European occupation of the modern-day greater Christchurch area, the land was originally swampland with patchworks of marshland, grassland, scrub and some patches of tall forest of mostly kahikatea, mataī and tōtara. The inner coastal sand dunes were covered in hardier scrub bush, including akeake, taupata, tūmatakuru, ngaio, carmichaelia, and coprosma. Christchurch was rich in birdlife, but European colonisers burned forests to create pasture and introduced predators. This led to local extinction of many species of native birds.

Evidence of human activity in the area begins in approximately 1250 AD, with evidence of prolonged occupation beginning no later than 1350 AD. These first occupants lived in coastal caves around modern-day Sumner, and hunted local species of moa. The early settlers and their descendants became known as the historic Waitaha Māori iwi. Around c. 1500 the Kāti Māmoe iwi migrated south from the east coast of the North Island and invaded the Christchurch basin, ultimately gaining control of much of Canterbury. Kāi Tahu arrived a century later, and the two ultimately absorbed Waitaha through a mixture of conflict and marriage.

Most of the Māori settlement was along the coast. Other areas of Christchurch were also important foraging grounds and a seasonal settlement. Several Māori settlements were within Christchurch during the early-nineteenth century, such as Pūtarikamotu in modern-day Riccarton, (Note: Often spelled "Pūtaringamotu" or uncommonly, "Potoringamotu". The spelling with the Kāi Tahu dialect remains the primary Māori spelling.) and Papanui. In both cases these were located in areas of surviving tall forest. In South New Brighton there was a major Māori settlement named Te Kai-a-Te-Karoro, an important food-gathering area to Ngāi Tūāhuriri. It had kelp gulls and mānuka scrub. Te Ihutai (The Avon Heathcote Estuary) was an important food source for local iwi and hapū with the estuary providing food such as flounder and shellfish. Kaiapoi Pā was the most important trading area, and the centre of a thriving economy. The pā was located at the nexus of the major rivers of Christchurch, the Avon River / Ōtākaro, Ōpāwaho / Heathcote River and the Styx River. It was likely the richest eel fishery in the country at that time. Sugar was produced from plantations of cabbage trees.

=== Early European presence and establishment of the city, 1830–1853 ===
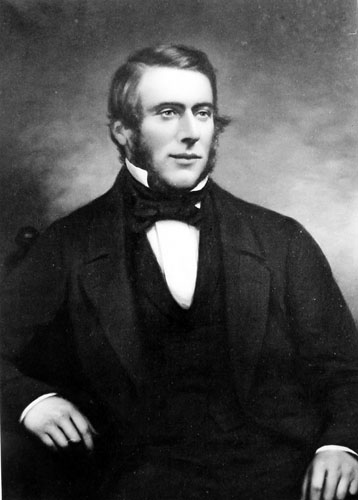
John Deans and his family were some of the early settlers in Christchurch, they settled by Riccarton Bush.

European settlement of the Canterbury region was largely influenced by brothers William and John Deans in 1843. The Deans farm located in Riccarton Bush was a crucial factor in the decision of where to place the settlement of Christchurch, as it proved that the swampy ground could be farmed. The Deans brothers named their farm after their former parish in Ayrshire, Scotland; they also named the river near their farm after the Avon Water in South Lanarkshire, which rises in the hills near to where their grandfather's farm was located.

The Canterbury Association's Chief Surveyor, Captain Joseph Thomas, surveyed the area from 1849 to 1850. Working with his assistant, Edward Jollie, they named the various ports and settlements in the area, and chose a simple grid pattern for the streets of Christchurch. The First Four Ships were chartered by the Canterbury Association and brought the Canterbury Pilgrims to Lyttelton Harbour in 1850. (Note: Lyttelton Harbour was known as Port Cooper when the four ships arrived. This name is no longer in common use. Since 1998 it has been gazetted with a dual English-Māori name, Lyttelton Harbour / Whakaraupō.) These sailing vessels were the Randolph, Charlotte Jane, Sir George Seymour, and Cressy. The journey took three to four months, and the Charlotte Jane was the first to arrive on 16 December 1850. The Canterbury Pilgrims had aspirations of building a city around a cathedral and college, on the model of Christ Church in Oxford.

Transport between the port and the new settlement at Christchurch was a major problem for the early settlers. By December 1849, Thomas had commissioned the construction of a road from Port Cooper, later Lyttelton, to Christchurch via Evans Pass and Sumner. By the time John Robert Godley arrived in April 1850, all the funds for public works had been used up in constructing the road. Godley ordered all work on the road to stop, leaving the steep foot and pack horse track that had been hastily constructed over the hill between the port and the Heathcote valley as the only land-access to the area of Christchurch. This track became known as the Bridle Path. Goods that were too heavy or bulky to be transported by pack horse over the Bridle Path were shipped by small sailing vessels some 13 kilometres (8.1 mi) by sea around the coast and up the Avon Heathcote Estuary to Ferrymead. Overturned boats at the Sumner bar were a frequent cause of new arrivals to the colony losing all their luggage. The Sumner Road was completed in 1857, though this did not alleviate the transport problems. In 1858 the provincial superintendent William Sefton Moorhouse announced that a tunnel would be dug between Lyttelton and Christchurch. While the tunnel was under construction, New Zealand's first public railway line, the Ferrymead Railway, opened from Ferrymead to Christchurch in 1863.

=== Period of the Canterbury Province, 1853–1876 ===
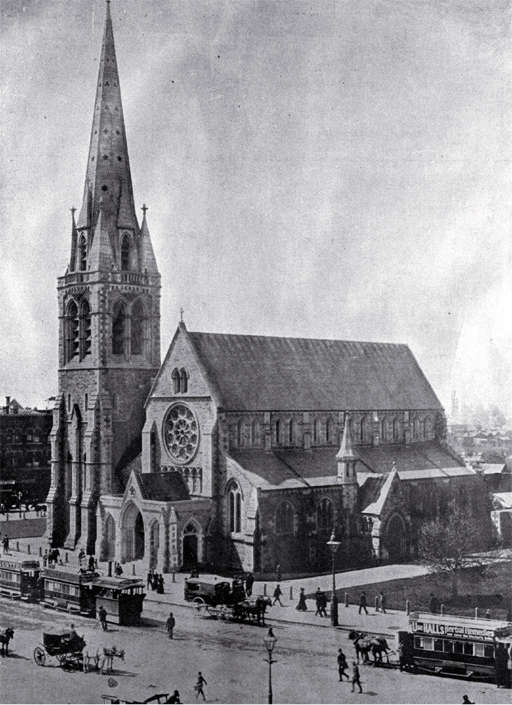
Christ Church Cathedral, with its Gothic Revival style

Between 1853 and 1876, Christchurch was the administrative seat of the Province of Canterbury. While slow at first, growth in the town began to accelerate towards the end of the 1850s, with a period of rapid growth between 1857 and 1864. Christchurch became the first city in New Zealand by letters patent on 31 July 1856, and Henry Harper was consecrated by the archbishop of Canterbury as the local Anglican bishop. He arrived in Christchurch a few months later in December 1856. In 1862 the Christchurch City Council was established. By 1874, Christchurch was New Zealand's fourth-largest city with a population of 14,270 residents. Between 1871 and 1876 nearly 20,000 immigrants arrived in Canterbury, and through the 1880s frozen meat joined wool as a primary export. The last decades of the nineteenth-century were a period of significant growth for the city, despite the national economic depression. Many of the city's stone Gothic Revival buildings by provincial architect Benjamin Mountfort date from around this period, including Canterbury University College, Christ Church Cathedral, Canterbury Museum, and the Canterbury Provincial Council Buildings, among others. Mountfort oversaw construction of a prison on Lincon Road in 1874, which operated until 1999.

Christchurch experienced a number of minor natural disasters during this period. Heavy rain caused the Waimakariri River to flood Christchurch in February 1868. Victoria Square (known as Market Place at the time) was left underwater with "the whole left side of the [Avon] river from Montreal-street bridge to Worcester street was all one lake, as deep as up to a horse's belly". Christchurch buildings were damaged by earthquakes in 1869, 1881 and 1888. The 1888 earthquake caused the highest 7.8 metres of the Christ Church Cathedral spire to collapse, many chimneys were broken, and the Durham Street Methodist Church had its stonework damaged. In November 1901, a magnitude 6.9 earthquake, centred near Cheviot, caused the spire on top of Christ Church Cathedral to collapse again, but this time only the top 1.5 metres fell. On this occasion, it was rebuilt with timber and metal instead of stone.

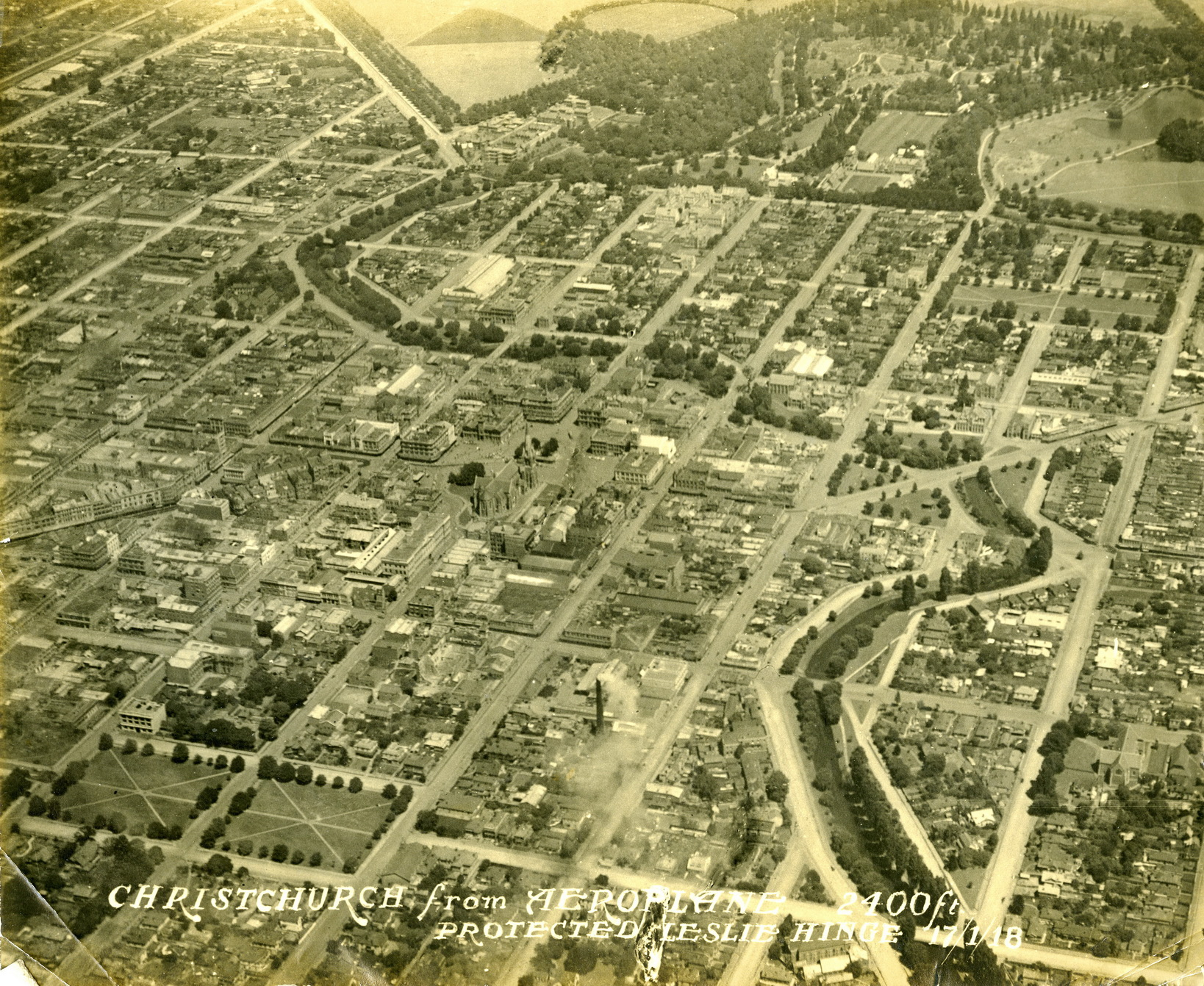
First aerial photograph of Christchurch taken by Leslie Hinge in January 1918

The Catholic Cathedral of the Blessed Sacrament was opened in February 1905. It was designed by Francis Petre with inspiration from the Saint-Vincent-de-Paul in Paris. In 1906, the New Zealand International Exhibition opened in Hagley Park, which had over a million visitors. In 1908, the city experienced its first major fire which started at the Strange's Department Store and destroyed buildings in central Christchurch on High St, Cashel St and Lichfield Streets.

Christchurch was increasingly industrialised in the early 20th century, particularly in the suburbs of Woolston and Addington, with Woolston housing a large amount of New Zealand's rubber industry. Many warehouses, factories and large premises of railway workshops were built along the Main South Line. There was notable development of breweries, flour mills, and light-commercial in Christchurch. This significantly increased the population of workers in the city, which soon spread industrialisation to Sydenham. As central Christchurch grew, many cottages were demolished to make way for light-industrial and retail premises near Moorhouse Avenue as they expanded south. Many churches were also built to compensate for its growing Christian population. The population of Christchurch exceeded 100,000 for the first time in 1919.

=== City growth, 1876–2010 ===
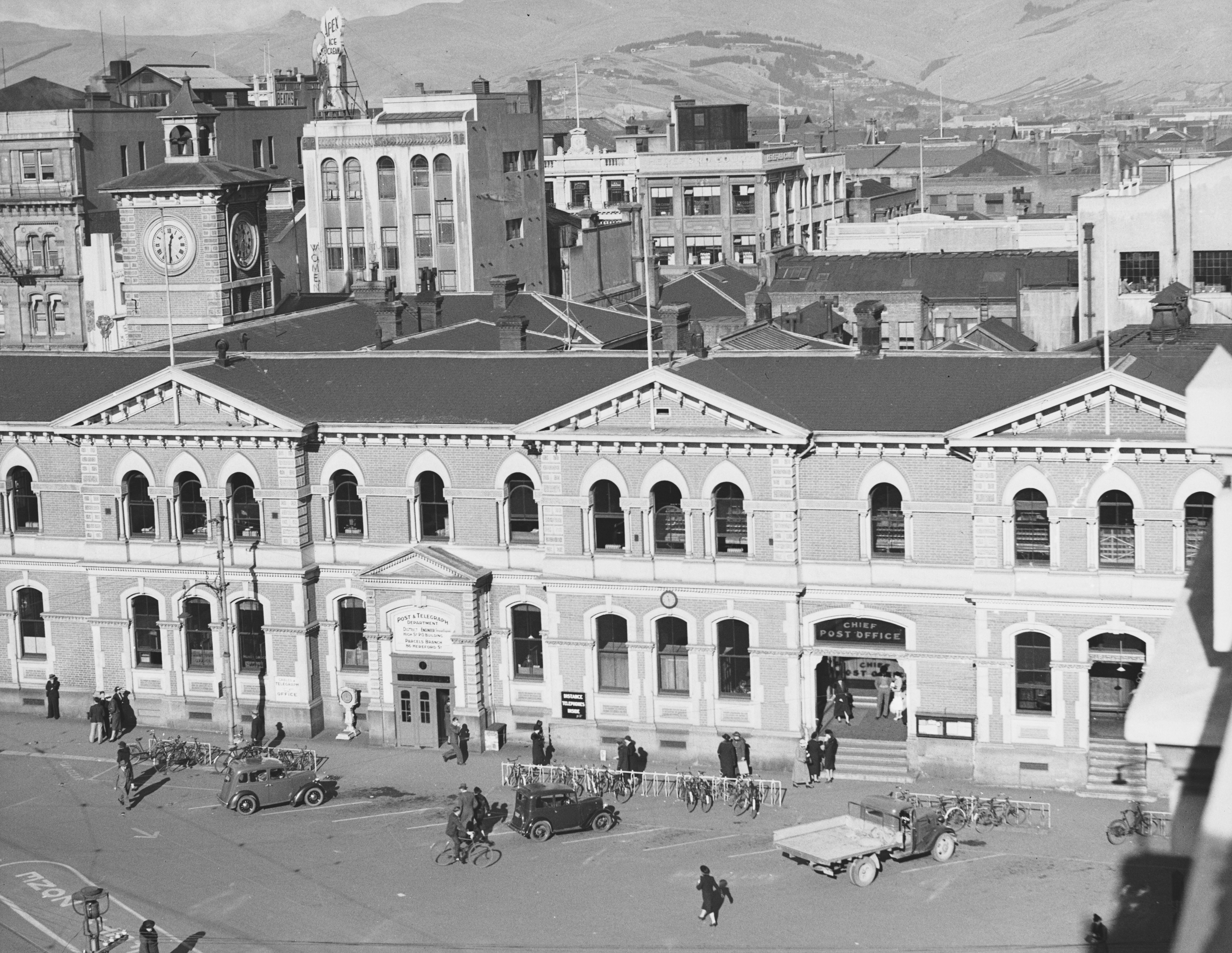
Post and Telegraph Department, Christchurch (1942)

Despite the central city remaining relatively unchanged between 1914 and 1960, Christchurch grew rapidly during the 20th century, in part due to the construction of many state houses. The earliest state houses were built in Sydenham in the 1900s, to house workers that were employed in nearby factories, with more houses built in 1909 near the Addington Railway Workshops. Part of this period of growth included the annexation of surrounding municipalities — in 1903 the boroughs of Linwood, St Albans, and Sydenham were annexed into Christchurch City. In 1921, two more boroughs were annexed: Spreydon and Woolston. In 1941, the New Brighton Borough was annexed and in 1945 the Sumner Borough was annexed. In 1953, an urban part of Heathcote County was incorporated into the city.

In November 1947, a basement fire at the Ballantynes department store on the corner of Cashel and Colombo Streets unexpectedly burned out of control, resulting in New Zealand's worst fire disaster. Despite being initially thought to be under control, the fire suddenly spread to the upper floors and consumed the entire building within minutes. The speed of the fire trapped 41 staff members on the upper floor, all of whom were killed. The department store was actually a combination of seven or eight different buildings, joined to form a "perplexing maze" with no sprinklers or alarm system. A subsequent Royal commission of enquiry resulted in changes to the building code to improve fire safety. Thousands of mourners, including the Prime Minister, attended a mass funeral in the aftermath.

During the 1960s Christchurch experienced urban sprawl, with much of the retail business of the central city moving out to urban shopping malls. These typically included large car parking areas to suit the growing shift towards personal car ownership, and away from public transport. Hornby became a significant industrial suburb in the 1960s, with industrial and residential premises expanding westwards. The Lyttelton road tunnel between Lyttelton and Christchurch was opened in 1964. Television broadcasts began in Christchurch on 1 June 1961 with the launch of channel CHTV3, making Christchurch the second New Zealand city to receive regular television broadcasts. The channel initially broadcast from a 10-kilowatt transmitter atop the Gloucester Street studios until it switched to the newly built 100-kilowatt Sugarloaf transmitter in the Port Hills on 28 August 1965. In 1969, the one-way system running through central Christchurch was established. The first two streets to be made one-way were Lichfield and St Asaph streets. They were followed by Barbadoes, Madras, Salisbury and Kilmore streets. A police station opened in 1973 on Hereford street, it was imploded and demolished in 2015.

Christchurch hosted the 1974 British Commonwealth Games at the purpose-built Queen Elizabeth II Park. The sports complex was open in 1973, one year before the games.

=== Earthquakes and beyond, 2010–present ===
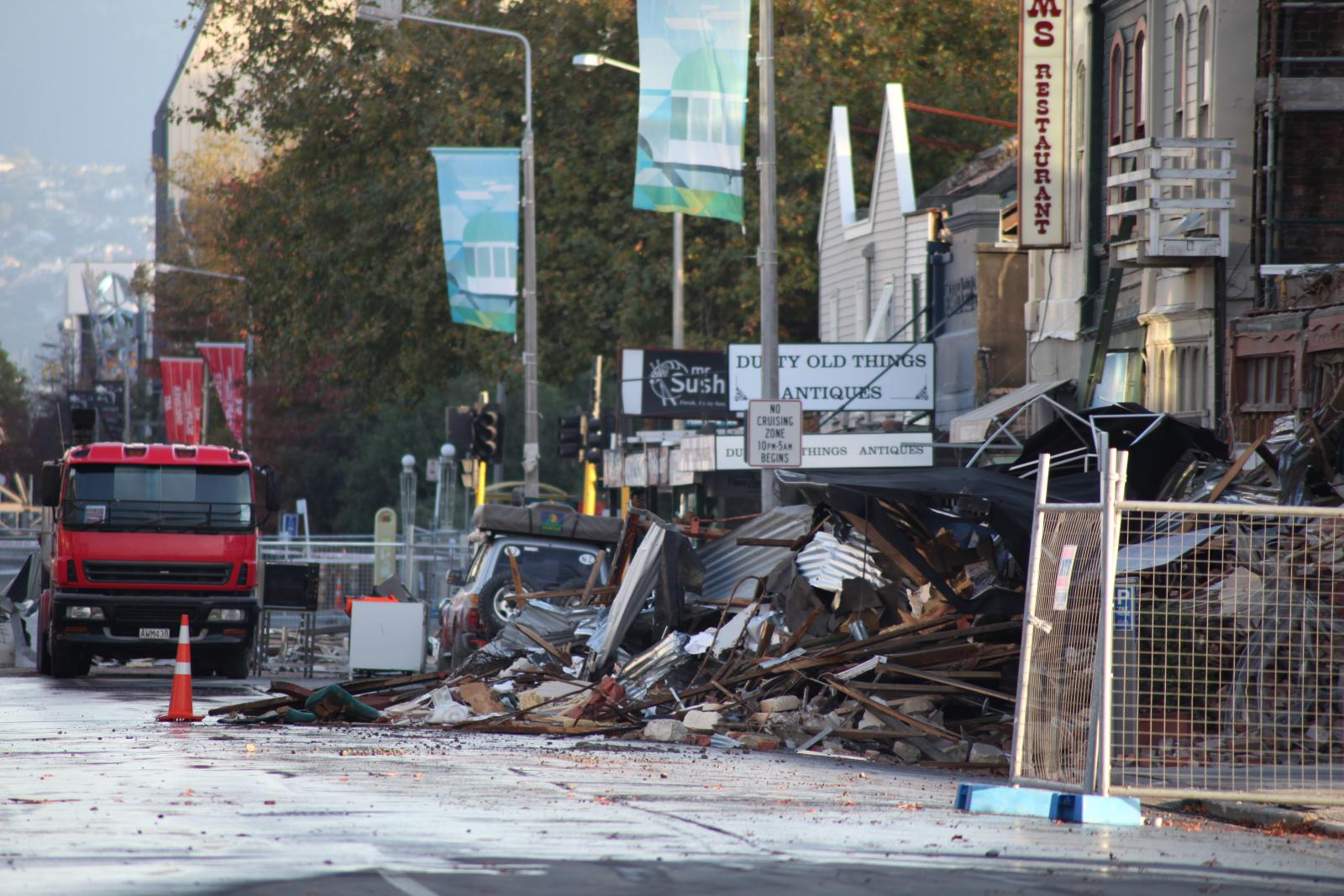
Aftermath of the February 2011 earthquake in the city centre on Colombo Street

On Saturday, 4 September 2010, a magnitude 7.1 earthquake struck Christchurch and the central Canterbury region at 4:35 am. With its hypocentre near Darfield, west of the city at a depth of 10 kilometres (6.2 mi), it caused widespread damage to the city and minor injuries, but no direct fatalities. This was followed by the Boxing Day earthquake a few months later, which occurred directly under the city centre and also caused widespread damage, but this was less severe.

On Tuesday, 22 February 2011, an earthquake measuring magnitude 6.3 struck the city at 12:51 pm. Its hypocentre was located closer to the city, near Lyttelton, at a depth of 5 km (3 mi). Although lower on the moment magnitude scale than the previous earthquake, the intensity and violence of the ground shaking was measured to be IX (Violent), among the strongest ever recorded globally in an urban area, which killed 185 people. On 13 June 2011 Christchurch was again rocked by two more large aftershocks. This resulted in more liquefaction and building damage, but no more lives were lost.

There were further earthquakes on 23 December 2011; the first, of magnitude 5.8, 26 km (16 mi) north-east of the city at a shallow depth at 1:58 pm, followed by several aftershocks and another earthquake of magnitude 5.9 and similar location 80 minutes later.

Many heritage buildings have been demolished since the earthquakes, and so have most of the city's high-rise buildings. Over 8,000 homes in the residential red zones—areas deemed infeasible to rebuild on due to land damage—were either demolished or relocated. Several churches have also been demolished. The temporary replacement of Christ Church Cathedral, known as Cardboard Cathedral, opened in August 2013. Repair work of Christ Church Cathedral has been on hold since 2024.

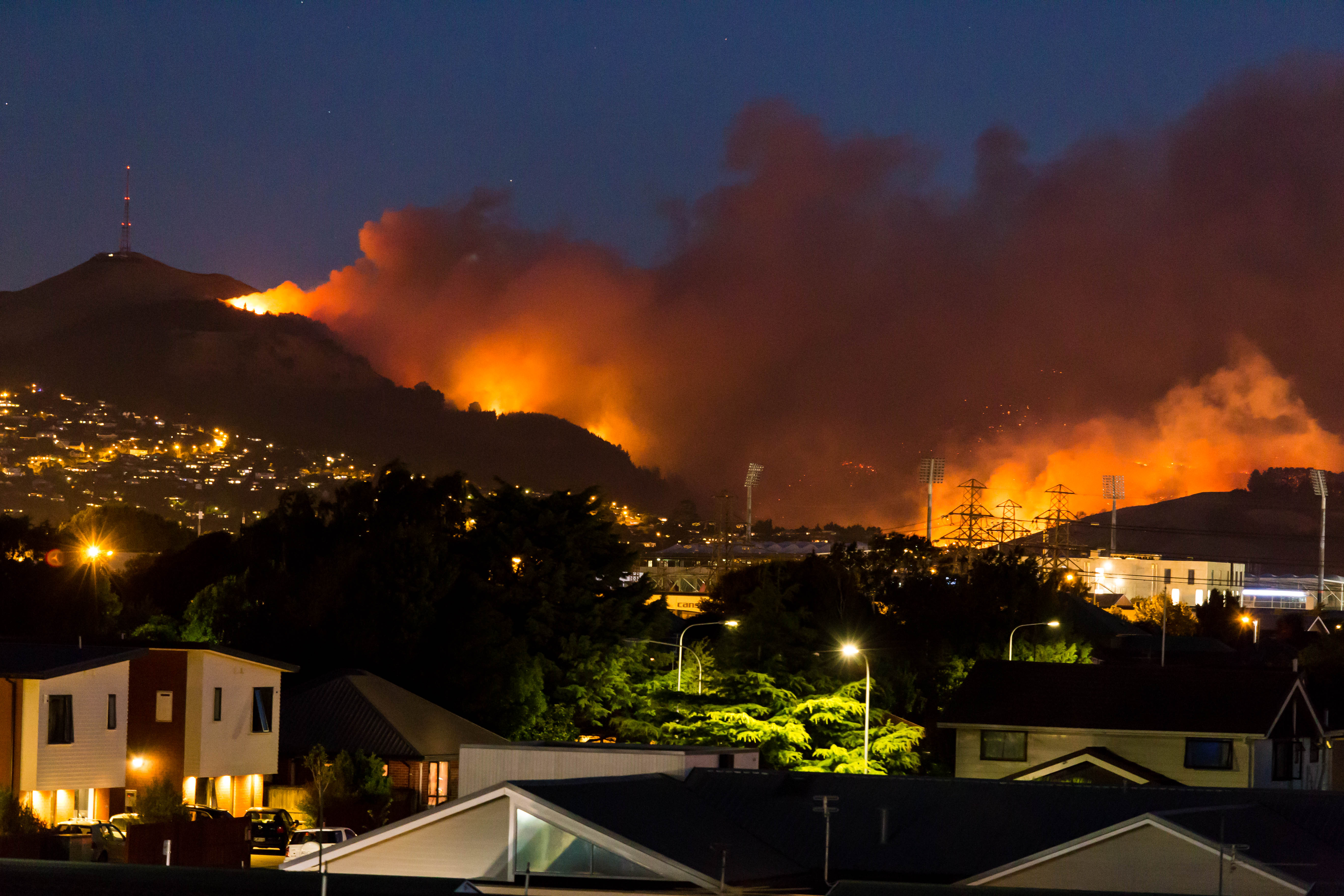
A view of the 2017 Port Hills fires, in Cashmere, on 15 February.

On 13 February 2017, two bush fires started on the Port Hills. These later merged and the single large wildfire extended down both sides of the Port Hill almost reaching Governors Bay in the south-west. Eleven houses were destroyed by fire and over 2,076 hectares (5,130 acres) of land was burned.

On 15 March 2019, fifty-one people were killed in a partially livestreamed mass shooting targeting two mosques. Just days after the attacks, the live-streamed footage became classified as objectionable by the Chief Censor, making the footage illegal to possess and distribute within New Zealand. On 2 June 2020, the attacker pleaded guilty to multiple charges of murder, attempted murder, and terrorism. On 27 August, he was sentenced to life in prison without the chance of parole, the first time such a sentence was handed down in New Zealand.

In 2024, a second fire on the Port Hills burned 700 hectares (1,700 acres). The fire was also started under similarly suspicious circumstances. Lessons from the 2017 fire contributed to a more effective emergency response.

== Geography ==
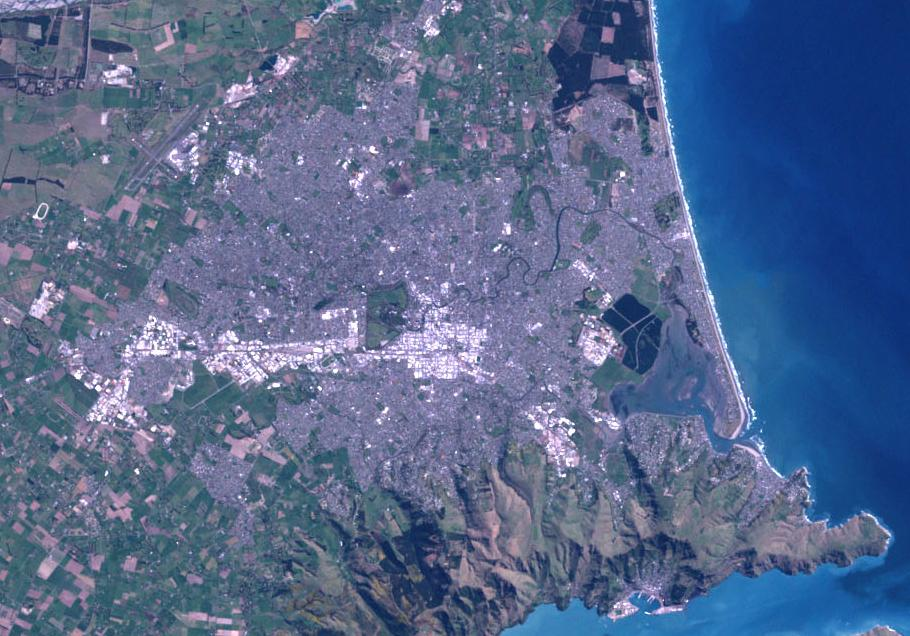
A satellite image showing Christchurch and surrounding areas

=== Location ===
Christchurch is halfway along the east coast of the South Island, facing the South Pacific Ocean. With the exception of the Port Hills on Banks Peninsula to its south, the city sits on flat land, on average about 20 m (66 ft) above sea level.

=== Geology ===
The present land mass of New Zealand split from the super continent of Gondwana about 85 million years ago. Prior to that time, mudstone and hardened sandstones commonly known as greywacke was deposited and deformed by tectonic movement. Following the split from Gondwana, during the period between 80 and 23 million years ago, the land became eroded and subsided below sea level. Marine and terrestrial sediments were deposited, leaving the greywacke as the oldest and deepest layers (basement rock). About 11–6 million years ago, volcanic eruptions created the Banks Peninsula volcanic complex. Over the last two million years as the Southern Alps were rising, there were multiple periods of glaciation. Rivers flowing from the mountains carried alluvial gravels over the area that is now the Canterbury Plains, covering the underlying rock to depths of between 200 and 600 metres. Continuing tectonic movement created faults that penetrate from the greywacke rock into the layers above. These faults remain beneath Canterbury and Christchurch.

The glacial/interglacial cycles of the Quaternary Period led to multiple rises and falls in sea level. These sea level changes occurred over a period when there was also slow subsidence in the eastern coastal plains of Canterbury and Christchurch. The result has been the deposition of sequences of mostly fluvial gravel (occurring during periods of low sea level and glaciation), and fine deposits of silt, sand and clay, with some peat, shells and wood (occurring during interglacial periods when the sea level was similar to the present).

=== Aquifer and spring-fed streams ===
The layers of gravel beneath the eastern Canterbury Plains and Christchurch area form an artesian aquifer with the interbedded fine sediments as an impermeable layer, or aquiclude. Water pressure from the artesian aquifer has led to the formation of numerous spring-fed streams. In Christchurch, the Avon River / Ōtākaro and Ōpāwaho / Heathcote River rivers have spring-fed sources in the western suburbs of Christchurch, and the Halswell River begins north-west of the Port Hills on the periphery of Christchurch and flows to Lake Ellesmere / Te Waihora.

As a consequence of the flat terrain and spring-fed streams, large parts of the area now occupied by Christchurch City were originally a coastal wetland, with extensive swamp forests. Much of the forest was destroyed by fire, mostly likely by the earliest inhabitants, from around 1000 AD. When European settlers arrived in the 19th century, the area was a mixture of swamp and tussock grasslands, with only remnant patches of forest. An early European visitor was William Barnard Rhodes, captain of the barque Australian, who climbed the Port Hills from Lyttelton Harbour in September 1836 and observed a large grassy plain with two small areas of forest. He reported that "All the land that I saw was swamp and mostly covered with water". Most of the eastern, southern and northern parts of the city were wet areas when European settlement began.

Over the period since European settlement commenced, land drainage works have enabled development of land across the city. There are now only small remnants of wetland remaining, such as Riccarton Bush, Travis Wetland, Ōtukaikino wetland, and the Cashmere Valley.

=== Central City ===
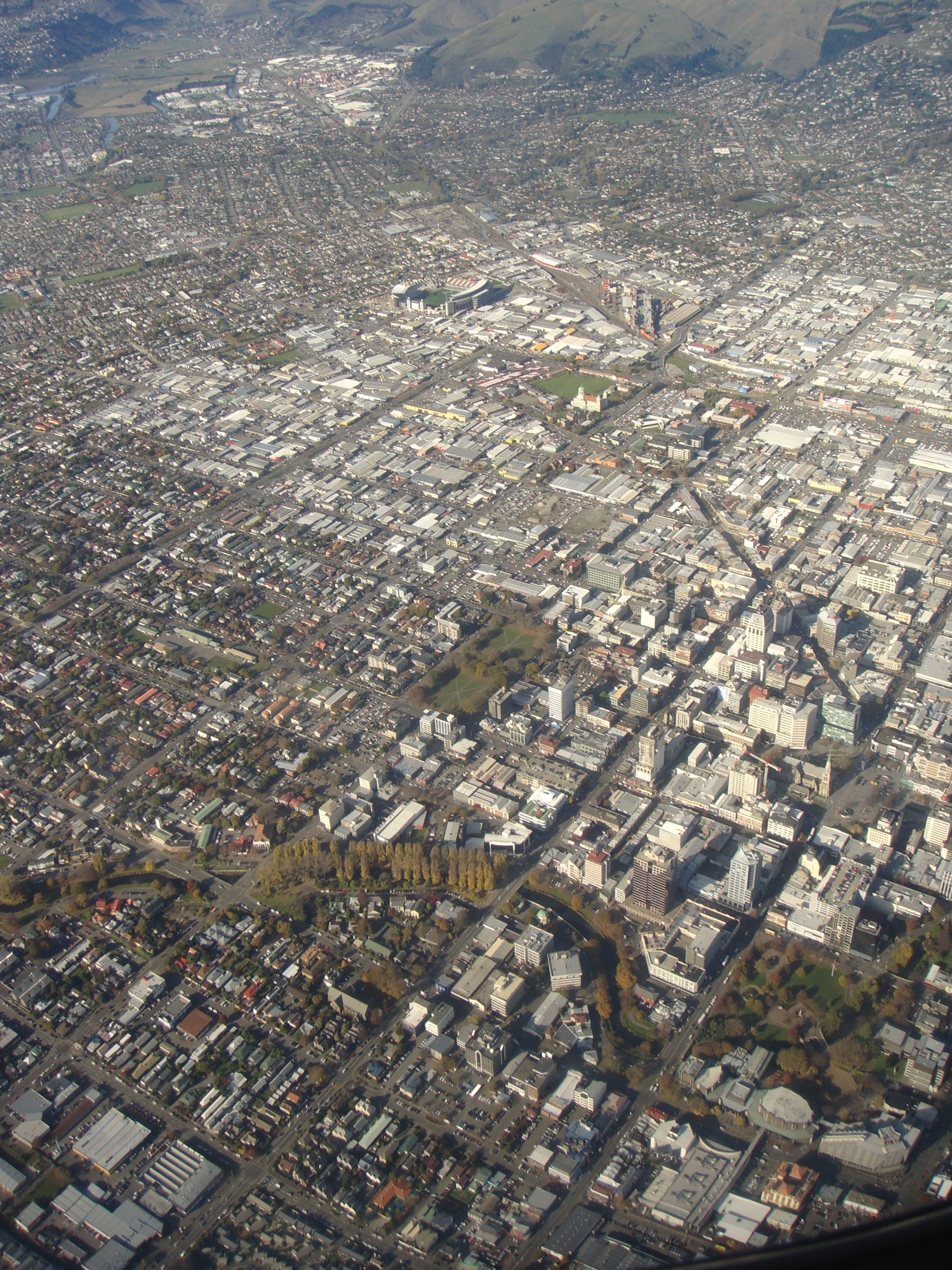
Aerial view of Christchurch Central City in 2009

Christchurch Central City is defined as the area centred on Cathedral Square and within the Four Avenues (Bealey Avenue, Fitzgerald Avenue, Moorhouse Avenue and Deans Avenue). It includes Hagley Park, and the Christchurch Botanic Gardens. The design of the central city with its grid pattern of streets, city squares and parkland was laid out by 1850.

The central city was among the most heavily damaged areas of Christchurch in the 2010 and 2011 earthquakes. Following the second earthquake, the Central City Red Zone was set up as an exclusion zone for public safety reasons, and many parts remained closed to the public until June 2013. A large number of heritage buildings were demolished following the earthquake, along with most of the city's high rise buildings. The Christchurch Central Recovery Plan was developed to lead the rebuild of the city centre, and featured 17 "anchor projects". There has been massive growth in the residential sector in the central city, particularly in the East Frame development.

=== Suburbs ===
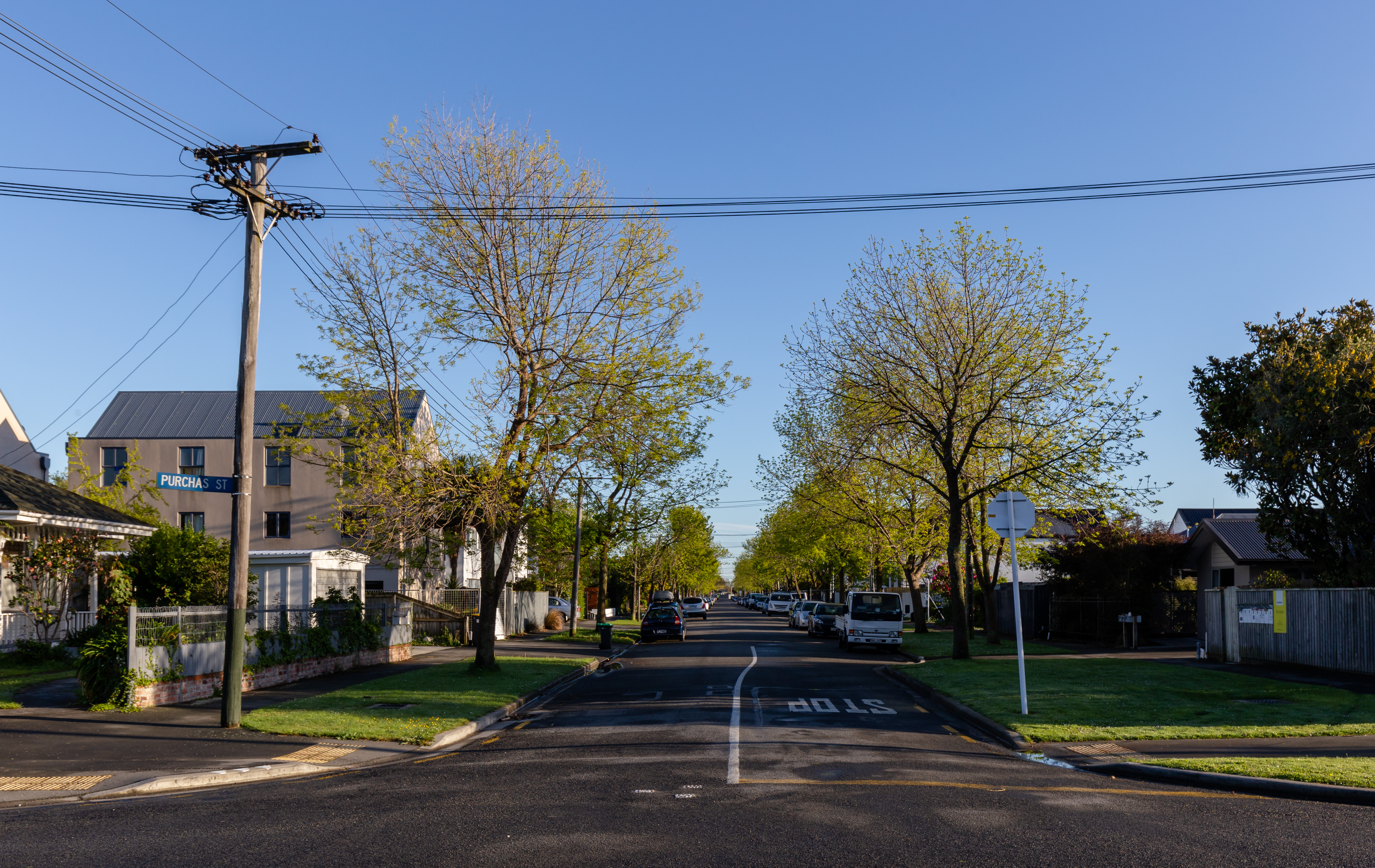
A typical residential street in a neighbourhood in Christchurch (photographed in St Albans)

There are no legal definition of the boundaries of suburbs in Christchurch. Statistics New Zealand and New Zealand Post maintain their own boundaries for their respective purposes. According to the city council, "A suburb is a reference to a general area of a city. The name of the suburb is usually derived from the name of a nearby school, post office or subdivision and is often used by businesses to divide the city into administrative areas."

The earliest suburbs of Christchurch were laid out with streets in a grid pattern, centred on Cathedral Square. Growth initially took place along the tramlines, leading to radial development. Major expansion occurred in the 1950s and 60s, with the development of large areas of state housing. Settlements that had originally been remote, such as Sumner, New Brighton, Upper Riccarton and Papanui eventually became amalgamated into the expanding city.

=== Satellite towns ===
The Christchurch functional urban area, as defined by Statistics New Zealand, covers 2,408.1 km^{2} (929.8 sq mi). Towns and settlements in the functional urban area include:

- Leeston
- Lyttelton
- Governors Bay
- Diamond Harbour
- Tai Tapu
- Little River
- Lincoln
- Prebbleton
- Rolleston
- Templeton
- West Melton
- Rangiora
- Woodend
- Waikuku
- Pegasus
- Kaiapoi
- Kainga
- The Pines Beach
- Motukarara

=== Climate ===
Christchurch has a temperate oceanic climate (Köppen: Cfb) with mild summers, cool winters, and moderate rainfall. It has mean daily maximum air temperatures of 22.6 °C (73 °F) in January and 10.9 °C (52 °F) in July. Summer in the city is mostly warm, but is often moderated by a sea breeze from the north-east. A notable feature of the weather is the nor'wester, a hot föhn wind that occasionally reaches storm force, causing widespread minor damage to property. Like many cities, Christchurch experiences an urban heat island effect; temperatures are slightly higher within the inner-city regions compared to the surrounding countryside. The highest temperature recorded in Christchurch was 41.6 °C (106.9 °F) on 7 February 1973, however the highest for the Christchurch metropolitan area was 42.4 °C (108 °F) recorded in Rangiora on the same day.

In winter, subzero temperatures are common, with nights falling below 0 °C (32 °F) an average of 50 times a year at Christchurch Airport and 23 times a year in the city centre. There are on average 80 days of ground frost per year. Snowfall occurs on average three times per year, although in some years none is recorded. Several snowstorms have hit Christchurch, including the "Big Snow" of August 1992 which brought up to 30 cm (12 in) of snow down to sea level in the city. The lowest temperature recorded in Christchurch was −9.4 °C (15 °F) in the suburb of Wigram in July 1945.

On cold winter nights, the surrounding hills, clear skies, and frosty calm conditions often combine to form a stable inversion layer above the city that traps vehicle exhausts and smoke from domestic fires to cause smog. While not as bad as smog in Los Angeles or Mexico City, Christchurch smog has often exceeded World Health Organisation recommendations for air pollution. To limit air pollution, the regional council banned the use of open fires in the city in 2006.

Climate data for Christchurch Airport (1991–2020 normals, extremes 1953–present)
Month	Jan	Feb	Mar	Apr	May	Jun	Jul	Aug	Sep	Oct	Nov	Dec	Year
Record high °C (°F)	37.1 (98.8)	40.0 (104.0)	35.9 (96.6)	29.9 (85.8)	27.3 (81.1)	25.1 (77.2)	22.4 (72.3)	22.8 (73.0)	26.2 (79.2)	30.1 (86.2)	32.0 (89.6)	36.0 (96.8)	40.0 (104.0)
Mean maximum °C (°F)	31.9 (89.4)	32.0 (89.6)	28.8 (83.8)	25.7 (78.3)	22.4 (72.3)	19.1 (66.4)	18.2 (64.8)	19.8 (67.6)	22.5 (72.5)	24.9 (76.8)	27.7 (81.9)	30.3 (86.5)	33.2 (91.8)
Mean daily maximum °C (°F)	22.5 (72.5)	22.2 (72.0)	20.3 (68.5)	17.2 (63.0)	14.7 (58.5)	11.7 (53.1)	11.2 (52.2)	12.5 (54.5)	14.8 (58.6)	16.9 (62.4)	18.8 (65.8)	21.1 (70.0)	17.0 (62.6)
Daily mean °C (°F)	17.1 (62.8)	16.9 (62.4)	14.9 (58.8)	11.9 (53.4)	9.3 (48.7)	6.4 (43.5)	6.0 (42.8)	7.3 (45.1)	9.3 (48.7)	11.3 (52.3)	13.2 (55.8)	15.7 (60.3)	11.6 (52.9)
Mean daily minimum °C (°F)	11.8 (53.2)	11.5 (52.7)	9.5 (49.1)	6.6 (43.9)	3.9 (39.0)	1.2 (34.2)	0.7 (33.3)	2.0 (35.6)	3.9 (39.0)	5.8 (42.4)	7.6 (45.7)	10.4 (50.7)	6.2 (43.2)
Mean minimum °C (°F)	5.4 (41.7)	4.6 (40.3)	2.5 (36.5)	−0.5 (31.1)	−2.4 (27.7)	−4.4 (24.1)	−4.7 (23.5)	−3.8 (25.2)	−2.6 (27.3)	−1.1 (30.0)	0.3 (32.5)	3.8 (38.8)	−5.2 (22.6)
Record low °C (°F)	3.0 (37.4)	1.5 (34.7)	−1.3 (29.7)	−4.0 (24.8)	−6.4 (20.5)	−7.2 (19.0)	−6.8 (19.8)	−6.7 (19.9)	−4.8 (23.4)	−4.2 (24.4)	−2.7 (27.1)	0.1 (32.2)	−7.2 (19.0)
Average rainfall mm (inches)	42.4 (1.67)	39.8 (1.57)	45.1 (1.78)	57.5 (2.26)	58.1 (2.29)	68.3 (2.69)	64.2 (2.53)	58.1 (2.29)	42.2 (1.66)	49.1 (1.93)	45.1 (1.78)	47.8 (1.88)	617.7 (24.33)
Average rainy days (≥ 1.0 mm)	6.0	5.3	5.7	7.7	7.1	8.6	7.7	7.3	6.2	7.2	7.0	7.0	82.8
Average relative humidity (%)	74.0	79.8	83.0	84.0	86.6	87.2	87.6	85.1	77.7	77.0	70.7	71.8	80.4
Mean monthly sunshine hours	227.5	195.2	190.6	158.1	141.2	115.3	127.8	156.5	169.1	205.4	226.7	215.0	2,128.4
Percentage possible sunshine	51	49	50	50	47	44	44	48	48	50	51	46	48
Average ultraviolet index	10	8	6	3	1	1	1	2	3	5	8	10	5
Source 1: NIWA Climate Data
Source 2: Time and Date (potential monthly daylight hours)

Climate data for Christchurch gardens (1991–2020 normals, extremes 1863–present)
Month	Jan	Feb	Mar	Apr	May	Jun	Jul	Aug	Sep	Oct	Nov	Dec	Year
Record high °C (°F)	36.6 (97.9)	41.6 (106.9)	34.4 (93.9)	30.3 (86.5)	28.0 (82.4)	23.1 (73.6)	22.9 (73.2)	23.8 (74.8)	27.3 (81.1)	31.4 (88.5)	32.9 (91.2)	35.4 (95.7)	41.6 (106.9)
Mean maximum °C (°F)	31.3 (88.3)	31.4 (88.5)	28.6 (83.5)	25.8 (78.4)	22.7 (72.9)	19.1 (66.4)	18.3 (64.9)	20.4 (68.7)	23.1 (73.6)	25.5 (77.9)	27.7 (81.9)	29.9 (85.8)	32.7 (90.9)
Mean daily maximum °C (°F)	22.6 (72.7)	22.4 (72.3)	20.5 (68.9)	17.6 (63.7)	15.0 (59.0)	12.0 (53.6)	11.6 (52.9)	13.0 (55.4)	15.3 (59.5)	17.3 (63.1)	19.2 (66.6)	21.2 (70.2)	17.3 (63.2)
Daily mean °C (°F)	17.5 (63.5)	17.3 (63.1)	15.5 (59.9)	12.7 (54.9)	10.1 (50.2)	7.3 (45.1)	6.8 (44.2)	8.1 (46.6)	10.3 (50.5)	12.2 (54.0)	14.0 (57.2)	16.2 (61.2)	12.3 (54.2)
Mean daily minimum °C (°F)	12.4 (54.3)	12.3 (54.1)	10.5 (50.9)	7.8 (46.0)	5.3 (41.5)	2.5 (36.5)	2.1 (35.8)	3.3 (37.9)	5.3 (41.5)	7.1 (44.8)	8.8 (47.8)	11.1 (52.0)	7.4 (45.3)
Mean minimum °C (°F)	6.6 (43.9)	6.4 (43.5)	4.2 (39.6)	1.9 (35.4)	−0.4 (31.3)	−2.4 (27.7)	−2.6 (27.3)	−1.9 (28.6)	−0.5 (31.1)	1.4 (34.5)	2.7 (36.9)	5.2 (41.4)	−3.4 (25.9)
Record low °C (°F)	1.1 (34.0)	1.2 (34.2)	−0.9 (30.4)	−3.6 (25.5)	−6.1 (21.0)	−5.8 (21.6)	−7.1 (19.2)	−5.4 (22.3)	−4.8 (23.4)	−3.3 (26.1)	−2.3 (27.9)	0.6 (33.1)	−7.1 (19.2)
Average rainfall mm (inches)	45.2 (1.78)	39.0 (1.54)	48.4 (1.91)	62.1 (2.44)	63.4 (2.50)	72.8 (2.87)	63.9 (2.52)	60.9 (2.40)	42.6 (1.68)	49.5 (1.95)	44.5 (1.75)	51.6 (2.03)	643.9 (25.37)
Source: NIWA

Christchurch is vulnerable to the effects of climate change, especially sea-level rise and wildfire. The city's low-lying coastal areas are particularly at risk of flooding. Sea levels around Christchurch rose by approximately 15 centimetres from the mid-1990s to 2026. Further rises of 14 to 23 centimetres are expected by 2050. Rising sea levels may increase coastal flooding, erosion and groundwater levels, making it more difficult for rainwater to drain away. Land subsidence in some areas, related to the Canterbury earthquakes, increases the risk. The Port Hills area is particularly vulnerable to wildfires.

== Demographics ==
Christchurch City covers a land area of 1,415.15 km^{2} (546.39 sq mi) and had an estimated population of 419,200 as of June 2025, with a population density of 296 people per km^{2}.

This is the second-most populous area administered by a single council in New Zealand, and the largest city in the South Island. The population comprises 407,800 people in the Christchurch urban area, 3,220 people in the Lyttelton urban area, 1,610 people in the Diamond Harbour urban area, and 6,570 people in rural settlements and areas.

Historical population for the territorial authority
Year	Pop.	±% p.a.
1981	281,721	—
1986	288,948	+0.51%
1991	296,061	+0.49%
1996	316,611	+1.35%
2001	323,956	+0.46%
2006	348,456	+1.47%
2013	341,469	−0.29%
2018	369,006	+1.56%
2023	391,383	+1.18%

Christchurch City had a population of 391,383 in the 2023 New Zealand census, an increase of 22,377 people (6.1%) since the 2018 census, and an increase of 49,914 people (14.6%) since the 2013 census. There were 192,684 males, 196,557 females and 2,139 people of other genders in 150,909 dwellings. 4.5% of people identified as LGBTIQ+. The median age was 37.5 years (compared with 38.1 years nationally). There were 64,722 people (16.5%) aged under 15 years, 84,633 (21.6%) aged 15 to 29, 178,113 (45.5%) aged 30 to 64, and 63,912 (16.3%) aged 65 or older.

Of those at least 15 years old, 70,764 (21.7%) people had a bachelor's or higher degree, 160,440 (49.1%) had a post-high school certificate or diploma, and 73,659 (22.5%) people exclusively held high school qualifications. The median income was $40,400, compared with $41,500 nationally. 35,010 people (10.7%) earned over $100,000 compared to 12.1% nationally. The employment status of those at least 15 was that 163,554 (50.1%) people were employed full-time, 47,463 (14.5%) were part-time, and 8,913 (2.7%) were unemployed.

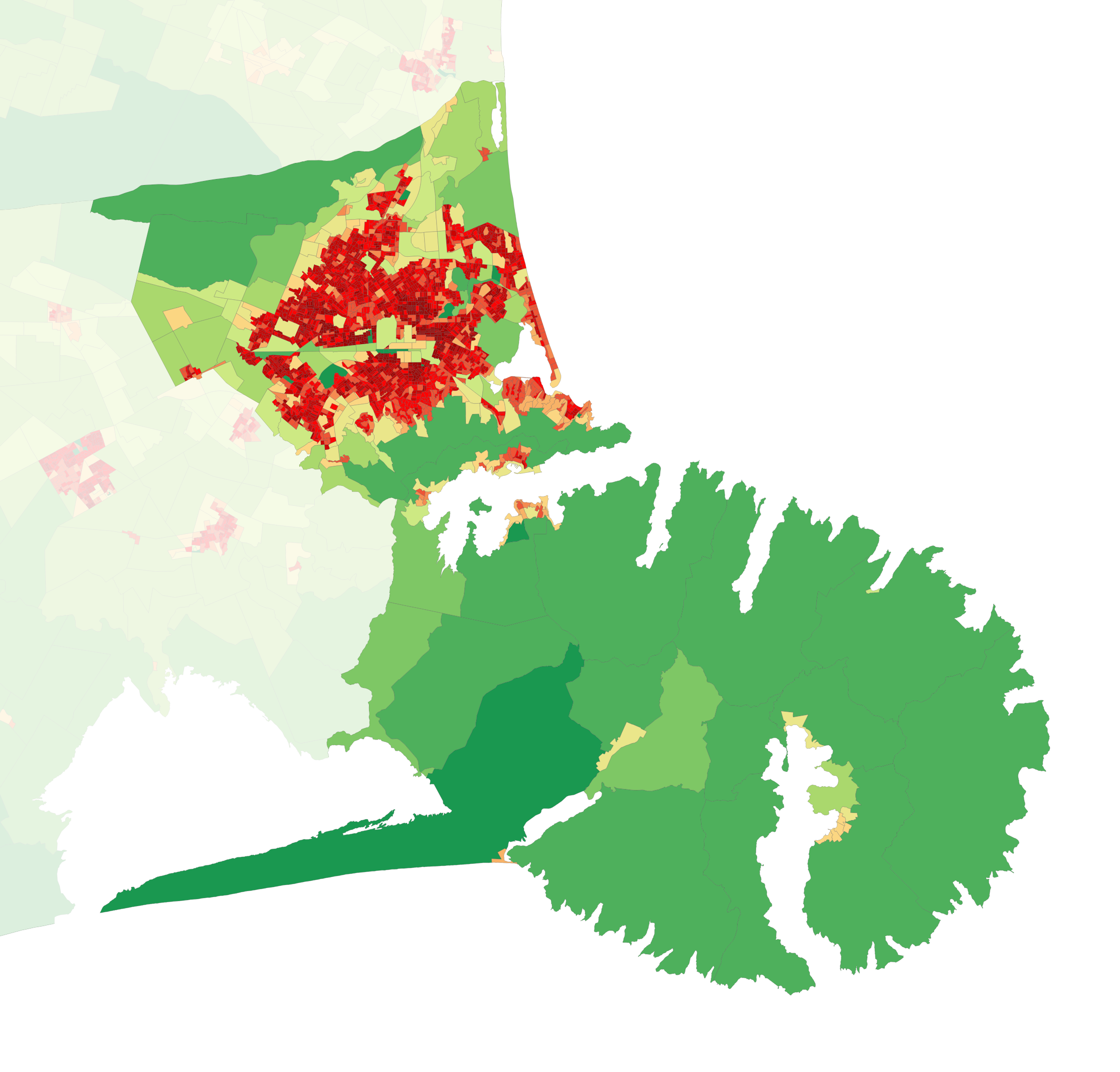
Population density in the 2023 census

Individual wards
Name	Area (km^{2})	Population	Density (per km^{2})	Dwellings	Median age	Median income
Harewood	122.80	25,470	207	9,921	42.4 years	$41,800
Waimairi	10.44	23,997	2,299	8,559	37.8 years	$36,600
Papanui	11.86	25,137	2,119	9,810	38.6 years	$40,600
Fendalton	9.97	25,122	2,520	9,396	40.9 years	$43,400
Innes	12.87	25,035	1,945	10,575	35.3 years	$43,300
Burwood	18.70	25,245	1,350	9,369	38.0 years	$39,600
Coastal	52.14	25,857	496	10,074	40.0 years	$40,600
Hornby	48.75	26,478	543	9,351	35.8 years	$41,200
Halswell	40.30	28,590	709	10,044	37.2 years	$47,900
Riccarton	8.75	25,593	2,925	7,965	27.0 years	$24,700
Spreydon	11.75	25,773	2,193	10,080	35.4 years	$41,500
Central	11.55	24,192	2,095	11,178	33.3 years	$42,200
Cashmere	30.15	26,373	875	10,206	42.8 years	$49,400
Linwood	16.74	23,577	1,408	9,360	36.7 years	$35,500
Heathcote	35.16	25,749	732	10,923	41.9 years	$44,600
Banks Peninsula	973.22	9,195	9	4,098	50.9 years	$40,300
New Zealand					38.1 years	$41,500

=== Culture and identity ===
People could identify as more than one ethnicity in the census. The results were 75.9% European (Pākehā); 11.2% Māori; 4.3% Pasifika; 17.1% Asian; 1.9% Middle Eastern, Latin American and African New Zealanders (MELAA); and 2.2% other, which includes people giving their ethnicity as "New Zealander". English was spoken by 95.8%, Māori language by 2.4%, Samoan by 1.3% and other languages by 16.8%. No language could be spoken by 2.1% (e.g. too young to talk). New Zealand Sign Language was known by 0.6%. The percentage of people born overseas was 27.8, compared with 28.8% nationally.

Religious affiliations were 31.6% Christian, 2.1% Hindu, 1.3% Islam, 0.4% Māori religious beliefs, 1.0% Buddhist, 0.5% New Age, 0.1% Jewish, and 2.0% other religions. People who answered that they had no religion were 54.9%, and 6.3% of people did not answer the census question.

At the 2018 census, Europeans formed the majority in all sixteen wards, ranging from 57.7% in the Riccarton ward to 93.1% in the Banks Peninsula ward. The highest concentrations of Māori and Pasifika people were in the Linwood ward (18.3% and 9.0% respectively), followed by the Burwood ward (15.5% and 6.6%), while the highest concentrations of Asian people were in the Riccarton ward (34.9%) and Waimairi ward (26.7%).

=== Urban area ===
Christchurch urban area covers 294.43 km^{2} (113.68 sq mi) and had an estimated population of 407,800 as of June 2025, with a population density of 1,385 people per km^{2}.

Historical population for the urban area
Year	Pop.	±% p.a.
2013	330,645	—
2018	358,068	+1.61%
2023	380,079	+1.20%

The urban area had a population of 380,079 in the 2023 New Zealand census, an increase of 22,011 people (6.1%) since the 2018 census, and an increase of 49,434 people (15.0%) since the 2013 census. There were 187,086 males, 190,911 females and 2,082 people of other genders in 146,055 dwellings. 4.5% of people identified as LGBTIQ+. The median age was 37.1 years (compared with 38.1 years nationally). There were 63,138 people (16.6%) aged under 15 years, 83,217 (21.9%) aged 15 to 29, 172,314 (45.3%) aged 30 to 64, and 61,413 (16.2%) aged 65 or older.

People could identify as more than one ethnicity. The results were 75.4% European (Pākehā); 11.3% Māori; 4.4% Pasifika; 17.5% Asian; 1.9% Middle Eastern, Latin American and African New Zealanders (MELAA); and 2.2% other, which includes people giving their ethnicity as "New Zealander". English was spoken by 95.7%, Māori language by 2.4%, Samoan by 1.3% and other languages by 17.0%. No language could be spoken by 2.1% (e.g. too young to talk). New Zealand Sign Language was known by 0.6%. The percentage of people born overseas was 27.9, compared with 28.8% nationally.

Religious affiliations were 31.8% Christian, 2.2% Hindu, 1.3% Islam, 0.4% Māori religious beliefs, 1.0% Buddhist, 0.5% New Age, 0.1% Jewish, and 2.0% other religions. People who answered that they had no religion were 54.6%, and 6.3% of people did not answer the census question.

Of those at least 15 years old, 68,472 (21.6%) people had a bachelor's or higher degree, 155,583 (49.1%) had a post-high school certificate or diploma, and 71,943 (22.7%) people exclusively held high school qualifications. The median income was $40,400, compared with $41,500 nationally. 33,714 people (10.6%) earned over $100,000 compared to 12.1% nationally. The employment status of those at least 15 was that 158,859 (50.1%) people were employed full-time, 45,678 (14.4%) were part-time, and 8,727 (2.8%) were unemployed.

== Economy ==
=== Economic profile in 2023 ===
In 2023, the gross domestic product (GDP) of Christchurch City was $31.5 billion, representing 8.4% of New Zealand's total GDP. The sector with the largest contribution to the Christchurch City GDP was professional, scientific and technical services, at 12%. This is higher than the 9.6% contribution that these services make to the national economy. The next highest contribution to the city GDP was from healthcare and social assistance at 8.8%, versus 6.5% in the national economy. Manufacturing contributed 8.1%, compared with 8.2% in the national economy.

Christchurch City provides a diverse range of services for the Canterbury Region, but there are significant differences in the ranking of the sectors with the greatest contribution to GDP, when comparing the city GDP with the Canterbury Region GDP. Manufacturing and construction are the top two ranked sectors for the Canterbury region, but these two sectors are ranked third and fourth for the contribution to the city GDP. Conversely, professional, scientific and technical services are top ranked for the city, but third in the Canterbury Region GDP. Healthcare and social assistance is ranked second in the city GDP, but only seventh in the Canterbury Region GDP. Agriculture remains a significant contributor to the Canterbury Region GDP (sixth placed at $3.3 billion).

The four largest industries in the city, based on the percentage of filled jobs were healthcare and social assistance, professional scientific and technical services, construction, and retail trade. Christchurch City had a higher proportion of people in employed in healthcare and social assistance (12.9%) than the national average (10.3%), but the proportions employed in professional, scientific and technical services, construction and retail trade were close to the national averages.

A number of nationally and internationally recognised brands and companies were founded and have their headquarters in Christchurch including Macpac, Kathmandu, PGG Wrightson, Tait Communications, Cookie Time, Hamilton Jet, ANZCO Foods and Smiths City.

=== Industry ===
Christchurch is the second-largest manufacturing centre in New Zealand behind Auckland, the sector being the second-largest contributor to the local economy, with firms such as Anderson's making steel work for bridges, tunnels, and hydroelectric dams in the early days of infrastructure work. Now manufacturing is mainly of light products and the key market is Australia, with firms such as those pioneered by the Stewart family among the larger employers. Before clothing manufacture largely moved to Asia, Christchurch was the centre of the New Zealand clothing industry, with firms such as LWR Industries. The firms that remain mostly design and market, and manufacture in Asia. The city also had five footwear manufacturers, but these have been replaced by imports.

In the last few decades, technology-based industries have sprung up in Christchurch. Angus Tait founded Tait Electronics, a mobile-radio manufacturer, and other firms spun off from this, such as Dennis Chapman's Swichtec. In software, Cantabrian Gil Simpson founded a company that made LINC and Jade programming languages, and a management buyout spawned local firm Wynyard Group.

There have also been spin-offs from the electrical department of the University of Canterbury engineering school. These included Pulse Data, which became Human Ware (making reading devices and computers for blind people and those with limited vision) and CES Communications (encryption). The Pulse Data founders had moved from the Canterbury University engineering school to work for Wormald Inc. when they set up Pulse Data through a Management buyout of their division. Spin-off company Invert Robotics developed the world's first climbing robot capable of climbing on stainless steel, aimed at the dairy tank inspection market.

In recent times, the University of Canterbury engineering school and computer science department play an important role in supplying staff and research for the technology industries, and the Christchurch Polytechnic Institute of Technology provides a flow of trained technicians and engineers. Locally and nationally, the IT sector is known not for its size (the third largest in New Zealand) but for producing innovative and entrepreneurial solutions, products and concepts.

=== Services for agriculture ===
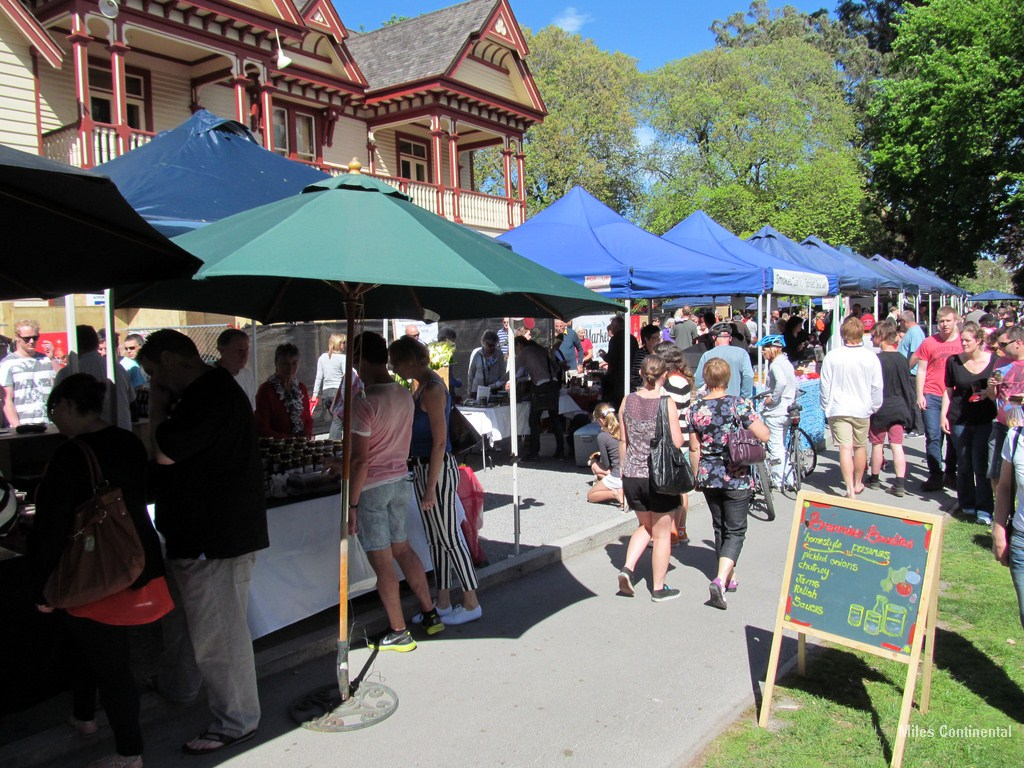
Christchurch farmers' market, Riccarton, beside Riccarton House

The agricultural industry was originally the economic core of Christchurch. Its surrounding farming countryside was originally the basis of its industry, part of the original "package" sold to New Zealand immigrants. PGG Wrightson, New Zealand's leading agribusiness, is based in Christchurch. Its local roots go back to Pyne Gould Guinness, an old stock and station agency serving the South Island.

Other agribusinesses in Christchurch have included malting, seed development and dressing, wool and meat processing, and small biotechnology operations using by-products from meat works. Dairying has grown strongly in the surrounding areas, with high world prices for milk products and the use of irrigation to lift grass growth on dry land. With its higher labour use, this has helped stop declines in rural population. Many cropping and sheep farms have been converted to dairying. Conversions have been by agribusiness companies as well as by farmers, many of whom have moved south from North Island dairying strongholds such as Taranaki and the Waikato.

Cropping has always been important in the Canterbury Region. Wheat and barley and various strains of clover and other grasses for seed exporting have been the main crops. These have all created processing businesses in Christchurch. Agriculture in the region has diversified, with a wine industry developing at Waipara, and the beginnings of new horticulture industries such as olive production and processing. Deer farming has led to new processing using antlers for Asian medicine and aphrodisiacs. The high-quality local wine in particular has increased the appeal of Canterbury and Christchurch to tourists.

An important component of the regions agricultural calendar is the Canterbury A&P Show. The first show took place in Christchurch on 22 October 1862 and is now the largest agricultural and pastoral show in New Zealand featuring a combination of agriculture presentations, trade stalls, competitions and entertainment over three days. The Friday of the A&P Show had since at least 1918 been the People's Day or Show Day, and sometime between 1955 and 1958, Christchurch City Council moved the anniversary day to coincide with Show Day, as this allowed banks and businesses to close and people to attend the A&P Show.

=== Tourism ===
Tourism is significant for the city's economy. As a city with a major international airport and the largest city in the South Island, Christchurch is a gateway for international tourists visiting the South Island attractions of Aoraki / Mount Cook National Park, Queenstown, the West Coast and Kaikōura. However, the city is also a destination in itself because of its gardens, its history and heritage, galleries and museums, the scenery of the Port Hills, and the stories of the impact and recovery from the 2011 earthquakes. The tourism sector contributed 3.7% of the GDP of Christchurch in 2023, a significant increase over the 2.1% contribution in 2000. Annual growth in the tourism GDP since 2000 has been an average of 5.9%, slightly below the national average growth rate of 6.9%. The largest category of tourism expenditure in 2023 was sales at $780 million (31.6% of total tourism spending). The next highest category was passenger transport, at $392.5 million (15.9% of total).

=== Gateway to the Antarctic ===
The city began its long history as an Antarctic gateway in 1901, when the Discovery Expedition left from Lyttelton. Robert Falcon Scott's second departure from Christchurch in 1910 would be his last; he died as part of the Terra Nova Expedition. The city mourned his death, and a memorial statue of him was unveiled in 1917.

Today the United States Navy, United States Air National Guard, Korean Polar Research Institute and the Italian National Antarctic Research Program, augmented by the New Zealand and Australian air forces, use Christchurch Airport as the take-off point for the main supply route to McMurdo and Scott Bases in Antarctica. The International Antarctic Centre adjacent to the airport, provides visitor experiences, education, and operational support for research teams.

The economic contribution of Antarctic-related activities includes the contribution of $229.3 million to the national economy in 2023 and the supporting of more than 3,000 full-time jobs in Canterbury spanning logistics, science, education, tourism, and advanced manufacturing. The Clothing Distribution Center in Christchurch had more than 140,000 pieces of extreme cold weather gear for issue to nearly 2,000 United States Antarctic Program participants in the 2007–08 season.

== Government ==
=== Local government ===
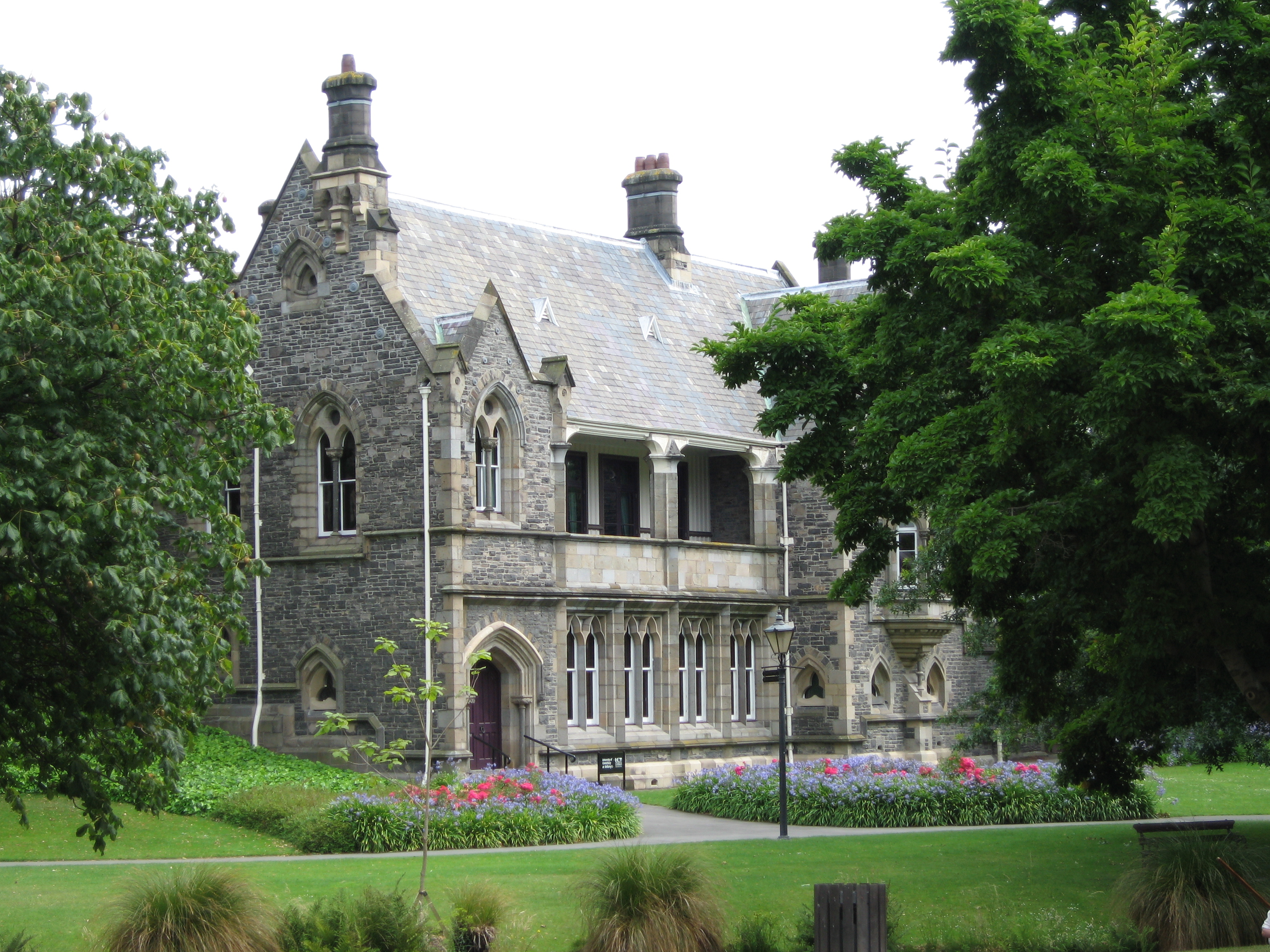
The Canterbury Provincial Council Building

Christchurch's local government is a democracy with various elements, including:

- Christchurch City Council, comprising the Mayor of Christchurch, and 16 councillors elected in 16 wards: Spreydon, Cashmere, Halswell, Riccarton, Hornby, Fendalton, Waimairi, Papanui, Innes, Central, Linwood, Heathcote, Harewood, Burwood, Coastal, and Banks Peninsula.
- Community boards, currently six, typically covering 3 wards with 2 members elected, and one councillor appointed from each (9 members): Waihoro Spreydon-Cashmere-Heathcote, Waipapa Papanui-Innes-Central, Waipuna Halswell-Hornby-Riccarton, Waimāero Fendalton-Waimairi-Harewood, Waitai Coastal-Burwood-Linwood; the exception to this rule being the one covering Te Pātaka o Rākaihautū Banks Peninsula where all members are elected from 4 subdivisions within the Banks Peninsula Ward (Akaroa, Mount Herbert, Lyttelton, Wairewa) alongside the Ward Councillor.
- District councils in surrounding areas: Selwyn, and Waimakariri. The Banks Peninsula district council was amalgamated into Christchurch City in March 2006 after a vote by the Banks Peninsula residents to disestablish in November 2005.
- Canterbury Regional Council, known as 'Environment Canterbury', including four Christchurch constituencies with two members from each constituency.
- Prior to the disestablishment of the district health board model during the 2022 local elections, elections were also held for the Canterbury District Health Board, with five members for Christchurch.

Some of the local governments in Canterbury and the NZ Transport Agency have created the Greater Christchurch Urban Development Strategy to facilitate future urban planning.

List of current Christchurch city councillors
Mayor	Banks Peninsula	Burwood	Cashmere	Central	Coastal	Fendalton	Halswell	Harewood	Heathcote	Hornby	Innes	Linwood	Papanui	Riccarton	Spreydon	Waimairi
Phil; Mauger (Ind.)	Tyrone; Fields (PC)	Kelly; Barber (Ind.)	Tim; Scandrett (Ind.)	Jake; McLellan (Labour)	Celeste; Donovan (Ind.)	David; Cartwright (IC)	Andrei; Moore (Ind.)	Aaron; Keown (Ind.)	Nathaniel; Herz Jardine (PC)	Mark; Peters (Ind.)	Pauline; Cotter (PC)	Yani; Johanson (PC – Labour)	Victoria; Henstock (Ind.)	Tyla; Harrison-Hunt (PC)	Melanie; Coker (PC – Labour)	Sam; MacDonald (IC)

=== Central government ===
Christchurch is covered by seven general electorates (Banks Peninsula, Christchurch Central, Christchurch East, Ilam, Selwyn, Waimakariri and Wigram) and one Māori electorate (Te Tai Tonga), each returning one member to the New Zealand House of Representatives. As of the 2023 New Zealand general election there are four general electorate members of the National party and three members of the Labour party. The Māori electorate is represented by Independent.

Members of Parliament
Banks Peninsula	Christchurch Central	Christchurch East	Ilam	Selwyn	Waimakariri	Wigram	Te Tai Tonga
						[[|70px]]	[[|70px]]
Tracey McLellan (Labour)	George Hampton (Labour)	Reuben Davidson (Labour)	Hamish Campbell (National)	Nicola Grigg (National)	Matt Doocey (National)	Dominik Yanzick (Labour)	Mananui Ramsden (Labour)

== Culture and entertainment ==
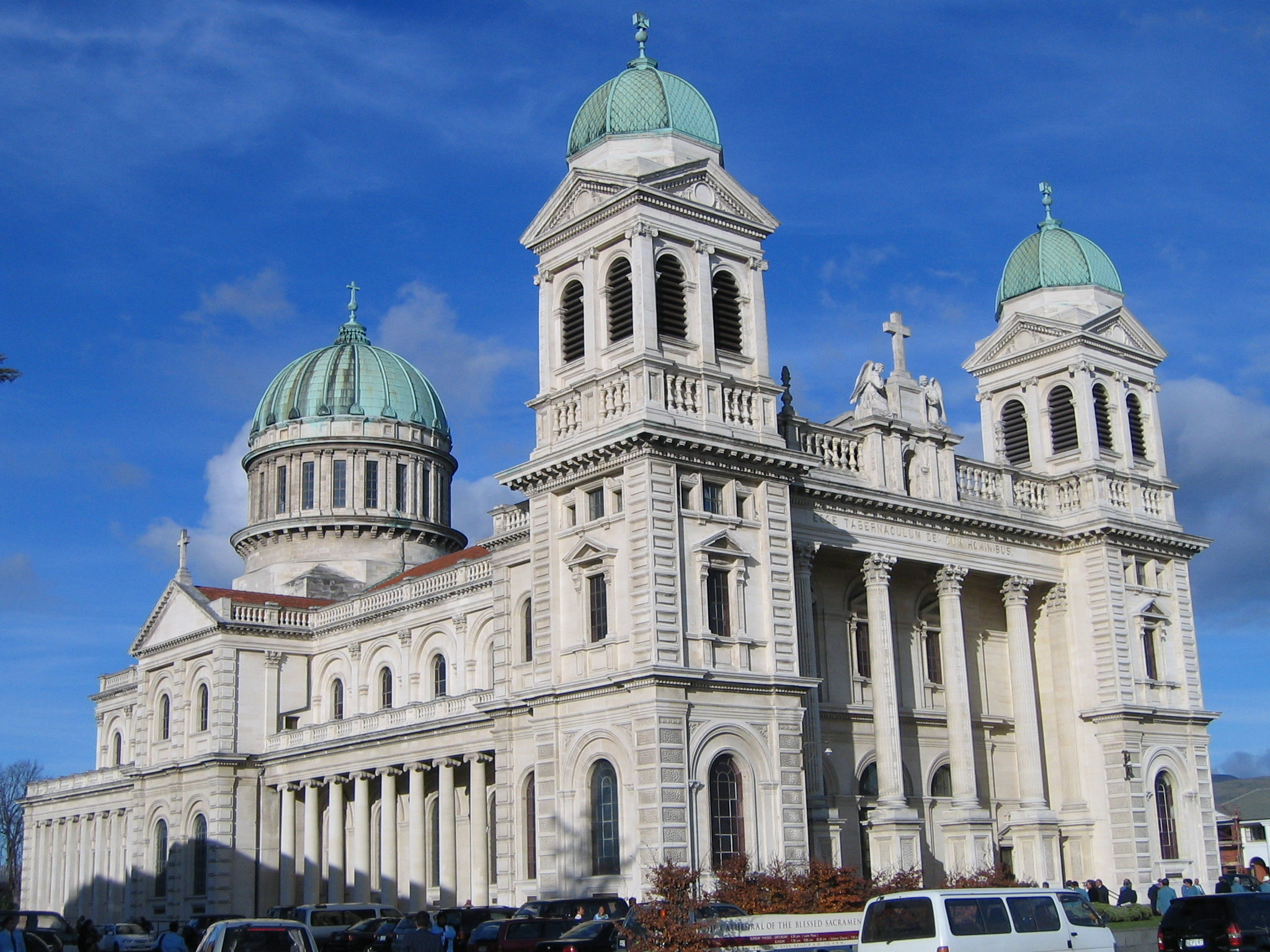
Cathedral of the Blessed Sacrament, damaged by the 2011 earthquake and subsequently demolished

=== Cinema ===
Historically, most cinemas were grouped around Cathedral Square.

One of the first generation of suburban cinemas still operating as a cinema, the Hollywood in Sumner, operated from 1938 until 2022; before closing to be refurbished and becoming part of the Silky Otter cinema chain which also runs a cinema in Wigram. The largest multiplexes were the Hoyts 8 in the old railway station on Moorhouse Avenue (now replaced by EntX) and Reading Cinemas (also eight screens) in the Palms Shopping Centre in Shirley. Hoyts in Riccarton opened in 2005 with one of its screens for a time holding the record for the largest in New Zealand.

The Rialto Cinemas on Moorhouse Avenue specialised in international films and art-house productions. The Rialto also hosted the majority of the city's various film festivals and was home to the local film society. The Rialto was closed following the 2011 Christchurch earthquake.

The Peter Jackson film Heavenly Creatures (1994), starring Melanie Lynskey and Kate Winslet, was set in Christchurch.

=== Parks and nature ===
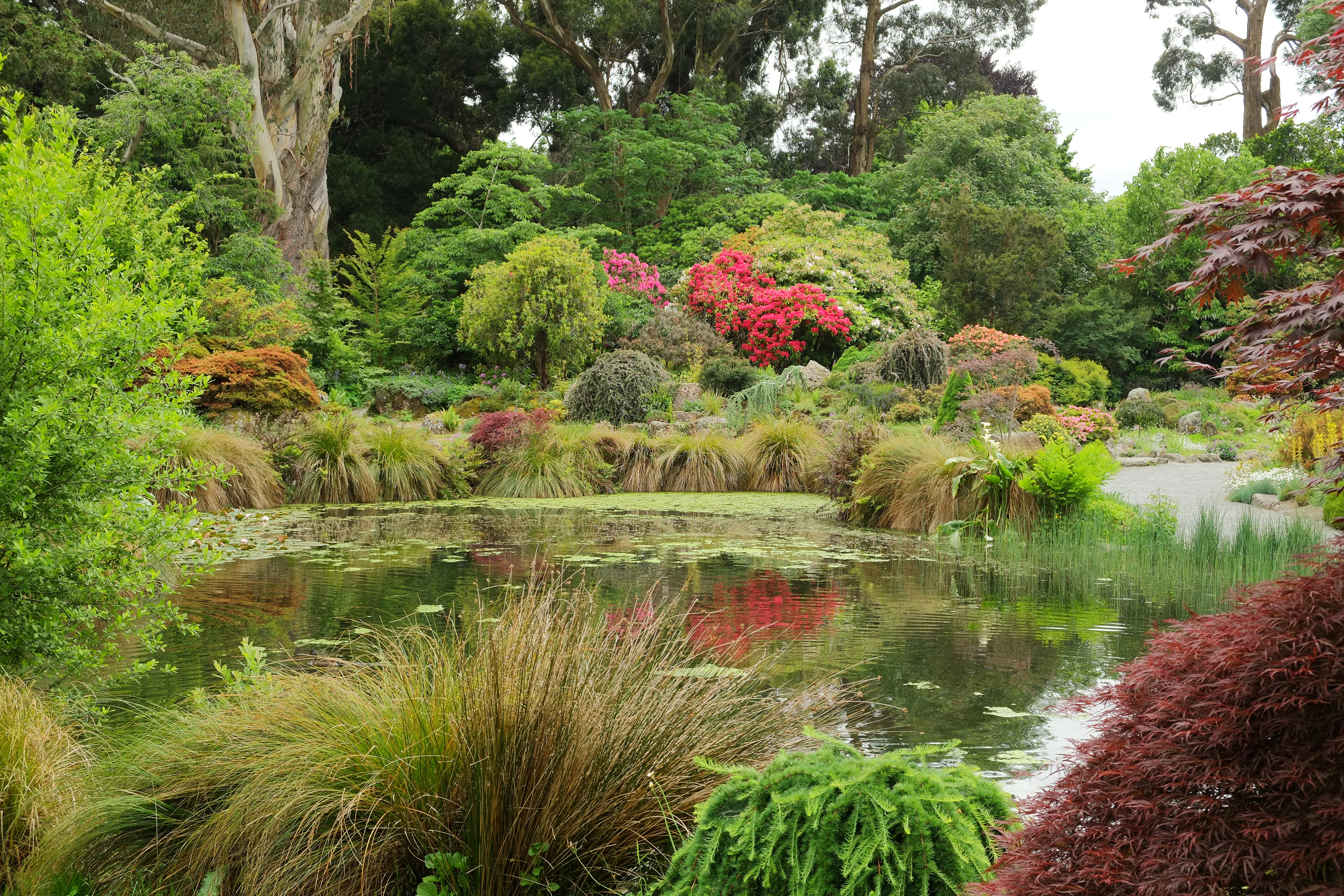
Christchurch Botanic Gardens

Christchurch has been described as The Garden City because of the large number of public parks and well-developed residential gardens with many trees. A British lawyer John Eldon Gorst, stated that Christchurch reminded him of the garden cities in England, and he called it as such. Hagley Park and the 33-hectare (82-acre) Christchurch Botanic Gardens, founded in 1863, are in the central city, which is an active habitat for kererū. The Hagley Oval is a popular cricket field. Other sports such as association football, and rugby are popular in Hagley Park, and open-air concerts by local bands and orchestras, and firework displays. North Hagley Park is known for its cherry blossoms, planted along Harper Avenue on Arbor Day in 1936. During the flowering season the trees are popular with visitors.

To the east lies Rāwhiti Domain, in New Brighton, and to the north lies Spencer Park. And there are many inner city urban parks such as, Latimer Square, Cranmer Square, and Victoria Square. To the north of the city is the Willowbank Wildlife Reserve. Travis Wetland, an ecological restoration programme to create a wetland, many native plants and birdlife thrive there, notably royal spoonbills and spotless crake and recent plantings of fork-leaved sundew. It is located to the east of the city centre near the suburb of Burwood and North New Brighton. There has been recent work to restore Papanui Bush, it began in 2018, with recent plantings of native wildlife such as rimu and tōtara to restore this area like it was pre-European urbanisation.

Orana Wildlife Park is New Zealand's only open-range zoo, sitting on 80 hectares of land, located on the outskirts of Christchurch.

=== Theatre ===
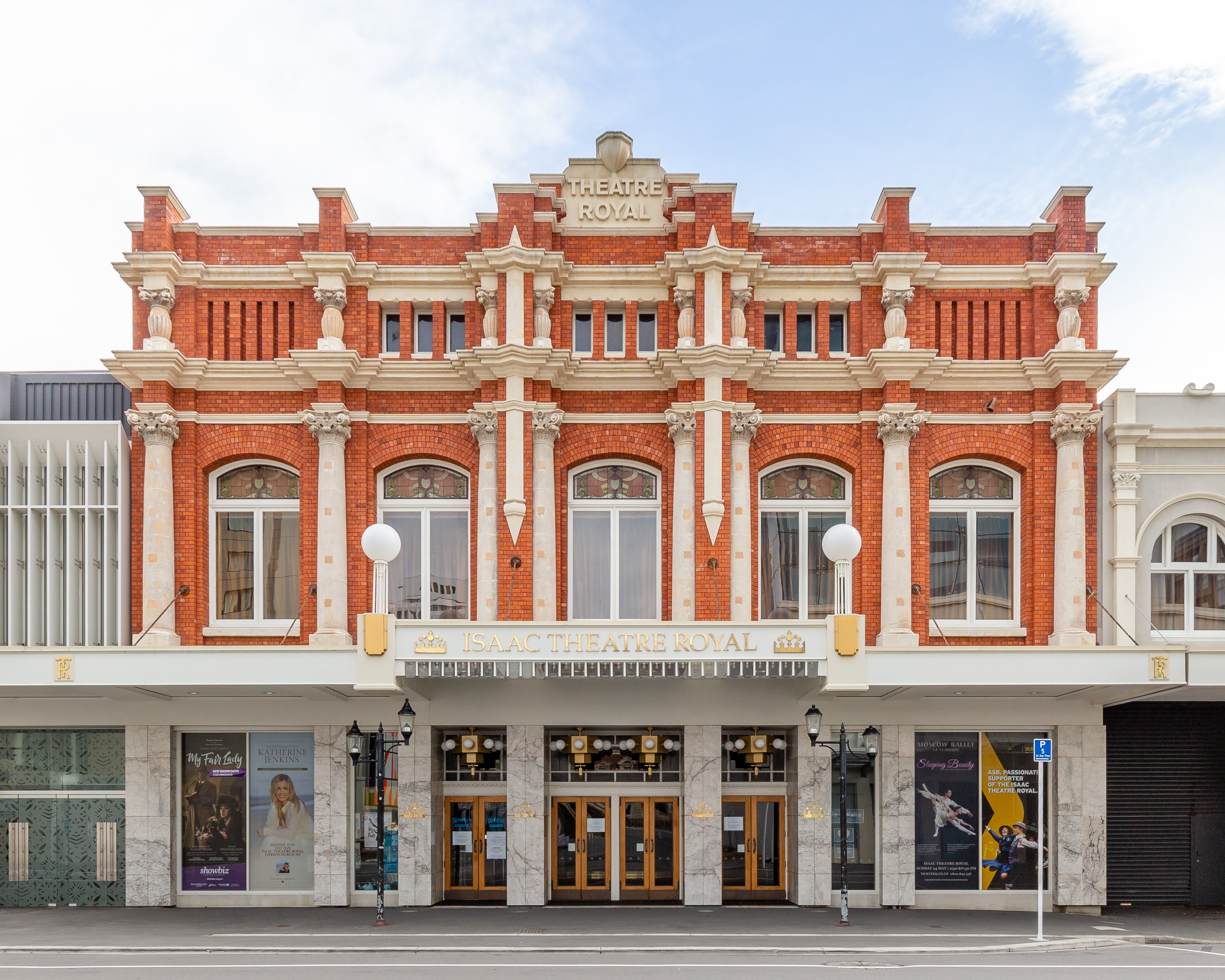
The Isaac Theatre Royal, with Edwardian-style architecture

Christchurch has a long history with performing arts, dating back to December 1861, when the first theatre opened on the current site of The Press building on Gloucester Street. Across the road from that building is the Isaac Theatre Royal, originally opened in 1863, and has since been rebuilt four times, most recently the building was moderately damaged following the 2011 earthquake. The Isaac Theatre Royal reopened to the public on 17 November 2014.

Christchurch has one full-time professional theatre, the Court Theatre, founded in 1971. Originally based in the Christchurch Arts Centre, the Court Theatre has been located in the suburb of Addington in temporary accommodation following the 2011 earthquakes. Construction of a new premises located in the Performing Arts Precinct was complete in 2025 with the presentation of Bruce Mason's play The End of the Golden Weather.

The Free Theatre Christchurch was established in 1979 and based in the Arts Centre from 1982, and Showbiz Christchurch, an incorporated society established in 1938 and primarily producing musical theatre. There is also an active recreational theatre scene with community-based theatre companies, such as the Christchurch Repertory Society, Elmwood Players, Riccarton Players, and Canterbury Children's Theatre, producing many quality shows.

Pacific Underground is a theatre and music company that was established in Christchurch in 1993, with many well known New Zealand artists starting out with them including Oscar Kightley, David Fane, Ladi6 and Scribe. Their first theatre production was Fresh Off the Boat, by Kightley and Simon Small presented at the Arts Centre.

=== Music ===
The city is known for its many live acts, including a professional symphony orchestra. After the closure of Canterbury Opera in 2006, due to financial reasons, in 2009 another professional opera company, Southern Opera, was founded. After the 2010 and 2011 earthquakes, it suspended its activities, before merging with New Zealand Opera in 2013. Christchurch is a home for the experimental music scene of New Zealand.

Singer-songwriter Hayley Westenra launched her international career by busking in Christchurch. Some of New Zealand's other acts, such as Shapeshifter, Ladi6, Tiki Taane and Truth are from Christchurch.

In recent developments, hip hop has effectively landed in Christchurch. In 2000, First Aotearoa Hip Hop Summit was held there. And in 2003, Christchurch's Scribe released his debut album in New Zealand and has received five times platinum in that country, in addition to achieving two number one singles.

Since 2015 the city has hosted Electric Avenue, a two-day music festival in Hagley Park which is the largest held in Australasia. Taking place annually in February, the festival hosts international and domestic acts, such as Lorde, The Chemical Brothers, and The Prodigy being amongst recent headliners.

=== Venues ===
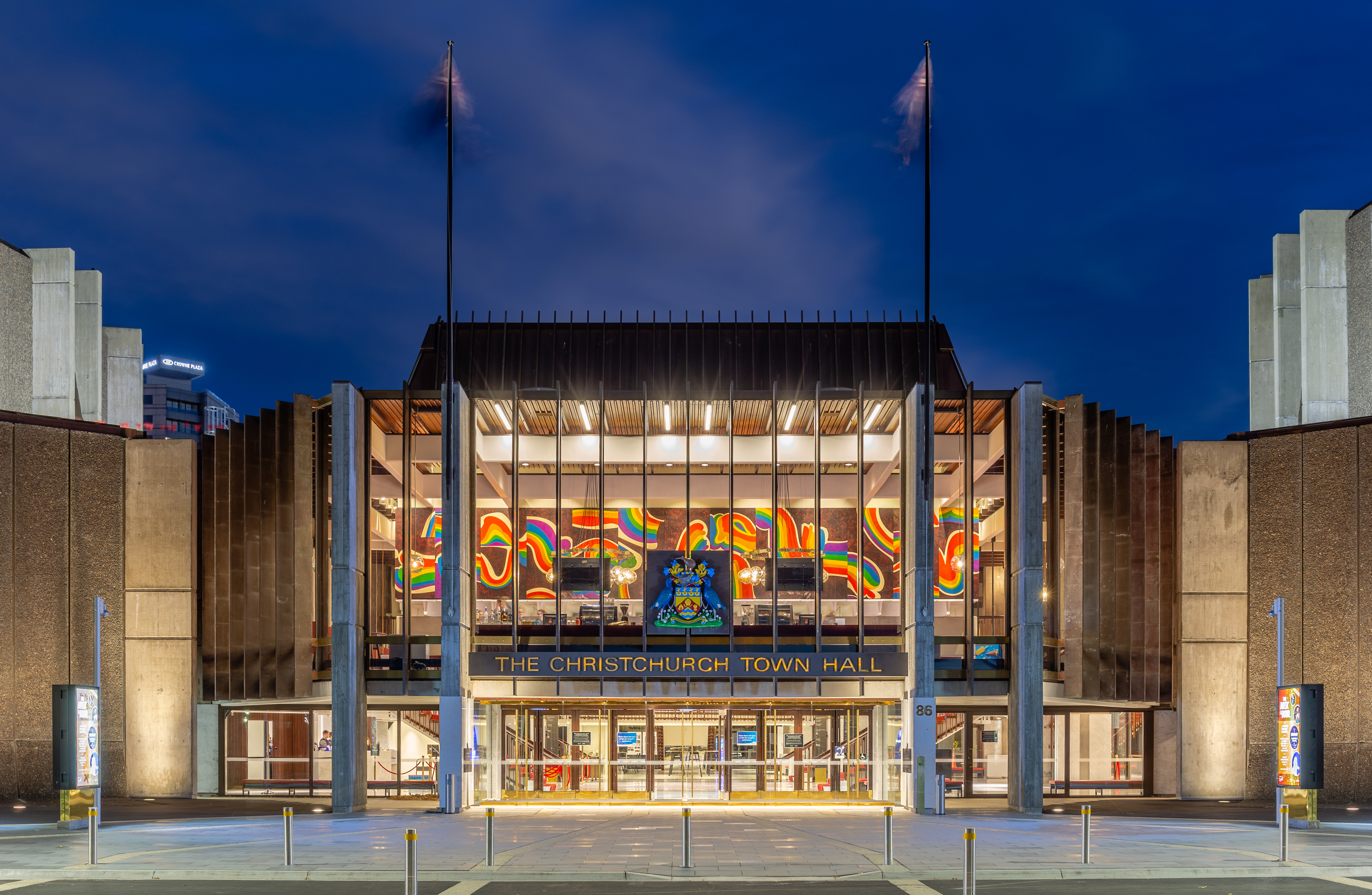
Christchurch Town Hall (2019)

Situated in Addington, the Wolfbrook Arena is the city's major multipurpose indoor arena. The venue has capacity for nearly 9000 people when configured for concerts. In sports, it is one of the home venues of the Mainland Tactix netball side and was the venue for the 1999 World Netball championships.

The Christchurch Town Hall auditorium opened in September 1972, it was the first major auditorium design by architects Warren and Mahoney and acousticians Marshall Day. It is still recognised as a model example of concert-hall design with an excellent modern pipe organ. The hall was reopened on 23 February 2019, after being closed for eight years for repair after the significant damage caused by the February 2011 Christchurch earthquake.

Christchurch also has a casino, and there are also a wide range of live music venues – some short-lived, others with decades of history. Classical music concerts were held at the Christchurch Music Centre until it was demolished as a result of earthquake damage. The Piano was built to offer a variety of performance spaces for music and the arts.

In late 2014 it was announced that a 475 million dollar project was underway to build a convention centre located on the block defined by Armagh Street, Oxford Terrace, Worcester Street and Colombo Street. Gloucester Street becomes part of the Centre itself, but allows for retail use and public access. The convention centre, now called Te Pae, hosts several events at the same time; starting with space for up to 2,000 people, this complements facilities in Auckland and Queenstown. Te Pae opened on 17 December 2021.

In 2012, in the Christchurch Central Recovery Plan, it was announced there will be a replacement for Lancaster Park. Construction started on a new stadium in 2022: named Te Kaha, it was completed in April 2026.

=== Festivals ===
Word Christchurch is a long running literary festival, the director in 2023 was Steph Walker. The regular Christchurch Arts Festival wound up in 2023 after more than 50 years with their assets donated to the WORD literary festival. Christchurch had a Festival of Transitional Architecture (FESTA) from 2012 to 2018 founded by architectural historian Jessica Halliday. This has turned into an annual festival of architecture events called Open Christchurch since 2019 run by Te Pūtahi Centre for Architecture and City Making. Pacific Underground established the Pacific Arts Festival in Christchurch in 2001 and it ran until 2010. Christchurch hosts the World Buskers Festival in January each year.

=== Architecture ===
The architecture of Christchurch is said to be distinctly English, with some notable Gothic Revival architecture. Other less prominent styles, such as the many utility buildings, pump houses and electricity substations placed in suburban streets, are features of the city's social history. The Christchurch movement of architecture began in the late 1950s and is characterised by elements of New Brutalist architecture and practical minimalist interiors.

== Sport ==
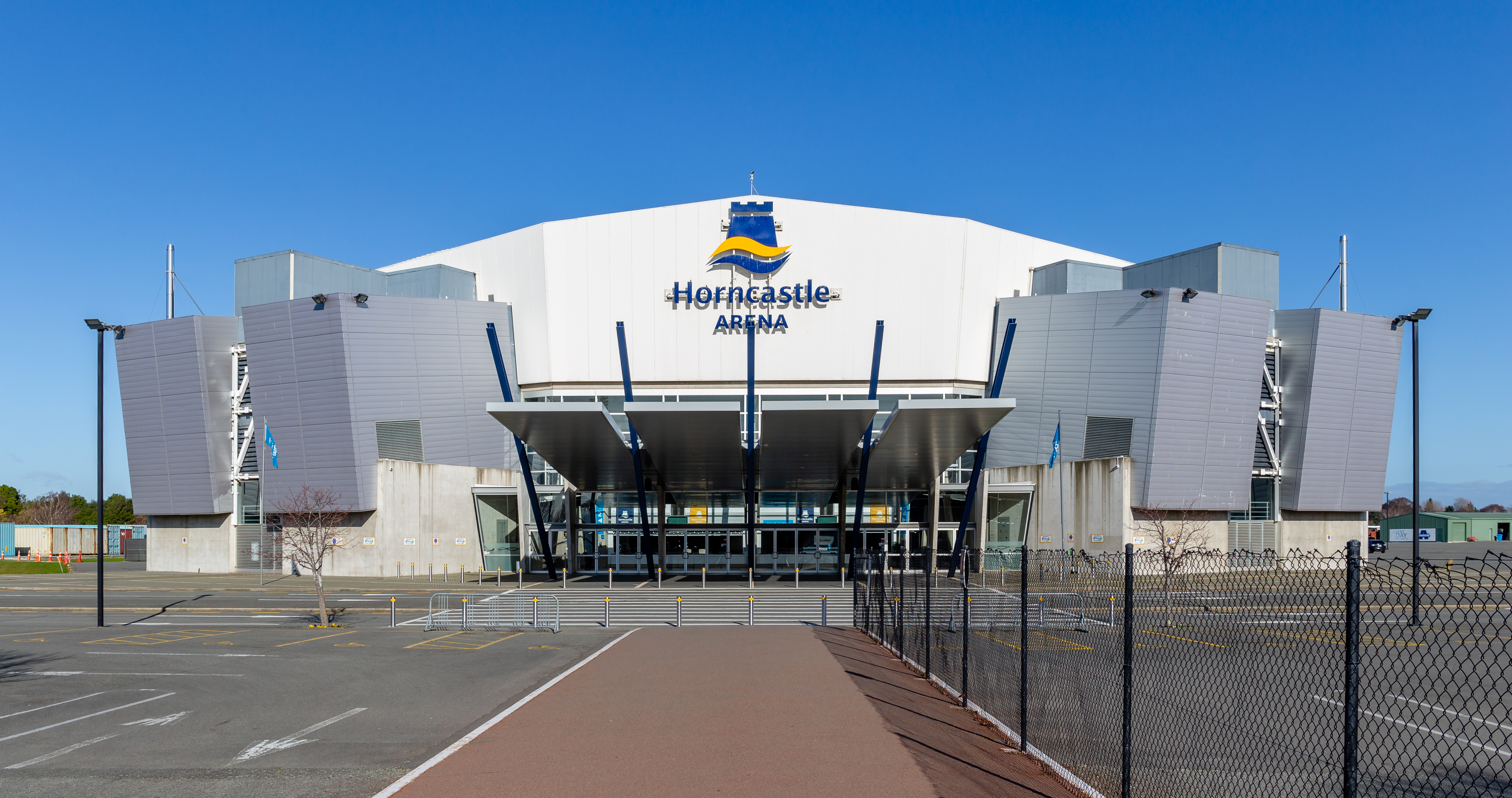
Wolfbrook Arena under old signage, in August 2019

Sport in Christchurch has developed from the time of the initial settlement of Canterbury by British migrants, and remains an important part of community life. Cricket and rugby union have been popular team sports since the early years of settlement, with the first cricket club established in the city in 1851, and the first rugby club in 1863. Interest in organised sports has diversified and now includes a wide range of codes. In 2022, the top five sporting codes in Canterbury based on club membership were netball, touch rugby, rugby union, golf and cricket.

There are about 1,200 sports clubs and associations, and in 2022 there were 140,000 affiliated members. Most of the sporting codes remain amateur, and rely upon volunteers as administrators and officials. However, there are some professional teams. Notable teams representing Christchurch or the Canterbury region include the Mainland Tactix (netball), Crusaders (rugby), Canterbury Kings (cricket), and South Island United (football) who operate in Christchurch as the professional extension of Christchurch United.

The city has hosted many international competitions including championship events. A particularly notable international event held in Christchurch was the 1974 Commonwealth Games.

There are many outdoor sportsgrounds and a variety of indoor venues. Christchurch City Council maintains 110 sportsgrounds across Christchurch City and Banks Peninsula. A large indoor sports, exhibition and entertainment venue was constructed adjacent to the Addington Raceway in 1998. As of 2025 the venue is named Wolfbrook Arena. The sports venues Lancaster Park and Queen Elizabeth II Park were damaged beyond repair in the 2011 Christchurch earthquake, and were demolished. New facilities built to replace those damaged in the earthquake include the Ngā Puna Wai Sports Hub, the Parakiore Recreation and Sport Centre — an aquatic and indoor sports venue which opened in December 2025, and a multi–purpose covered stadium Te Kaha seating 30,000 spectators, which opened in April 2026.

== Education ==
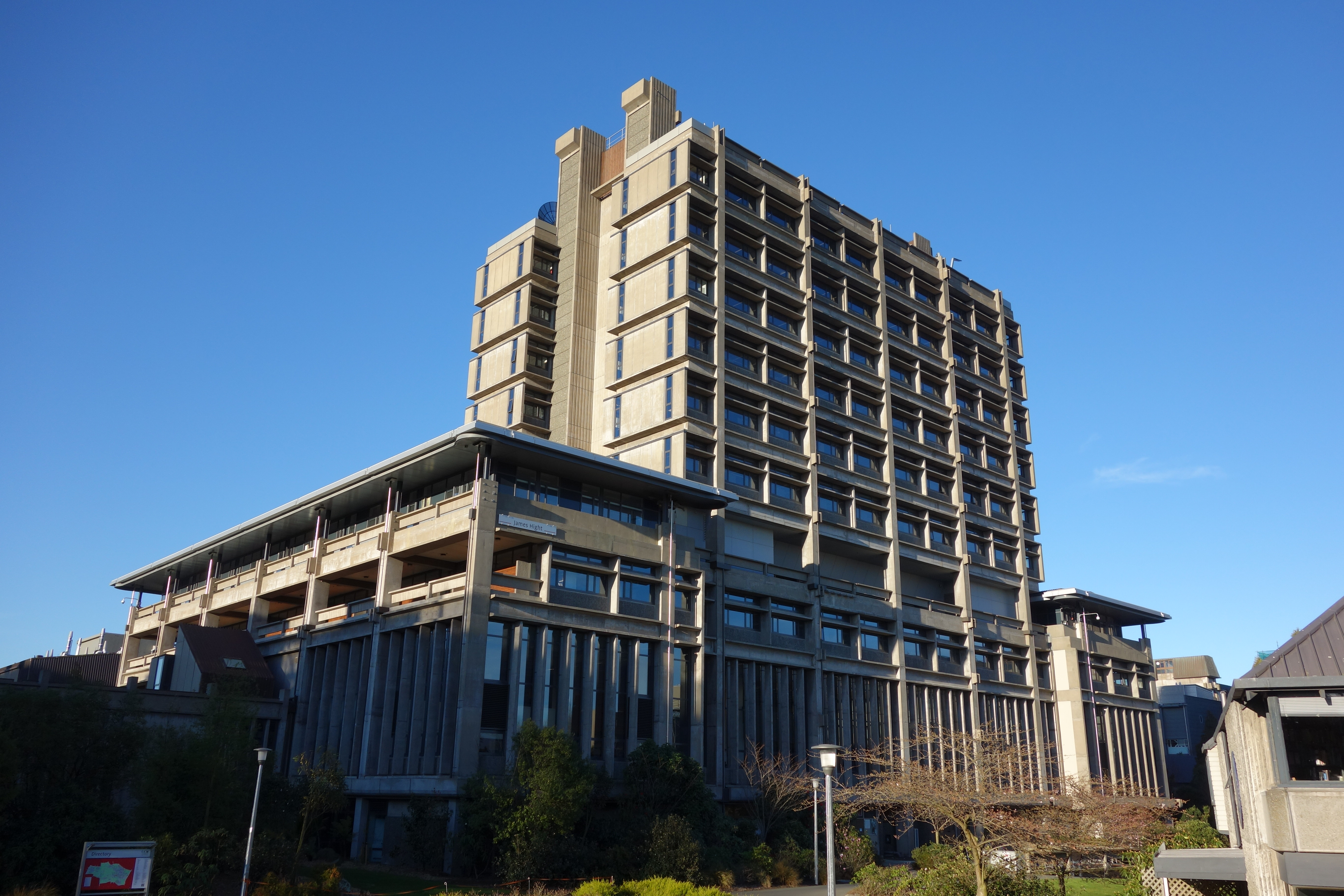
The University of Canterbury is a tertiary education provider for Christchurch

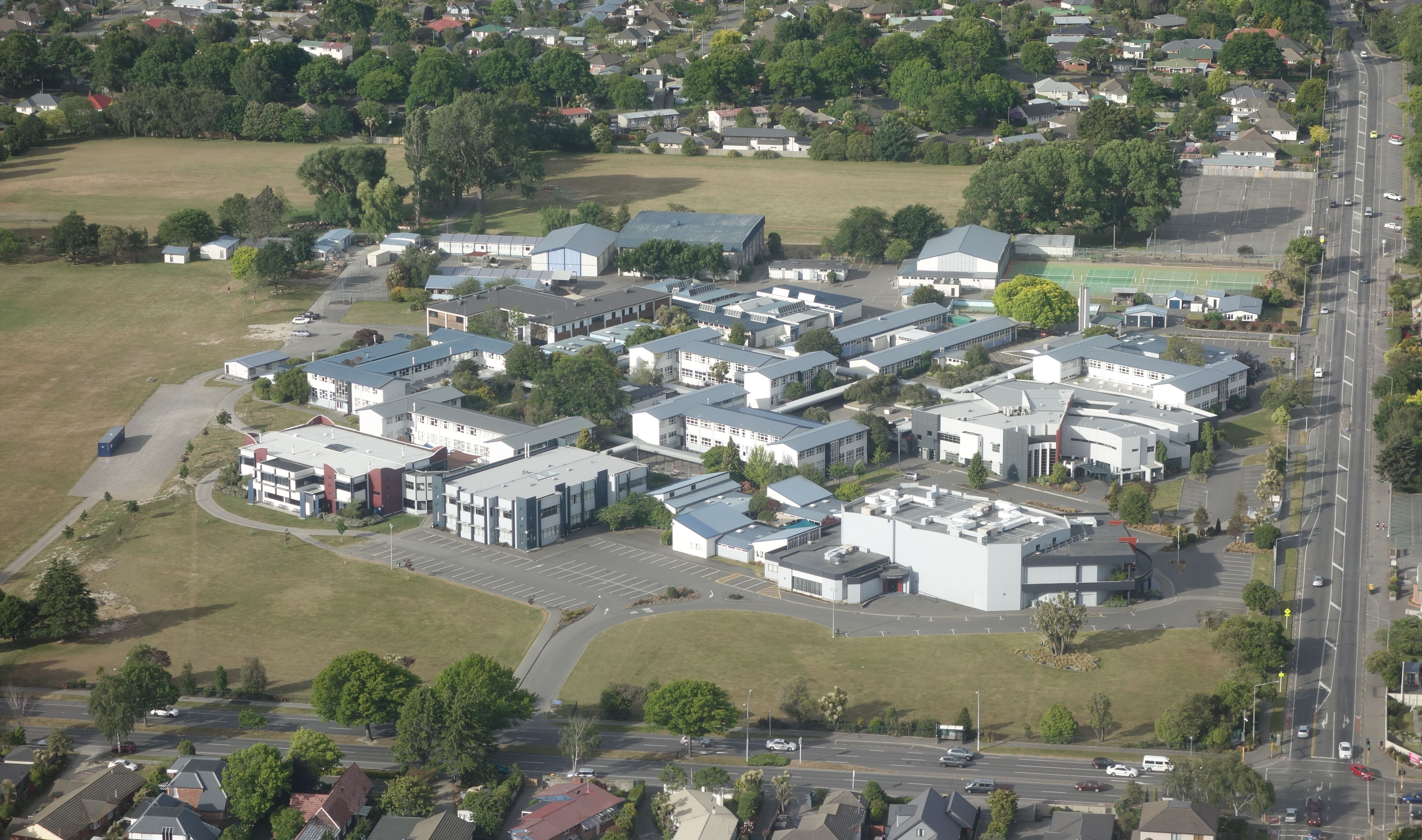
Burnside High School, the largest school in Christchurch

=== Secondary schools ===
Christchurch has the fourth-largest school in New Zealand, the co-educational state school, Burnside High School, with 2,724 pupils. Cashmere High School, Papanui High School and Riccarton High School are the other co-ed schools. There are four single-sex state schools: Shirley Boys' High School, Christchurch Boys' High School, Avonside Girls' High School and Christchurch Girls' High School.

Christchurch also has co-educational and single-sex Independent schools and Church schools. These are St Thomas of Canterbury College, St Margaret's College, Christ's College, St Bede's College, Marian College, Catholic Cathedral College, St Andrew's College, Villa Maria College and Rangi Ruru Girls' School.

Less conventional schools in the city are Ao Tawhiti, Hagley Community College, and the Christchurch Rudolf Steiner School.

=== Tertiary institutions ===
Tertiary education institutions with campuses in or near Christchurch are

- Ara Institute of Canterbury
- Lincoln University
- University of Canterbury
- University of Otago
- Te Wānanga o Aotearoa

== Transport ==
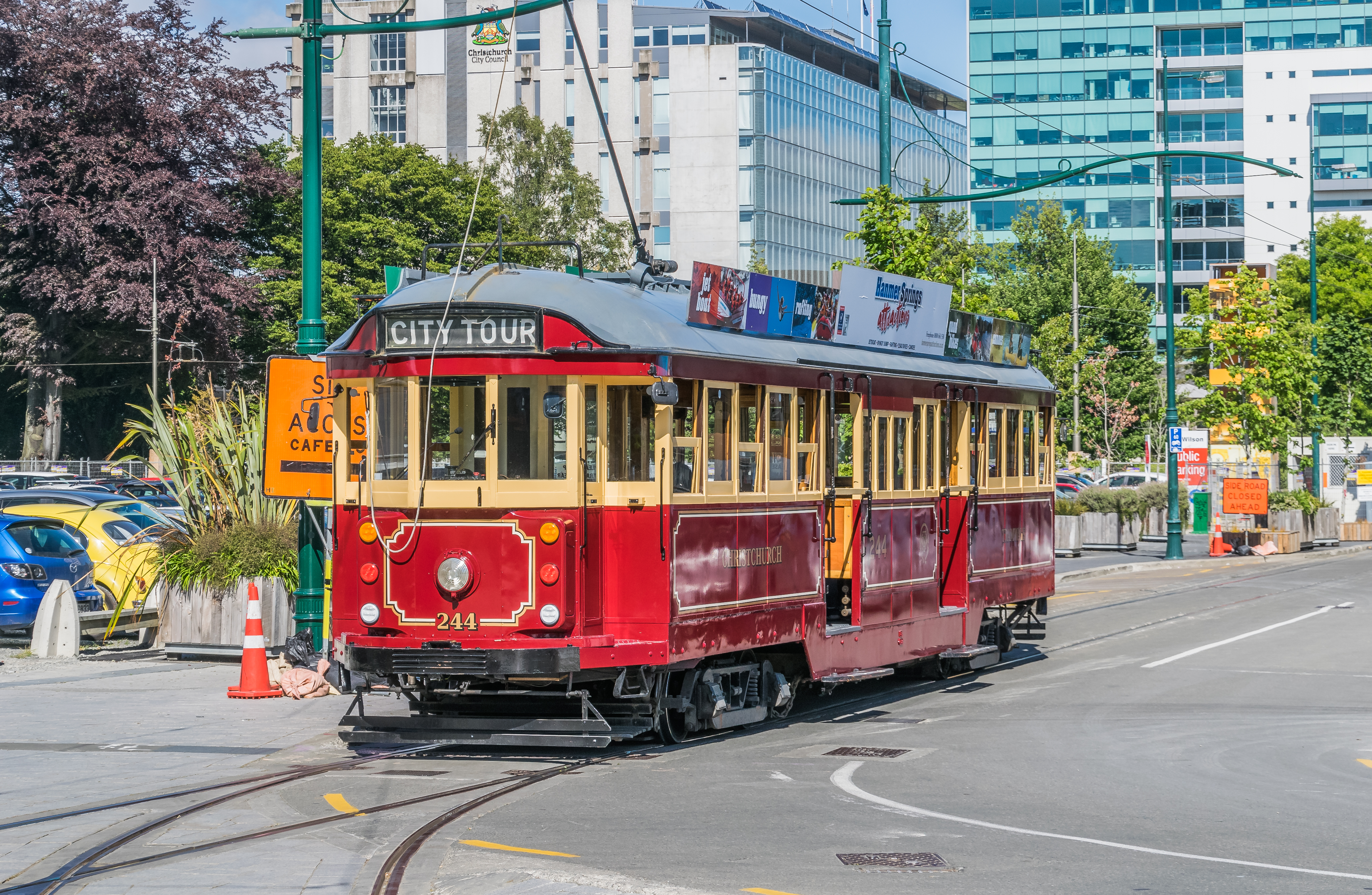
Christchurch Brill Tram No 244 on the heritage tramway in inner-city Christchurch

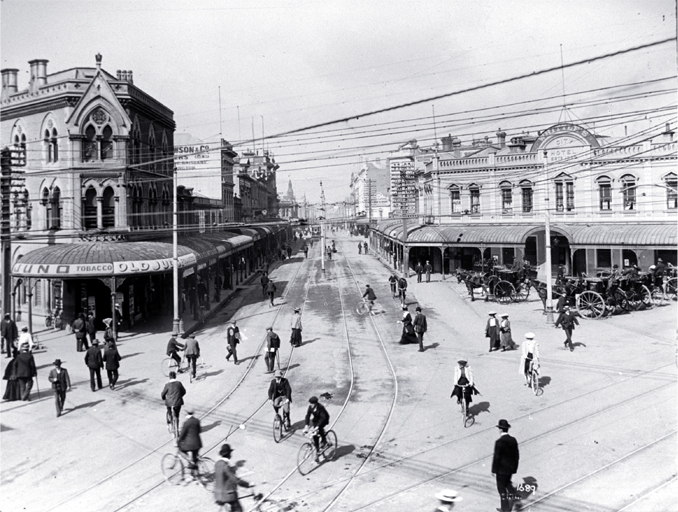
Looking down High Street while cyclists cross the intersection of Colombo and Hereford Streets (c. 1910)

Private cars are the dominant form of transport in Christchurch, with 62% of commuter journeys utilising a private car, as of 2020. Historically, decisions on land use and infrastructure investment in Christchurch have tended to favour car travel, resulting in high adoption of cars. As of 2022, Christchurch has almost 2,500 kilometres (1,600 mi) of roads. The city is served by State Highways 1, 73, 74, 74A, 75 and 76. Christchurch has three motorways consisting of the Christchurch Northern Motorway (includes the Western Belfast Bypass), Christchurch Southern Motorway and the Christchurch-Lyttelton Motorway.

Christchurch has an extensive bus network, with bus routes serving most areas of the city and satellite towns. The local bus service, marketed as Metro, is provided by Environment Canterbury. The topology of the network broadly follow a spoke–hub distribution paradigm, with major routes intersecting the city and crossing at the central Christchurch Bus Interchange. Less-frequent 'connector' and 'link' services provide journeys between suburbs not on the major routes. Additionally, a service called the Orbiter connects the suburban mall hubs by running in a ring around the outside of the central city. Before the 2011 earthquakes, in addition to normal bus services, Christchurch also had a zero-fare hybrid bus service, the Shuttle, in the inner city. The service was suspended following the earthquakes. As of 2023 public transport mode share in the Greater Christchurch area was 2.8%, with daily journeys still well-below pre-earthquake levels.

Historically, Christchurch has been known as New Zealand's cycling city, even earning the nickname "Cyclopolis" around the turn of the 20th century. Mark Twain described Christchurch in 1895 as a place "where half the people ride bicycles and the other half are kept busy dodging them". The central city has very flat terrain and the Christchurch City Council has established a network of cycling infrastructure in the form of both dedicated and shared paths, such as the major Northern Line Cycleway. Post-quake public consultation on rebuilding the city expressed a strong desire for a more sustainable transport system, particularly greater use of cycling; this was reflected in the council's 2012–42 strategic transport plan. The number of cycle paths across the city has continued to increase since the earthquakes, with the roll-out of the Major Cycle Route initiative intending to create 100 kilometres (62 mi) of cycle paths in the city. This has contributed to a 30% increase in bicycle journeys between 2016 and 2023, with over 3.6 million cyclists detected at counting stations in a 12-month period. Data from the 2023 census revealed Christchurch as a national leader in the adoption of cycling as commuter transport. Nearly 25% of all bicycle commuters in New Zealand live in Christchurch, with the highest levels of adoption in suburbs with robust cycle infrastructure.

Trams were running as public transport in Christchurch as early as 1880, with the system mostly electrified beginning in 1905. Routes mostly centred around Cathedral Square connecting out as far as Papanui, New Brighton and Sumner, but all had ceased operating by 1954. In 1995, the Christchurch tramway system was re-established as a tourist attraction. The tram follows a short loop around central city streets, with stops at Cathedral Square, the Arts Centre, Canterbury Museum, Victoria Square and Cathedral Junction, which is also the location of the depot. The tram tracks are owned by the Christchurch City Council, with the trams supplied, maintained and operated by the Tramways Historical Society. In 2022 the tram tracks were extended south down High Street at a cost of NZ$3,600,000, though due to an engineering issue they derailed a tram and had to be relaid.

There is a cable car system called the Christchurch Gondola which operates as a tourist attraction, providing transport from the Heathcote Valley to the top of Mount Cavendish in the city's south-east.

Rail services, both long-distance and commuter, used to focus on the former railway station on Moorhouse avenue. Commuter trains were progressively cancelled in the 1960s and 1970s. The last such service, between Christchurch and Rangiora, ceased in 1976. After the reduction in services, a new Christchurch railway station was established at Addington Junction. The Main North Line railway travels northwards via Kaikōura to Picton and is served by the Coastal Pacific scheduled passenger train while the Main South Line heads to Invercargill via Dunedin and was used by the Southerner until its cancellation in 2002.

The most famous train to depart Christchurch is the TranzAlpine, which travels along the Main South Line to Rolleston and then turns onto the Midland Line, passes through the Southern Alps via the Otira Tunnel, and terminates in Greymouth on the West Coast. The TranzAlpine service is primarily a tourist service and carries no significant commuter traffic.

Christchurch Airport is located in Harewood, 12 kilometres (7.5 mi) to the north-west of the city centre. The airport is the second-busiest airport in New Zealand, with regular passenger services from Christchurch to sixteen New Zealand and seven international destinations. The airport serves as the major base for the New Zealand, South Korean, Italian and United States Antarctic programs.

== Utilities ==
=== Water supply ===
Christchurch has one of the highest-quality water supplies in the world, with its water rated among the purest and cleanest in the world. Untreated, naturally filtered water is sourced, via more than 50 pumping stations surrounding the city, from aquifers emanating from the foothills of the Southern Alps. However, since 2018 about 70% of Christchurch's water supply has been temporarily chlorinated due to well-head upgrades, and the chlorination is planned to be stopped after the upgrades have been completed and certified.

=== Wastewater ===
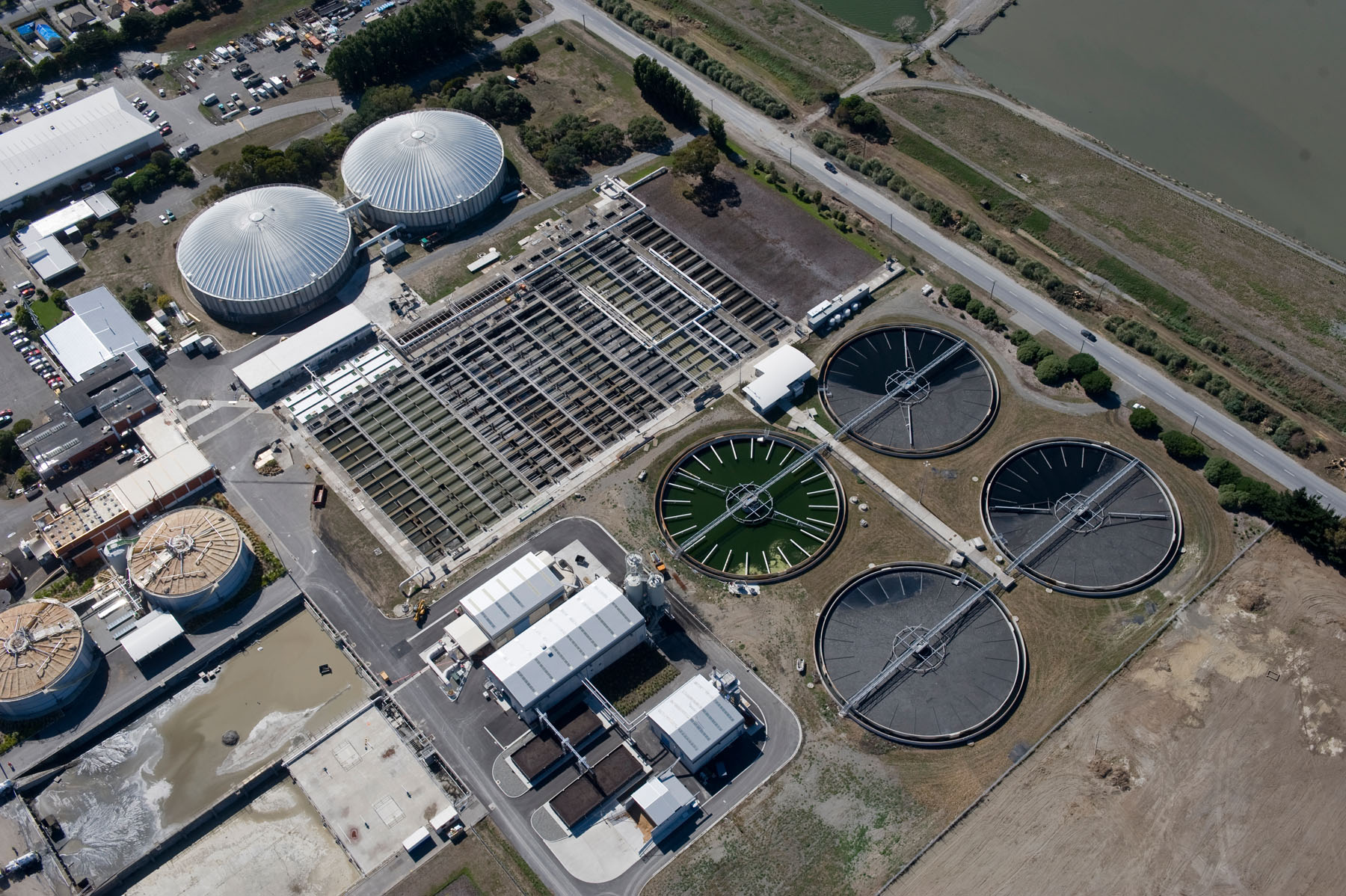
Christchurch Wastewater Treatment Plant after the 2011 earthquake

Christchurch was the first city in New Zealand to develop an underground sewerage network. In the early 1870s, Christchurch had a population of about 12,000 people. However, there was a high death rate from diseases such as typhoid, with 152 people dying in an epidemic from 1875 to 1876. The city was considered as the unhealthiest in New Zealand at that time. Most of the human waste was being discharged untreated into the Avon and Heathcote rivers, despite those rivers also being used for bathing. Following the passing of the Christchurch District Drainage Act 1875, the Christchurch Drainage Board was established, holding its first meeting on 4 January 1876. The first chairman of the board was the city mayor, Fred Hobbs, who had been a strong advocate for a drainage system.

In 1878, an English drainage engineer William Clark proposed detailed designs for an underground sewerage network for the city, with a pumping station to pump the sewage to sandhills in Bromley for irrigation over land adjacent to the estuary. The city's first sewage pumping station was established in Tuam Street in 1882, with a boiler and steam-driven pumps. Homeowners were required to pay for a connection to the new sewerage system and establish flushing toilets, and by 1884 there were 293 connections. The 1903 Cyclopedia of New Zealand stated that following the implementation of the drainage system "the city now ranks amongst the most healthy in the Colony".

=== Electricity ===
The Christchurch City Council established the city's first public electricity supply in 1903, and the city was connected to Coleridge Power Station in 1914. Until 1989, electricity distribution and retailing in Christchurch was the responsibility of four entities: the Christchurch City Council Municipal Electricity Department (MED), Riccarton Electricity, the Port Hills Energy Authority, and the Central Canterbury Electric Power Board. In 1989, all four companies entered a joint venture, named Southpower. The 1998 electricity sector reforms required all electricity companies to separate their distribution and retailing businesses. Southpower retained its distribution business and sold its retail business to Meridian Energy. In December 1998, the distribution business was renamed Orion New Zealand. Today, Orion owns and operates the local distribution network servicing the city, with electricity fed into it from two Transpower substations at Islington and Bromley.

The electricity distribution network in Christchurch suffered significant damage in the 2011 earthquakes, especially in the north-east, where the 66,000-volt subtransmission cables supplying the area were damaged beyond repair. This necessitated major repairs to the existing infrastructure, as well as building new infrastructure to supply new housing developments.

At the 2013 census, 94.0% of Christchurch homes were heated wholly or partly by electricity, the highest in the country.

=== Telecommunications ===
Telephone service was introduced in Christchurch on 1 October 1881 with the commissioning of New Zealand's first telephone exchange. The city converted to fully automatic service on 14 September 1929. Subscriber toll dialling was introduced in Christchurch from 19 November 1976, with the city given the area code 03. Between 1990 and 1992, the 03 area code was expanded to cover the entire South Island, and Christchurch telephone numbers were lengthened from six to seven digits by prefixing 3 to existing numbers. Mobile phone service was introduced to Christchurch on 5 September 1988 by Telecom (now Spark).

As part of the Ultra Fast Broadband initiative, fibre to the premises was rolled out in Christchurch during the 2010s, with the network completed in August 2018. Enable Networks operates the fibre network in Christchurch and Lyttelton, while Chorus Limited operates the fibre network in Diamond Harbour and in towns on the Banks Peninsula. Chorus also operates the copper network across all of Christchurch City.

== Media ==
The major daily newspaper in Christchurch is The Press, which has a daily circulation of 31,207 and is owned by Stuff. The Press was first published on 25 May 1861, originally as a weekly paper before becoming a daily paper in March 1863. Weekly newspapers include The Star, owned by Allied Press, which began in 1868 as a daily evening newspaper before becoming a bi-weekly (and later weekly) free newspaper in 1991.

The Christchurch radio market is the second-largest in New Zealand, with 542,600 listeners aged 10 and over. The largest commercial stations in Christchurch by market share as of May 2025 are Newstalk ZB (15.3%), The Breeze (11.9%), More FM (11.2%), The Rock (9.4%), and The Sound (7.6%). As with other New Zealand radio markets, most radio stations in Christchurch are centralcast out of Auckland.

Television was introduced in Christchurch on 1 June 1961 with channel CHTV3. The channel networked with its NZBC counterparts in Auckland, Wellington and Dunedin in 1969 and today is part of Television New Zealand (TVNZ). As with radio, television channels in Christchurch are centralcast out of Auckland.

== Sister cities ==
Christchurch's sister cities are:

- Adelaide, South Australia (1972)
- Christchurch, Dorset, England, United Kingdom (1972)
- Kurashiki, Okayama, Japan (1973)
- Seattle, Washington, United States (1981)
- Songpa-gu, Seoul, South Korea (1995)
- Wuhan, Hubei, China (2006)

Christchurch also has friendly relations with Gansu in China.

== See also ==
- Christchurch City Holdings
- List of radio stations in Christchurch
- List of tallest buildings in Christchurch
- List of people from Christchurch
