= History of Christchurch =

Christchurch is a major city in the Canterbury Region, and is the largest city in the South Island of New Zealand. With a Māori history stemming back to the thirteenth century as the domain of the historic Waitaha iwi, Christchurch was constituted as a colonial outpost of the British Empire in 1850. Today Christchurch is the second largest city in New Zealand, after Auckland, with a metropolitan population of over half a million.

The area of modern-day Christchurch was originally swampland with patches of marshland and grassland. Evidence of Māori activity in the area goes as far back as 1250 AD. Māori settlements within the area later settled by colonists took advantage of nearby food gathering sources, such as rivers, streams and the Avon Heathcote Estuary (Te Ihutai), a traditional food-gathering estuary for local iwi. Māori were also believed to have been moa hunter-gatherers, who occupied coastal caves around the modern-day suburb of Sumner.

The Canterbury Association's Chief Surveyor, Captain Joseph Thomas, surveyed the area in 1849 and 1850. Working with his assistant, Edward Jollie, they named the various ports and settlements in the area, and chose a simple grid pattern for the streets of Christchurch. The First Four Ships were chartered by the Canterbury Association and brought the first 792 Canterbury Pilgrims to Port Cooper (later called Lyttelton) in 1850.

Christchurch was heavily industrialised in the early 20th century, particularly the suburbs of Woolston and Addington. Many warehouses, factories and large premises of railway workshops were built along the Main South Line. There was notable development of breweries, flour mills, and light commercial businesses in Christchurch during this time period. Christchurch later hosted the 1974 British Commonwealth Games at the purpose-built Queen Elizabeth II Park.

== Pre-European settlement ==
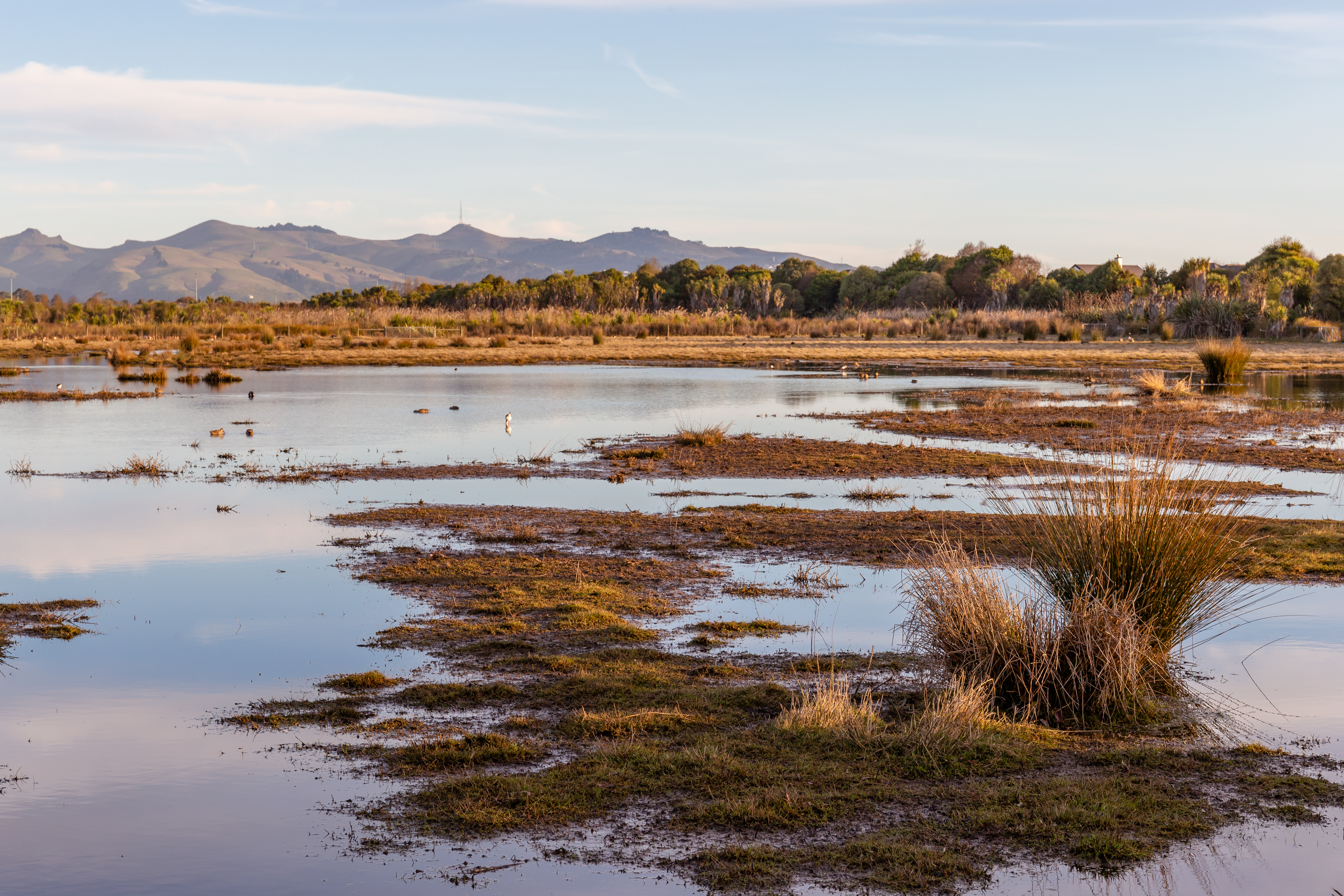
Much of the area of present day Christchurch was originally swamp. Travis Wetland (pictured) is an ecological reserve showing how some areas of the wider region might have appeared to the early settlers.

The area of modern-day Christchurch was originally swampland with patchworks of marshland, grassland, scrub and some patches of tall forest of mostly kahikatea, mataī and tōtara. The inner coastal sand dunes were covered in hardier scrub bush, including akeake, taupata, tūmatakuru, ngaio, carmichaelia, and coprosma.

Evidence of human activity in the area goes as far back as 1250 AD, with evidence of prolonged occupation beginning no later than 1350 AD. These people in the pre-historic Māori period are believed to have been moa-hunters, who occupied coastal caves around modern-day Sumner. Excavations at Moncks Cave at Redcliffs, and the nearby Moa Bone Point Cave (Te Ana-o-Hineraki), have provided valuable insights into the early Māori occupation of the area. Moncks Cave is considered to be one of the greatest archaeological finds in New Zealand.

The early settlers and their descendants are known from Ngāi Tahu tradition as the Waitaha iwi. Around c. 1500 the Kāti Māmoe tribe migrated south from the east coast of the North Island, and gained control of much of Canterbury. They were later joined by Ngāi Tahu beginning in c. 1600, who ultimately absorbed Waitaha through a mixture of conflict and marriage.

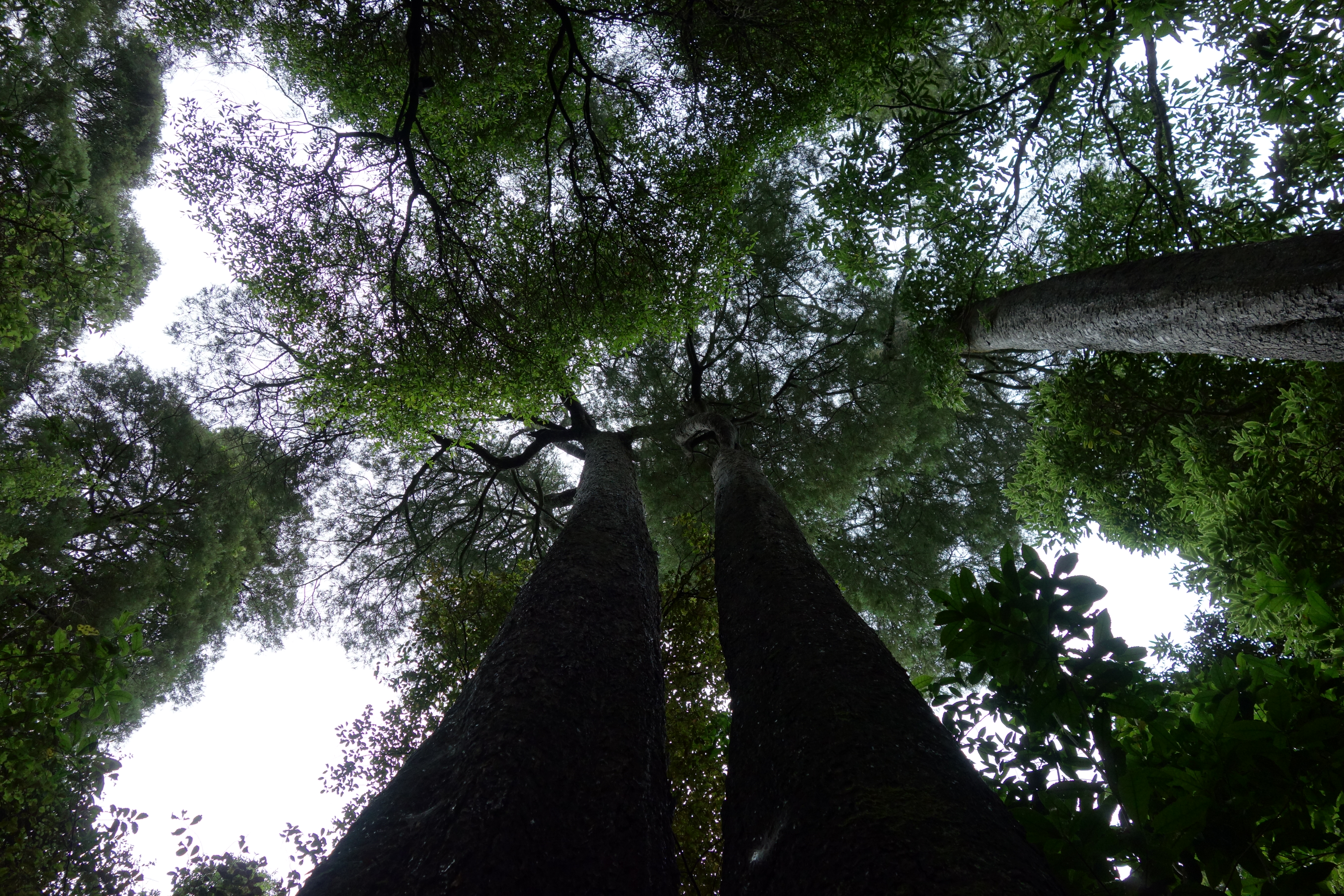
Riccarton Bush (pictured) is the only patch of original tall forest remaining in Christchurch

For these early Māori, the area of Christchurch was an important foraging ground and a seasonal settlement. The nearby major Ngāi Tahu pā at Kaiapoi was dependent on food gathered from the surrounding area, and the marshland rivers of Christchurch (the Avon River / Ōtākaro, Ōpāwaho / Heathcote River and the Styx River) were one of the richest eel-fisheries in the country, with semi-permanent eel weirs dotted along them. The cabbage trees that grew abundantly in the marshes were used to make sugar.

The most notable Māori settlements within Christchurch during the early-nineteenth century were at Pūtarikamotu (Note: Often spelled "Pūtaringamotu" or uncommonly, "Potoringamotu". The spelling with the Kāi Tahu dialect remains the primary Māori spelling.) in modern-day Riccarton, and Papanui. In both cases these were located in areas of surviving tall forest. In South New Brighton there was a major Māori settlement named Te Kai-a-Te-Karoro, this was an important area that had kelp gull presence and mānuka scrub. Te Ihutai (The Avon Heathcote Estuary) was an important food source for local iwi and hapū, the estuary providing food such as, flounder and shellfish. The mudflats near modern-day Sumner, were called Ohika paruparu. Shellfish was primarily gathered there. North New Brighton and the Travis Wetland were originally called Ōruapaeroa, this area previously was rich in eels and birdlife, numerous whare were demolished in 1862, after an early European settler acquired the land. Pūtarikamotu in particular was an important seasonal camp and foraging ground, providing birds, eels and fish. The main walking track connecting the major Ngāi Tahu settlements at Kaiapoi and Rāpaki passed through the heart of what is today the Christchurch Central City.

A significant portion of original forest cover on the northern slopes of the Port Hills was lost to fire in the period prior to European settlement, with further areas burned on the flat land.

== European settlement ==
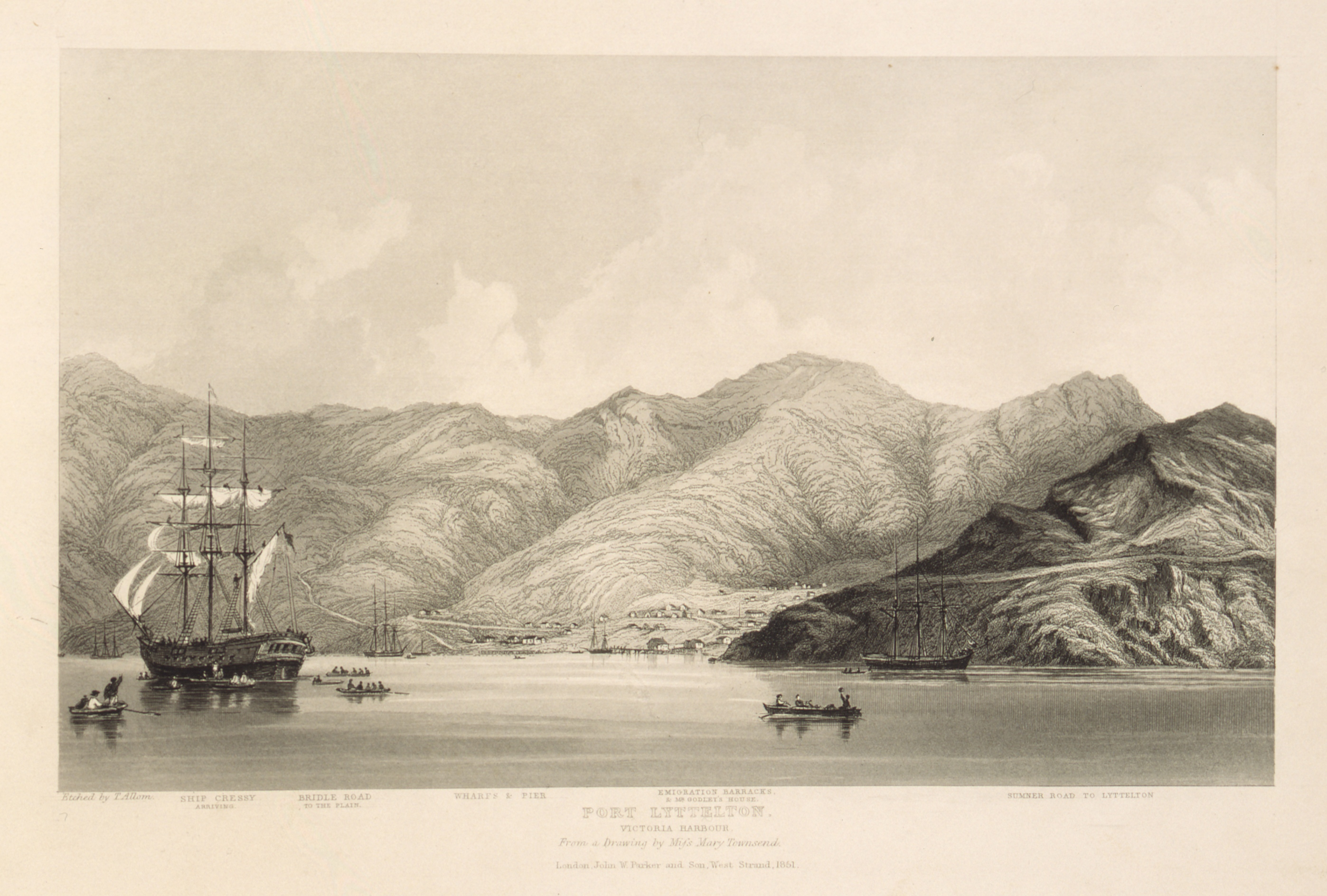
Cressy anchored at Port Lyttelton; drawing by Mary Townsend

A whaling station was established in 1839 by the Weller brothers, whalers of Otago and Sydney, at Oashore Bay just south of Lake Forsyth. The Wellers believed they had purchased much of the South Island, including Banks Peninsula from Kōrako, an Otago chief of Ngāi Tahu. On this basis, they on-sold much of the land to companies in Sydney. From the station at Oashore Bay, parties of European settlers led by James Herriott and a man known as McGillivray established themselves in what is now Christchurch, early in 1840. They found the isolated location difficult to manage in part due to the plagues of rats that destroyed their crops. After one season news reached them that the Weller claim was invalid and they abandoned the holdings. These were later taken over by brothers William and John Deans in 1843, who had more success in becoming established in the area. The Deans farm was a crucial factor in the decision of where to place the settlement of Christchurch, as it proved that the swampy ground could be farmed. The Deans brothers named their farm at Pūtarikamotu Riccarton after their former parish in Ayrshire, Scotland; they also named the river near their farm after the Avon Water in South Lanarkshire, which rises in the hills near to where their grandfather's farm was located.

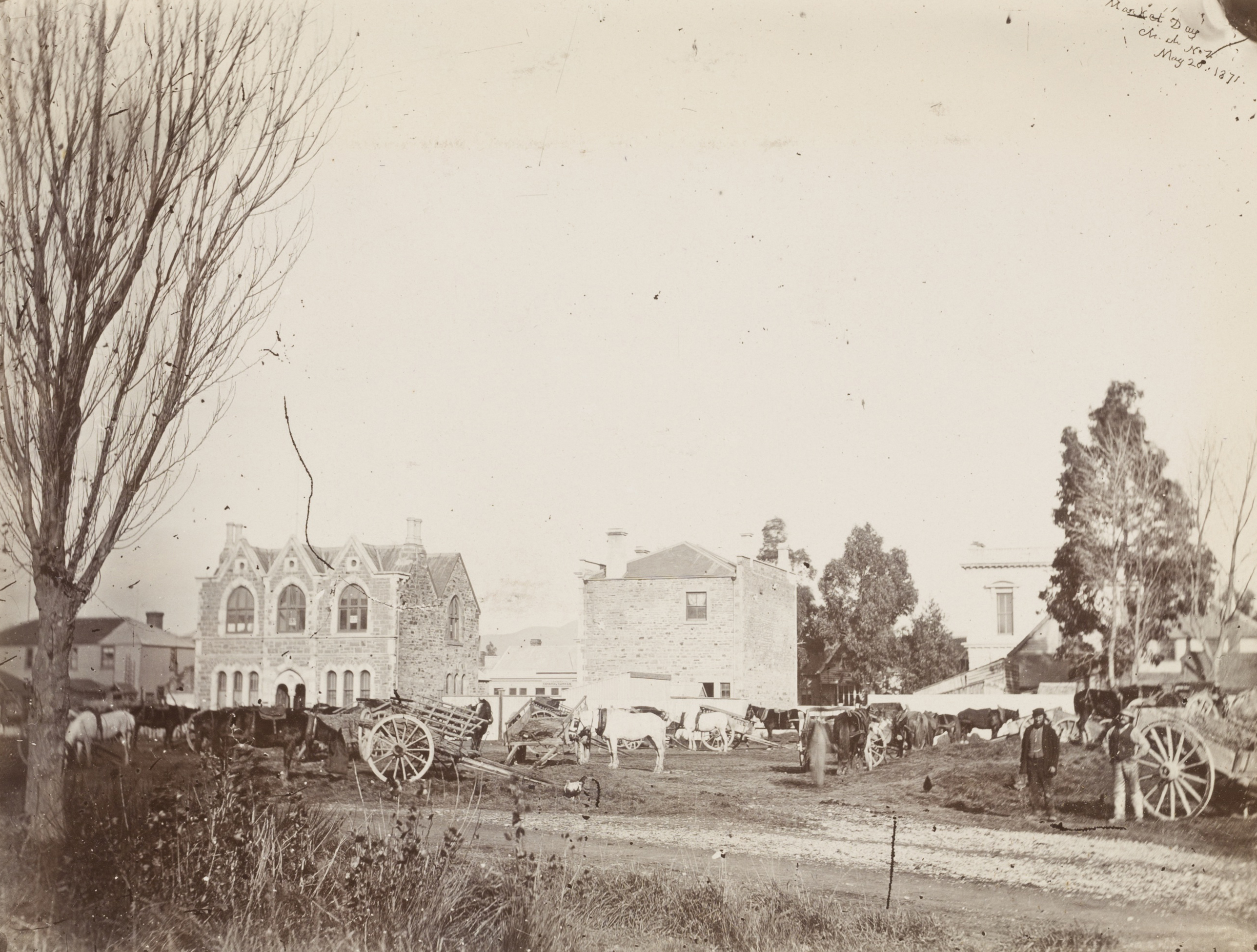
On market days in nearby Market Square, oxen and carts were parked in Cathedral Square (1871)

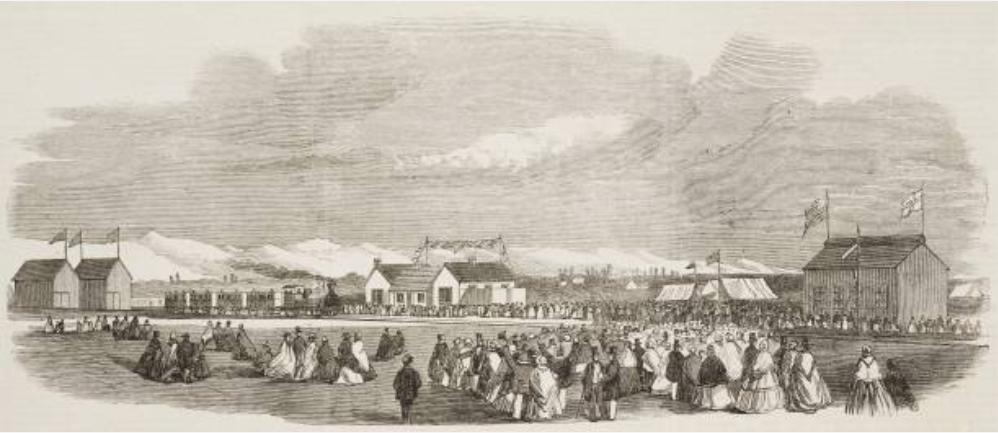
Opening of the Ferrymead Railway

The Canterbury Association's Chief Surveyor, Captain Joseph Thomas, surveyed the area in 1849 and 1850. Working with his assistant, Edward Jollie, they named the various ports and settlements in the area, and chose a simple grid pattern for the streets of Christchurch. The First Four Ships were chartered by the Canterbury Association and brought the first 792 of the Canterbury Pilgrims to Lyttelton Harbour in 1850. (Note: Lyttelton Harbour was known as Port Cooper when the four ships arrived. This name is no longer in common use. Since 1998 it has been gazetted with a dual English-Māori name, Lyttelton Harbour / Whakaraupō.) These sailing vessels were the Randolph, Charlotte Jane, Sir George Seymour, and Cressy. The journey took three to four months, and the Charlotte Jane was the first to arrive on 16 December 1850. They supplied local Māori with potatoes. A local chief (rangatira) showed a drawing of his tattoos (tā moko) to the Bishop. The Canterbury Pilgrims had aspirations of building a city around a cathedral and college, on the model of Christ Church in Oxford. In order to establish the city, the surrounding swamps had to be drained.

Transport between the port and the new settlement at Christchurch was a major problem for the early settlers. By December 1849, Thomas had commissioned the construction of a road from Port Cooper, later Lyttelton, to Christchurch via Evans Pass and Sumner. By the time that John Robert Godley arrived in April 1850 all of the funds for public works had been used up in constructing the road. Godley ordered that all work on the road should stop, leaving the steep foot and pack horse track that had been hastily constructed over the hill between the port and the Heathcote valley as the only land-access to the area of Christchurch. This track became known as the Bridle Path because the path was so steep that pack horses needed to be led by the bridle. Goods that were too heavy or bulky to be transported by pack horse over the Bridle Path were shipped by small sailing vessels some 13 kilometres (8.1 mi) by sea around the coast and up the Avon Heathcote Estuary to Ferrymead. Overturned boats at the Sumner bar were a frequent cause of new arrivals to the colony losing all their luggage. The Sumner Road was completed in 1857, though this did not alleviate the transport problems. In 1858 the provincial superintendent William Sefton Moorhouse announced that a tunnel would be dug between Lyttelton and Christchurch. While the tunnel was under construction, New Zealand's first public railway line, the Ferrymead Railway, opened from Ferrymead to Christchurch in 1863. After some delays the tunnel opened at the end of 1867. This was the world's first tunnel driven through the wall of an extinct volcano, and is considered to be nineteenth-century New Zealand's greatest engineering achievement.

== Provincial growth ==
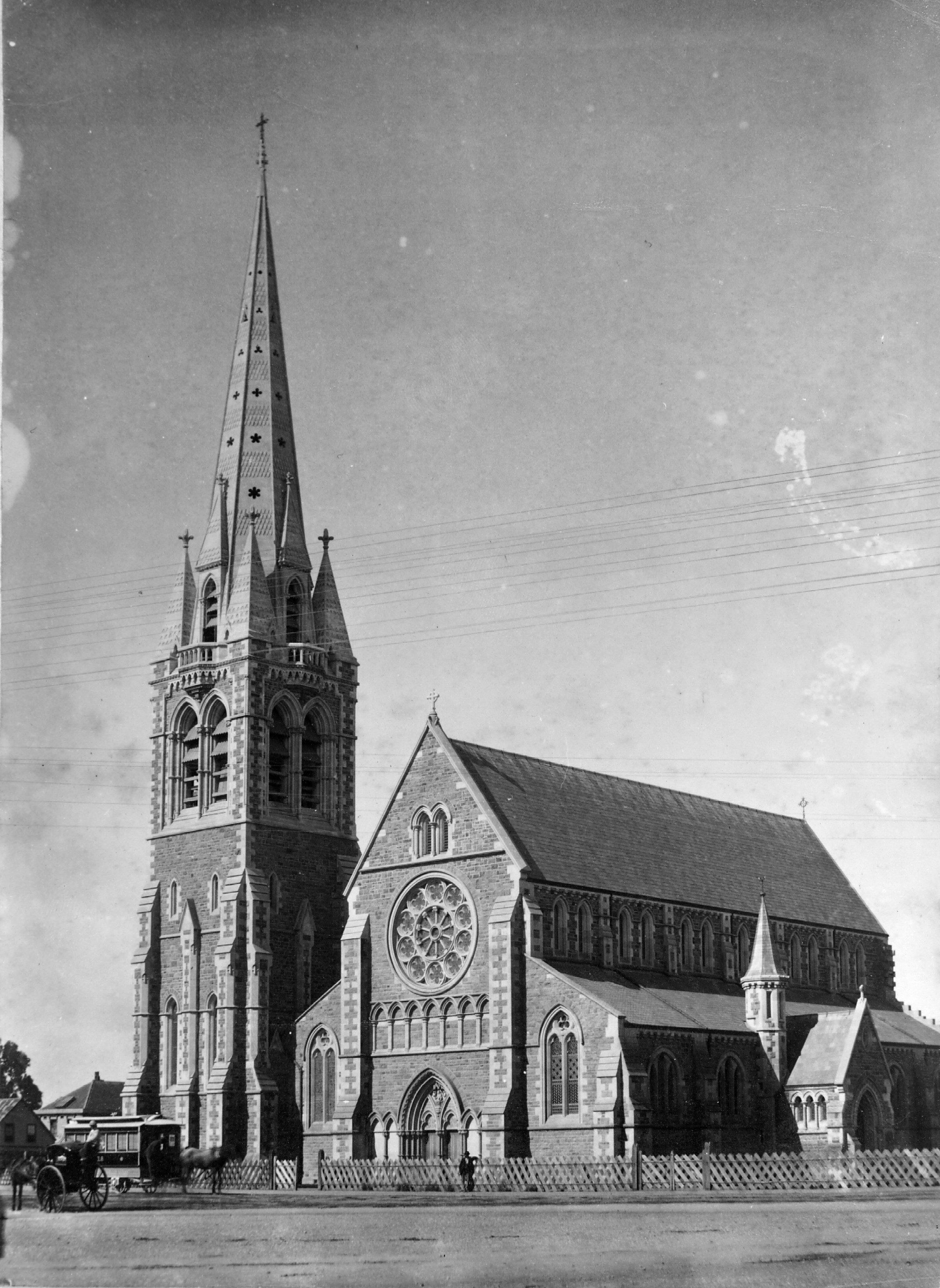
Christ Church Cathedral, with its gothic-style architecture

Between 1853 and 1876, Christchurch was the administrative seat of the Province of Canterbury. While slow at first, growth in the town began to accelerate towards the end of the 1850s, with a period of rapid growth between 1857 and 1864. Christchurch became the first city in New Zealand by royal charter on 31 July 1856, and Henry Harper was consecrated by the archbishop of Canterbury as the local Anglican bishop. He arrived in Christchurch a few months later in December 1856. In 1862 the Christchurch City Council was established. By 1874, Christchurch was New Zealand's fourth-largest city with a population of 14,270 residents. Between 1871 and 1876, nearly 20,000 immigrants arrived in Canterbury, and through the 1880s frozen meat joined wool as a primary export. The last decades of the nineteenth-century were a period of significant growth for the city, despite the national economic depression. Many of the city's stone Gothic Revival buildings by provincial architect Benjamin Mountfort date from around this period, including Canterbury University College, Christ Church Cathedral, Canterbury Museum, and the Canterbury Provincial Council Buildings, among others. Mountfort oversaw construction of a prison on Lincon Road in 1874, which operated until 1999.

Christchurch experienced a number of minor natural disasters during this period. Heavy rain caused the Waimakariri River to flood Christchurch in February 1868. Victoria Square (known as Market Place at the time) was left underwater with "the whole left side of the [Avon] river from Montreal-street bridge to Worcester street was all one lake, as deep as up to a horse's belly". Christchurch buildings were damaged by earthquakes in 1869, 1881 and 1888. The 1888 earthquake caused the highest 7.8 metres of the Christ Church Cathedral spire to collapse, many chimneys were broken, and the Durham Street Methodist Church had its stonework damaged. In November 1901, a magnitude 6.9 earthquake, centred near Cheviot, caused the spire on top of Christ Church Cathedral to collapse again, but this time only the top 1.5 metres fell. On this occasion, it was rebuilt with timber and metal instead of stone. The first fire brigade was established in Market Square 1860.

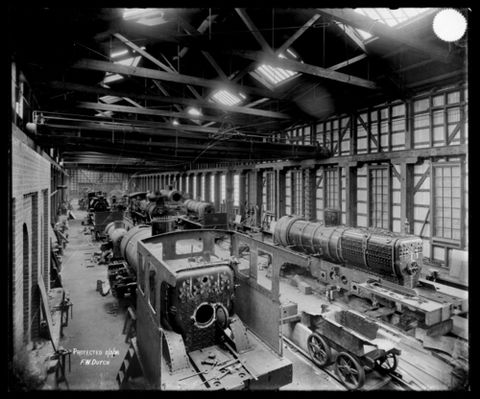
Addington Railway Workshops in 1898

Christchurch had a steam and horse-drawn tram network as early as the 1880s. Spreydon, Beckenham, Linwood, Woolston and New Brighton experienced rapid growth in the 1890s, which was enabled by public transport access. The tram network expanded in 1894, providing access to the suburb of North New Brighton. (Note: The suburb was known as North Beach at the time, North New Brighton became an official name in 1953.) The tram network began to be electrified at the start of the 20th century, with the first electric tram operating in 1905. The city started to receive a regular supply of electricity from the Lake Coleridge hydroelectric scheme in April 1915 and, as a result, the first electric lights became operational in Christchurch in May 1915.

The Catholic Cathedral of the Blessed Sacrament was opened in February 1905. It was designed by Francis Petre with inspiration from the Saint-Vincent-de-Paul in Paris. In 1906, the New Zealand International Exhibition opened in Hagley Park, which had over a million visitors. In 1908, the city experienced its first major fire which started at the Strange's Department Store and destroyed buildings in central Christchurch on High St, Cashel St and Lichfield Streets.

The city began its long history as an Antarctic gateway in 1901, when the Discovery Expedition left from Lyttelton. Robert Falcon Scott's second departure from Christchurch in 1910 would be his last; he died as part of the Terra Nova Expedition. The city mourned his death, and a memorial statue of him was unveiled in 1917.

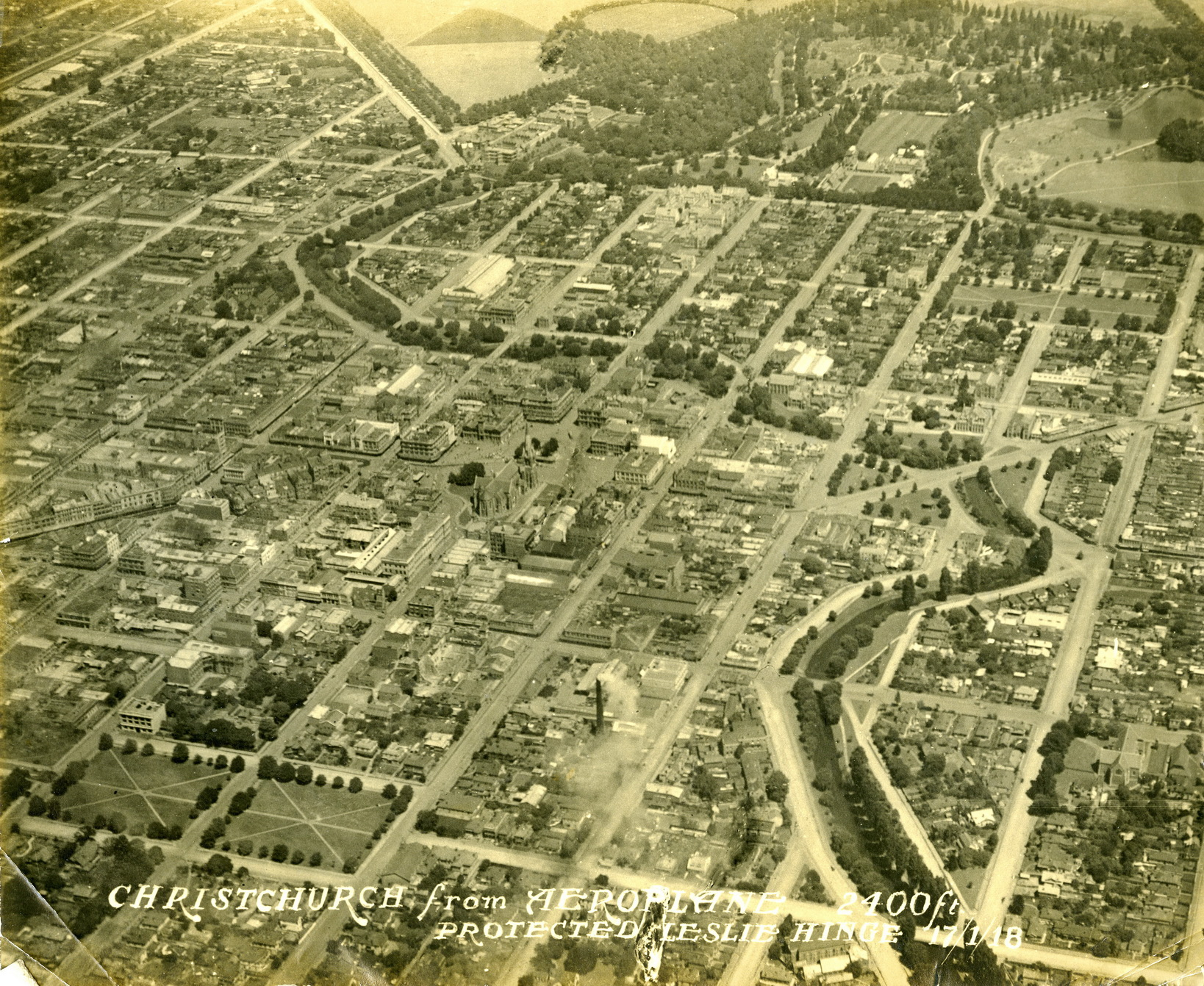
First aerial photograph of Christchurch taken by Leslie Hinge, January 1918

Between 1914 and 1918 Christchurch and the wider Canterbury region contributed nearly 24,000 troops to fight in World War I. During the war 2,739 men from the region were killed. Henry Wigram established an aerodrome in Sockburn in 1917, and by the end of the war it had trained 182 pilots. Just after the war, 458 residents of Christchurch died in the 1918 influenza pandemic. The Citizens' War Memorial was erected in Cathedral Square in 1937 to commemorate the losses from the war.

Christchurch was heavily industrialised in the early 20th century, particularly the suburbs of Woolston and Addington, with Woolston housing a large amount of New Zealand's rubber industry. Many warehouses, factories and large premises of railway workshops were built along the Main South Line. There was notable development of breweries, flour mills, and light-commercial in Christchurch. This significantly increased the population of workers in the city, which soon spread industrialisation to Sydenham. As central Christchurch grew, many cottages were demolished to make way for light-industrial and retail premises near Moorhouse Avenue as they expanded south. Many churches were also built to compensate for its growing Christian population. The population of Christchurch exceeded 100,000 for the first time in 1919.

== Mid-to-late 20th century ==
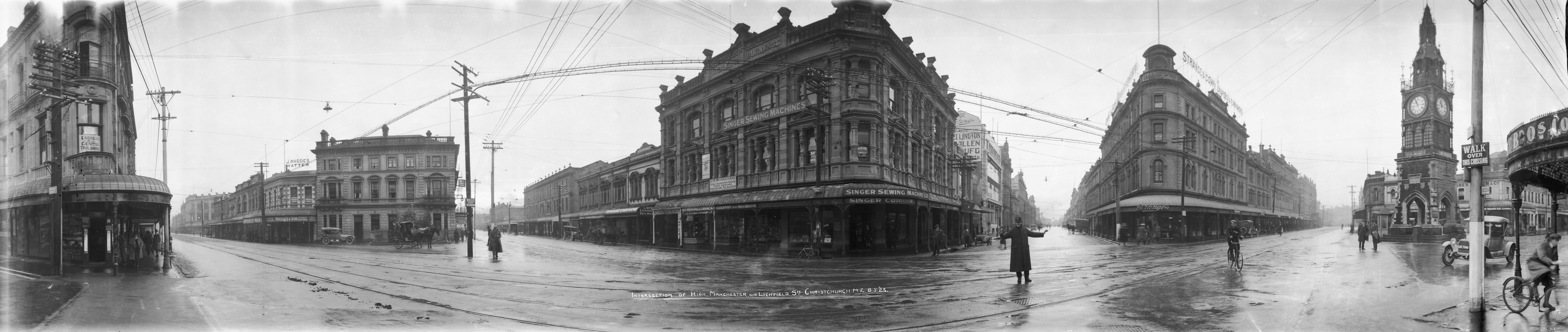
The intersection of High Street, Manchester Street and Lichfield Street in Christchurch, 1923. The Victoria Clock Tower (right) was moved to the present location on Victoria Street in 1930.

Despite the central city remaining relatively unchanged between 1914 and 1960, Christchurch grew rapidly during the 20th century in part due to the construction of many state houses. The earliest state houses were built in Sydenham in the 1900s, to house workers that were employed in nearby factories, with more houses built in 1909 near the Addington Railway Workshops. The building programme continued during the middle years of the century.

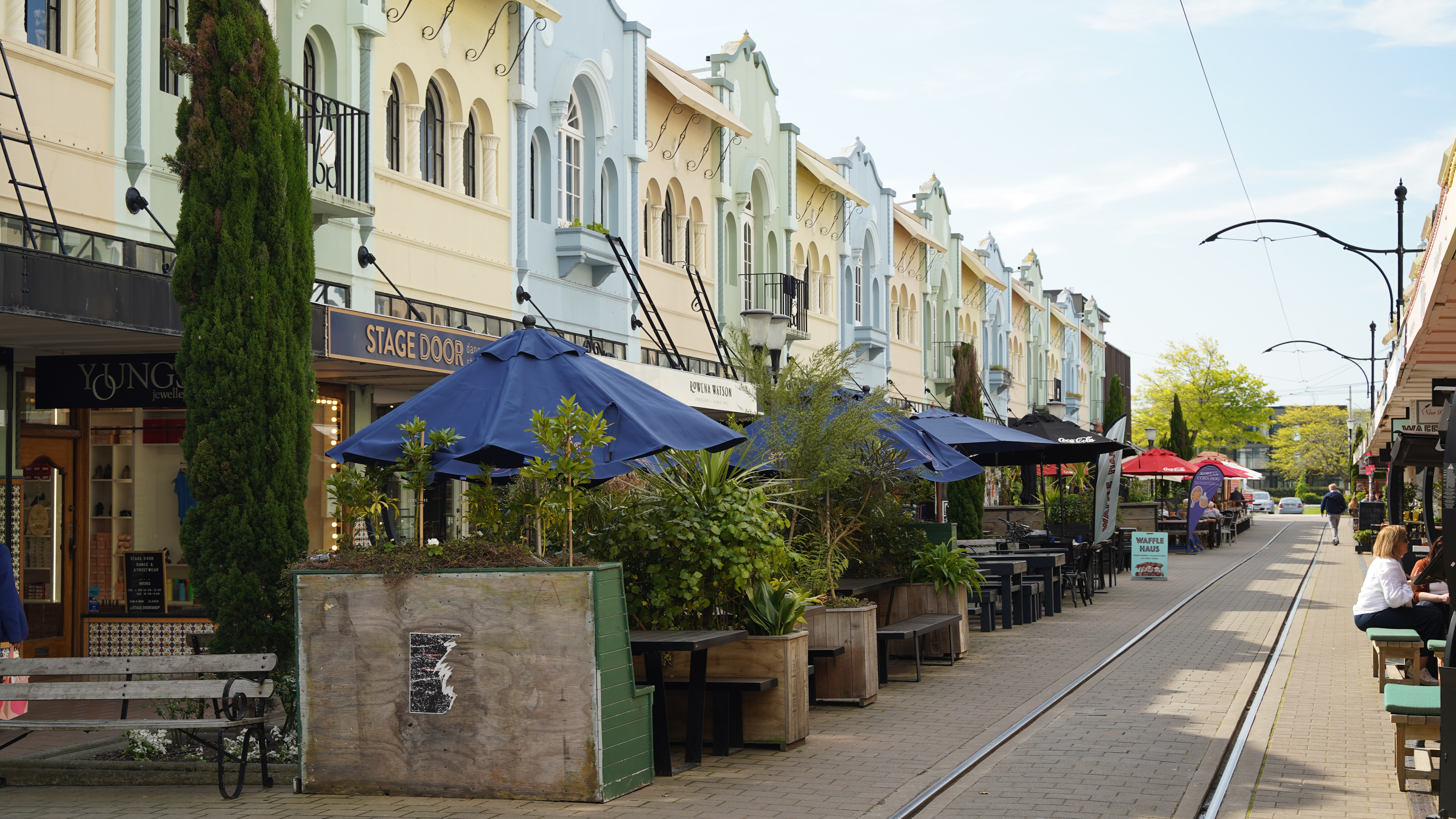
The New Regent Street development opened in 1932

The first public radio service in Christchurch — 3YA — was established in 1926; New Zealand's first live sports radio broadcast was made from Christchurch later that year. The first set of traffic lights was installed in Christchurch in 1930 at the intersection of Cashel and Colombo Streets. During the Great Depression, Christchurch along with all of the major centres experienced widespread unemployment. Union demonstrations — most notably organised by the Tramways Union — resulted in violence with police on several occasions. The local economy bounced back during the later half of the 1930s in part thanks to textile and food exports. Despite the economic downturn, in 1932 the private New Regent Street development was opened by Dan Sullivan. This was an entire street of terrace shops designed in the Spanish Mission style.

While initially well-isolated from the direct impacts of World War II, the entrance of the Empire of Japan into the Pacific War and the attack on Pearl Harbor in the early 1940s resulted in fear of a Japanese invasion of New Zealand. Though this never eventuated, Christchurch prepared by digging air raid shelters and enforcing night-time blackouts. Tunnels for storing fuel oil were dug in Lyttelton (though they were never completed), and anti-aircraft batteries were established at Godley Head and other locations in Lyttelton Harbour. Harewood Airport opened for flying in 1940, but was quickly co-opted to become a Royal New Zealand Air Force base. After the war this was developed over a number of years to become Christchurch International Airport, and in 1950 it was New Zealand's first international airport.

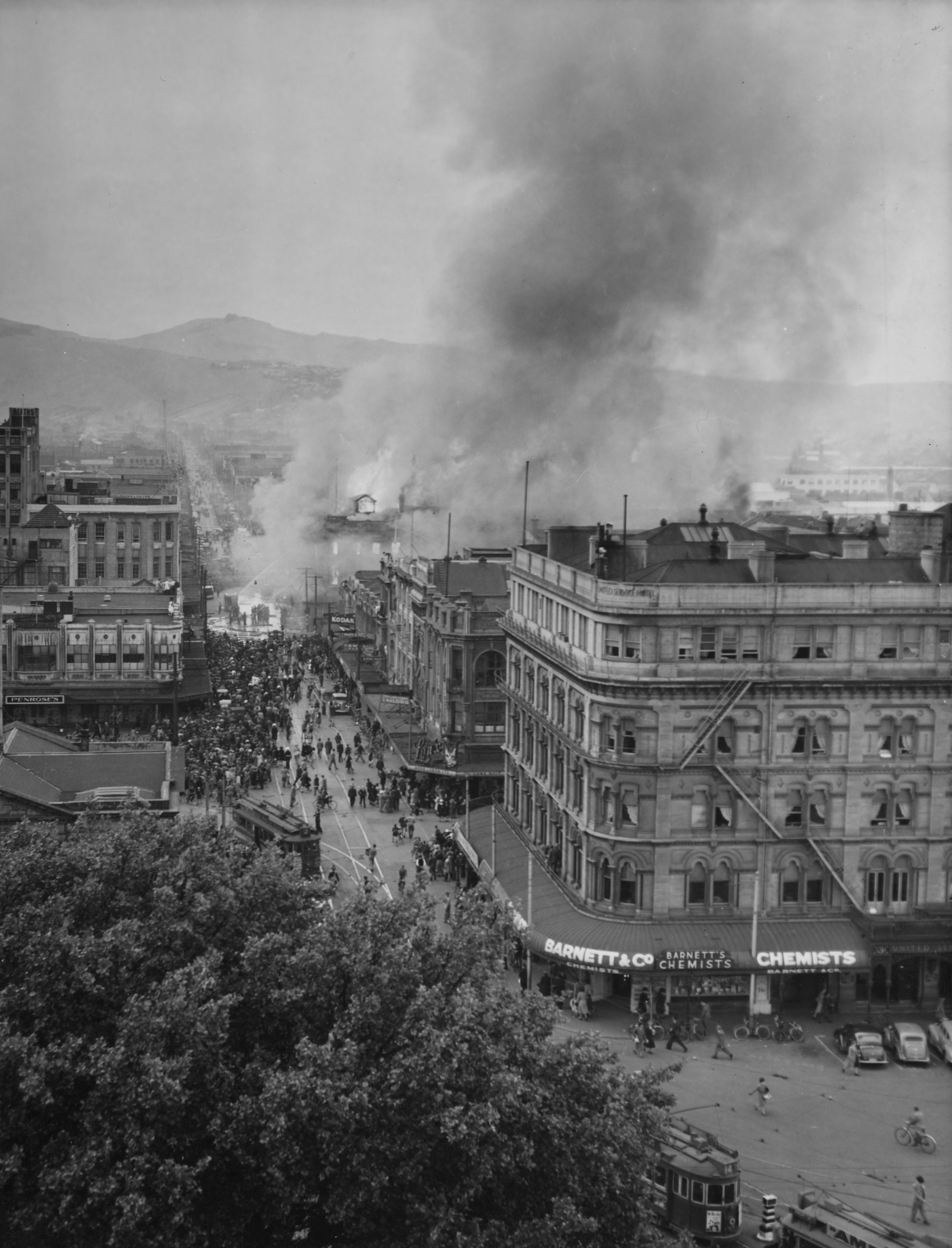
The Ballantynes Fire as viewed from the tower of Christ Church Cathedral

In November 1947, a basement fire at the Ballantynes department store on the corner of Cashel and Colombo Streets unexpectedly burned out of control, resulting in New Zealand's worst fire disaster. Despite being initially thought to be under control, the fire suddenly spread to the upper floors and consumed the entire building within minutes. The speed of the fire trapped 41 staff members on the upper floor, all of which were killed. The department store was actually a combination of seven or eight different buildings, joined together to form a "perplexing maze" with no sprinklers or alarm system. A subsequent Royal commission of enquiry resulted in changes to the building code to improve fire safety. Thousands of mourners, including the Prime Minister, attended a mass funeral in the aftermath.

In 1954 Elizabeth II visited Christchurch, becoming the first and only reigning monarch to visit the city. Later that year the Parker–Hulme murder case grabbed headlines, with the youth of the murderers shocking the public. The case was later adapted by Peter Jackson into the 1994 film Heavenly Creatures, which was also filmed in Christchurch. The last electric tram route closed in 1956; this would later be revived in the mid 1990s as a tourist attraction. In November 1957, a Bristol Freighter crashed into the Russley Golf Course, killing the two crew and two passengers on board. In December 1957, Christchurch was affected by a one in 100 year flooding event, with the Waimakariri River bursting its stop banks near the suburb of Belfast.

During the 1960s Christchurch experienced urban sprawl, with much of the retail business of the central city moving out to suburban shopping malls. These typically included large car parking areas to suit the growing shift towards personal car ownership, and away from public transport. Riccarton Mall was the first major mall to open in November 1965, with Northlands Shopping Centre in Papanui following in November 1967. Hornby became a significant industrial suburb in the 1960s, with industrial and residential premises expanding westwards.

The Lyttelton road tunnel between Lyttelton and Christchurch was opened in 1964. Television broadcasts began in Christchurch on 1 June 1961 with the launch of channel CHTV3, making Christchurch the second New Zealand city to receive regular television broadcasts. The channel initially broadcast from a 10-kilowatt transmitter atop the Gloucester Street studios until it switched to the newly built 100-kilowatt Sugarloaf transmitter in the Port Hills on 28 August 1965. In 1969, the one-way system running through central Christchurch was established. The first two streets to be made one-way were Lichfield and St Asaph streets. They were followed by Barbadoes, Madras, Salisbury and Kilmore streets. A police station opened in 1973 on Hereford street; it was imploded in 2015 due to earthquake damage.

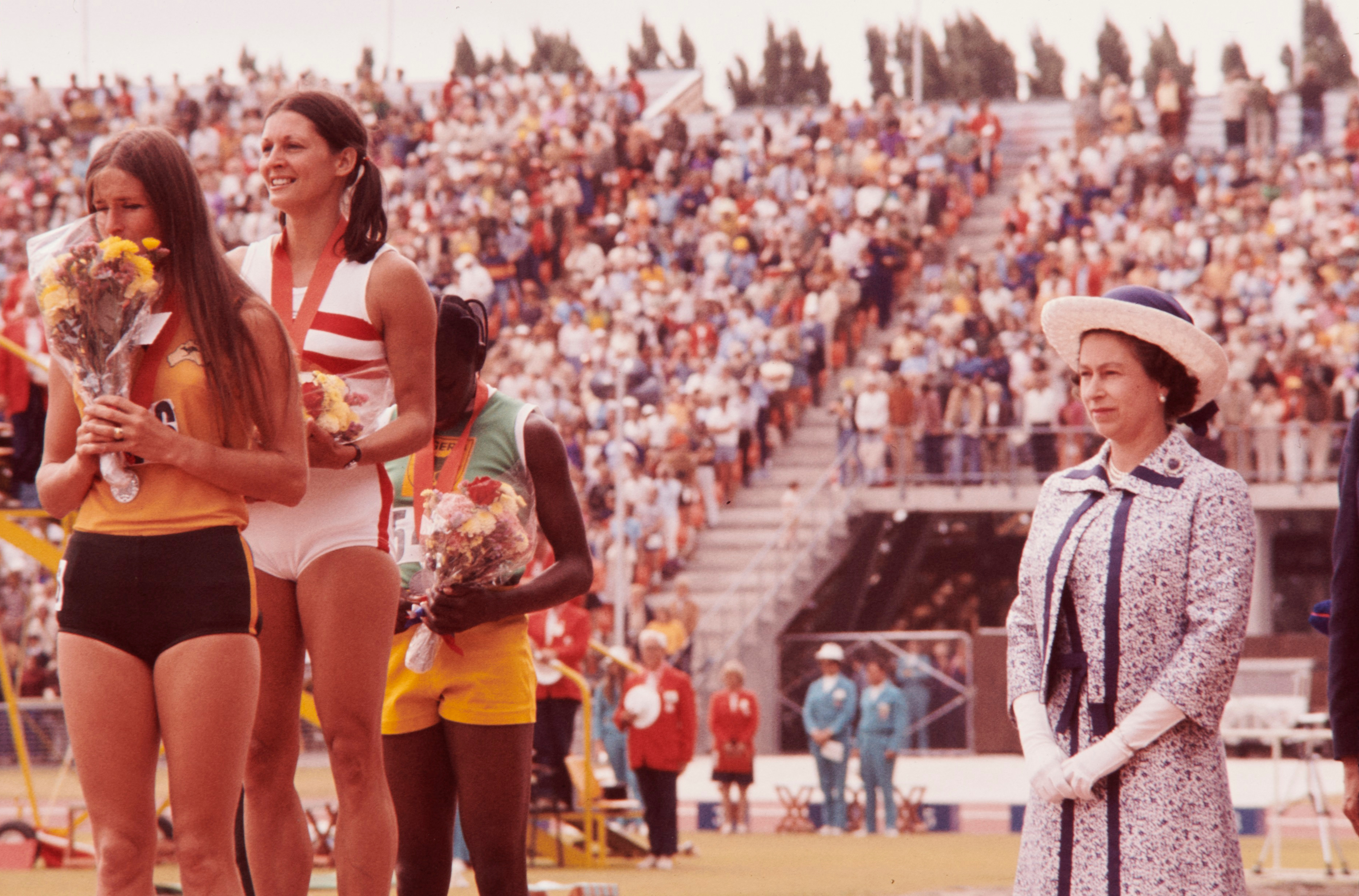
Queen Elizabeth II and various sportspeople at the 1974 Commonwealth Games

Christchurch hosted the 1974 British Commonwealth Games at the purpose-built Queen Elizabeth II Park. The sports complex was open in 1973, one year before the games.

The Al-Noor Mosque was opened in 1985, this being the second in the country. Christchurch had a small Muslim community at the time, but then grew after small groups of Iraqis and Iranians settled in the city. Christchurch saw an increasing number of immigrants in the 1990s, increasing its ethnic diversity. Most immigrants were Asian, most prominently settling in Avonhead.

Christchurch had its own regional television station Canterbury Television. CTV was first formed in 1991 and ceased broadcasting on 16 December 2016. Christchurch was hit by the biggest snowstorm in 30 years in August 1992, which left snow up to a foot deep in some parts of Christchurch. In the wider Canterbury area, more than one million sheep had died as a result of the snow and cold conditions.

== Recent history ==
=== 2010–2012 earthquake sequence ===
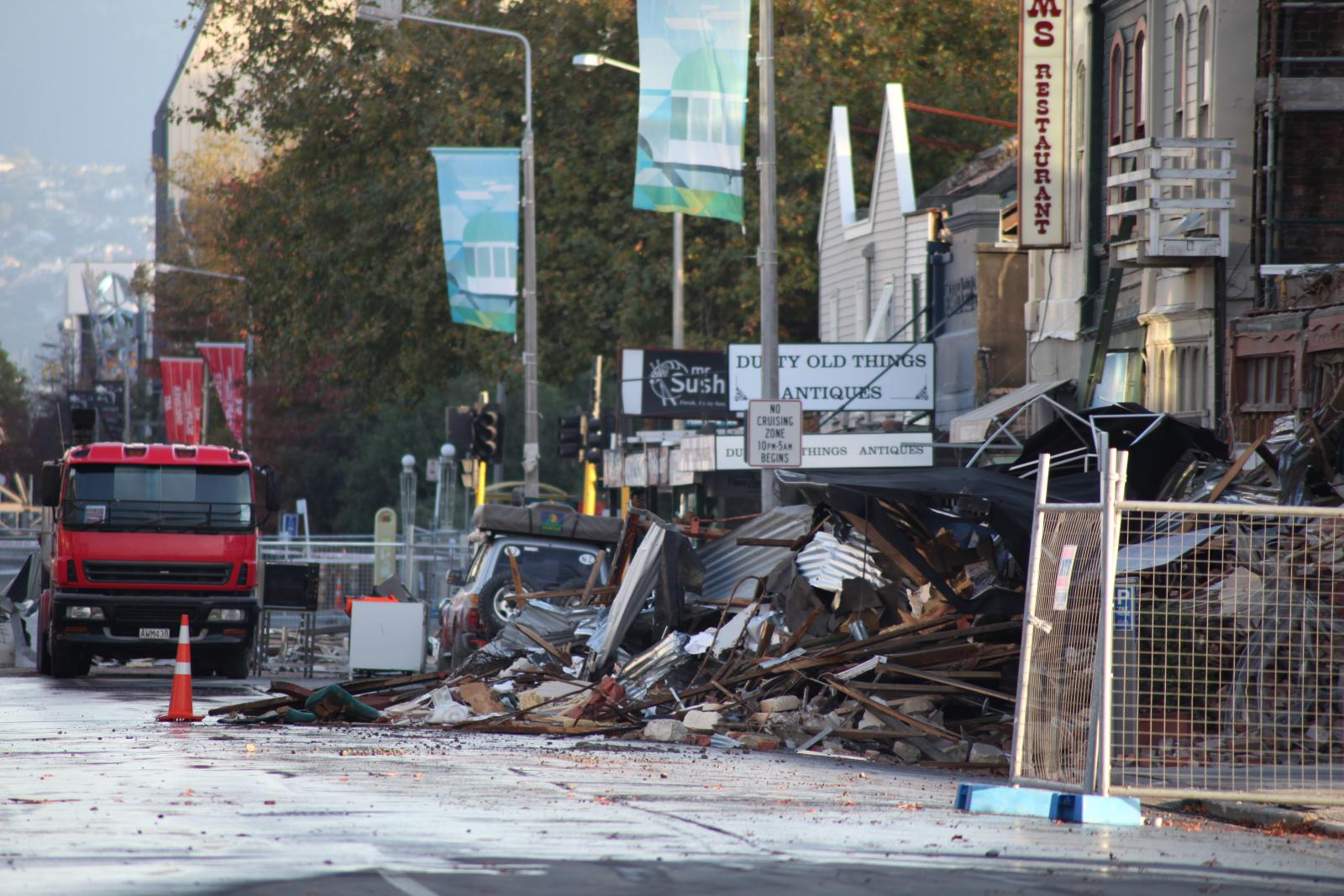
Aftermath of the February 2011 earthquake on Colombo Street

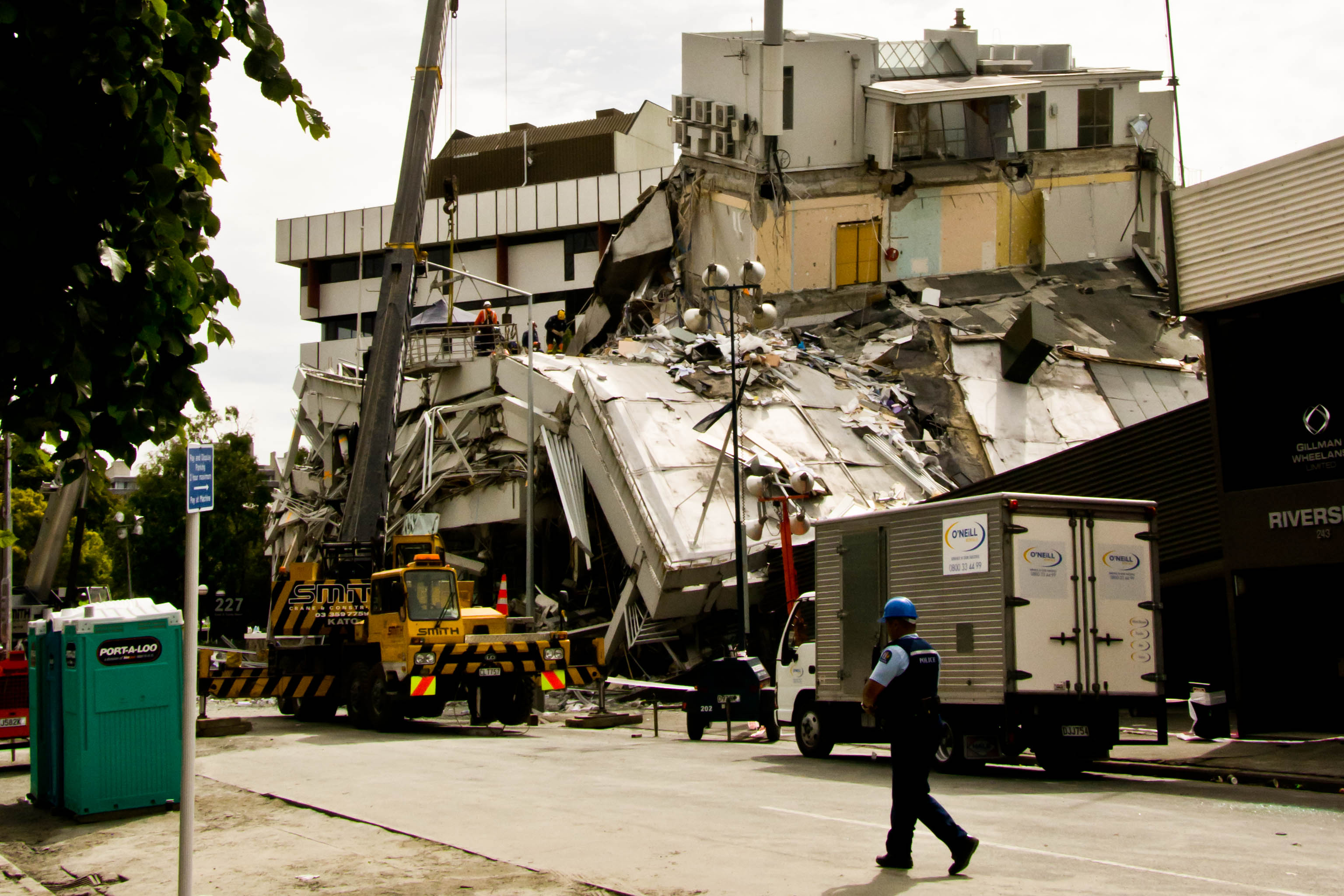
The collapsed PGC Building. Thirty of the building's two hundred workers were trapped within the building following the February 2011 earthquake.

On Saturday, 4 September 2010, a magnitude 7.1 earthquake struck Christchurch and the central Canterbury region at 4:35 am. With its epicentre near Darfield, west of the city at a depth of 10 kilometres (6.2 mi), it caused widespread damage to the city and minor injuries, but no direct fatalities.

Nearly six months later, on Tuesday 22 February 2011, a second earthquake measuring magnitude 6.3 struck the city at 12:51 pm. Its epicentre was located closer to the city, near Lyttelton, at a depth of 5 km (3 mi).

Although lower on the moment magnitude scale than the previous earthquake, the intensity and violence of the ground shaking was measured to be IX (Violent), among the strongest ever recorded globally in an urban area, which killed 185 people. The city's Christ Church Cathedral was severely damaged and lost its spire. The collapse of the CTV Building resulted in the majority of fatalities. Widespread damage across Christchurch resulted in the loss of homes, major buildings and infrastructure. Significant liquefaction affected the eastern suburbs, and the total cost to insurers of rebuilding has been estimated at NZ$20–30 billion.

There were continuing aftershocks for some time, with 4,558 above a magnitude 3.0 recorded in the Canterbury region from 4 September 2010 to 3 September 2014. Particularly large events on 13 June 2011, 23 December 2011, and 2 January 2012, caused further damage and minor injuries, but no further deaths. By September 2013, over 1500 buildings in the city had been demolished or partly demolished.

=== 2017 Port Hills fires ===
On 13 February 2017, two bush fires started on the Port Hills. These merged over the next two days and the single very large wildfire extended down both sides of the Port Hill almost reaching Governors Bay in the south-west, and the Westmorland, Kennedys Bush, and Dyers Pass Road almost down to the Sign of the Takahe. Eleven houses were destroyed by fire, over one thousand residents were evacuated from their homes, and over 2,076 hectares (5,130 acres) of land was burned.

=== 2019 terrorist attack ===
On 15 March 2019, an Australian white supremacist carried out two consecutive mass shootings at Al Noor Mosque and Linwood Islamic Centre, killing fifty-one people. Forty others were injured. The attacks have been described by Prime Minister Jacinda Ardern as "one of New Zealand's darkest days". On 2 June 2020, the attacker pleaded guilty to multiple charges of murder, attempted murder, and terrorism. On 27 August, he was sentenced to life in prison without parole, the first time such a sentence was handed down in New Zealand.

== See also ==
- History of Canterbury, New Zealand
