= Avonside =

Suburb of Christchurch, New Zealand

- Suburb
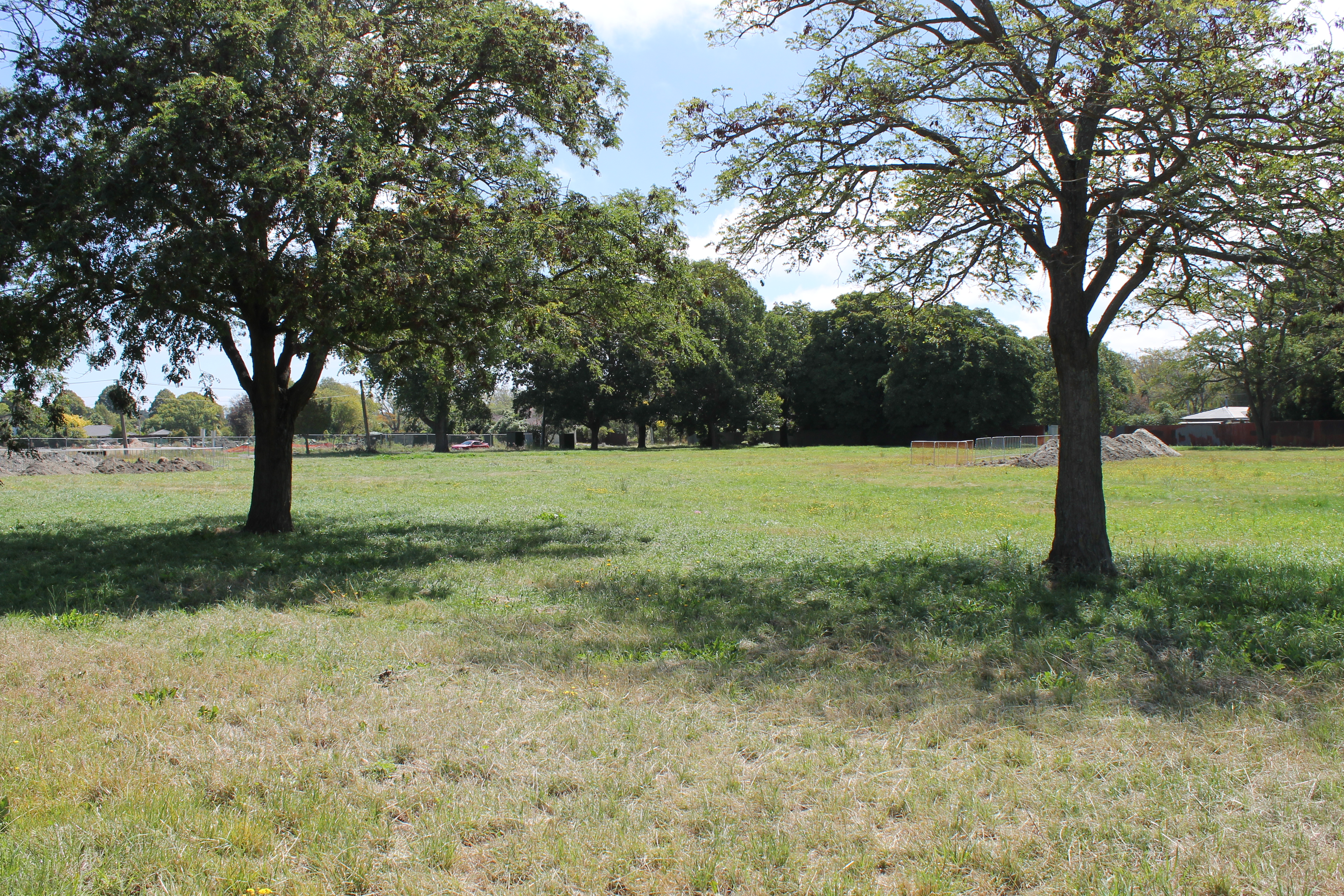
- Sullivan Park in Avonside
- Interactive map of Avonside
- Coordinates: 43.523°S 172.673°E
- Country: New Zealand
- City: Christchurch
- Local authority: Christchurch City Council
- Electoral ward: Burwood; Linwood
- Community board: Waitai Coastal-Burwood-Linwood

Area
  - Land: 81 ha (200 acres)

Population (June 2025)
  - Total: 1,840
  - Density: 2,300/km^{2} (5,900/sq mi)

	(Residential red zone)
Richmond	Avonside	Wainoni
	Linwood

Avonside is an eastern suburb in Christchurch, New Zealand. It is one of the oldest suburbs of the city, with only Heathcote being older.

== History ==
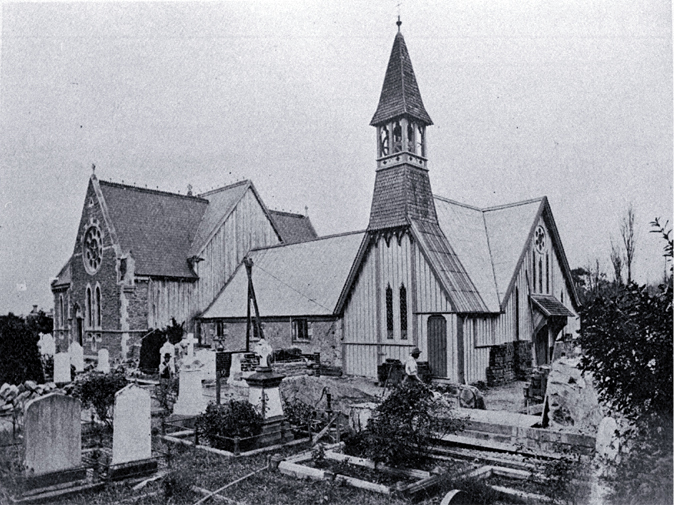
Holy Trinity Avonside, 1905

The Avonside district was first mentioned in the Lyttelton times as a local district by Bishop Selwyn in 1855. The newly established parish in Avonside built a church dedicated to the Holy Trinity and the church and burial grounds were consecrated on 24 February 1857. Avonside was home to Avonside Girls' High School. It also has the Avon River / Ōtākaro flowing through it.

The boundaries of the original Anglican parish of Avonside were fixed in 1859 and covered much of what is now suburbs such as Aranui, Burwood, Linwood, Marshland, New Brighton, North New Brighton, Parklands and part of Phillipstown. The area once covered the whole of north east Christchurch as far as the Styx River.

The area borders the Avon River / Ōtākaro and is built on the rich soils of the Avon River flood plain. In the early years of Christchurch the area was known to be extremely swampy and difficult to travel across.

== Earthquakes ==
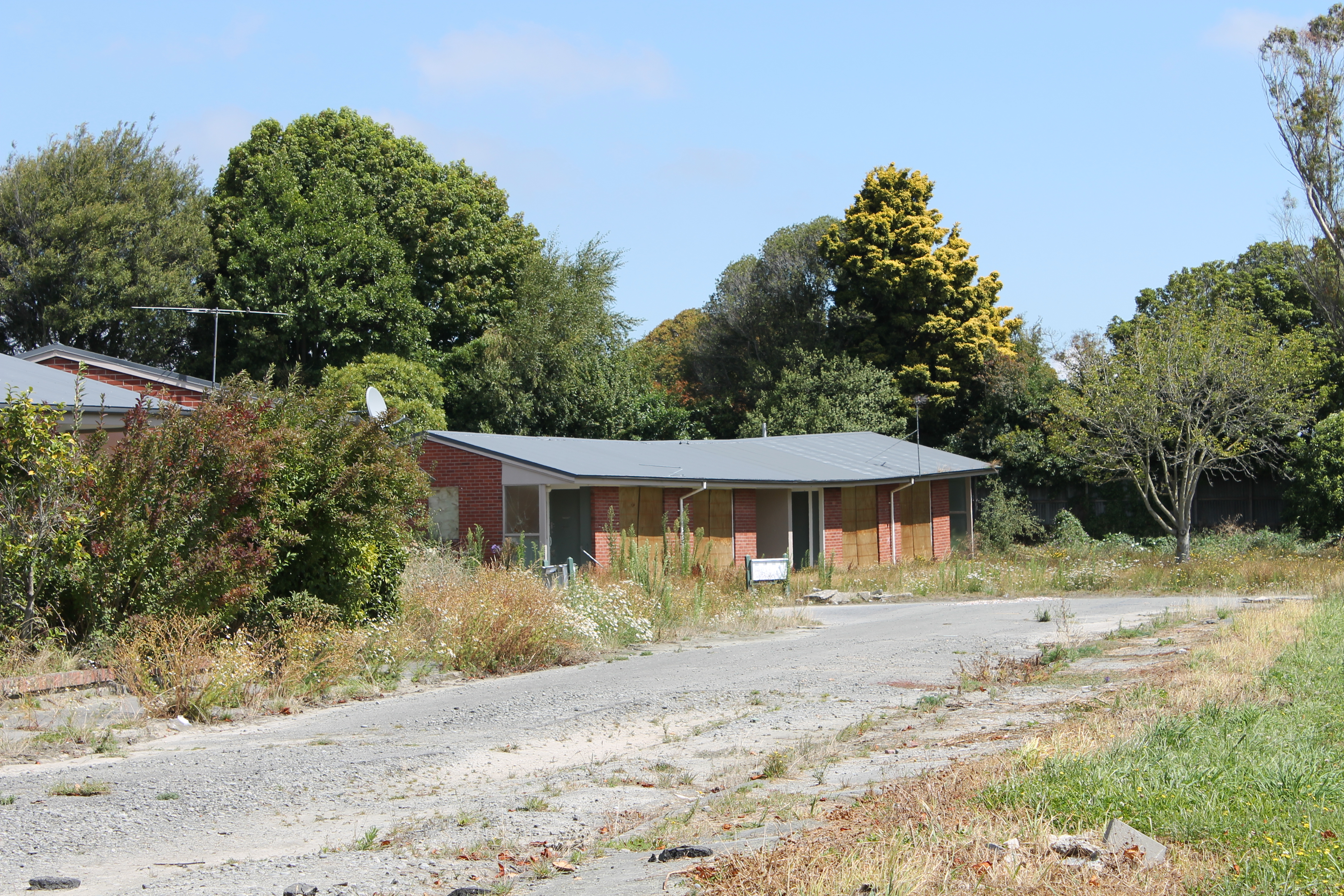
Christchurch City Council housing units in Bowie Place prior to demolition in February 2014

During the 4 September 2010 Canterbury earthquake, Avonside suffered a large amount of liquefaction. In particular Keller Street, Bracken Street, Retreat Road and Cowlishaw Street were left with large areas covered in water and grey silt. Avonside Drive also experienced a great deal of damage with cracked roads and buildings. Power and water were lost, in some cases for several days, and there was extensive damage to the sewer system.

The more devastating 22 February 2011 Christchurch earthquake further damaged infrastructure and houses in the suburb. Liquefaction and flooding was more prominent than in September, along with the damage to roads, and many houses were more severely damaged along with the land they were built on. Power was lost for two to three weeks for many residents and for most houses the sewer infrastructure needed to be replaced or repaired. The New Zealand Army and many other volunteer organisations based in Christchurch (especially the Student Volunteer Army and the Farmy Army) helped residents remove silt from their sections because of the sheer volume, with many streets having large mounds piled up on the side of the road. Local electorate MP Brendon Burns, in association with local community leaders, hosted meetings at Retreat Park (a local park on the corner of Retreat Road and Patten Street) to inform residents of necessary information such as the provision of water and progress of power being re-connected.

Another aftershock struck in June causing liquefaction and flooding along with damaging houses and the infrastructure of the suburb even more. Later in the month the New Zealand Government announced (along with other suburbs in Christchurch) that many homes in Avonside were part of the so-called Red Zone and would be demolished due to the land being too badly damaged to rebuild or repair a house in the near future. Many streets were affected by this decision and residents had until April 2013 to vacate their homes and accept compensation deals that are being offered by both the government and insurance companies for land and house. Other areas of the suburb were placed in the city's Green Zone where insurance companies could begin repair or rebuild of damaged properties. Many sections and houses in the suburb (mainly on Patten Street, Retreat Road and Cowlishaw Street) remained in limbo while the New Zealand government decided whether their land could be remediated or not. This was referred to as the Orange Zone. These decisions have since been made.

== Demographics ==
Avonside covers 0.81 km^{2} (0.31 sq mi). It had an estimated population of 1,840 as of June 2025, with a population density of 2,272 people per km^{2}.

Historical population
Year	Pop.	±% p.a.
2006	1,899	—
2013	1,695	−1.61%
2018	1,671	−0.28%
2023	1,719	+0.57%

Avonside had a population of 1,719 in the 2023 New Zealand census, an increase of 48 people (2.9%) since the 2018 census, and an increase of 24 people (1.4%) since the 2013 census. There were 870 males, 828 females, and 18 people of other genders in 702 dwellings. 5.9% of people identified as LGBTIQ+. The median age was 36.1 years (compared with 38.1 years nationally). There were 336 people (19.5%) aged under 15 years, 339 (19.7%) aged 15 to 29, 819 (47.6%) aged 30 to 64, and 225 (13.1%) aged 65 or older.

People could identify as more than one ethnicity. The results were 73.1% European (Pākehā); 21.3% Māori; 12.4% Pasifika; 9.9% Asian; 1.7% Middle Eastern, Latin American and African New Zealanders (MELAA); and 1.9% other, which includes people giving their ethnicity as "New Zealander". English was spoken by 94.4%, Māori by 5.8%, Samoan by 5.2%, and other languages by 9.9%. No language could be spoken by 2.8% (e.g. too young to talk). New Zealand Sign Language was known by 0.7%. The percentage of people born overseas was 19.5, compared with 28.8% nationally.

Religious affiliations were 31.4% Christian, 1.0% Hindu, 1.6% Islam, 0.5% Māori religious beliefs, 0.5% Buddhist, 0.7% New Age, and 0.9% other religions. People who answered that they had no religion were 55.5%, and 7.9% of people did not answer the census question.

Of those at least 15 years old, 207 (15.0%) people had a bachelor's or higher degree, 750 (54.2%) had a post-high school certificate or diploma, and 426 (30.8%) people exclusively held high school qualifications. The median income was $30,200, compared with $41,500 nationally. 45 people (3.3%) earned over $100,000 compared to 12.1% nationally. The employment status of those at least 15 was 618 (44.7%) full-time, 156 (11.3%) part-time, and 84 (6.1%) unemployed.

== Education ==
Avonside Girls' High School opened in Avonside in 1919, but the site suffered earthquake damage in 2011. The school moved to North New Brighton in 2019.
