= December 2011 Christchurch earthquakes =

Earthquakes in New Zealand

- Location within New Zealand
- UTC time: 2011-12-23 00:58:38
- ISC event: 600091705
- USGS-ANSS: ComCat
- Local date: 23 December 2011
- Local time: 1.58 pm NZDT (UTC+13)
- Magnitude: M_{w} 5.8
- Depth: 10 km (6 mi)
- Epicentre: 43.48°S 172.8°E
- Areas affected: Christchurch, New Zealand
- Total damage: >NZ$15 million
- Max. intensity: MMI VII (Very strong)
- Casualties: 1 fatality (indirect), 60 injuries

On 23 December 2011, a magnitude 5.8 earthquake struck east of Christchurch, New Zealand, at 1.58 pm. Within the next two hours it was followed by magnitude 5.0, 5.4 and 5.9 earthquakes. These earthquakes caused liquefaction and flooding in the eastern suburbs, as well as about 60 injuries and one indirect death due to tripping on ground that had become uneven. The Earthquake Commission received over 48,000 damage claims and paid out $15.4 million by September 2012. These earthquakes occurred after the city had been devastated by an earthquake in February 2011, which caused 185 deaths and tens of billion dollars in damage.

== Background ==
A magnitude 7.1 M_{w} earthquake, known as the Darfield earthquake, occurred on 4 September 2010, and had, at the time, the biggest ground shaking ever to be recorded in New Zealand, at 1.26 g (1.26 times the acceleration of gravity). The Darfield quake occurred along the Greendale Fault, and had thousands of shallow aftershocks over the coming months. Most occurred along the fault's surface trace, but there was also a zone of aftershocks extending northwards from the middle of the fault trace, as well as beyond the western and eastern (towards Christchurch) sides. Most aftershocks were under magnitude 3 and did not cause significant damage, however a few did, including the M_{w} 4.7 2010 Boxing Day earthquake quake and the M_{w} 6.2 22 February 2011 earthquake. The February earthquake was the most destructive of them all, causing 185 deaths and tens of billion dollars in damage. A M_{w} 6.0 earthquake in June 2011 followed and caused further damage.

== Earthquakes ==
The earthquakes occurred on 23 December, offshore, east of Christchurch, on faults under Pegasus Bay.

- Magnitude 5.8 at 1.58 pm, depth of 10 kilometres (6.2 mi).
- Magnitude 5.0 at 2.00 pm, depth of 8 kilometres (5.0 mi).
- Magnitude 5.4 at 2.06 pm, depth of 7 kilometres (4.3 mi).
- Magnitude 5.9 at 3.18 pm, depth of 7 kilometres (4.3 mi).

== Damage and effects ==
The earthquakes caused sewage outflows, including into the Avon River / Ōtākaro, which led to the encouragement of residents to keep away from the Avon Heathcote Estuary, city beaches and rivers. The earthquakes also caused liquefaction, with the eastern suburbs being most affected. Liquefaction and flooding was worst in Avondale, Bexley, Burwood, New Brighton and Parklands. Parklands also lost sewerage and water supply. The liquefaction resulted in the closure of roads in the eastern suburbs and ones close to the central city.

The earthquake at 1.58 pm caused 26,000 properties to lose electricity. Power was restored to almost all of them by the next day. The telecommunications network became strained and residents were encouraged to communicate using text message instead of calling. People travelling home caused the roads to become gridlocked. A magnitude 4.3 earthquake the next day at 1.21 am broke a water pipe, which had to be turned off in order to be repaired. This resulted in homes in Redcliffs and Sumner losing mains water supply. It was restored by the afternoon. As a precautionary measure, Christchurch Hospital and Princess Margaret Hospital used boiled water. Burwood Hospital had to run on backup power, and temporarily move its birthing unit.

Cliffs near Boulder Bay on Banks Peninsula collapsed. An uninjured family was rescued from the area by surf lifesavers via inflatable raft. The quake caused rock fall to occur from the Port Hills. Rock fall occurred in the suburbs of Sumner and Redcliffs, but the worst of it hit shipping containers used as protection against rock fall. The rock fall was not serious and did not immediately appear to affect any properties that had not been abandoned. Because of the rock fall, residents were encouraged by police to keep away from the suburbs in the hills.

After the earthquake at 1.58 pm, the ambulance service St John received approximately 140 emergency calls, and treated about 60 patients for issues that included falls, cardiac symptoms and anxiety attacks. One person died after tripping over ground that had become uneven due to the earthquake.

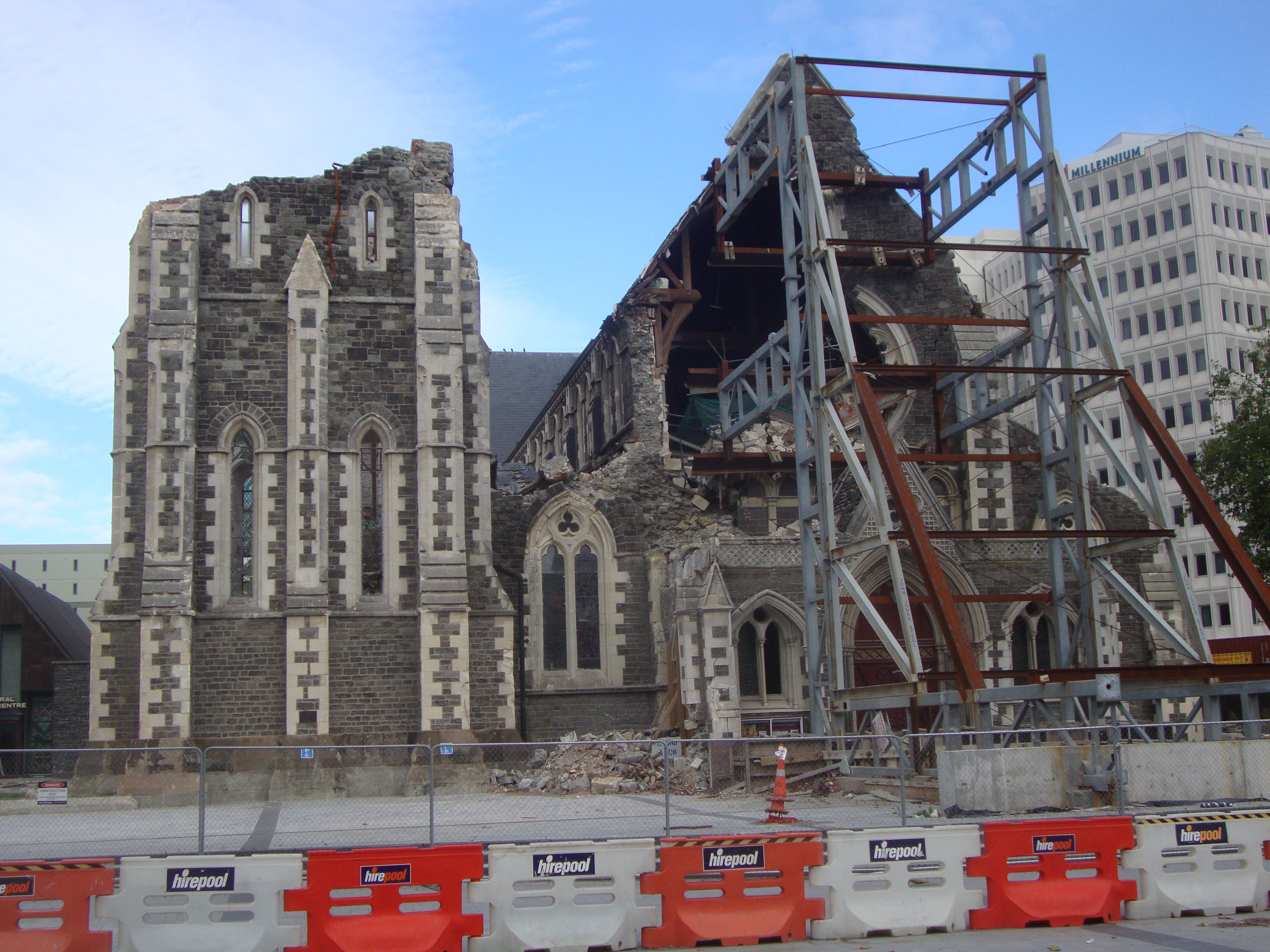
Christ Church Cathedral five days before the December 2011 earthquake

An unoccupied house collapsed, as well as a partially demolished building. A staircase in the Forsyth Barr Building collapsed; staircases in that building had already collapsed and had been damaged in the February earthquake. Minor damage occurred in the Christchurch Arts Centre. The rose window of Christ Church Cathedral, which had already been seriously damaged by the previous earthquakes, collapsed. The cathedral's western wall experienced more damage. The Hornby Clocktower building was "badly damaged" and had to be demolished in 2014. Two of the Terrace on the Park apartment buildings suffered major damage, resulting in the complex being urgently demolished February 2012. In March 2012, the damage at the University of Canterbury was estimated to be $1 million. In total, the Earthquake Commission received over 48,000 damage claims and paid out $15.4 million by September 2012.

== Response ==
A state of emergency was declared in Canterbury and the National Crisis Management Centre was activated but was soon stood down. The City Council set up an Emergency Operations Centre in the city. The council temporarily closed all of its properties. The council's civic offices on Hereford St was reopened on 10 January after it had to undergo "minor repairs". Property owners were encouraged by Canterbury Earthquake Recovery Minister Gerry Brownlee and CERA executive Roger Sutton to re-check their buildings for damage. The Student Volunteer Army helped to clean up the liquefaction.

Christchurch Airport was evacuated on the day of the earthquakes and was closed for inspections. No runway damage was found but "the terminal buildings were cleared of any damage". Flights continued at 6 pm. All the city's shopping centres were temporarily closed and evacuated as a precautionary measure. Some retailers experienced revenue losses because they were unable to open or had delays opening on Christmas Eve, one of the busiest trading days of the year. The Palms did not re-open that day.

On 26 December, Prime Minister John Key said that "What we can conclude is that the most significant damage from the earthquakes is really the psychological damage and the impact on the confidence of the people of the Christchurch."
