= Hornby Clocktower =

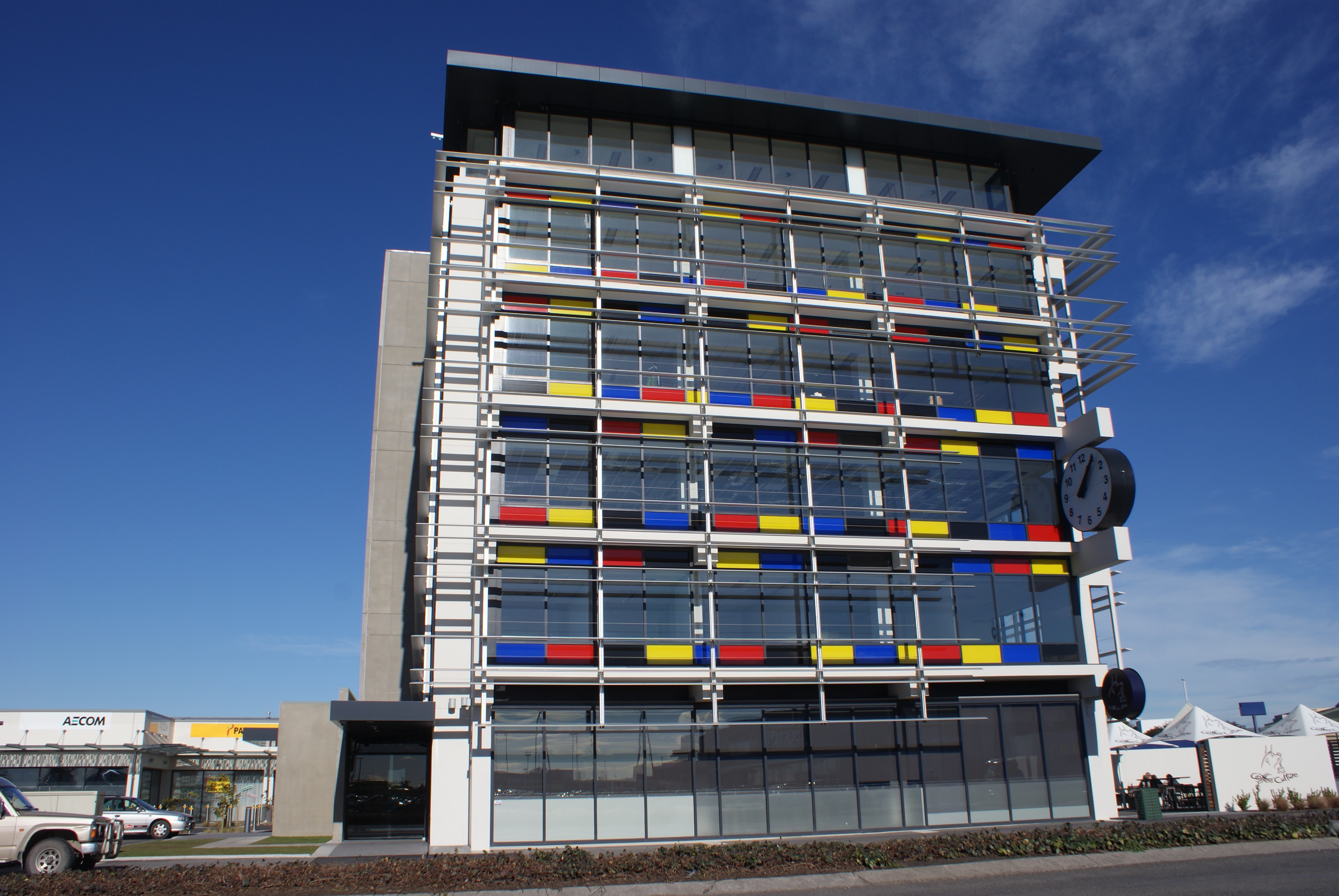
- The Hornby Clocktower in 2011
- Interactive map of the Hornby Clocktower area
- Alternative names: Hornby Clock Tower

General information
- Location: Hornby, New Zealand
- Coordinates: 43°32′36″S 172°31′40″E
- Year built: 1960s
- Renovated: 2010
- Destroyed: December 2011
- Demolished: August - October 2014

Design and construction
- Architect: Don Donnithorne

Renovating team
- Renovating firm: Wilson and Hill Architects
- Awards and prizes: 2011 Canterbury Architecture Award in Commercial Architecture

The Hornby Clocktower (also known as the Hornby Clock Tower or simply as the clock tower to local residents) was an iconic Christchurch building, situated in the suburb of Hornby on New Zealand State Highway 1. It marked the southern entrance to Christchurch for over 50 years.

The building was one of the tallest non-industrial structures in Hornby, a primarily low-rise area of Christchurch. Designed in the 1960s by architect Don Donnithorne, it was originally home to the Central Canterbury Electric Power Board.

In the late 2000s the building was redesigned by architectural firm Wilson and Hill, a project managed by Epoch Property, winning the 2011 Canterbury Architecture Award for best commercial building. The new design was intended to modernise the building, with five floors of leased office space and a ground floor used for retail. It shared its location with a strip mall which was not attached to the tower.

Following the full refurbishment, much of the tower went unused. Only the ground floor was leased to tenants, in part due to delays imposed by the 2010 Canterbury earthquake. A few months later, the building was damaged in the 2011 Christchurch earthquake and subsequent aftershocks, and was permanently closed by December.

Epoch Property claimed that repairs would not be financially viable, and proceeded with demolition in 2014. The entire tower structure was removed by October, however the strip mall survived. The land was reused to build a Carl's Jr. fast food restaurant.

== History ==
=== Original construction and tenants ===
The original incarnation of the building was constructed some time during the 1960s, and was designed by Don Donnithorne. During its early usage, it was home to the Central Canterbury Electric Power Board, and later had a mix of tenants.

In 1972, Hornby Library was founded when rooms were made available in the tower. It began with a collection of 8000 books and operated from the tower until 1975.

In 1999, the building was home to SeniorNet Garden City, a defunct organisation offering computer tuition to older people.

The bottom floor of the tower housed The Clock bar accessible from 1 Brynley Street. It had pool tables and a gaming lounge. It occupied the ground floor area until the tower was refurbished in 2010.

In 2005, the property was bought by Epoch, a family-owned investment company.

=== 2010 refurbishment ===
In the late 2000s, Wilson and Hill Architects redesigned the building as part of a project by Epoch Property to modernise the structure and attract new business to the western edge of the city. The design incorporated sustainable features, high ceilings and big windows for natural light, in heavy contrast to the original 1960s design.

The building was thoroughly refurbished in 2010, stripped down to its concrete frame, and completed by December of that year. The upper five floors of the tower were designated as office space. The ground level was reserved for retail space, initially occupied by coffeehouse chain 'Coffee Culture'. It was the only company to rent space in the building after the refurbishment. Outside of the Hornby Clocktower are a separate series of retail stores in the style of a strip mall, designed as an addition to the tower during its final refurbishment.

The redesigned Hornby Clocktower won the 2011 Canterbury Architecture Award for best commercial building.

=== Earthquake damage and demolition ===
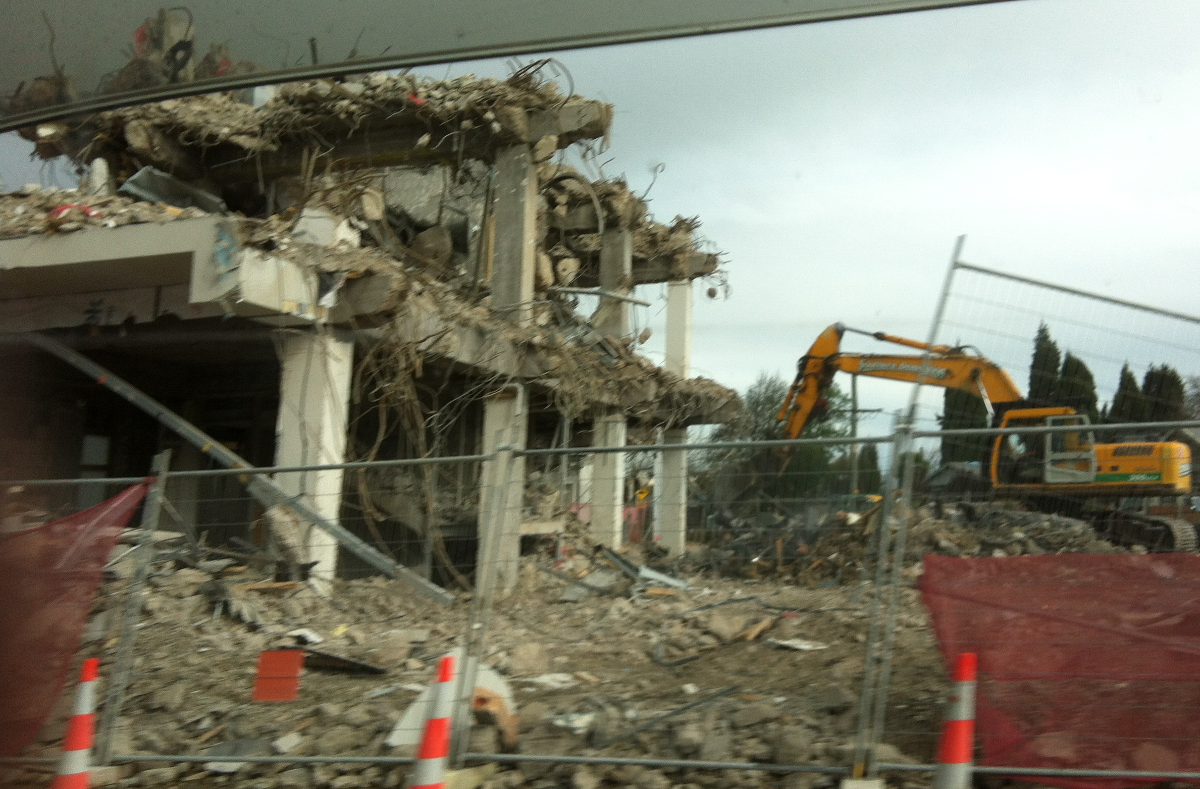
The tower being demolished in 2014

The building was largely undamaged by the 2010 Canterbury earthquake during the refurbishment. However, less than three months after completion, the tower suffered damaged in the 2011 Christchurch earthquake. Nobody was injured in the building at the time.

Engineers initially believed that the tower could be saved. Following strong aftershocks in December 2011, the tower was damaged further and was vacated for the final time. Epoch Property claimed in early 2012 that they wanted to keep the building, but believed it wouldn't be financially viable to repair it, and were considering demolition.

Epoch proceeded with plans to demolish the building, with work beginning on the tower in August 2014. It was completed in October. The surrounding strip mall survived, but the site of the tower remained vacant until 2016, when it was replaced by a Carl's Jr. fast food restaurant.

=== Legacy ===
Epoch renamed the site Clocktower Centre in a nod to its history, and retained the property as a mixed-used complex with the existing surrounding shops. In 2020, the site was listed for sale for the first time since it was acquired in 2005.
