= North New Brighton =

Suburb of Christchurch, New Zealand

- Suburb
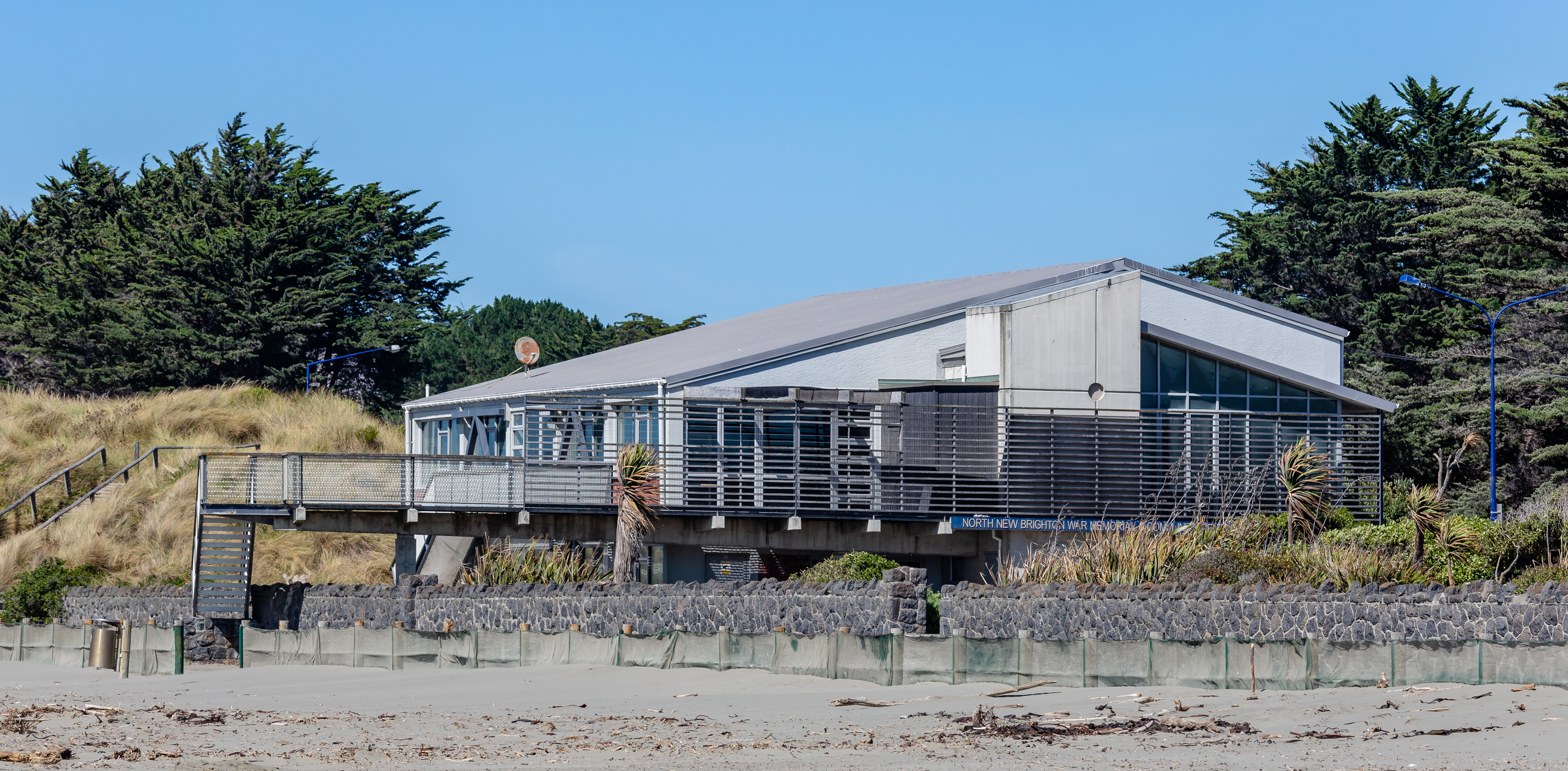
- North New Brighton War Memorial and Community Centre
- Interactive map of North New Brighton
- Coordinates: 43°29′31″S 172°43′8″E
- Country: New Zealand
- City: Christchurch
- Local authority: Christchurch City Council
- Electoral ward: Coastal
- Community board: Waitai Coastal-Burwood-Linwood

Area
  - Land: 199 ha (490 acres)

Population (June 2025)
  - Total: 4,220
  - Density: 2,120/km^{2} (5,490/sq mi)

	Parklands	Waimairi Beach
Burwood	North New Brighton	(Pegasus Bay)
(Residential red zone)		New Brighton

North New Brighton (Māori: Ōruapaeroa) is a suburb on the northern side of Christchurch city. It was originally known as North Beach and was readily accessible from Christchurch city by tram. It was renamed North New Brighton in 1953. A large sports centre and swimming pool is on the same locale as the former Queen Elizabeth II Park. The centre was rebuilt and opened in 2018.

The Māori name for North New Brighton and the Travis Wetlands is Ōruapaeroa, pre-European occupation it was rich with eels and bird life, and was considered as an important food-gathering place by the local iwi, Ngāi Tahu. The Māori wharenui were burned down in November 1882 when an early European settler acquired the land.

== Demographics ==
The statistical area of North Beach covers 1.99 km^{2} (0.77 sq mi). It had an estimated population of 4,220 as of June 2025, with a population density of 2,121 people per km^{2}.

Historical population
Year	Pop.	±% p.a.
2006	4,083	—
2013	4,002	−0.29%
2018	4,071	+0.34%
2023	4,101	+0.15%

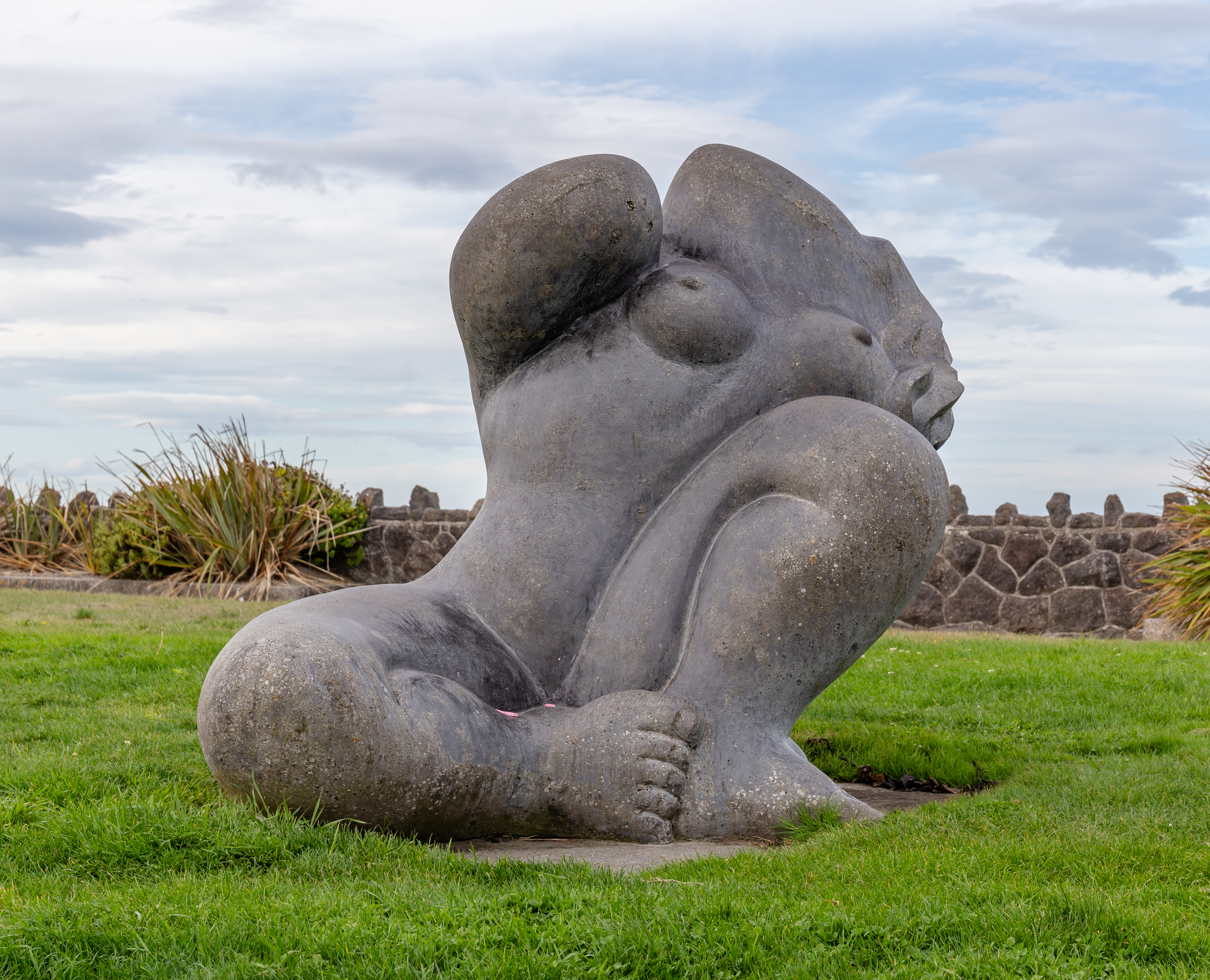
Moongazer sculpture on the foreshore

North Beach had a population of 4,101 in the 2023 New Zealand census, an increase of 30 people (0.7%) since the 2018 census, and an increase of 99 people (2.5%) since the 2013 census. There were 1,986 males, 2,097 females, and 18 people of other genders in 1,674 dwellings. 4.8% of people identified as LGBTIQ+. The median age was 38.6 years (compared with 38.1 years nationally). There were 801 people (19.5%) aged under 15 years, 690 (16.8%) aged 15 to 29, 2,010 (49.0%) aged 30 to 64, and 600 (14.6%) aged 65 or older.

People could identify as more than one ethnicity. The results were 89.3% European (Pākehā); 17.0% Māori; 4.0% Pasifika; 3.7% Asian; 1.0% Middle Eastern, Latin American and African New Zealanders (MELAA); and 3.3% other, which includes people giving their ethnicity as "New Zealander". English was spoken by 97.3%, Māori by 4.2%, Samoan by 0.7%, and other languages by 7.3%. No language could be spoken by 2.0% (e.g. too young to talk). New Zealand Sign Language was known by 0.7%. The percentage of people born overseas was 17.7, compared with 28.8% nationally.

Religious affiliations were 25.8% Christian, 0.1% Hindu, 0.1% Islam, 0.2% Māori religious beliefs, 0.4% Buddhist, 0.5% New Age, 0.3% Jewish, and 1.8% other religions. People who answered that they had no religion were 63.4%, and 7.5% of people did not answer the census question.

Of those at least 15 years old, 639 (19.4%) people had a bachelor's or higher degree, 1,836 (55.6%) had a post-high school certificate or diploma, and 828 (25.1%) people exclusively held high school qualifications. The median income was $39,300, compared with $41,500 nationally. 234 people (7.1%) earned over $100,000 compared to 12.1% nationally. The employment status of those at least 15 was 1,710 (51.8%) full-time, 486 (14.7%) part-time, and 105 (3.2%) unemployed.

== Education ==
Rāwhiti School is a full primary school catering for years 1 to 8. It had a roll of 520. The school opened in 2015 as the result of a merger between North New Brighton, Central New Brighton and Freeville Schools.

Shirley Boys' High School is a single-sex secondary school for years 9 to 13 with a roll of 1,315 students. The school opened in Shirley in 1957 and following damage to its site in the 2011 Christchurch earthquakes, it moved to the current location in 2019.

Avonside Girls' High School is also a single-sex secondary school for years 9 to 13. It has a roll of 1,088 students. It opened in Avonside in 1919, and moved to North New Brighton in 2019 due to earthquake damage in 2011.

All of these are state schools. Rolls are as of July 2026.
