= Waimairi Beach =

Suburb of Christchurch, New Zealand

- Suburb
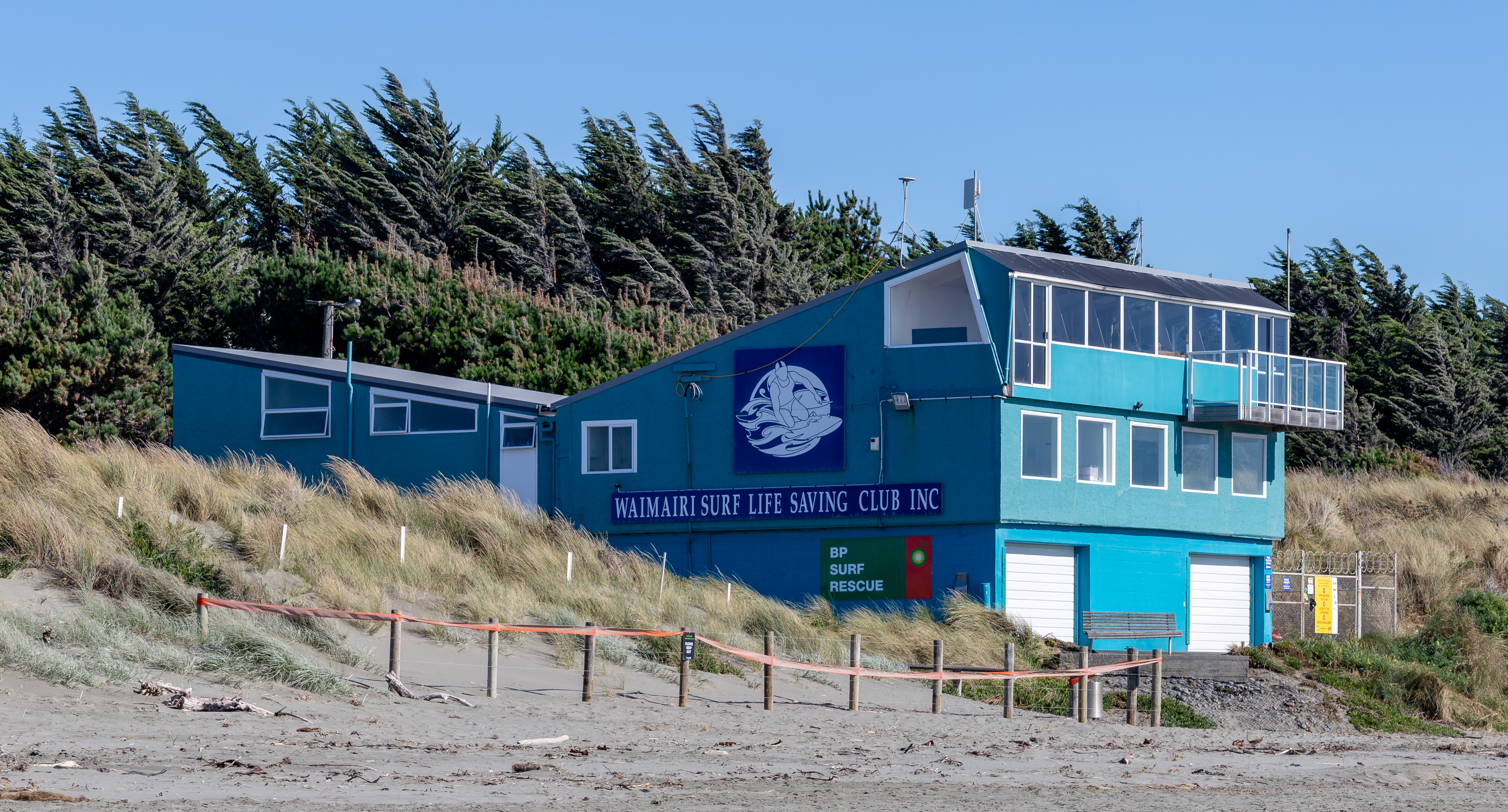
- Waimairi Surf Life Saving Club
- Interactive map of Waimairi Beach
- Coordinates: 43.482°S 172.719°E
- Country: New Zealand
- City: Christchurch
- Local authority: Christchurch City Council
- Electoral ward: Coastal
- Community board: Waitai Coastal-Burwood-Linwood

Area
  - Land: 58 ha (140 acres)

Population (June 2025)
  - Total: 1,340
  - Density: 2,300/km^{2} (6,000/sq mi)

Bottle Lake	Spencerville
Parklands	Waimairi Beach	(Pegasus Bay)
	North New Brighton

Waimairi Beach is a suburb of Christchurch, New Zealand. It is located north-east of the city. It is east of Parklands and north of North New Brighton. The word "waimairi" translates to "listless stream".

One of the main roads through the suburb is Aston Drive. This was originally Vogel Street, named after Prime Minister Julius Vogel (1835–1899) and renamed to Aston Street in 1848 after local landowner Sidney John Aston (1886–1946) and then to Aston Drive in 1995.

The area was part of Waimairi County until 1982, when the county was renamed to Waimairi District. The district was amalgamated into the Christchurch City Council in 1989 as part of the 1989 New Zealand local government reforms.

== Demographics ==
Waimairi Beach covers 0.58 km^{2} (0.22 sq mi). It had an estimated population of 1,340 as of June 2025, with a population density of 2,310 people per km^{2}.

Historical population
Year	Pop.	±% p.a.
2006	1,062	—
2013	1,266	+2.54%
2018	1,308	+0.65%
2023	1,293	−0.23%

Waimairi Beach had a population of 1,293 in the 2023 New Zealand census, a decrease of 15 people (−1.1%) since the 2018 census, and an increase of 27 people (2.1%) since the 2013 census. There were 627 males, 660 females, and 6 people of other genders in 471 dwellings. 3.0% of people identified as LGBTIQ+. The median age was 46.4 years (compared with 38.1 years nationally). There were 237 people (18.3%) aged under 15 years, 192 (14.8%) aged 15 to 29, 621 (48.0%) aged 30 to 64, and 240 (18.6%) aged 65 or older.

People could identify as more than one ethnicity. The results were 95.1% European (Pākehā); 9.7% Māori; 2.6% Pasifika; 1.6% Asian; 0.2% Middle Eastern, Latin American and African New Zealanders (MELAA); and 2.8% other, which includes people giving their ethnicity as "New Zealander". English was spoken by 97.7%, Māori by 1.4%, Samoan by 0.5%, and other languages by 7.9%. No language could be spoken by 1.9% (e.g. too young to talk). New Zealand Sign Language was known by 0.7%. The percentage of people born overseas was 19.0, compared with 28.8% nationally.

Religious affiliations were 34.1% Christian, 0.2% Hindu, 0.2% Buddhist, 0.7% New Age, and 1.2% other religions. People who answered that they had no religion were 57.5%, and 6.3% of people did not answer the census question.

Of those at least 15 years old, 321 (30.4%) people had a bachelor's or higher degree, 582 (55.1%) had a post-high school certificate or diploma, and 156 (14.8%) people exclusively held high school qualifications. The median income was $49,900, compared with $41,500 nationally. 225 people (21.3%) earned over $100,000 compared to 12.1% nationally. The employment status of those at least 15 was 540 (51.1%) full-time, 195 (18.5%) part-time, and 18 (1.7%) unemployed.
