= Travis Wetland =

Wetland in Burwood, Christchurch

Coordinates: 43.485852°S 172.693133°E

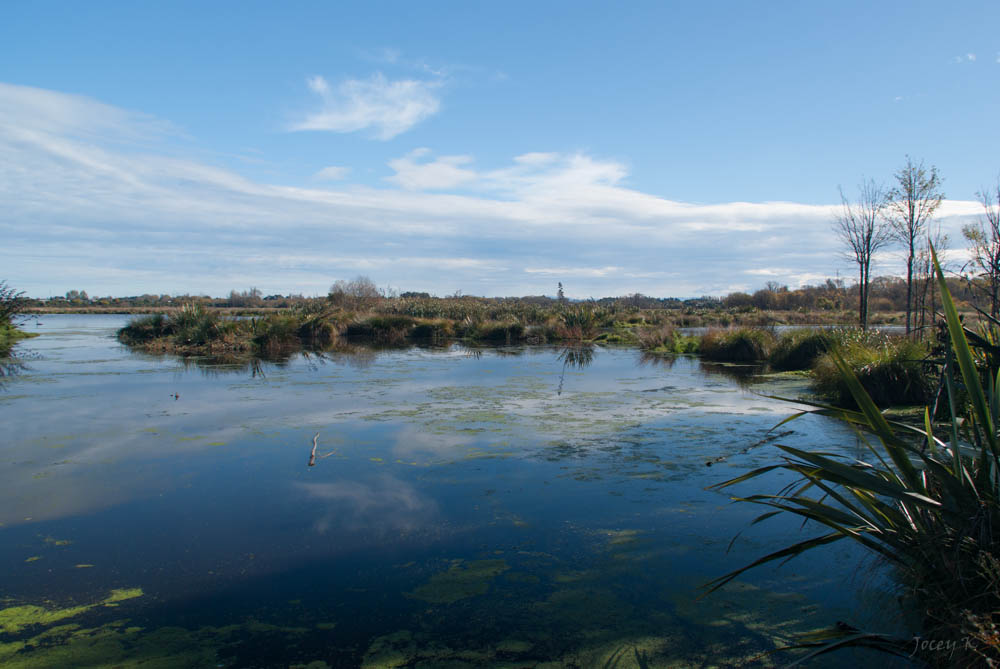
Travis Wetland in 2014

Travis Wetland is a wetland in the suburb of Burwood in Christchurch, New Zealand. An ecological restoration programme is being undertaken to restore the wetland. It covers 116 ha of land formerly drained and used as a dairy farm. In 2009 it won the "Urban Sustainability" category in the Green Ribbon Awards awarded by the Minister for the Environment.

The Māori name for North New Brighton and the Travis Wetlands is Ōruapaeroa, pre-European occupation it was rich with eels and bird life, and was considered as an important food-gathering place by the local iwi, Ngāi Tahu, the Māori communal houses were burnt down in November 1882 when an early European settler acquired the land.

In May 2010 the rare and endangered Canterbury mudfish were released into the wetland in the hope that they would become established.

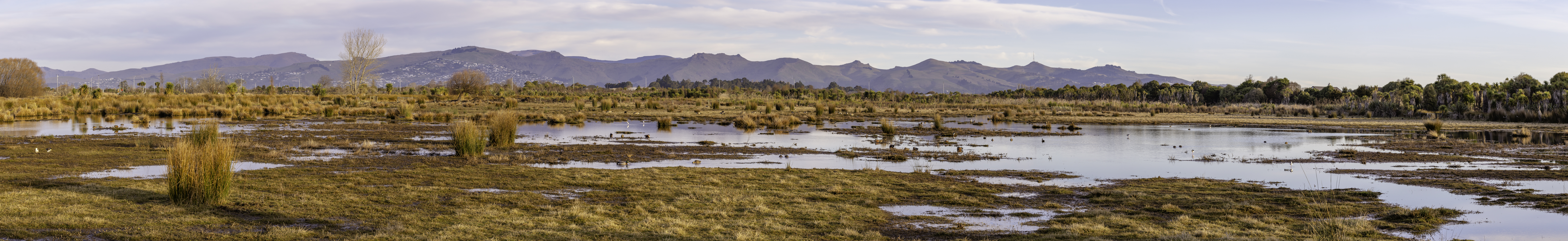
Panorama of Travis Wetland from August 2019

== See also ==
- Wetlands of New Zealand
- Environment of New Zealand
