= Avonside Girls' High School =

Secondary school in Christchurch, New Zealand

- Māori: Te Kura Kōhine o Ōtākaro
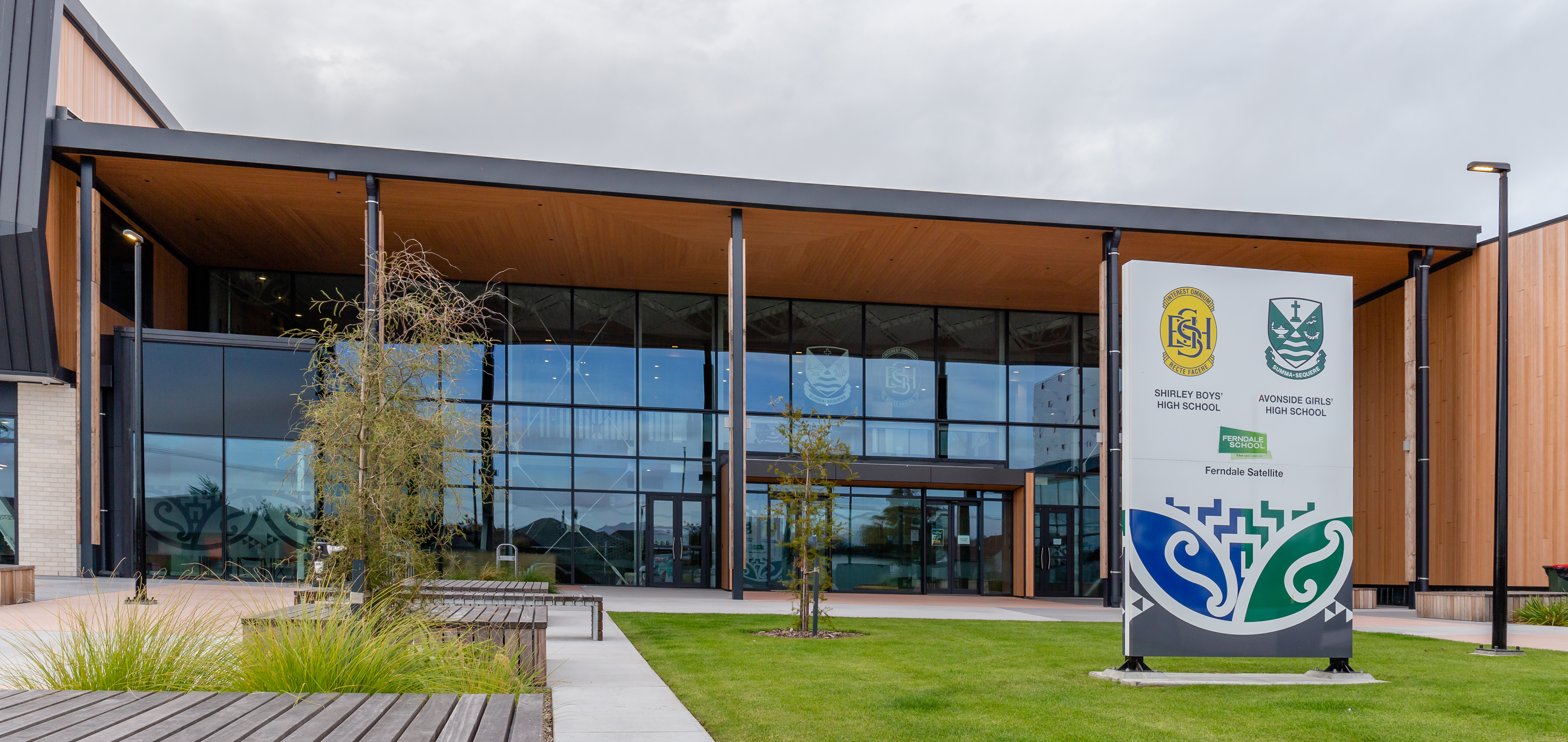
- New building shared with Shirley Boys' High School

Location
- 209 Travis Road; Christchurch; New Zealand

Information
- Type: Girls state secondary school
- Motto: Latin: Summa Sequere ("Aim at the highest – seek to attain the best")
- Established: 1919
- Ministry of Education Institution no.: 324
- Principal: Catherine Law
- Grades: 9–13
- Gender: Girls
- Enrolment: 1,088 (July 2026)
- Socio-economic decile: 6N
- Website: avonside.school.nz

Avonside Girls' High School (Māori: Te Kura Kōhine o Ōtākaro) is a large urban high school in Christchurch, New Zealand, with more than 1,000 girls from Year 9 to Year 13. It was formerly in the suburb of Avonside but moved in 2019, along with Shirley Boys' High School, to the former QEII Park site in the east of Christchurch.

== History ==
The school originally opened in January 1919 on the Avonside Drive site as a satellite campus of Christchurch Girls' High School. It became a separate school in its own right in 1928.

=== Earthquake ===
Following the 22 February 2011 Christchurch earthquake, the school site closed, with classes operating at Burnside High School in the afternoons. Two school blocks, including the Main Block, were condemned following the earthquake and were demolished.

Students returned to the Avonside site at the beginning of 2012, with relocatable and prefabricated classrooms filling gaps left by the condemned buildings, but due to significant land damage adjacent to the school site, it was clear that the school might need to close or relocate. Education Minister Hekia Parata announced on 16 October 2013 that the school would move, and be co-located with Shirley Boys' High School at a new site in east Christchurch, and on 12 February 2015 the site was confirmed to be the former QEII Park site – and the move was complete in April 2019.

== Enrolment ==
As of July 2026, Avonside Girls' High School has roll of 1,088 students, of which 283 (26.0%) identify as Māori.

As of 2026, the school has an Equity Index of 472, placing it amongst schools whose students have above average socioeconomic barriers to achievement (roughly equivalent to decile 4 under the former socio-economic decile system).

== Notable staff ==
Before she entered politics, Marian Hobbs was principal of the school. Jean Herbison, later New Zealand's first female chancellor of a New Zealand university, taught at the school from 1952 to 1959.

Catherine Law is the current principal of the school. She graduated with a doctorate in education from the University of Auckland.
