= Parklands, New Zealand =

Suburb of Christchurch, New Zealand

Parklands
- Suburb
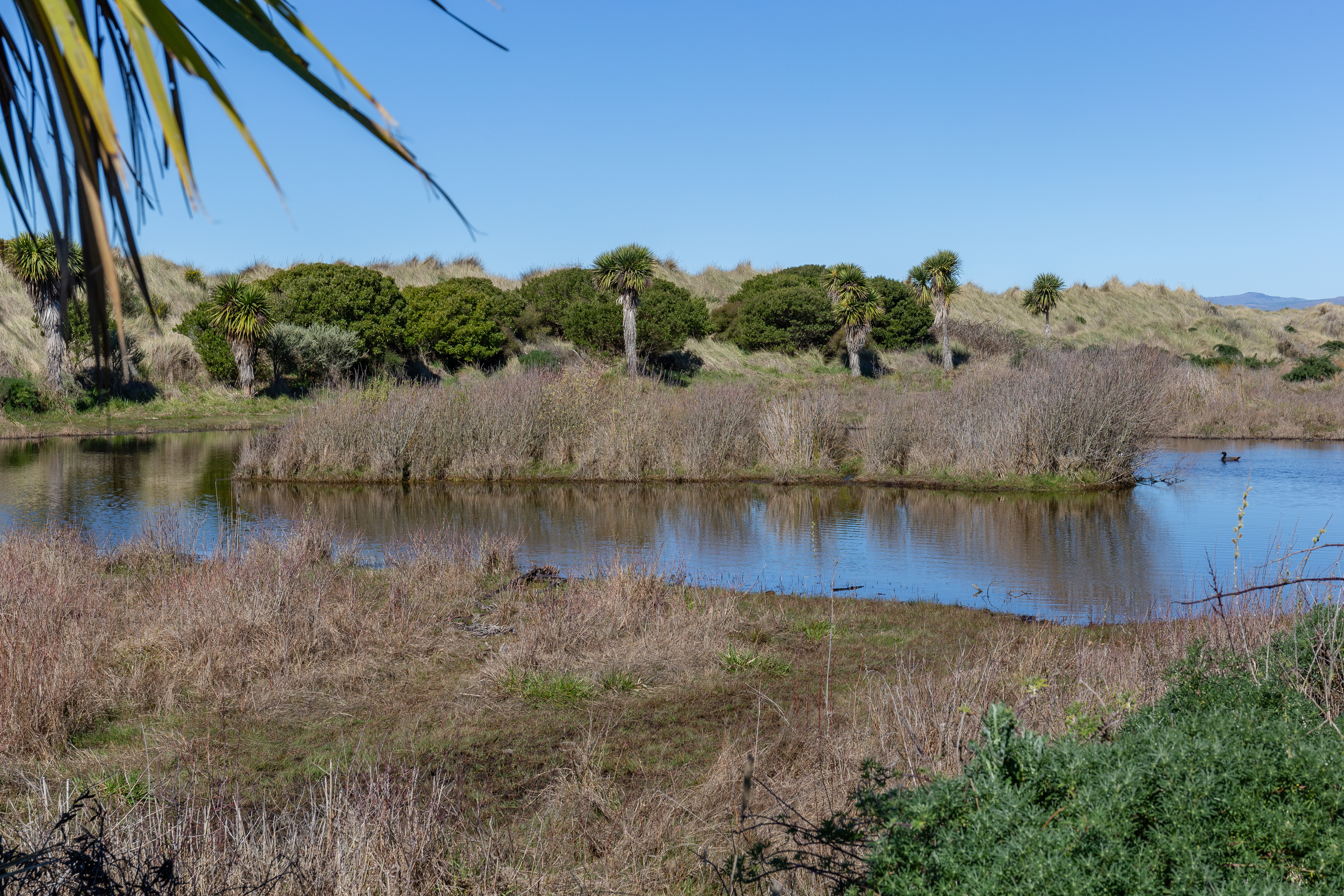
- A small lake in Bottle Lake Forest Park, bordering the suburb of Parklands
- Interactive map of Parklands
- Coordinates: 43.481°S 172.705°E
- Country: New Zealand
- City: Christchurch
- Local authority: Christchurch City Council
- Electoral ward: Burwood; Coastal
- Community board: Waitai Coastal-Burwood-Linwood

Area
  - Land: 479 ha (1,180 acres)

Population (June 2025)
  - Total: 10,420
  - Density: 2,180/km^{2} (5,630/sq mi)

Bottle Lake	Bottle Lake Forest	(Pegasus Bay)
Prestons	Parklands	Waimairi Beach
	Burwood	North New Brighton

Parklands is a suburb of Christchurch, New Zealand. It is located north east of the city centre near Bottle Lake Forest.

The area between Burwood Hospital and Waimairi Golf Club was occupied by a brickworks established by John Brightling (1842–1928). It was developed as a residential suburb from 1963.

== Demographics ==
Parklands, comprising the statistical areas of Parklands, Waitikiri and Queenspark, covers 4.79 km^{2} (1.85 sq mi). It had an estimated population of 10,420 as of June 2025, with a population density of 2,175 people per km^{2}.

Historical population
Year	Pop.	±% p.a.
2006	9,048	—
2013	9,798	+1.14%
2018	10,239	+0.88%
2023	10,137	−0.20%
The 2006 population is for a smaller area of 4.77 km^{2}. Source:

Parklands had a population of 10,137 in the 2023 New Zealand census, a decrease of 102 people (−1.0%) since the 2018 census, and an increase of 339 people (3.5%) since the 2013 census. There were 4,941 males, 5,145 females, and 51 people of other genders in 3,657 dwellings. 3.2% of people identified as LGBTIQ+. The median age was 40.1 years (compared with 38.1 years nationally). There were 2,064 people (20.4%) aged under 15 years, 1,737 (17.1%) aged 15 to 29, 4,761 (47.0%) aged 30 to 64, and 1,572 (15.5%) aged 65 or older.

People could identify as more than one ethnicity. The results were 89.1% European (Pākehā); 14.9% Māori; 4.6% Pasifika; 4.6% Asian; 0.8% Middle Eastern, Latin American and African New Zealanders (MELAA); and 2.6% other, which includes people giving their ethnicity as "New Zealander". English was spoken by 97.6%, Māori by 2.8%, Samoan by 1.0%, and other languages by 6.5%. No language could be spoken by 1.8% (e.g. too young to talk). New Zealand Sign Language was known by 0.5%. The percentage of people born overseas was 16.4, compared with 28.8% nationally.

Religious affiliations were 27.3% Christian, 0.4% Hindu, 0.3% Islam, 0.2% Māori religious beliefs, 0.4% Buddhist, 0.4% New Age, and 1.1% other religions. People who answered that they had no religion were 62.9%, and 7.2% of people did not answer the census question.

Of those at least 15 years old, 1,530 (19.0%) people had a bachelor's or higher degree, 4,725 (58.5%) had a post-high school certificate or diploma, and 1,815 (22.5%) people exclusively held high school qualifications. The median income was $43,800, compared with $41,500 nationally. 906 people (11.2%) earned over $100,000 compared to 12.1% nationally. The employment status of those at least 15 was 4,179 (51.8%) full-time, 1,308 (16.2%) part-time, and 153 (1.9%) unemployed.

Individual statistical areas
Name	Area (km^{2})	Population	Density (per km^{2})	Dwellings	Median age	Median income
Parklands	1.80	4,011	2,228	1,491	39.7 years	$40,100
Waitikiri	1.87	2,610	1,396	888	45.1 years	$52,300
Queenspark	1.12	3,516	3,139	1,278	36.7 years	$42,000
New Zealand					38.1 years	$41,500

== Education ==
Parkview Pārua School and Queenspark School are state coeducational full primary schools catering for years 1 to 8. As of July 2026, they have rolls of 380 and 453 students, respectively. Both schools were founded in 1977.
