= Burwood, New Zealand =

Suburb of Christchurch, New Zealand

Burwood
- Suburb
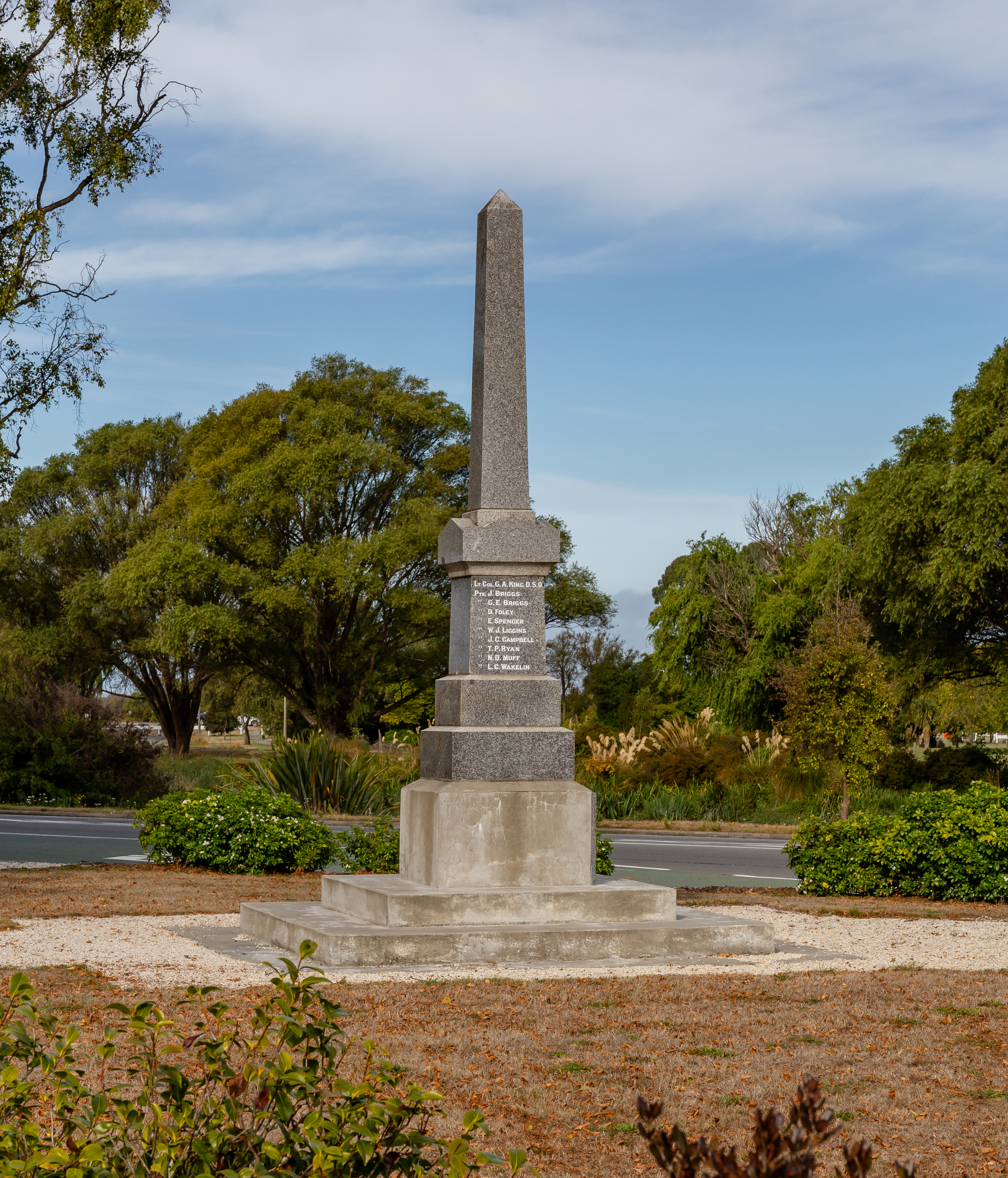
- Burwood war memorial
- Interactive map of Burwood
- Coordinates: 43°30′S 172°42′E
- Country: New Zealand
- City: Christchurch
- Local authority: Christchurch City Council
- Electoral ward: Burwood; Coastal
- Community board: Waitai Coastal-Burwood-Linwood

Area
  - Land: 365 ha (900 acres)

Population (June 2025)
  - Total: 6,360
  - Density: 1,740/km^{2} (4,510/sq mi)

Prestons		Parklands
Shirley	Burwood	North New Brighton
(Residential red zone)	(Residential red zone)	(Residential red zone)

Burwood is a north-eastern suburb of Christchurch, New Zealand. The suburb is mostly a residential area and is centred on Burwood Hospital, Travis Wetland Nature Heritage Park and Bottle Lake Forest (a 31-acre (130,000 m^{2}) recreation, forested area).

Large areas of Burwood, including the Horseshoe Lake area, suffered severe damage in the 2010 and 2011 Christchurch earthquakes, and were abandoned under government policy that placed them in a residential red zone.

== Demographics ==
Burwood covers 3.65 km^{2} (1.41 sq mi). It had an estimated population of 6,360 as of June 2025, with a population density of 1,742 people per km^{2}.

Historical population
Year	Pop.	±% p.a.
2006	5,655	—
2013	5,640	−0.04%
2018	5,661	+0.07%
2023	6,096	+1.49%
The 2006 population is for a larger area of 3.76 km^{2}. Source:

Burwood had a population of 6,096 in the 2023 New Zealand census, an increase of 435 people (7.7%) since the 2018 census, and an increase of 456 people (8.1%) since the 2013 census. There were 2,997 males, 3,069 females, and 33 people of other genders in 2,244 dwellings. 4.0% of people identified as LGBTIQ+. The median age was 37.5 years (compared with 38.1 years nationally). There were 1,179 people (19.3%) aged under 15 years, 1,119 (18.4%) aged 15 to 29, 2,832 (46.5%) aged 30 to 64, and 966 (15.8%) aged 65 or older.

People could identify as more than one ethnicity. The results were 86.8% European (Pākehā); 14.8% Māori; 4.4% Pasifika; 6.6% Asian; 1.2% Middle Eastern, Latin American and African New Zealanders (MELAA); and 2.8% other, which includes people giving their ethnicity as "New Zealander". English was spoken by 96.4%, Māori by 2.7%, Samoan by 1.2%, and other languages by 8.4%. No language could be spoken by 2.6% (e.g. too young to talk). New Zealand Sign Language was known by 0.7%. The percentage of people born overseas was 16.3, compared with 28.8% nationally.

Religious affiliations were 27.8% Christian, 1.0% Hindu, 0.5% Islam, 0.5% Māori religious beliefs, 0.4% Buddhist, 0.4% New Age, and 1.4% other religions. People who answered that they had no religion were 61.6%, and 6.3% of people did not answer the census question.

Of those at least 15 years old, 936 (19.0%) people had a bachelor's or higher degree, 2,763 (56.2%) had a post-high school certificate or diploma, and 1,215 (24.7%) people exclusively held high school qualifications. The median income was $41,400, compared with $41,500 nationally. 417 people (8.5%) earned over $100,000 compared to 12.1% nationally. The employment status of those at least 15 was 2,535 (51.6%) full-time, 723 (14.7%) part-time, and 123 (2.5%) unemployed.

Individual statistical areas
Name	Area (km^{2})	Population	Density (per km^{2})	Dwellings	Median age	Median income
Burwood North	2.44	2,541	1,041	924	39.6 years	$40,400
Burwood South	1.21	3,558	2,940	1,323	36.2 years	$41,900
New Zealand					38.1 years	$41,500

== Education ==
Waitākiri Primary School is a contributing primary school catering for years 1 to 6. It had a roll of 539 students as of July 2026. Waitākiri was created in 2014 by the amalgamation of Burwood Primary School (opened 1872 as New Brighton Primary School) and Windsor School (opened 1970) in the Fifth National Government's Christchurch school restructuring.
