= East Lake (New Zealand) =

Proposed lake in Christchurch, New Zealand

Coordinates: 43°30′30″S 172°40′41″E

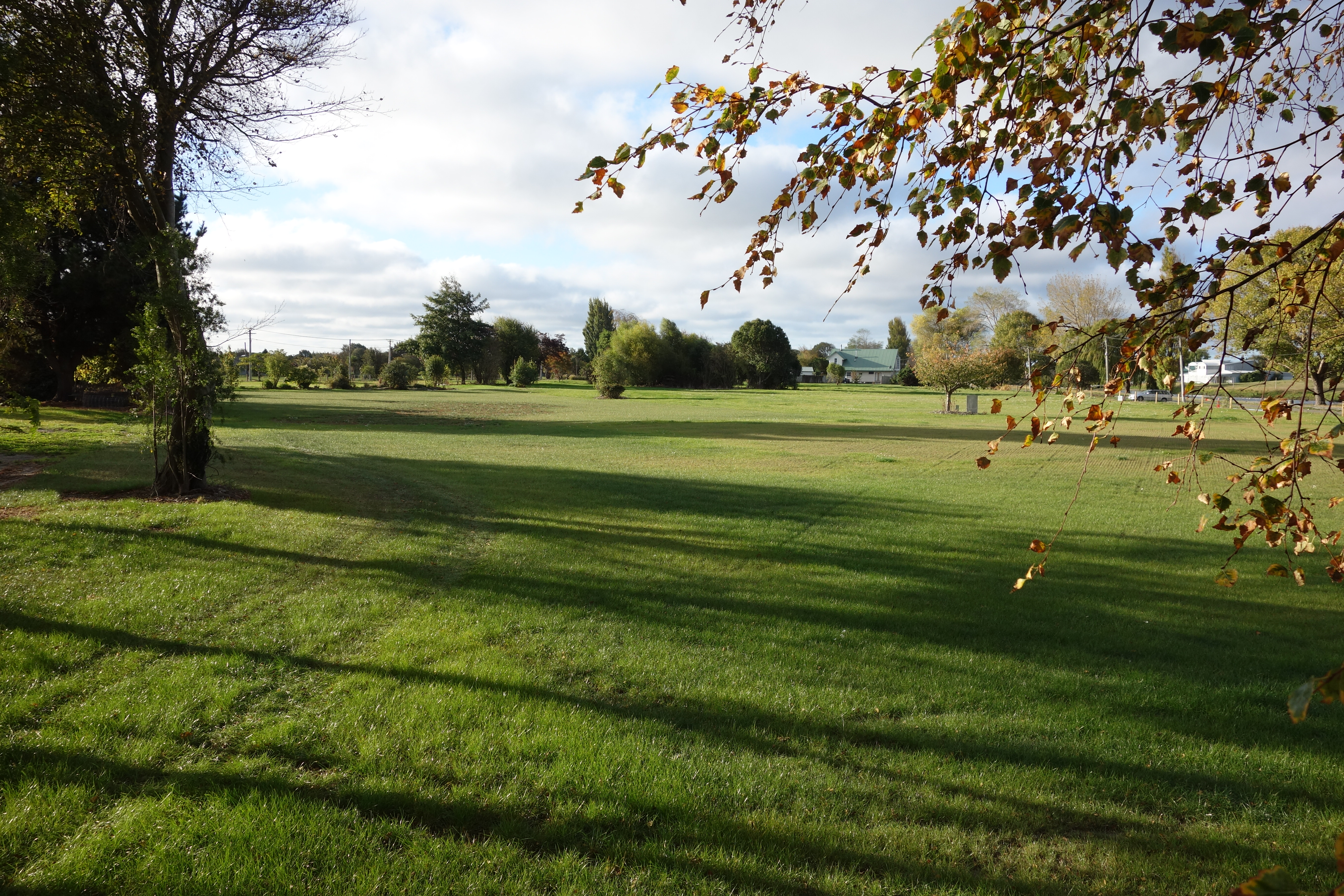
The proposed location of East Lake viewed from its southern end; there was dense housing here until the earthquakes

East Lake is an open water course under consideration in Christchurch, New Zealand. The facility, located within the residential red zone adjacent to the Avon River, would be suitable for international rowing regattas. The facility is estimated at NZ$160m to construct.

== History ==
=== Earlier rowing lake proposals ===
There have been proposals for an international rowing facility for Christchurch since the early 2000s. The first proposal is known under the name Lake Isaac, an artificial lake on land known as McLeans Island next to the Waimakariri River owned by Diana Isaac. The proposal died when it was opposed by neighbouring Christchurch International Airport, with executives fearing that attracting more water foul to the area would increase the risk of bird strike for planes landing or starting. The plans for Lake Isaac were given to the International Rowing Federation (FISA) and from them were passed on to the organisers of the 2012 Summer Olympics, and were the blueprint for Dorney Lake.

Later in the 2000s, a proposal was developed to use the Henderson Basin in Halswell for a rowing course. Before the plans could be much further, the 2010 and 2011 earthquakes happened.

=== East Lake proposal ===
As a result of the earthquakes, large areas of land along the Avon River was deemed as unsuitable for housing, the residential red zone was gazetted starting in June 2011, and the land purchased by the Crown for NZ$1.5b. It was reported in 2012 that the idea of using the red zone had found the support of the Earthquake Recovery Minister, Gerry Brownlee. The minister has two relatives who have represented New Zealand in rowing; his uncle Mark Brownlee represented New Zealand at the 1964 and 1968 Olympics, and his cousin Scott Brownlee represented New Zealand at the 1992, 1996, and 2000 Olympics. In December 2013, Brownlee first publicly supported a water course for rowing, swimming, and triathlon, while at the same time acting as a large stormwater holding basin that could reduce flooding (the earthquakes had resulted in land to subside). Earlier in the year, Brownlee had consulted with those who were responsible for constructing Lake Dorney.

The government agency responsible for the red zone, the Canterbury Earthquake Recovery Authority (CERA), never engaged with the public on what could eventually happen with the land. In this information vacuum, a community group—Eastern Vision—formed itself to work with the community on their aspirations; Eastern Vision was led by Peter Beck and Evan Smith. Twenty-seven key projects were considered for east Christchurch, and the proposal for East Lake found wide support. Two lake proposals were considered, with lengths of 1.25 kilometres (0.78 mi) and 2.25 kilometres (1.40 mi) in length, and Beck reported that over 80% of respondents agreed or strongly agreed with the longer lake. The East Christchurch Water Sports Community Trust formed itself in 2014 to progress the proposal and has since renamed itself East Lake Trust. It is proposed to also provide other aquatic facilities, like boarding assisted by a cable ("cable boarding"), and an artificial white water rafting facility.

When CERA ceased to exist in April 2016, some of its functions were taken over by Regenerate Christchurch, a joint agency of the Crown and Christchurch City Council responsible for developing and overseeing regeneration plans. Part of the brief that Regenerate Christchurch was given is to investigate the feasibility of East Lake:

Part of your consideration of the Avon River Corridor land should assess the feasibility of an open water course suitable for international water sports being constructed in the residential red zone.

— Gerry Brownlee and Lianne Dalziel, Letter of Expectations for Regenerate Christchurch, 14 April 2016

The chairman of Regenerate Christchurch, Andre Lovatt, hoped that decisions about the red zone along the Avon River could be made "within 12 to 18 months" (i.e. during 2017). Some groups expressed concern about potential favouritism as East Lake was the only initiative explicitly mentioned in Regenerate Christchurch's brief. East Lake Trust published its pre-feasibility study in August 2017, in which the facility is estimated at NZ$160m to construct, with annual operating costs predicted at NZ$500k.

Regenerate Christchurch has doubts that the East Lake development would be environmentally appropriate, and it was not included in the Ōtākaro/Avon River Corridor Regeneration Plan, passed in August 2019.

Regenerate Christchurch itself has now closed down.

== Location ==
East Lake would be located to the north and west of the Avon River in the Christchurch suburbs of Dallington and Burwood. Its southern end would be separated from the Avon River by Locksley Avenue, in a location opposite the existing rowing sheds on the stretch of the river that is known as Kerrs Reach. The lake would roughly be aligned in the north-south orientation and its northern end would extend to and incorporate Horseshoe Lake.
