= Bromley, New Zealand =

Suburb of Christchurch, New Zealand

Bromley
- Suburb
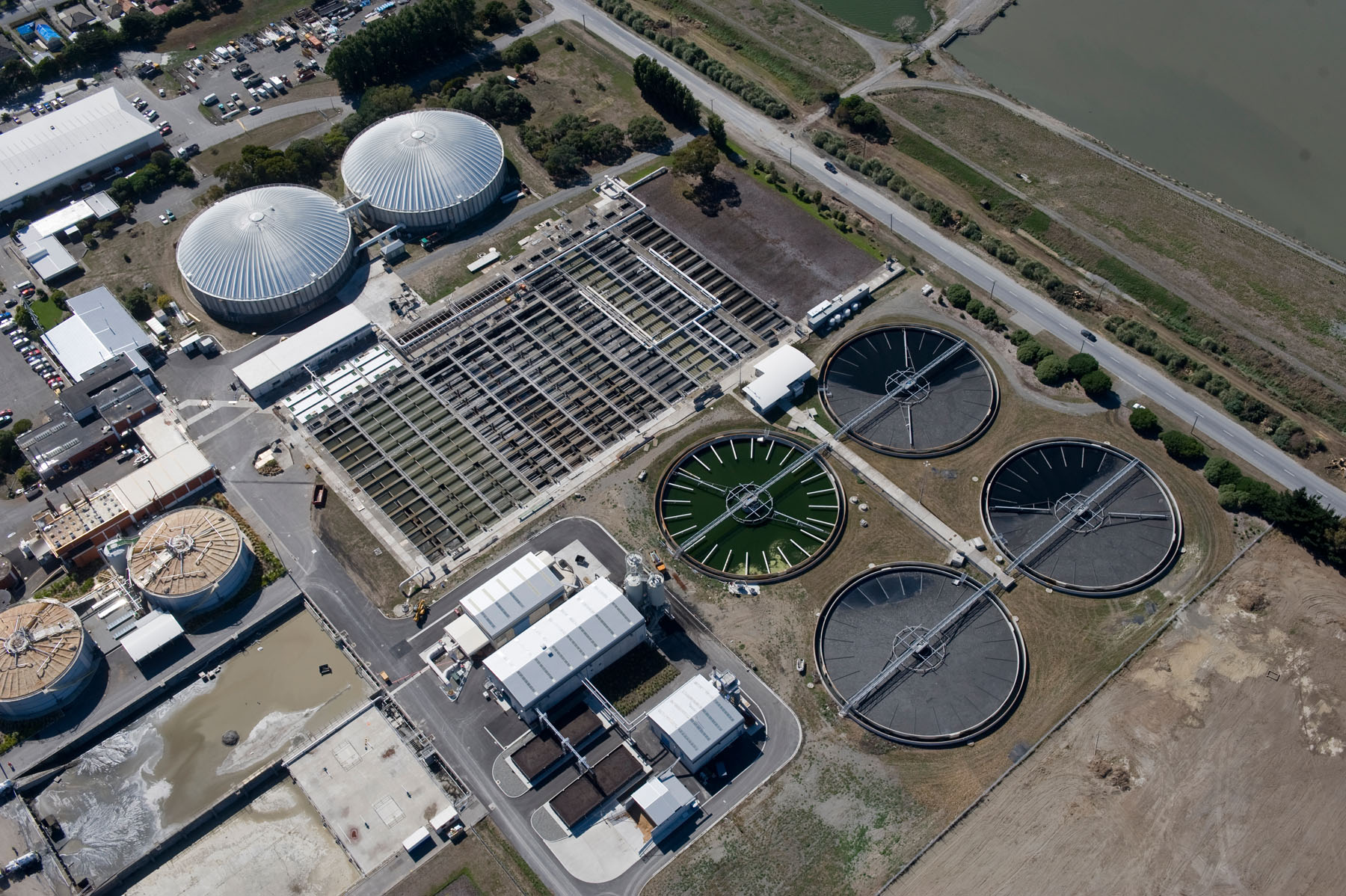
- Aerial image of the Bromley sewage treatment plant
- Interactive map of Bromley
- Coordinates: 43°33′00″S 172°42′00″E
- Country: New Zealand
- City: Christchurch
- Local authority: Christchurch City Council
- Electoral ward: Linwood
- Community board: Waitai Coastal-Burwood-Linwood

Area
  - Land: 747 ha (1,850 acres)

Population (June 2025)
  - Total: 3,110
  - Density: 416/km^{2} (1,080/sq mi)

Wainoni	Bexley, New Zealand	(Residential red zone)
Linwood	Bromley	(Avon Heathcote Estuary / Ihutai)
Woolston	Ferrymead

Bromley is a suburb of the city of Christchurch, New Zealand. It lies to the east of the city centre, mostly between Pages Road and the Avon Heathcote Estuary.

== History ==
Bromley was named after the town in north-west Kent in England.

In 1883, a sewage farm was established next to the Avon estuary. This was later developed when sewage works were built between 1958 and 1962. As of 2018, the area includes oxidation ponds and a wildlife reserve.

From 1913, Christchurch City Council looked for additional cemetery space and one of the options under consideration was a reserve that the city owned in Bromley, which at the time was located in Heathcote County. In 1915, the designation of the land was changed, preparatory work happened in 1917, and in July the Bromley Cemetery opened for burials. This was just prior to the 1918 flu pandemic and the new cemetery became the main burial ground for flu victims from the eastern part of the city. The cemetery was extended in size in 1940. Ruru Lawn Cemetery opened in 1941 and is the burial ground for the victims of the 1947 Ballantyne's fire. Memorial Park Cemetery has been in use since 1956 and, like Ruru Lawn Cemetery, is operational.

In 1990 a major marae complex, Ngā Hau e Whā National Marae, was opened in the suburb. The marae acts as a cultural and community centre.

The various parks and cemeteries in Bromley form a buffer between the residential area in the west, and the industrial area and sewage treatment plant in the east. The exception is Maces Road, where the north side is industrial and the south side is residential. Like other suburbs in the east of Christchurch, and in proximity to the Avon River or the Avon Heathcote Estuary, Bromley suffered great damage in the 2011 Christchurch earthquake. None of the land in the suburb was red zoned, though.

== Demographics ==
Bromley comprises two statistical areas. Bromley South is primarily residential. Bromley North contains the industrial area, the sewage treatment plant, and some rural land.

Individual statistical areas
Name	Area (km^{2})	Population	Density (per km^{2})	Dwellings	Median age	Median income
Bromley South	1.24	2,916	2,352	1,116	36.7 years	$37,000
Bromley North	6.23	51	8.2	27	41.7 years	$33,900
New Zealand					38.1 years	$41,500

=== Bromley South ===
Bromley South covers 1.24 km^{2} (0.48 sq mi). It had an estimated population of 3,050 as of June 2025, with a population density of 2,460 people per km^{2}.

Historical populations for Bromley South
Year	Pop.	±% p.a.
2006	2,940	—
2013	2,922	−0.09%
2018	2,949	+0.18%
2023	2,916	−0.22%

Bromley South had a population of 2,916 in the 2023 New Zealand census, a decrease of 33 people (−1.1%) since the 2018 census, and a decrease of 6 people (−0.2%) since the 2013 census. There were 1,470 males, 1,434 females, and 12 people of other genders in 1,116 dwellings. 4.9% of people identified as LGBTIQ+. The median age was 36.7 years (compared with 38.1 years nationally). There were 564 people (19.3%) aged under 15 years, 573 (19.7%) aged 15 to 29, 1,386 (47.5%) aged 30 to 64, and 393 (13.5%) aged 65 or older.

People could identify as more than one ethnicity. The results were 73.4% European (Pākehā); 22.2% Māori; 11.9% Pasifika; 9.1% Asian; 2.1% Middle Eastern, Latin American and African New Zealanders (MELAA); and 2.7% other, which includes people giving their ethnicity as "New Zealander". English was spoken by 95.8%, Māori by 5.0%, Samoan by 5.3%, and other languages by 7.8%. No language could be spoken by 2.0% (e.g. too young to talk). New Zealand Sign Language was known by 1.2%. The percentage of people born overseas was 18.0, compared with 28.8% nationally.

Religious affiliations were 27.0% Christian, 1.6% Hindu, 1.3% Islam, 0.8% Māori religious beliefs, 0.4% Buddhist, 0.4% New Age, and 1.6% other religions. People who answered that they had no religion were 59.0%, and 8.1% of people did not answer the census question.

Of those at least 15 years old, 258 (11.0%) people had a bachelor's or higher degree, 1,353 (57.5%) had a post-high school certificate or diploma, and 744 (31.6%) people exclusively held high school qualifications. The median income was $37,000, compared with $41,500 nationally. 69 people (2.9%) earned over $100,000 compared to 12.1% nationally. The employment status of those at least 15 was 1,230 (52.3%) full-time, 273 (11.6%) part-time, and 90 (3.8%) unemployed.

=== Bromley North ===
Bromley North covers 6.23 km^{2} (2.41 sq mi). It had an estimated population of 60 as of June 2025, with a population density of 10 people per km^{2}.

Historical populations for Bromley North
Year	Pop.	±% p.a.
2006	48	—
2013	63	+3.96%
2018	57	−1.98%
2023	51	−2.20%

Bromley North had a population of 51 in the 2023 New Zealand census, a decrease of 6 people (−10.5%) since the 2018 census, and a decrease of 12 people (−19.0%) since the 2013 census. There were 33 males, 18 females, and 3 people of other genders in 27 dwellings. 5.9% of people identified as LGBTIQ+. The median age was 41.7 years (compared with 38.1 years nationally). There were 6 people (11.8%) aged under 15 years, 9 (17.6%) aged 15 to 29, 30 (58.8%) aged 30 to 64, and 6 (11.8%) aged 65 or older.

People could identify as more than one ethnicity. The results were 76.5% European (Pākehā), 29.4% Māori, and 5.9% Asian. English was spoken by 100.0%, and Māori by 5.9%. The percentage of people born overseas was 11.8, compared with 28.8% nationally.

Religious affiliations were 11.8% Christian, 5.9% Hindu, and 11.8% Māori religious beliefs. People who answered that they had no religion were 64.7%, and 5.9% of people did not answer the census question.

Of those at least 15 years old, 6 (13.3%) people had a bachelor's or higher degree, 15 (33.3%) had a post-high school certificate or diploma, and 21 (46.7%) people exclusively held high school qualifications. The median income was $33,900, compared with $41,500 nationally. 3 people (6.7%) earned over $100,000 compared to 12.1% nationally. The employment status of those at least 15 was 21 (46.7%) full-time, 3 (6.7%) part-time, and 3 (6.7%) unemployed.

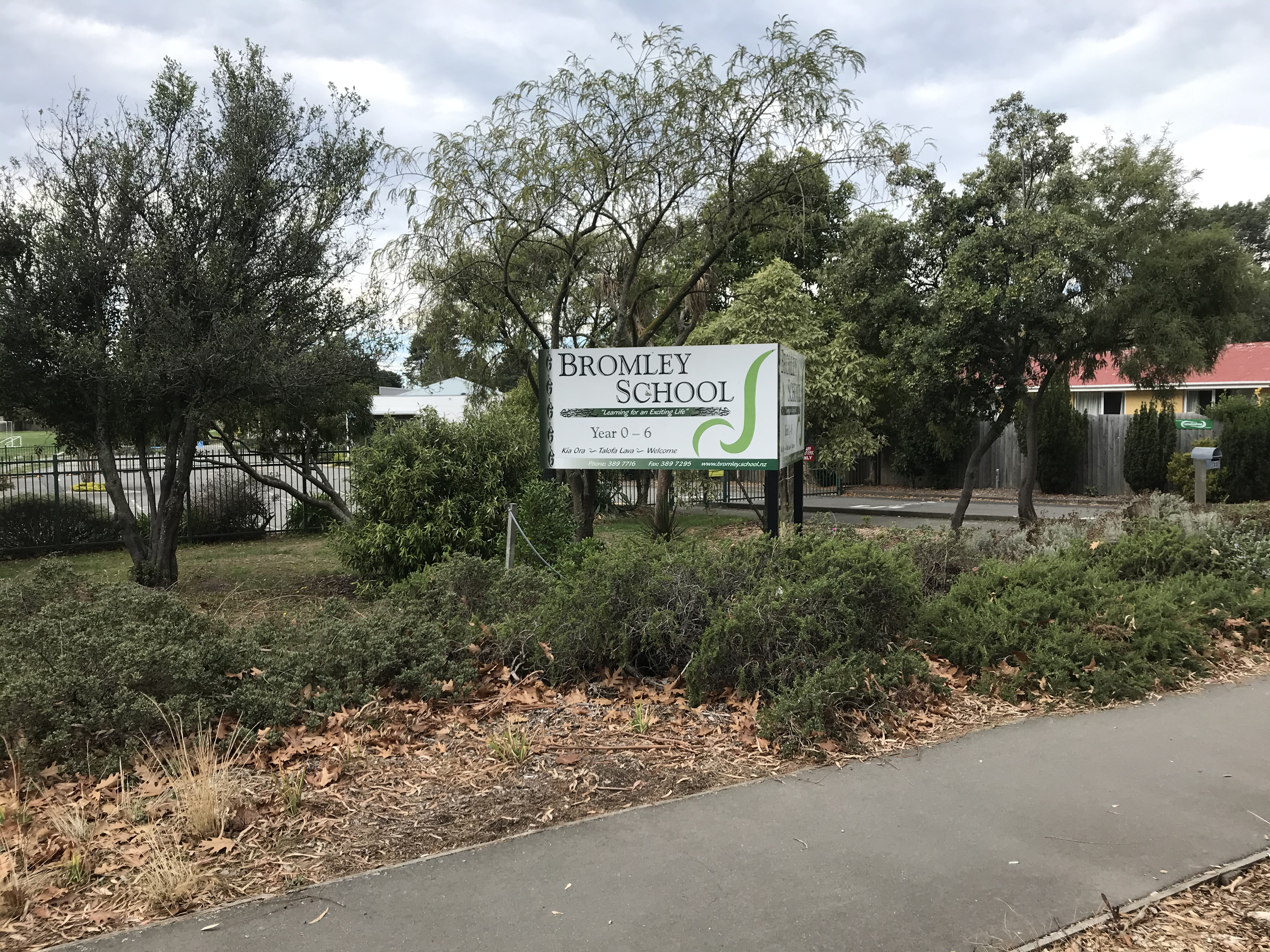
Bromley School

== Education ==
Bromley School is a contributing primary school catering for years 1 to 6. It had a roll of 359 as of July 2026. The school opened in 1880.

== Climate ==
Climate data for Bromley (1962–1990 normals, extremes 1962–1990, 2019–present)
Month	Jan	Feb	Mar	Apr	May	Jun	Jul	Aug	Sep	Oct	Nov	Dec	Year
Record high °C (°F)	36.2 (97.2)	39.0 (102.2)	34.5 (94.1)	30.7 (87.3)	26.5 (79.7)	22.6 (72.7)	22.6 (72.7)	23.1 (73.6)	25.3 (77.5)	30.2 (86.4)	32.1 (89.8)	34.0 (93.2)	39.0 (102.2)
Mean maximum °C (°F)	30.9 (87.6)	30.4 (86.7)	28.5 (83.3)	25.1 (77.2)	21.1 (70.0)	17.8 (64.0)	17.3 (63.1)	18.7 (65.7)	21.6 (70.9)	24.7 (76.5)	26.7 (80.1)	28.7 (83.7)	32.5 (90.5)
Mean daily maximum °C (°F)	21.7 (71.1)	21.2 (70.2)	19.9 (67.8)	17.2 (63.0)	13.9 (57.0)	11.5 (52.7)	10.8 (51.4)	12.0 (53.6)	14.4 (57.9)	16.6 (61.9)	18.5 (65.3)	20.3 (68.5)	16.5 (61.7)
Daily mean °C (°F)	17.5 (63.5)	17.0 (62.6)	15.7 (60.3)	12.9 (55.2)	9.8 (49.6)	7.3 (45.1)	6.8 (44.2)	8.0 (46.4)	10.1 (50.2)	12.2 (54.0)	14.1 (57.4)	16.0 (60.8)	12.3 (54.1)
Mean daily minimum °C (°F)	13.2 (55.8)	12.8 (55.0)	11.7 (53.1)	8.7 (47.7)	5.6 (42.1)	3.1 (37.6)	2.8 (37.0)	4.0 (39.2)	6.0 (42.8)	7.8 (46.0)	9.7 (49.5)	11.8 (53.2)	8.1 (46.6)
Mean minimum °C (°F)	7.6 (45.7)	6.9 (44.4)	5.5 (41.9)	2.8 (37.0)	−0.4 (31.3)	−2.0 (28.4)	−2.5 (27.5)	−1.4 (29.5)	0.2 (32.4)	2.2 (36.0)	3.9 (39.0)	6.0 (42.8)	−3.0 (26.6)
Record low °C (°F)	4.4 (39.9)	4.4 (39.9)	1.9 (35.4)	0.0 (32.0)	−3.1 (26.4)	−6.0 (21.2)	−3.8 (25.2)	−3.4 (25.9)	−2.2 (28.0)	−1.3 (29.7)	1.0 (33.8)	0.8 (33.4)	−6.0 (21.2)
Average rainfall mm (inches)	40.9 (1.61)	34.8 (1.37)	49.3 (1.94)	60.0 (2.36)	61.9 (2.44)	51.8 (2.04)	71.4 (2.81)	50.1 (1.97)	33.9 (1.33)	45.6 (1.80)	43.1 (1.70)	44.0 (1.73)	586.8 (23.1)
Source: NIWA
