= Avondale, New Zealand =

Avondale, New Zealand may refer to:

- Avondale, Auckland, a suburb of Auckland City
- Avondale, Canterbury, a suburb of Christchurch
