= Haeata Community Campus =

School in Christchurch, New Zealand

Location
- 240 Breezes Road; Wainoni; Christchurch 8061; New Zealand; 43.5150°S 172.6958°E

Information
- Funding type: State
- Established: 2017
- Ministry of Education Institution no.: 704
- Principal: Peggy Burrows
- Years offered: 1–13
- Gender: Coeducational
- Enrolment: 604 (July 2026)
- Website: www.haeata.school.nz

Haeata Community Campus is a school in the suburb of Wainoni, in Christchurch New Zealand. It opened on 3 February 2017 with an initial roll of 955 from the closure of four schools: Aranui Primary, Avondale Primary, Wainoni School, and Aranui High. The principal is Peggy Burrows.

== Enrolment ==
As of July 2026, Haeata Community Campus has roll of 604 students, of whom 295 (48.8%) identify as Māori.

As of 2026, the school has an Equity Index of 545, placing it amongst schools whose students have the most socioeconomic barriers to achievement (roughly equivalent to deciles 1 and 2 under the former socio-economic decile system).

== History ==
=== Founding ===
Haeata Community Campus was established in early 2017 through the merger of the former Aranui High School, Aranui, Wainoni and Avondale primary schools. The new school was built with separate junior and senior school blocks, a library and a performing arts centre for up to 650 people. Haeata was built at a cost of NZ$298 million under a public-private partnership deal, with facilities including a gymnasium, café, student services centre, science labs, wood works facility and open space classrooms.

The school opened on 3 February 2017, with Andy Kai Fong serving as its first principal. Prime Minister Bill English and Education Minister Hekia Parata attended the school's opening ceremony. By March 2017, Haeata had reached 950 students, exceeding its expected roll of 900 students. Consequently, the school hired four extra teachers.

=== Peggy Burrows, 2020–present ===
In March 2020, Peggy Burrows succeeded Kai Fong as the school's principal. In December 2025, a report released by the office of the Controller and Auditor-General of New Zealand found that Haeata Community Campus had spent $18,500 from its coaching and well-being budget on a 2024 trip to Queenstown by its senior leadership team to attend a leadership conference for schools within the Public-Private Partnership network. Under 2023-2024 collective agreements, principals were allocated a maximum of $6,000 for professional development or well-being support. In response, Burrows defended the trip, saying it was transparent and had been approved by the school's board

==== 2025 food poisoning incident ====
In early December 2025, the school reported that a batch of lunches provided by School Lunch Collective contractor Compass Group were "mouldy and liquefied." The school's principal Peggy Burrows reported that several students had experienced diarrhoea and food poisoning. The Collective and New Zealand Food Safety (NZFS) launched an investigation with the school. On 10 December, the NZFS investigation cleared the School Lunch Collective of wrongdoing, concluding that meals which had been delivered the previous week were accidentally mixed with hot meals that were served on 1 December. The investigators determined that it was unlikely that the Collective had accidentally delivered contaminated meals. On 5 February 2026, Haeata released its own internal investigation which challenged NZ Food Safety's finding that the contaminated meals came from the school. In response, NZFS deputy director-general Vincent Arbuckle defended his agency's investigation and said that Haeata's report did not introduce any new evidence.

== Principals ==
Since its opening in 2017, Haeata Community Campus has been led by the following principals:

- 2017–2019: Andy Kai Fong
- 2020–present: Peggy Burrows
