= Wainoni =

Wainoni is the name of two places in New Zealand:

- Wainoni, Auckland, a suburb of Auckland
- Wainoni, Christchurch, a suburb of Christchurch, Canterbury
