= Aranui =

Suburb of Christchurch, New Zealand

- Suburb
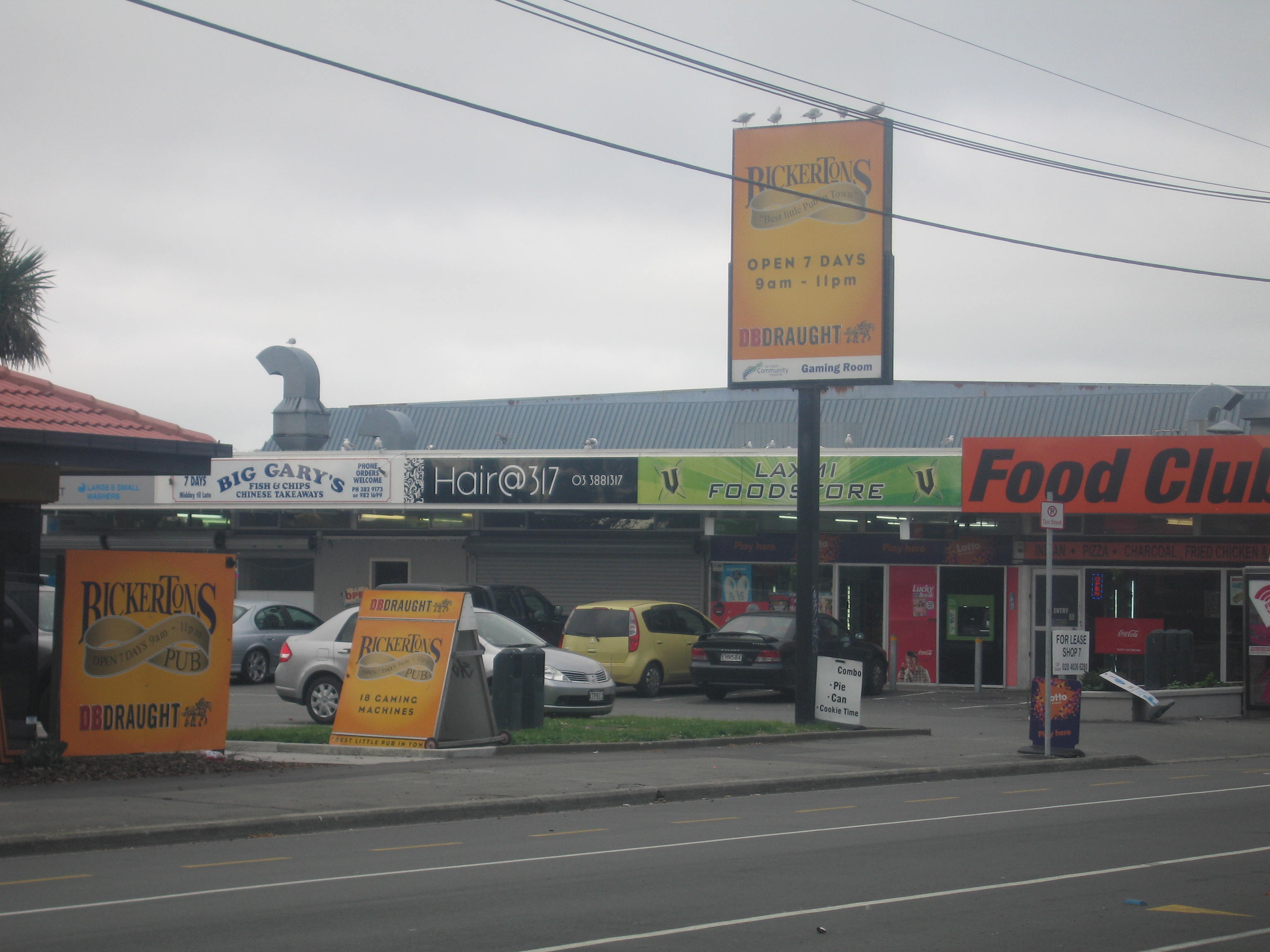
- Aranui shops on Pages Road
- Interactive map of Aranui
- Coordinates: 43°30′33″S 172°42′22″E
- Country: New Zealand
- City: Christchurch
- Local authority: Christchurch City Council
- Electoral ward: Burwood
- Community board: Waitai Coastal-Burwood-Linwood

Area
  - Land: 142 ha (350 acres)

Population (June 2025)
  - Total: 4,520
  - Density: 3,180/km^{2} (8,240/sq mi)

Avondale	(Residential red zone)
	Aranui	(Residential red zone)
Wainoni	Bexley

Aranui is one of the eastern suburbs of Christchurch. It is a low socio-economic area. In its early years, Aranui grew along Pages Road, the suburb's main road. Aranui soon became a working-class suburb. There are also areas of light-industrial premises in Aranui.

The suburb grew rapidly between 1945 and 1951. The area is predominantly residential with pockets of light industry. A large number of state houses were built in the suburb after the World War II. There are shops and service facilities at the intersection of Breezes Road and Pages Road and a smaller retail precinct centred on Hampshire Street. It is served by the composite school Haeata Community Campus in Wainoni, which was created by a merger of four schools in 2017. Aranui is part of the Christchurch East parliamentary electorate.

== History ==
Part of the area was previously called Flemington, named after the hairdresser and tobacconist Jubal Fleming (c.1844–1903). Fleming had a subdivision at the corner of Breezes and Pages Roads, and the tram stop on Breezes Road was informally called Flemington. The post office was established in 1912 and it was named Aranui by George Kyngdon Burton (c.1859–1957), with that name then applied to the wider area. Aranui is a Māori word, with ara meaning path and nui meaning great.

In its early years, the New Brighton Tramway Company extended the Linwood Cemetery route. Land in Aranui was cheap at the time, though infertile for agriculture purposes, and transportation so that settlement in Aranui increased.

Aranui soon became a working class suburb. There are also areas of light-industrial premises in Aranui. The suburb grew rapidly between 1945 and 1951 from 404 to 1,141 dwellers. Local shopping centres were established around Christchurch, particularly in some of the neighbourhoods which had large state-housing developments. Today, the suburb is mainly residential, though it has areas of retail businesses sited on Pages Road. There is also a smaller retail precinct centred on Hampshire Street.

A large number of state houses were built in Aranui after the World War II. Residents are still generally of low socio-economic status. A 2020 report by Kāinga Ora of the Burwood ward, revealed the suburb of Aranui had the highest number of state-owned houses in Christchurch.

== Geography ==
In the 19th century, much of the area consisted of rough grass and sand hills. Today, Aranui is one of the eastern suburbs. Its eastern boundary is the Avon River. Boundary roads are Pages Road in the south, Breezes Road in the west, and Wainoni Road in the north. Bexley is located to the south of Pages Road.

Aranui and its neighbouring suburb of Wainoni are sometimes considered together. Christchurch City Council publishes a combined community profile for the two suburbs. Other suburbs nearby include New Brighton and Avondale.

== Governance ==
The Christchurch City Council administers Aranui. The suburb is part of the Burwood Ward for Christchurch City Council local body elections. The currently elected councillor is Kelly Barber. Nationally, Aranui is part of the Christchurch East parliamentary electorate. The currently elected member of parliament is Reuben Davidson of the Labour Party. Historically, Christchurch East has supported the Labour Party in general elections and is considered one of Labour's safest seats.

== Demographics ==
Aranui covers 1.42 km^{2} (0.55 sq mi). It had an estimated population of 4,520 as of June 2025, with a population density of 3,183 people per km^{2}.

Historical population
Year	Pop.	±% p.a.
2006	4,260	—
2013	3,777	−1.70%
2018	4,200	+2.15%
2023	4,314	+0.54%

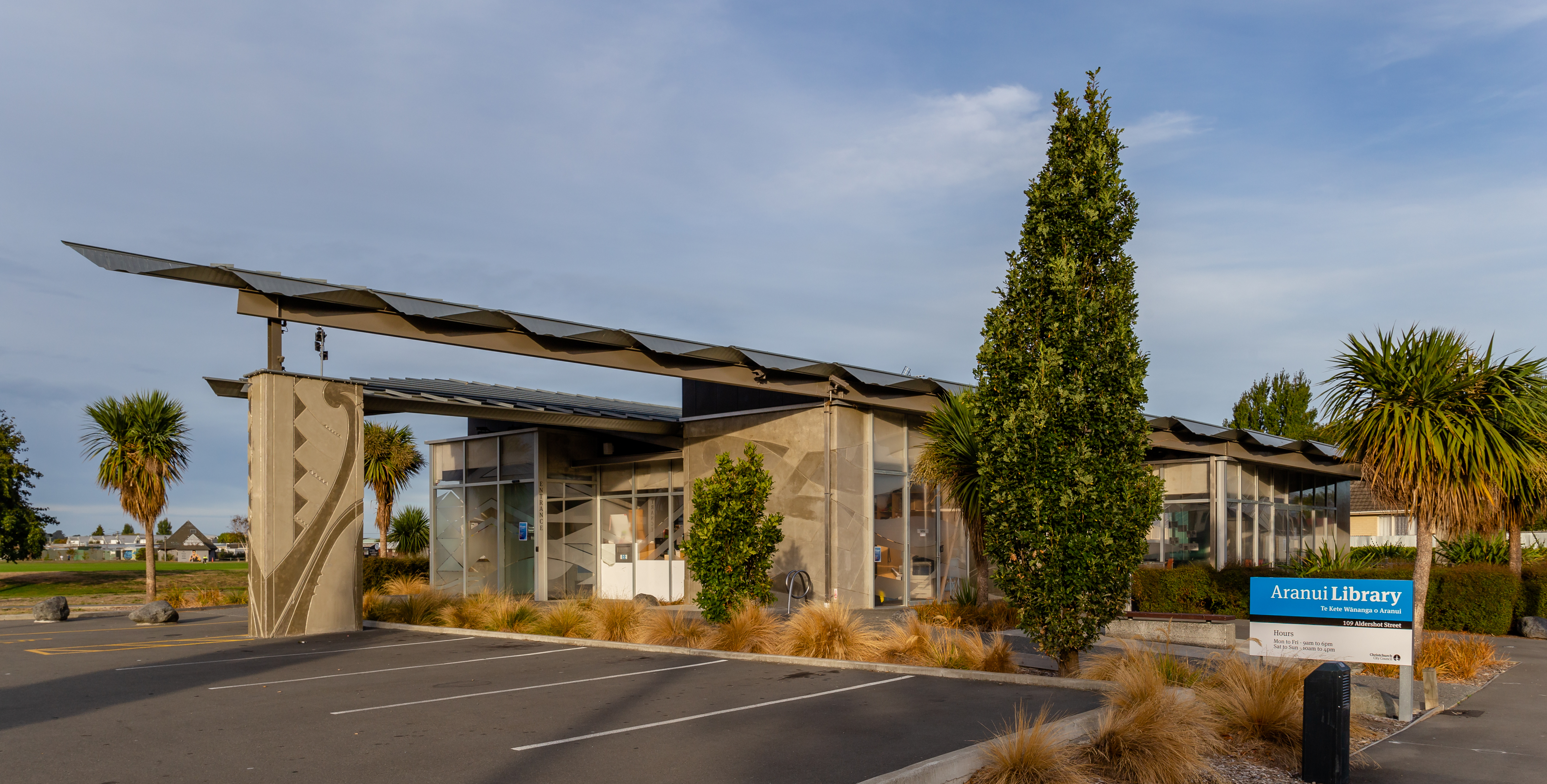
Aranui Library

Aranui had a population of 4,314 in the 2023 New Zealand census, an increase of 114 people (2.7%) since the 2018 census, and an increase of 537 people (14.2%) since the 2013 census. There were 2,190 males, 2,091 females, and 30 people of other genders in 1,443 dwellings. 3.5% of people identified as LGBTIQ+. The median age was 32.4 years (compared with 38.1 years nationally). There were 996 people (23.1%) aged under 15 years, 984 (22.8%) aged 15 to 29, 1,908 (44.2%) aged 30 to 64, and 423 (9.8%) aged 65 or older.

People could identify as more than one ethnicity. The results were 65.5% European (Pākehā); 32.3% Māori; 18.4% Pasifika; 6.3% Asian; 0.7% Middle Eastern, Latin American and African New Zealanders (MELAA); and 2.2% other, which includes people giving their ethnicity as "New Zealander". English was spoken by 95.5%, Māori by 8.4%, Samoan by 8.8%, and other languages by 6.1%. No language could be spoken by 2.0% (e.g. too young to talk). New Zealand Sign Language was known by 1.3%. The percentage of people born overseas was 14.8, compared with 28.8% nationally.

Religious affiliations were 29.4% Christian, 1.0% Hindu, 0.3% Islam, 2.2% Māori religious beliefs, 0.5% Buddhist, 1.0% New Age, 0.1% Jewish, and 1.3% other religions. People who answered that they had no religion were 57.3%, and 7.3% of people did not answer the census question.

Of those at least 15 years old, 228 (6.9%) people had a bachelor's or higher degree, 1,731 (52.2%) had a post-high school certificate or diploma, and 1,356 (40.9%) people exclusively held high school qualifications. The median income was $29,100, compared with $41,500 nationally. 60 people (1.8%) earned over $100,000 compared to 12.1% nationally. The employment status of those at least 15 was 1,434 (43.2%) full-time, 357 (10.8%) part-time, and 192 (5.8%) unemployed.

== Education ==
Aranui is served by the composite school Haeata Community Campus in Wainoni, which was created by a merger of four schools in 2017. Haeata Community Campus has a roll of 604 students as of July 2026. It was created by merging Aranui, Avondale and Wainoni Schools onto the former Aranui High School site.

== Notable people ==
- Tusiata Avia, a poet and children's author
- Mabel Howard, New Zealand's first woman cabinet minister, was once a resident in the area.
- Keri Hulme, a novelist and poet, was educated in Aranui High School and lived in the suburb for a short period of time.
- Ladi6, singer and songwriter, grew up in Aranui.
- Scribe, rapper
- Duncan Webb, lawyer and politician
