= Bexley, New Zealand =

Suburb of Christchurch, New Zealand

Bexley
- Suburb
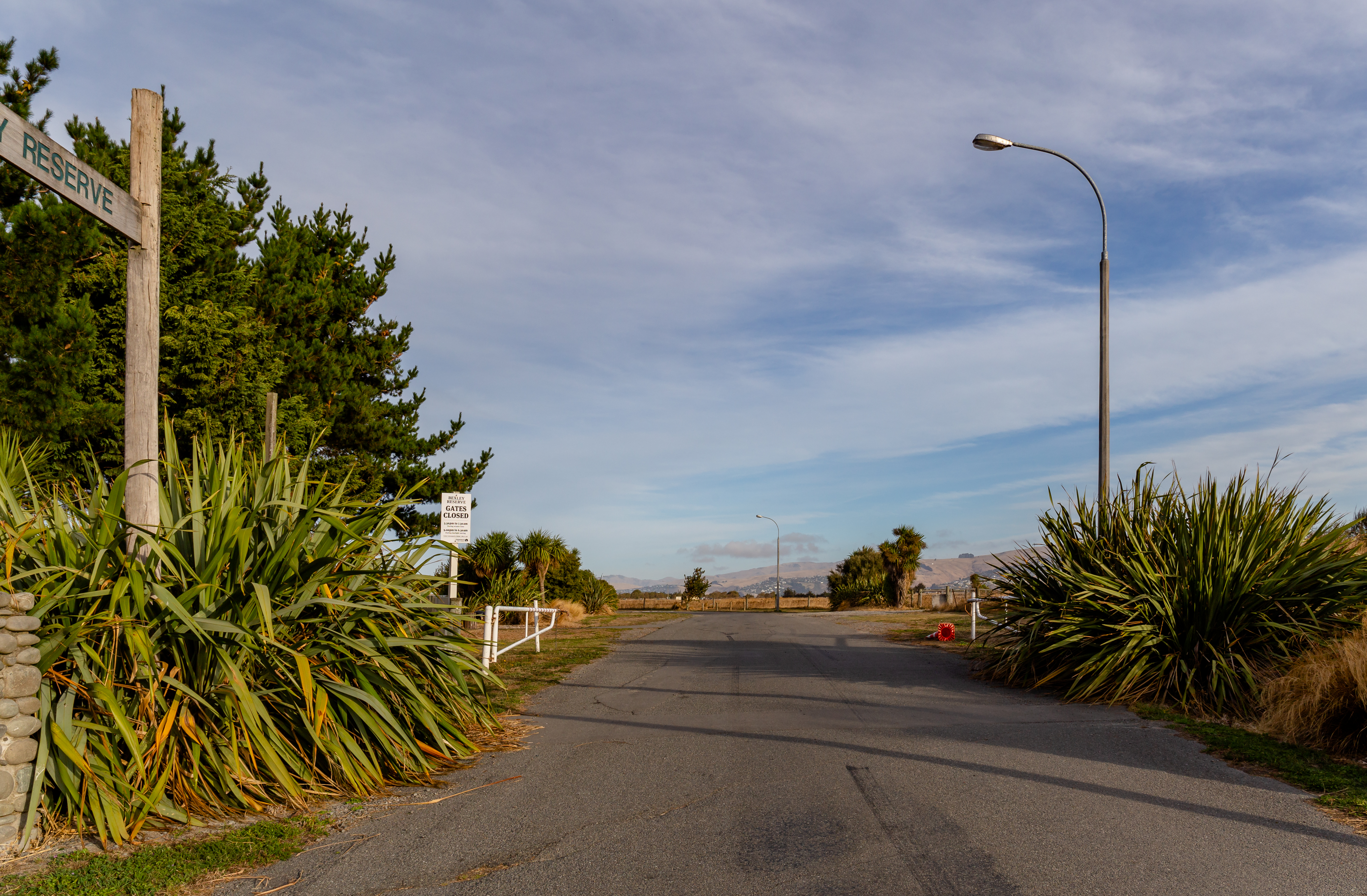
- Bexley Reserve
- Interactive map of Bexley
- Coordinates: 43°30′50″S 172°42′50″E
- Country: New Zealand
- City: Christchurch
- Local authority: Christchurch City Council
- Electoral ward: Linwood
- Community board: Waitai Coastal-Burwood-Linwood

Area
  - Land: 90 ha (220 acres)

Population (June 2025)
  - Total: 2,710
  - Density: 3,000/km^{2} (7,800/sq mi)

	Aranui
Wainoni	Bexley	(Residential red zone)
	Bromley

Bexley is an eastern suburb of Christchurch, New Zealand. It is located on the right bank of the Avon River / Ōtākaro approximately one kilometre from the Avon Heathcote Estuary. It is enclosed within a bend in the Avon River / Ōtākaro and borders the suburb of Aranui.

== Geography ==
Bexley is one of the eastern suburbs. Its eastern boundary is the Avon River / Ōtākaro. Boundary roads are Pages Road in the north, Shuttle Drive in the west, and Cuthberts Road, Breezes Road and Bridge Street in the south. Bexley was substantially damaged in the February 2011 earthquake, with approximately 90% of homes in the area needing to be demolished, mostly due to the effects of liquefaction, and placed in a residential red zone. Much of the suburb is now recreational open space. Aranui is located to the north of Pages Road.

== Earthquake damage ==
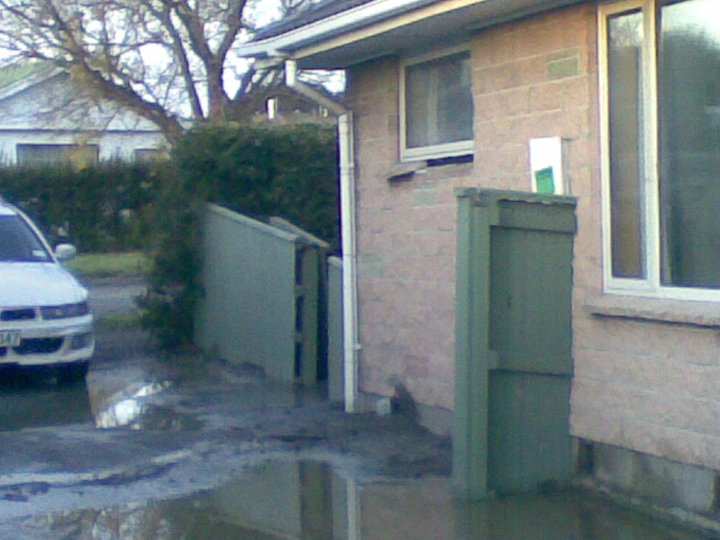
Liquefaction has caused this house to sink after the Christchurch earthquakes.

In the earthquake of September 2010 over 100 houses in the suburb were rendered uninhabitable by silt and subsidence due to soil liquefaction.

Flooding from soil liquefaction again caused serious flooding, and damaged roads and services in February 2011 from the 2011 Christchurch earthquake.

In June 2011, the government announced that for a number of areas in Christchurch "There is significant and extensive area wide land damage; The success of engineering solutions may be uncertain in terms of design, its success and possible commencement, given the ongoing seismic activity; and, Any repair would be disruptive and protracted for landowners." As a result, the government offered to purchase the properties owned in this and similar areas for their pre-quake rateable value. Bexley and other affected areas have been classified as part of Christchurch's residential red zone.

== Demographics ==
Bexley covers 0.90 km^{2} (0.35 sq mi). It had an estimated population of 2,710 as of June 2025, with a population density of 3,011 people per km^{2}.

Historical population
Year	Pop.	±% p.a.
2006	2,565	—
2013	2,244	−1.89%
2018	2,553	+2.61%
2023	2,619	+0.51%

Bexley had a population of 2,619 in the 2023 New Zealand census, an increase of 66 people (2.6%) since the 2018 census, and an increase of 375 people (16.7%) since the 2013 census. There were 1,329 males, 1,275 females, and 15 people of other genders in 957 dwellings. 4.8% of people identified as LGBTIQ+. The median age was 34.5 years (compared with 38.1 years nationally). There were 528 people (20.2%) aged under 15 years, 576 (22.0%) aged 15 to 29, 1,188 (45.4%) aged 30 to 64, and 330 (12.6%) aged 65 or older.

People could identify as more than one ethnicity. The results were 75.5% European (Pākehā); 27.5% Māori; 12.4% Pasifika; 6.8% Asian; 0.6% Middle Eastern, Latin American and African New Zealanders (MELAA); and 2.6% other, which includes people giving their ethnicity as "New Zealander". English was spoken by 96.4%, Māori by 6.5%, Samoan by 4.5%, and other languages by 6.0%. No language could be spoken by 2.5% (e.g. too young to talk). New Zealand Sign Language was known by 0.7%. The percentage of people born overseas was 14.4, compared with 28.8% nationally.

Religious affiliations were 26.3% Christian, 0.5% Hindu, 0.3% Islam, 0.9% Māori religious beliefs, 0.3% Buddhist, 0.9% New Age, and 1.4% other religions. People who answered that they had no religion were 61.1%, and 8.1% of people did not answer the census question.

Of those at least 15 years old, 174 (8.3%) people had a bachelor's or higher degree, 1,098 (52.5%) had a post-high school certificate or diploma, and 825 (39.5%) people exclusively held high school qualifications. The median income was $33,900, compared with $41,500 nationally. 48 people (2.3%) earned over $100,000 compared to 12.1% nationally. The employment status of those at least 15 was 987 (47.2%) full-time, 246 (11.8%) part-time, and 87 (4.2%) unemployed.
