= Wainoni, Christchurch =

Suburb of Christchurch, New Zealand

Wainoni
- Suburb
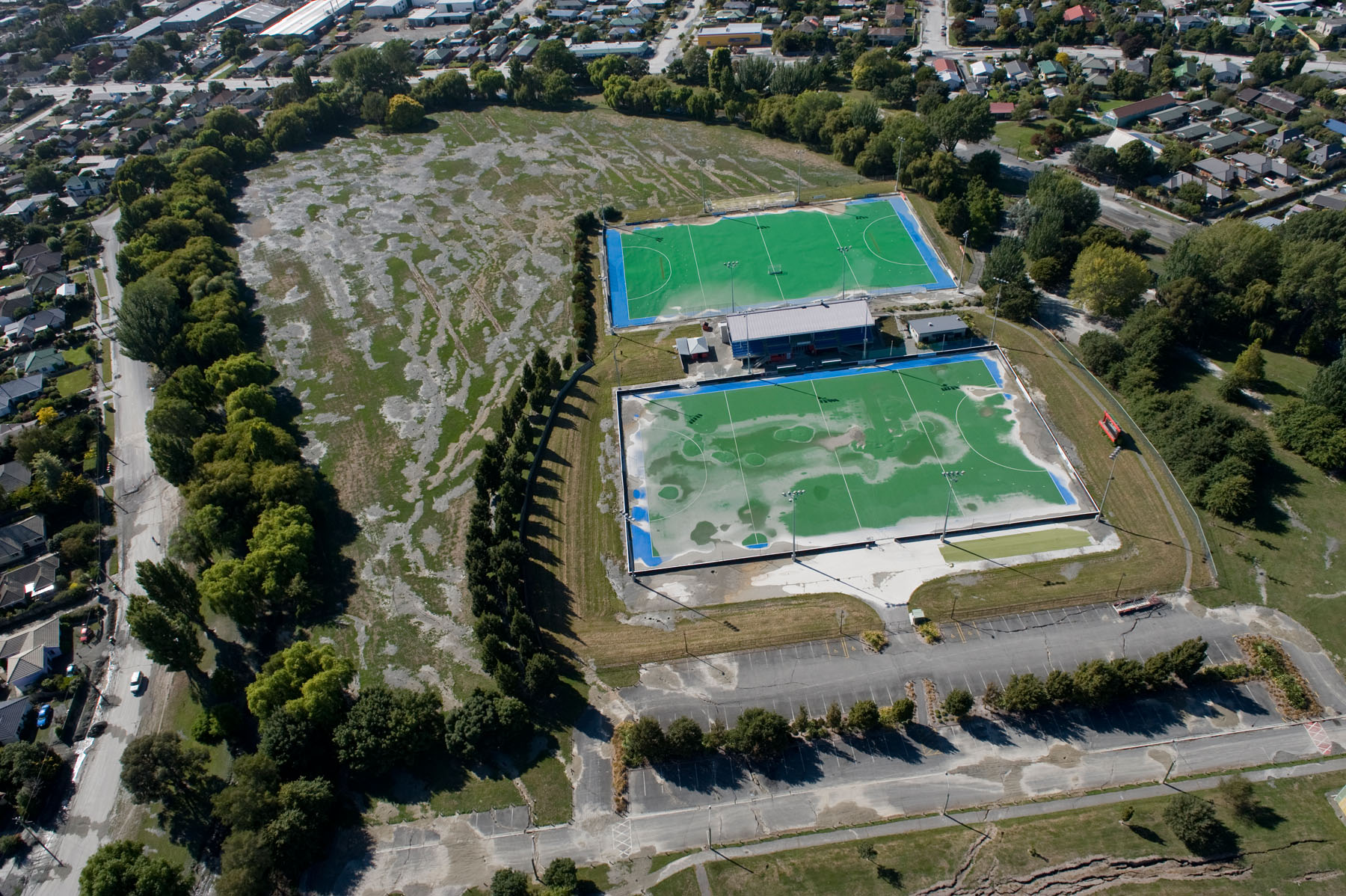
- Aerial view of Porritt Park after the February 2011 Christchurch earthquake, showing extensive soil liquefaction
- Interactive map of Wainoni
- Coordinates: 43°31′0″S 172°41′30″E
- Country: New Zealand
- City: Christchurch
- Local authority: Christchurch City Council
- Electoral ward: Burwood; Linwood
- Community board: Waitai Coastal-Burwood-Linwood

Area
  - Land: 152 ha (380 acres)

Population (June 2025)
  - Total: 3,020
  - Density: 1,990/km^{2} (5,150/sq mi)

(Residential red zone)	Avondale	Aranui
Avonside	Wainoni	Bexley
Linwood		Bromley

Wainoni is one of the eastern suburbs of Christchurch. It is a lower socio-economic area.

== Etymology ==
Wainoni is a Māori word, with wai meaning stream and noni meaning a bend or turn. The name was applied by Alexander William Bickerton to his new home on the Avon River.

== History ==
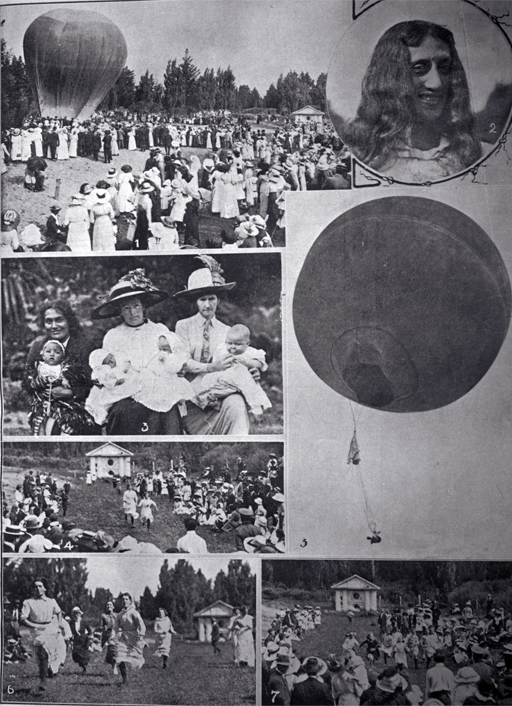
Annual gala at Wainoni Park, 1914

In 1884, Bickerton and his family moved into a new home near New Brighton, Christchurch that he named Wainoni. Bickerton, who purchased a 30 acres (12 ha) property around what is now Bickerton Street, accepted, in 1874, the post of foundation professor of chemistry at Canterbury College. It became a centre for the social life of students at the Canterbury College. The property included a small theatre, a vast garden, and fireworks displays for entertainment. Bickerton's idea for the property was to create a new form of society based around his socialist beliefs, however this social experiment was discontinued after several years. From 1903 the property was turned more into a theme park to provide family income, with a zoo, 7,000 person amphitheatre, conservatory, aquariums, cinema, medicine and fireworks factories, and mock naval battles on a man-made lake. It attracted hundreds of thousands of people over the coming years. In the end the Pleasure Gardens, as they were called, started running at a loss and was closed by 1914.

The suburb developed for housing during the 1960s.

== Geography ==
Porritt Park, an old loop of the Avon River, lies within Wainoni. Going clockwise from there, boundary roads of the suburb are Wainoni, Breezes, Pages, and Kerrs Roads. Wainoni is approximately 7 kilometres (4.3 mi) from the central city. Wainoni Park is located in the adjacent suburb of Aranui.

Wainoni and its neighbouring suburb of Aranui are often considered together and intermixed. For example, Wainoni School and Wainoni Park are located in Aranui, and the now closed Aranui High School was located in Wainoni. Christchurch City Council publishes a combined community profile for the two suburbs.

== Demographics ==
Wainoni covers 1.52 km^{2} (0.59 sq mi). It had an estimated population of 3,020 as of June 2025, with a population density of 1,987 people per km^{2}.

Historical population
Year	Pop.	±% p.a.
2006	2,859	—
2013	2,694	−0.85%
2018	2,799	+0.77%
2023	2,868	+0.49%

Wainoni had a population of 2,868 in the 2023 New Zealand census, an increase of 69 people (2.5%) since the 2018 census, and an increase of 174 people (6.5%) since the 2013 census. There were 1,452 males, 1,395 females, and 21 people of other genders in 1,110 dwellings. 5.0% of people identified as LGBTIQ+. The median age was 35.8 years (compared with 38.1 years nationally). There were 531 people (18.5%) aged under 15 years, 606 (21.1%) aged 15 to 29, 1,338 (46.7%) aged 30 to 64, and 393 (13.7%) aged 65 or older.

People could identify as more than one ethnicity. The results were 75.6% European (Pākehā); 23.1% Māori; 9.1% Pasifika; 10.9% Asian; 1.5% Middle Eastern, Latin American and African New Zealanders (MELAA); and 2.0% other, which includes people giving their ethnicity as "New Zealander". English was spoken by 95.9%, Māori by 6.4%, Samoan by 3.2%, and other languages by 10.4%. No language could be spoken by 2.3% (e.g. too young to talk). New Zealand Sign Language was known by 1.0%. The percentage of people born overseas was 17.7, compared with 28.8% nationally.

Religious affiliations were 28.7% Christian, 1.6% Hindu, 0.9% Islam, 1.8% Māori religious beliefs, 0.3% Buddhist, 0.8% New Age, 0.1% Jewish, and 1.8% other religions. People who answered that they had no religion were 56.0%, and 8.5% of people did not answer the census question.

Of those at least 15 years old, 327 (14.0%) people had a bachelor's or higher degree, 1,266 (54.2%) had a post-high school certificate or diploma, and 741 (31.7%) people exclusively held high school qualifications. The median income was $36,400, compared with $41,500 nationally. 63 people (2.7%) earned over $100,000 compared to 12.1% nationally. The employment status of those at least 15 was 1,179 (50.4%) full-time, 288 (12.3%) part-time, and 117 (5.0%) unemployed.

== Education ==
Haeata Community Campus is a coeducational composite school for years 1 to 13 with a roll of 604 students as of July 2026. It was created by merging Aranui School (primary school located in Aranui), Avondale School (primary school located in the neighbouring Avondale), Wainoni School (primary school in Aranui) and Aranui High School on the Aranui High site in January 2017.
