= Aranui High School =

Location
- Shortland Street, Wainoni, Christchurch; 43°30′58″S 172°41′44″E

Information
- Type: State, co-educational, secondary
- Established: 1960
- Status: Closed
- Closed: 2016
- Ministry of Education Institution no.: 323
- Enrolment: 338 (July 2016)
- Socio-economic decile: 2D

Aranui High School was a large secondary school for years 9–13, in Christchurch, New Zealand. Aranui High School took its name from the suburb of Aranui, meaning 'big pathway' in Māori. Aranui High School was a coeducational alternative to other secondary schools in Eastern Christchurch such as Linwood College and Mairehau High School.

Despite its name, the school was in the suburb of Wainoni. As part of the government's restructure of Christchurch schools following the 2011 Christchurch earthquake, the school's closure was announced in 2013. It closed in 2016, and Haeata Community Campus, a school taking year 1–13 pupils, opened on the campus from a merger of Aranui High School with Aranui, Wainoni, and Avondale primary schools.

== History ==
Established in 1960, the school quickly grew into one of Christchurch's largest secondary schools, with a peak roll of over 1600 students.

The school became a key community hub and helped to educate not only local Māori and Pasifika students, but also Pākehā (New Zealand European) and other ethnicities well beyond the Aranui community limits.

During the magnitude 6.3 earthquake on 22 February, the school suffered only moderate damage but was forced to close for nearly a month. As a result of the earthquake the school experienced a significant decline in enrolment.

In 2013, Education Minister Hekia Parata announced that Aranui High School would be merged with local primary schools, including Wainoni, Aranui and Avondale Primary, to form a year 1–13 community campus. Aranui High School closed on 15 December 2016.

== Houses ==
- Kahikatea
- Kauri
- Kowhai
- Rimu

== Notable staff ==
- Marian Hobbs

=== Principals ===
During its existence, Aranui High School had eight principals. The following is a complete list:

	Name	Term
1	Bill Brittenden	1960–1971
2	Arch Gilchrist	1972–1978
3	Norman Sinclair	1978–1983
4	John Grigor	1983–1988
5	Graeme Plummer	1989–2000
6	Graeme Pollock	2000–2005
7	John Rohs	2006–2015
8	Maree Furness	2016

== Notable alumni ==
- Ben Franks, rugby player
- Keri Hulme, writer
- Miriama Kamo, television presenter, host and producer
- Stacey Morrison, TV and radio host
- Nigel Richards, 5-time World Champion Scrabble player
- Lea Tahuhu, cricketer
