= Chisnallwood Intermediate =

State school in Christchurch, New Zealand

Chisnallwood Intermediate School
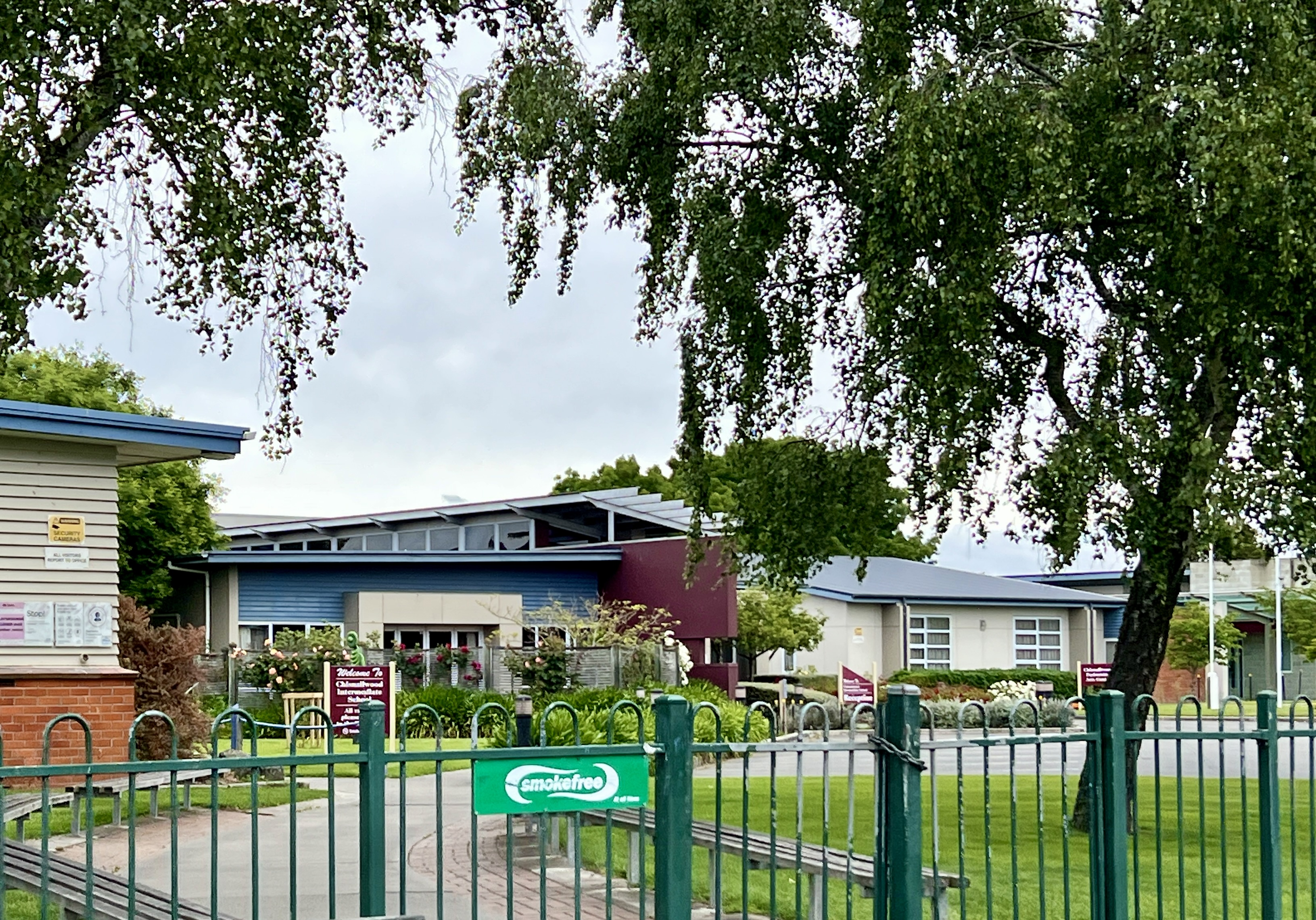

Location
- Breezes Road, Christchurch, New Zealand; 43.5102°S 172.6891°E

Information
- Type: State, Co-educational, Intermediate
- Ministry of Education Institution no.: 3314
- Principal: Todd Blake
- Enrolment: 410 (July 2026)
- Socio-economic decile: 5
- Website: chisnallwood.school.nz

Chisnallwood Intermediate is the main Intermediate school in the eastern suburbs of Christchurch, New Zealand. The school had a student roll of 833 students in 2008, which had shrunk to 631 by 2016. The school was recommended for closure or merger in the 2013 Christchurch school review commissioned by Education Minister Hekia Parata, but was spared.
