= Avondale, Christchurch =

Suburb of Christchurch, New Zealand

Avondale
- Suburb
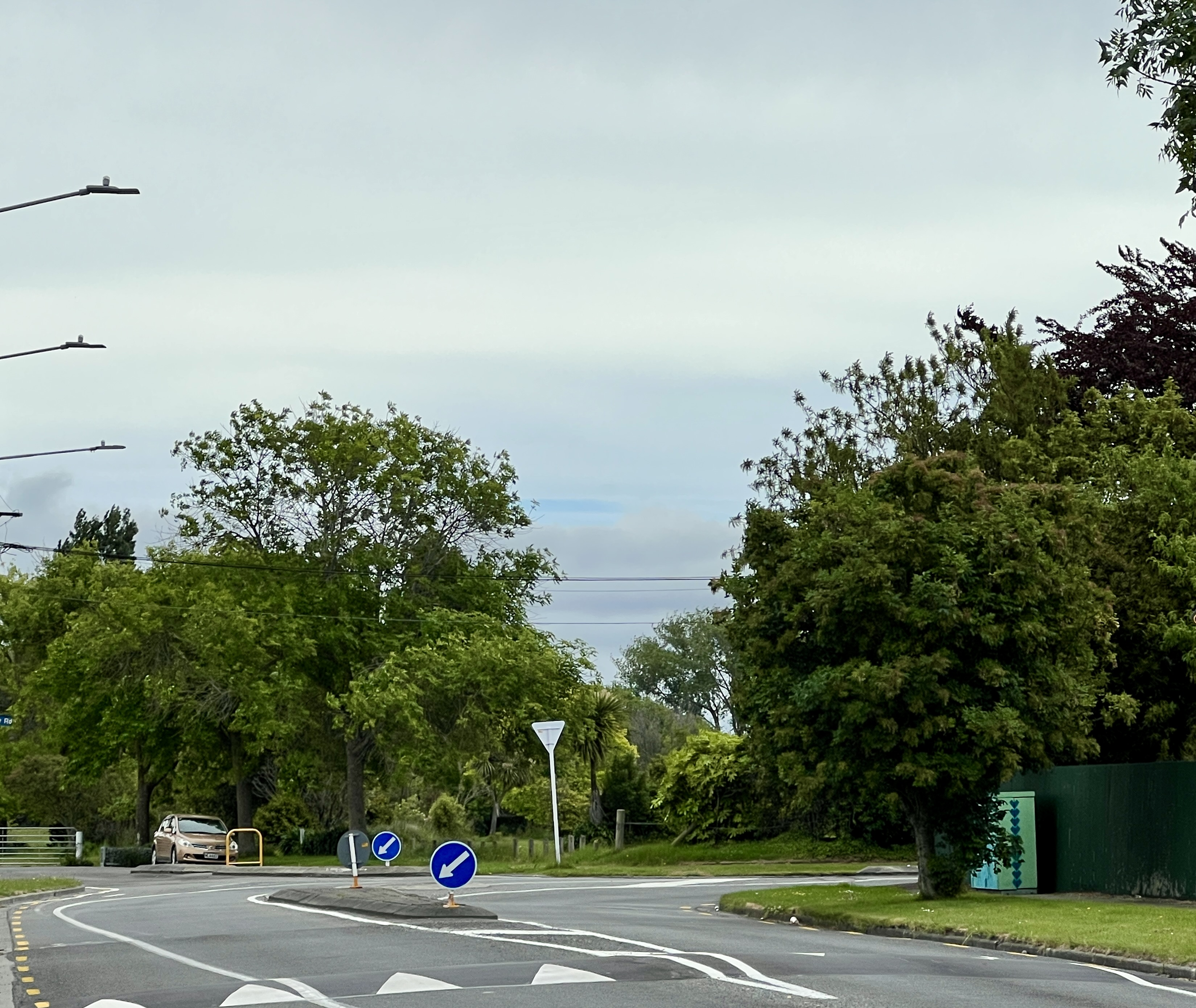
- Avondale in 2024, after much of its housing had been demolished and added to the residential red zone
- Interactive map of Avondale
- Coordinates: 43.5046°S 172.6938°E
- Country: New Zealand
- City: Christchurch
- Local authority: Christchurch City Council
- Electoral ward: Burwood
- Community board: Waitai Coastal-Burwood-Linwood

Area
  - Land: 125 ha (310 acres)

Population (June 2025)
  - Total: 2,600
  - Density: 2,100/km^{2} (5,400/sq mi)

	(Residential red zone)
(Residential red zone)	Avondale	Aranui
	Wainoni

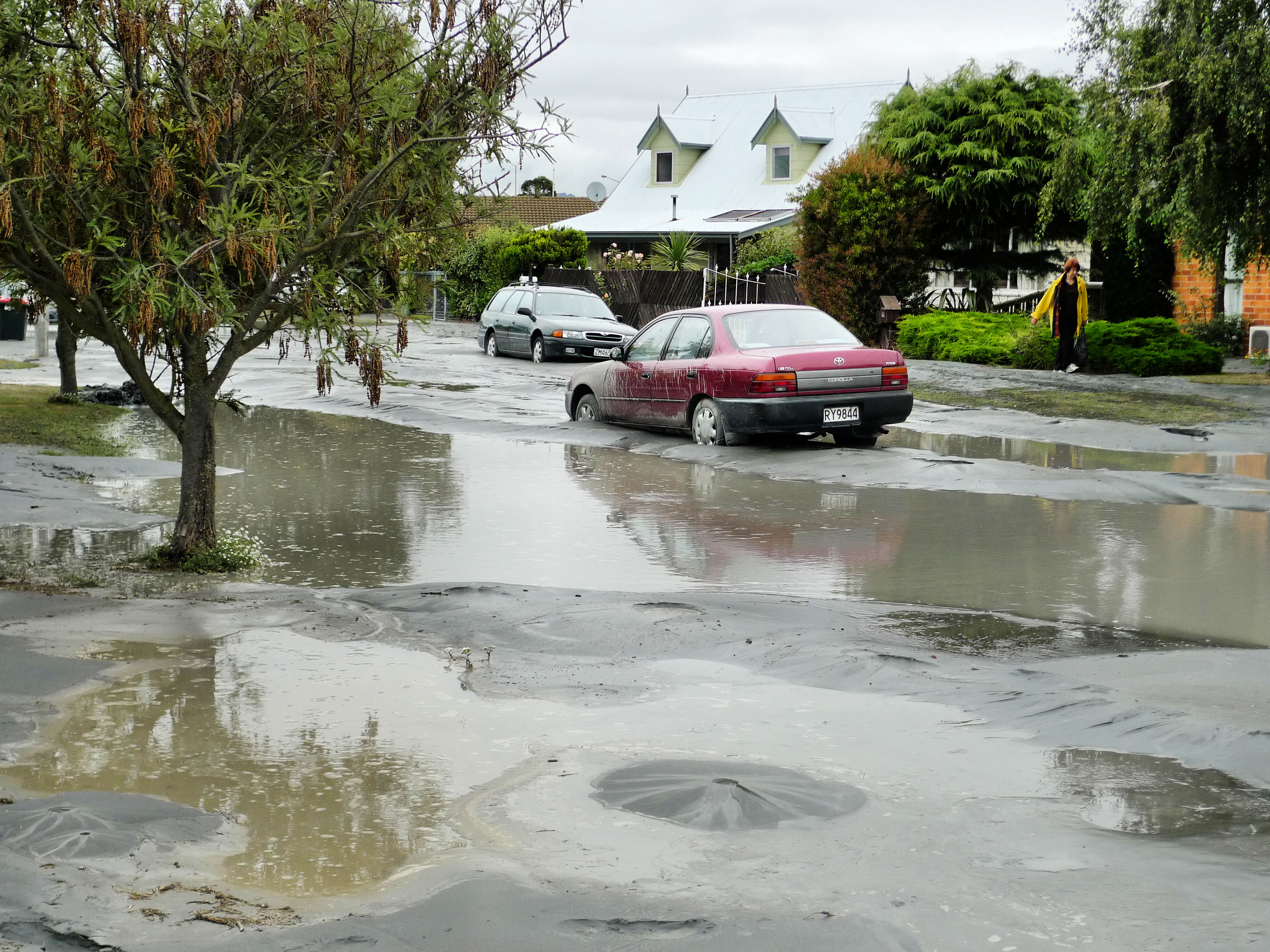
Example of extensive liquefaction during February 2011 earthquake

Avondale (/ˈeɪvəndeɪl/ AY-vən-dayl) is a suburb of Christchurch in the South Island of New Zealand. It is located 6 kilometres (3.7 mi) northeast of the city center, and is close to the Avon River / Ōtākaro, four kilometres to the northwest of its estuary. The suburb is centred on Avondale Road and so named due to its proximity to the Avon River. It has a good sized park on Mervyn Drive called Avondale Park. This park has a kids playground, a tennis court, basketball court, and a football field in winter. There is ample vacant red zone land in Avondale for activities such as leisure and dog walking.

== Canterbury earthquakes ==
During the 2010–2011 Christchurch earthquakes, Avondale was hit hard by damage to land and buildings due to soil liquefaction, part of Avondale was declared by the government as a residential red zone. This meant that the government considers rebuilding the infrastructure in such zone uneconomic, and the residents' properties were purchased by the government under what has been called a voluntary yet coercive scheme – while residents were free to refuse the government's buyout of their homes, the government cautioned that remaining in place would entail a lack of insurance, infrastructure, and city services. The government's red zone declaration was ruled as unlawful by the High Court in August 2013 on the grounds that it was not pursuant to the Canterbury Earthquake Recovery Act.

Many roads remain damaged in Avondale as of 2014, posing a problem for residents, and the Avon river's banks had to be built up in the suburb to avoid flooding. Portaloos were present on some streets due to destroyed sewers. Building, sewer and road reparations are currently underway in the suburb.

== Demographics ==
Avondale covers 1.25 km^{2} (0.48 sq mi). It had an estimated population of 2,600 as of June 2025, with a population density of 2,080 people per km^{2}.

Historical population
Year	Pop.	±% p.a.
2006	2,733	—
2013	2,352	−2.12%
2018	2,373	+0.18%
2023	2,457	+0.70%

Avondale had a population of 2,457 in the 2023 New Zealand census, an increase of 84 people (3.5%) since the 2018 census, and an increase of 105 people (4.5%) since the 2013 census. There were 1,185 males, 1,260 females, and 12 people of other genders in 927 dwellings. 3.2% of people identified as LGBTIQ+. The median age was 36.7 years (compared with 38.1 years nationally). There were 468 people (19.0%) aged under 15 years, 474 (19.3%) aged 15 to 29, 1,170 (47.6%) aged 30 to 64, and 348 (14.2%) aged 65 or older.

People could identify as more than one ethnicity. The results were 82.8% European (Pākehā); 18.1% Māori; 8.1% Pasifika; 6.6% Asian; 1.2% Middle Eastern, Latin American and African New Zealanders (MELAA); and 2.2% other, which includes people giving their ethnicity as "New Zealander". English was spoken by 96.3%, Māori by 5.6%, Samoan by 2.2%, and other languages by 7.4%. No language could be spoken by 2.4% (e.g. too young to talk). New Zealand Sign Language was known by 1.1%. The percentage of people born overseas was 14.7, compared with 28.8% nationally.

Religious affiliations were 26.5% Christian, 1.3% Hindu, 0.6% Islam, 0.4% Māori religious beliefs, 0.5% Buddhist, 0.5% New Age, and 1.5% other religions. People who answered that they had no religion were 61.8%, and 7.0% of people did not answer the census question.

Of those at least 15 years old, 300 (15.1%) people had a bachelor's or higher degree, 1,134 (57.0%) had a post-high school certificate or diploma, and 555 (27.9%) people exclusively held high school qualifications. The median income was $42,600, compared with $41,500 nationally. 99 people (5.0%) earned over $100,000 compared to 12.1% nationally. The employment status of those at least 15 was 1,086 (54.6%) full-time, 225 (11.3%) part-time, and 69 (3.5%) unemployed.

== Education ==
Chisnallwood Intermediate is the main Intermediate school in the eastern suburbs, and is located in Avondale. It had a roll of 410 as of July 2026. Chisnallwood opened in 1967.
