= Horseshoe Lake (New Zealand) =

Horseshoe Lake is the name of four lakes in New Zealand.

== Horseshoe Lake, Hawke's Bay ==
This is a very small lake approximately 14 km east of Waipawa in the Hawke's Bay region of the North Island of New Zealand. 39°55′S 176°46′E

== Horseshoe Lake, Waikato ==
Also known as Waiwhakareke, this is a small lake in the western outskirts of Hamilton in the Waikato region of the North Island of New Zealand. 37°46′12″S 175°13′33″E

== Horseshoe Lake, Hurunui ==
This is a small lake approximately 27 km south west of Hanmer Springs in the Hurunui District of the Canterbury region of the South Island of New Zealand. 42°35′52.18″S 172°31′19.05″E

== Horseshoe Lake, Christchurch ==
This is a small urban lake in northeast Christchurch, close to the Avon River. The area within the curve of the lake is a nature reserve. 43°29′41.42″S 172°40′27.35″E
