= Dallington, New Zealand =

Suburb of Christchurch, New Zealand

Dallington
- Suburb
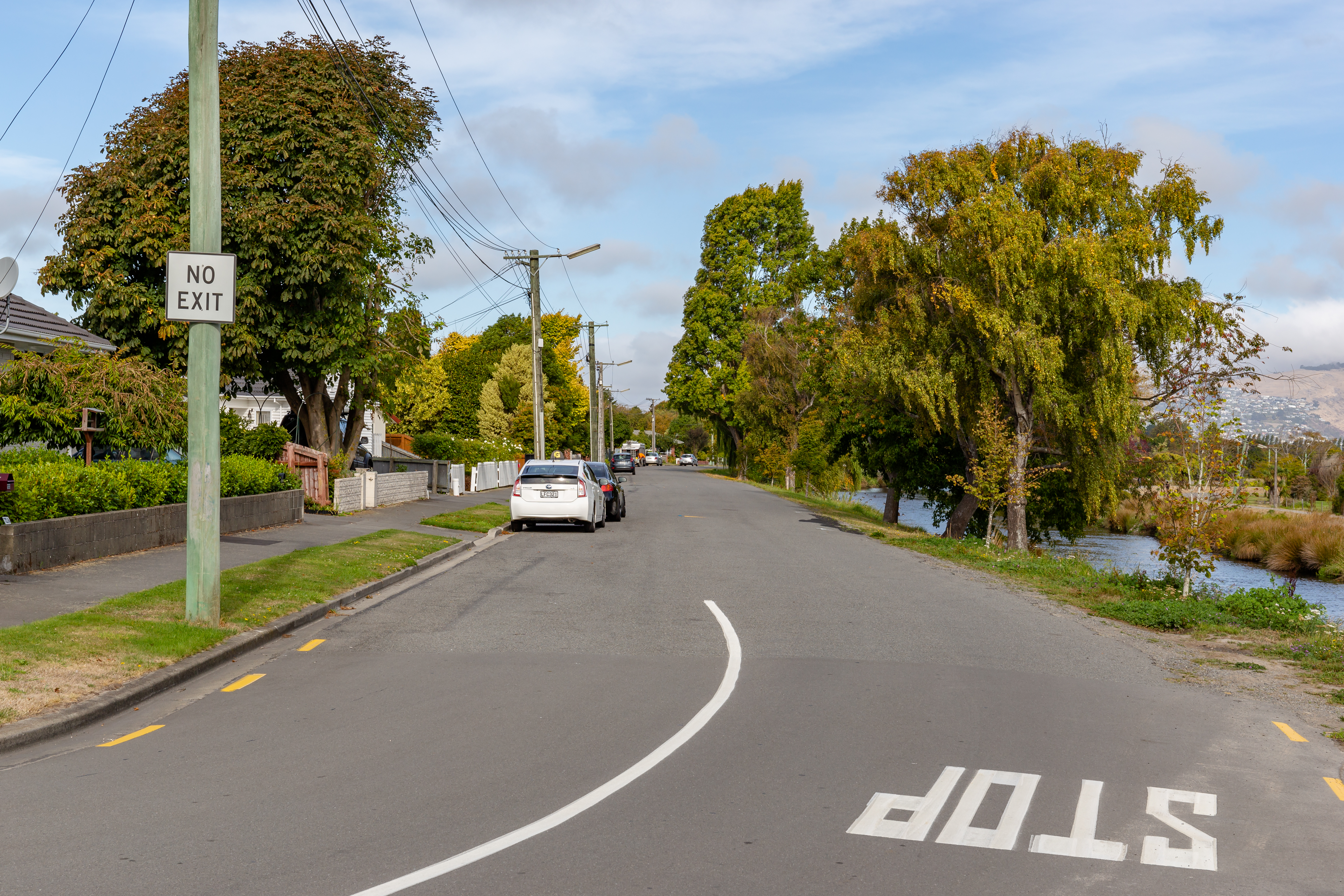
- Dallington Terrace
- Interactive map of Dallington
- Coordinates: 43.5136°S 172.674°E
- Country: New Zealand
- City: Christchurch
- Local authority: Christchurch City Council
- Electoral ward: Burwood
- Community board: Waitai Coastal-Burwood-Linwood

Area
  - Land: 83 ha (210 acres)

Population (June 2025)
  - Total: 2,560
  - Density: 3,100/km^{2} (8,000/sq mi)

	Shirley
Richmond	Dallington	(Residential red zone)
	(Residential red zone)

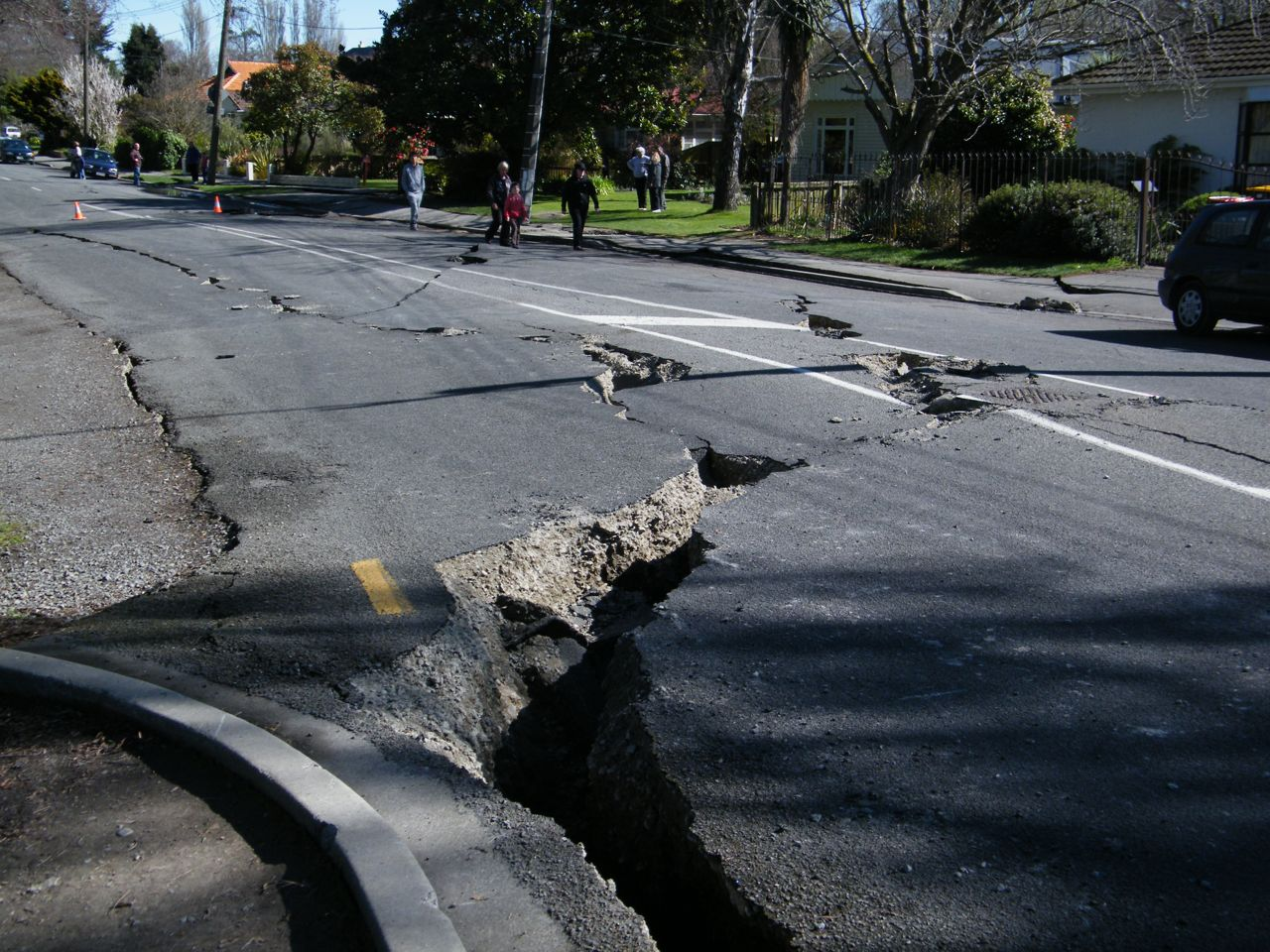
Earthquake damage at River Road

Dallington is a suburb of Christchurch, New Zealand, on the north-east side of the city.

It is bounded mainly by the Avon River / Ōtākaro, stretching in a circular area from the intersection of Gayhurst Road, Dallington Terrace and Locksley Avenue along to New Brighton Road, North Parade and Banks Avenue where it meets the intersection at the other end of Dallington Terrace and River Road. Its neighbouring suburbs are Burwood, Shirley, Richmond, and Avonside.

First mentioned in The Press in 1883 when "beautiful suburban villa sites on the banks of the Avon in the suburb of Dallington, lately known as Broom Farm" are advertised for sale by Henry Jekyll.

On 4 September 2010, it was severely hit by a 7.1 magnitude earthquake, causing immense damage. Consequently, the St Paul's parish church and school which had suffered greatly from the effects of the quake, were forced to relocate their church services to the Marian College chapel and the students to the Catholic Cathedral College site, for the following couple of years estimated that it would take to rebuild. The college accommodated the entire primary school community of St Paul's School for a short time. But the February 2011 Christchurch earthquake (6.3 magnitude) caused far worse devastation to the city than the September 2010 earthquake. Large areas of Dallington were placed into a residential red zone, under which houses were acquired and demolished by the Crown.

== Demographics ==
Dallington covers 0.83 km^{2} (0.32 sq mi). It had an estimated population of 2,560 as of June 2025, with a population density of 3,084 people per km^{2}.

Historical population
Year	Pop.	±% p.a.
2006	2,691	—
2013	2,220	−2.71%
2018	2,361	+1.24%
2023	2,427	+0.55%

Dallington had a population of 2,427 in the 2023 New Zealand census, an increase of 66 people (2.8%) since the 2018 census, and an increase of 207 people (9.3%) since the 2013 census. There were 1,209 males, 1,200 females, and 18 people of other genders in 984 dwellings. 4.7% of people identified as LGBTIQ+. The median age was 37.0 years (compared with 38.1 years nationally). There were 435 people (17.9%) aged under 15 years, 474 (19.5%) aged 15 to 29, 1,107 (45.6%) aged 30 to 64, and 408 (16.8%) aged 65 or older.

People could identify as more than one ethnicity. The results were 80.2% European (Pākehā); 15.3% Māori; 6.7% Pasifika; 8.9% Asian; 2.2% Middle Eastern, Latin American and African New Zealanders (MELAA); and 3.7% other, which includes people giving their ethnicity as "New Zealander". English was spoken by 95.7%, Māori by 3.1%, Samoan by 2.0%, and other languages by 10.4%. No language could be spoken by 2.6% (e.g. too young to talk). New Zealand Sign Language was known by 1.7%. The percentage of people born overseas was 21.5, compared with 28.8% nationally.

Religious affiliations were 30.9% Christian, 0.6% Hindu, 1.4% Islam, 0.6% Māori religious beliefs, 0.4% Buddhist, 0.7% New Age, and 2.0% other religions. People who answered that they had no religion were 55.6%, and 7.9% of people did not answer the census question.

Of those at least 15 years old, 405 (20.3%) people had a bachelor's or higher degree, 1,068 (53.6%) had a post-high school certificate or diploma, and 510 (25.6%) people exclusively held high school qualifications. The median income was $37,200, compared with $41,500 nationally. 111 people (5.6%) earned over $100,000 compared to 12.1% nationally. The employment status of those at least 15 was 954 (47.9%) full-time, 258 (13.0%) part-time, and 69 (3.5%) unemployed.

== Education ==
Pareawa Banks Avenue School is a contributing primary school catering for years 1 to 6. It had a roll of 357 as of July 2026. The school opened in 1956. In 2022, the school moved to a nearby site in the neighbouring suburb of Richmond.
