= Residential red zone =

Unhabitable areas around Christchurch, New Zealand

Coordinates: 43°30′21″S 172°40′47″E

A residential red zone is any of several areas of land in and around Christchurch, New Zealand, that experienced severe damage in the 2010 and 2011 Christchurch earthquakes and were deemed infeasible to rebuild on. Through voluntary buyouts, the Crown acquired and demolished or removed over 8,000 properties. The majority were located in a broad swath of the eastern suburbs along the Avon River / Ōtākaro that had suffered damage from soil liquefaction.

== Background ==
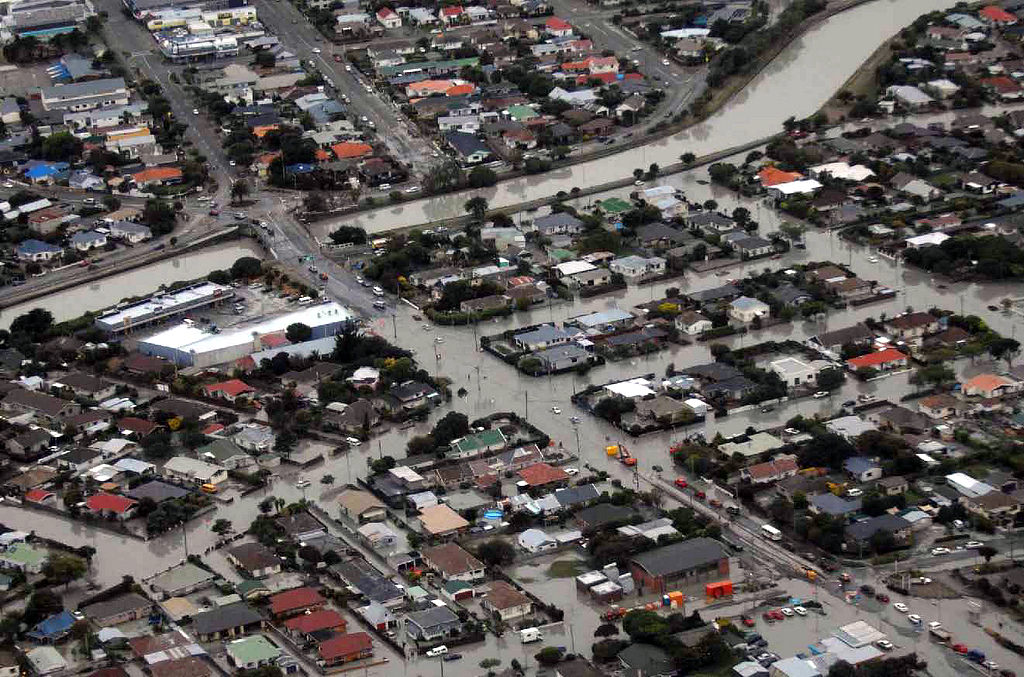
RNZAF aerial survey of damage, showing flooding due to soil liquefaction in Christchurch; most of the land in the image was later red-zoned and all structures demolished

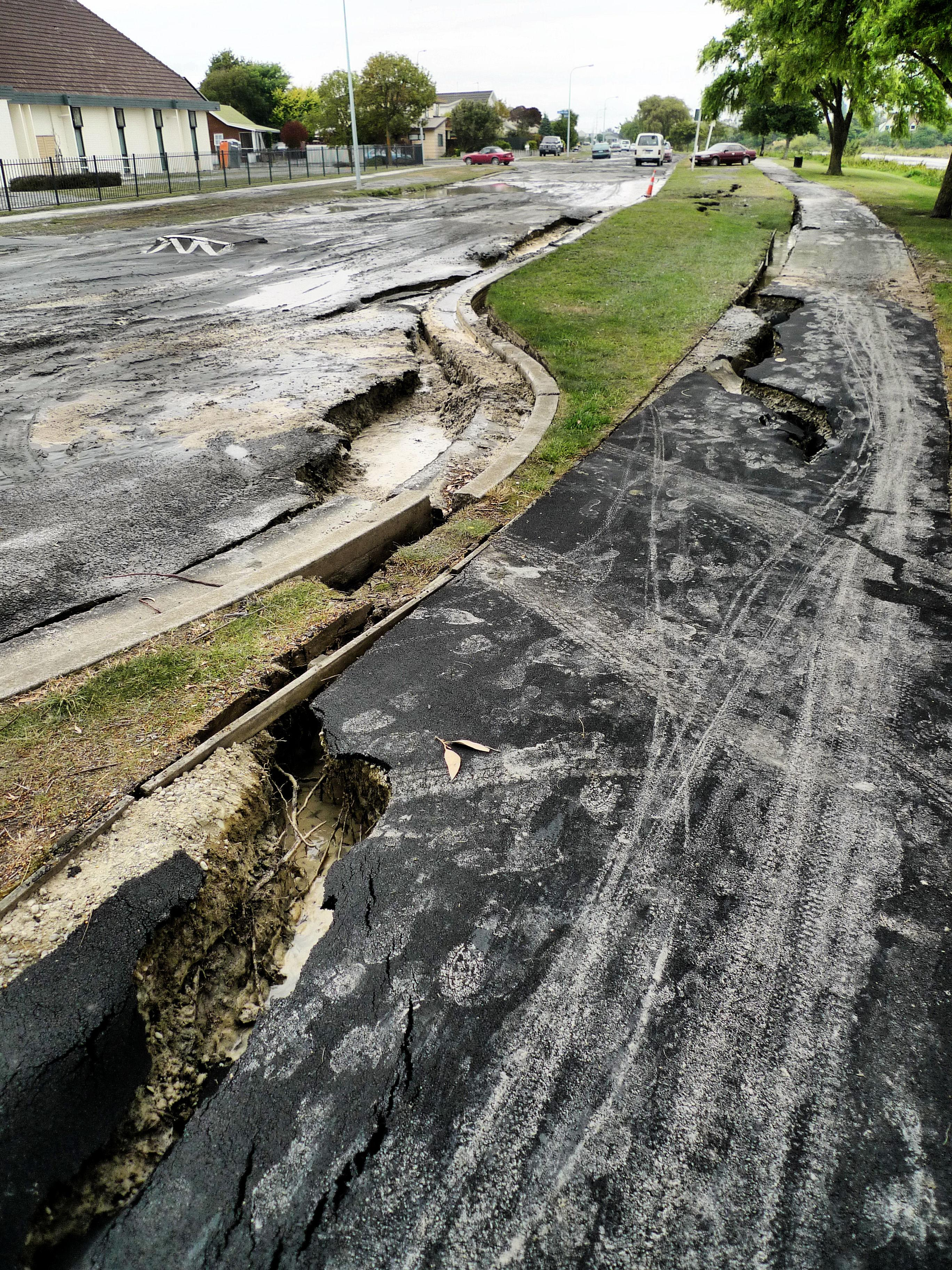
Severe land damage immediately following the February 2011 earthquake in the suburb of Avondale, part of which was later placed in the red zone (note the bump in the road where soil liquefaction pushed up an underground storm drain)

In the 2010 and 2011 earthquakes, many areas in and around Christchurch were severely affected by soil liquefaction, lateral spreading, and/or rockslides. Many flatland areas were flooded and covered in silt as a result of liquefaction, and houses and utilities were damaged. Such areas were rendered effectively uninhabitable by the quakes.

== Decision not to rebuild ==
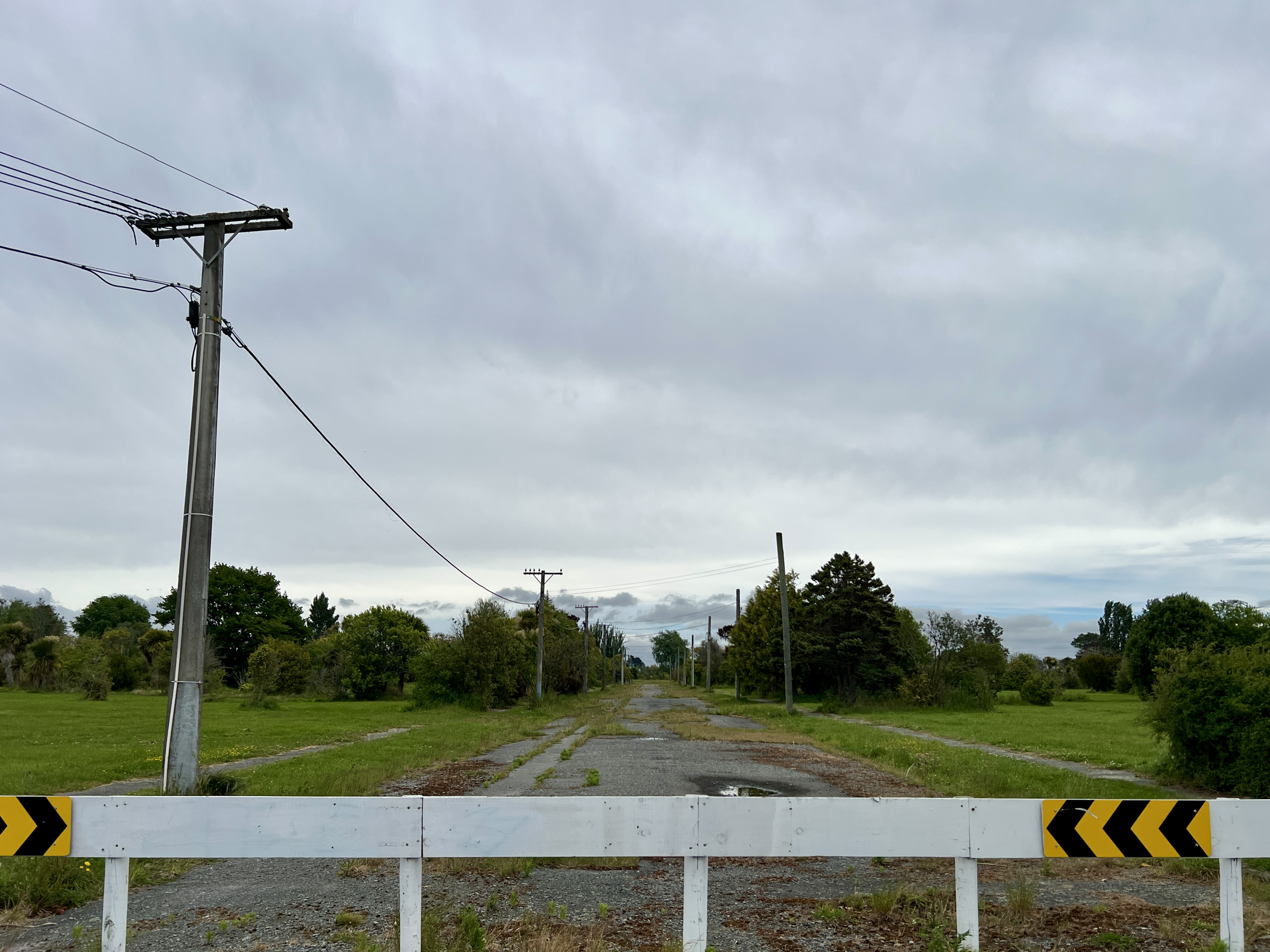
Avondale red zone in 2024

Some land in and around Christchurch was so damaged that the government determined that making the land safe for rebuilding would take years and require the demolition of most, if not all, buildings, and the eviction of their tenants. Canterbury Earthquake Recovery Authority head Gerry Brownlee said "Full land repair in these areas may mean that every house would need to be removed…. Giving people the ability to relocate on land where they can rebuild immediately is the best option we have." The government decided to pursue a simple process in order to provide clarity and support for landowners, residents, and businesses. Hence a "red zone" was established for areas in and around Christchurch where rebuilding would not be allowed, as contrasted with the "green zone" where all repairs and rebuilds were allowed.

The initial announcement of residential red zones was made on 23 June 2011, about 4 months after the February 2011 earthquake and only 11 days after the latest series of aftershocks. (Gerry Brownlee noted that each successive aftershock made CERA's job all the more complex – the February 2011 quake, the most damaging of all, had itself been an aftershock of the September 2010 quake – so the zone announcements were postponed for months.) By 24 June, not all properties had been assessed as red or green by that point, but the government determined that zoning most properties immediately, thus giving their owners certainty, was preferable to postponing the announcement until all decisions were complete. Several areas were temporarily zoned as "orange zones", indicating areas that still needed an engineering assessment, or "white zones", indicating properties in the Port Hills whose rockfall risk had not yet been assessed. By October 2012, all zones had been assessed as either red or green, so the orange and white zones were eliminated.

== Affected areas ==
The suburbs that were lost contained a relatively high proportion of more affordable housing, including social housing and rentals. Many urban Māori people lived in the red zone. Most of the displaced people moved to less-damaged outer suburbs, as well as the neighbouring Selwyn and Waimakariri Districts, and new subdivisions were constructed to meet the demand. As such, whereas quake-damaged eastern Christchurch is experiencing a cooling of economic activity, the western suburbs are experiencing more growth.

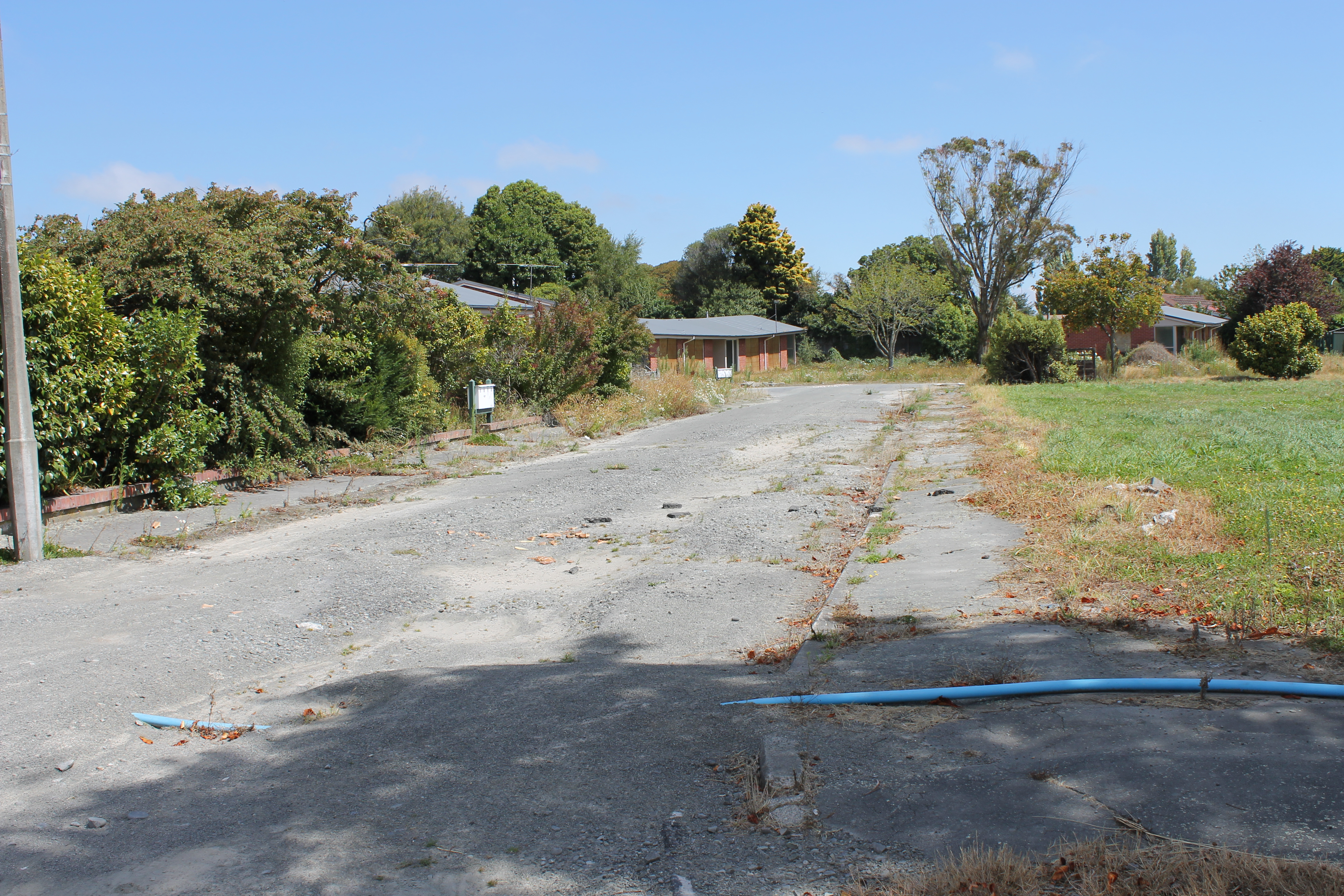
Abandoned Christchurch City Council social housing units in Avonside prior to demolition in February 2014

=== Flatland ===
In the 2010–2011 Christchurch earthquakes, many areas of the city built on alluvial soils experienced severe soil liquefaction which damaged roads, utilities, and buildings. About 7,400 homes were zoned red in the flatlands. The majority of red-zoned areas were in the eastern suburbs along the Avon River / Ōtākaro, downstream of Christchurch Central City. Affected areas included Avonside, Wainoni, Dallington, Avondale, Burwood, New Brighton, and Bexley. Some of the condemned subdivisions had been constructed less than 10 years prior to the earthquakes.

Several areas along the mouth of the Waimakariri River were placed in the red zone. Nearly all of Christchurch's northernmost suburb, Brooklands, was redzoned, virtually erasing it. Large sections of the town of Kaiapoi, as well as the seaside communities of The Pines Beach and Kairaki, were also affected. An area of Southshore abutting the Avon-Heathcote Estuary was also red-zoned.

==== Demographics ====
The statistical area of Ōtākaro-Avon River Corridor includes a large part of the eastern Christchurch red zone. It covers 6.14 km^{2} (2.37 sq mi). It had an estimated population of 70 as of June 2025, with a population density of 11.4 people per km^{2}.

Historical population
Year	Pop.	±% p.a.
2006	10,386	—
2013	1,263	−25.99%
2018	99	−39.90%
2023	81	−3.93%

Ōtakaro-Avon River Corridor had a population of 81 in the 2023 New Zealand census, a decrease of 18 people (−18.2%) since the 2018 census, and a decrease of 1,182 people (−93.6%) since the 2013 census. There were 39 males and 42 females in 33 dwellings. 3.7% of people identified as LGBTIQ+. The median age was 35.1 years (compared with 38.1 years nationally). There were 18 people (22.2%) aged under 15 years, 12 (14.8%) aged 15 to 29, 39 (48.1%) aged 30 to 64, and 12 (14.8%) aged 65 or older.

People could identify as more than one ethnicity. The results were 85.2% European (Pākehā), 22.2% Māori, 11.1% Pasifika, and 7.4% Asian. English was spoken by 100.0%, Samoan by 3.7%, and other languages by 3.7%. The percentage of people born overseas was 18.5, compared with 28.8% nationally.

Religious affiliations were 33.3% Christian, 3.7% Hindu, 3.7% Islam, and 3.7% New Age. People who answered that they had no religion were 51.9%, and 3.7% of people did not answer the census question.

Of those at least 15 years old, 9 (14.3%) people had a bachelor's or higher degree, 33 (52.4%) had a post-high school certificate or diploma, and 12 (19.0%) people exclusively held high school qualifications. The median income was $38,300, compared with $41,500 nationally. 3 people (4.8%) earned over $100,000 compared to 12.1% nationally. The employment status of those at least 15 was 30 (47.6%) full-time and 6 (9.5%) part-time.

=== Port Hills ===
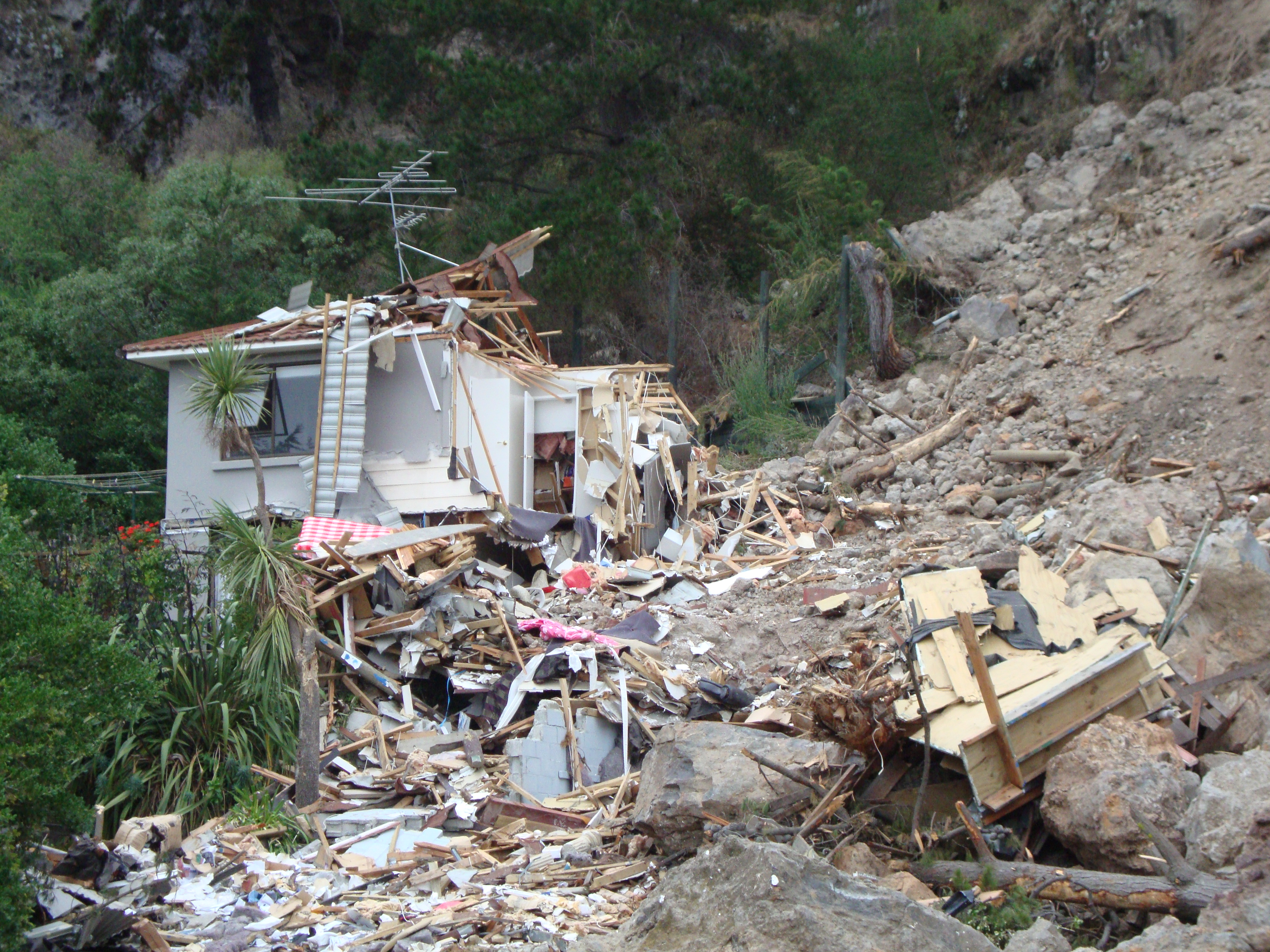
54 Raekura Place in Redcliffs was destroyed by rockfall in the February 2011 quake; this property was red-zoned and was not rebuilt on.

Several properties in the Port Hills experienced rockslides, especially in the aftershock of 13 June, which had its epicentre in the hills. About 700 homes were zoned red in the hills. Affected areas included hillside properties in the suburbs of Sumner, Redcliffs, and Ferrymead. Since many of the rockslides often occurred later than the main February 2011 quake (especially in the June 2011 earthquake), these properties were usually red-zoned later than the flatland properties, sometimes as late as November 2013, over two years afterwards.

== Buyouts ==
The Crown made two offers for insured homeowners in the red zone:

1. The government would buy the entire property, land and structures, including assuming any forthcoming insurance payments.
2. The government would buy only the land, and homeowners would deal with insurance for the structures on their own. Possession of the whole property would pass to The Crown upon settlement of insurance claims.

All buyout prices would be based on 2007 valuation of the properties, the most recent data available before the 2010 earthquake.

The initial announcement of red zones occurred on 24 June 2011, and residents were given 9 months to consider their offers. Other areas, which had initially been zoned either orange or white, were not zoned until later: the suburb of Brooklands, for example, was not conclusively zoned red until November 2011, eight months after the February 2011 quake. The government reviewed its offers one year later in June 2012.

The Crown did not buy the land through compulsory purchase, as the offers were voluntary. However, the government emphasised the lack of infrastructure and services in the abandoned areas. They noted that for homeowners who chose not to accept the offers, the Christchurch City Council could "reach the view that it is no longer feasible or practical to continue to maintain services to the remaining properties," and home insurance companies might refuse to provide or renew coverage. Indeed, city buses have been rerouted out of the red zone, and mail deliveries were cancelled in 2014, so that any remaining residents are living in areas with minimal government services.

=== Stayers ===
98% of homeowners within the red zones accepted the Crown's offer to purchase their properties. Around 125 households opted to stay in their homes instead. Many of those who remained, known colloquially as "stayers", were uninsured and, in the absence of a government buyout (which was only offered to homeowners with home insurance), could not afford to leave their homes. Many were also older, as those without mortgage payments could afford to remain. Stayers in the red zone contend with tyre punctures from unrepaired, earthquake-damaged roads, and the risk of crime in the little-serviced area.

=== Demolitions ===
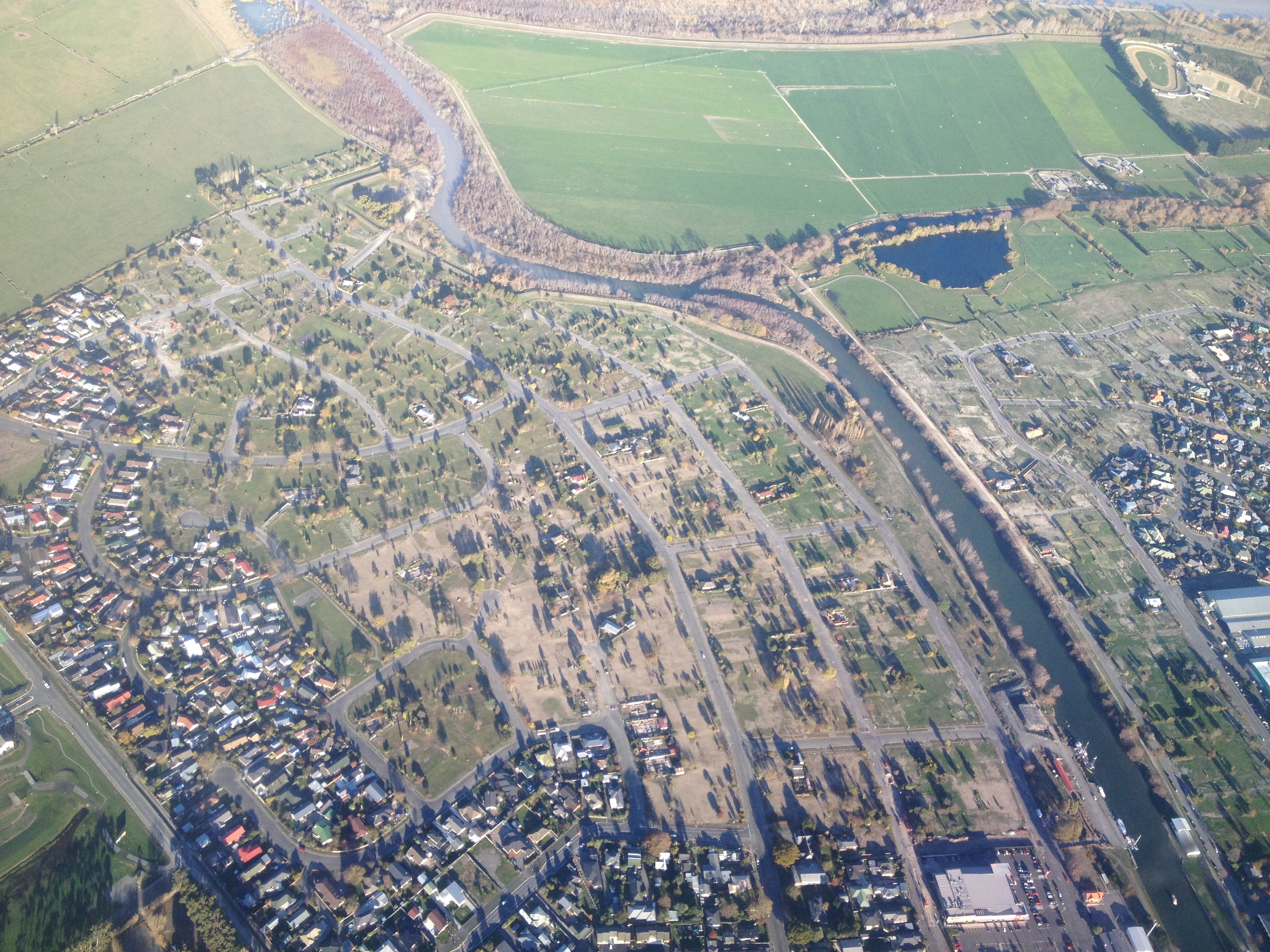
The red zone in Kaiapoi, north of Christchurch, in 2015 after most demolitions were completed

Once the Crown bought the land, tenants vacated the property, and insurance settlements were finalised, private contractors were hired to demolish the houses. Some houses, rather than being demolished, were moved to other areas. It took several years until all demolitions and removals were completed, in which time the red zone contained many abandoned buildings that attracted squatters and crime.

After removing the structures, the Crown then assumed responsibility for upkeep of the land. The land was treated by levelling it and planting it with grass. However, indigenous plants, as well as trees and shrubs over a certain height (4 metres or 6 metres depending on context) were retained. Depending on the natural environment of the property, one of six different treatment types was applied: grassland, riparian buffer area, dune, estuarine edge, wet areas, and no clearance treatment (for areas with existing non-intensive land use such as grazing). Owing to the policy of leaving most vegetation in place, many trees and shrubs that once marked lot boundaries still remain in their rectangular alignments around the houses that have been demolished.

The last demolition was completed in October 2021.

== Controversy ==
The government only offered buyouts to homeowners with home insurance, which is compulsory for home owners who hold a home loan (mortgage) in New Zealand. Brownlee argued that to buy properties from homeowners who failed to purchase insurance would create a moral hazard by setting a precedent that homeowners without insurance would receive a bailout from the government, despite not insuring their properties against damage. However, uninsured homeowners (many of whom were uninsured by mistake, due to lapses in coverage) countered that insurance status ought not be a factor in what was, effectively, the condemnation of their homes: they argued that since it would be infeasible to live in a red zone after the rest of the area was demolished and services terminated, the government was effectively taking their homes via compulsory purchase, and ought to pay them compensation. A group called Quake Outcasts sued the government, alleging that they suffered unlawful discrimination on a basis that was not warranted by the Canterbury Earthquake Response and Recovery Act 2010. The Quake Outcasts also included owners of vacant land who were unable to insure their properties because they had not yet built structures on them, and were therefore denied compensation based on lack of insurance. In 2019, the government opted to settle with the Quake Outcasts, paying them out rather than prolonging the legal battle. Member of Parliament Megan Woods stated that the settlement would allow people to move on with their lives.

Another source of controversy was that insurance companies paid out less than the full value of some houses if the companies found that, based on the structural characteristics of the house, it was repairable, even though the red zone legally prohibited such repairs.

== Current land use ==
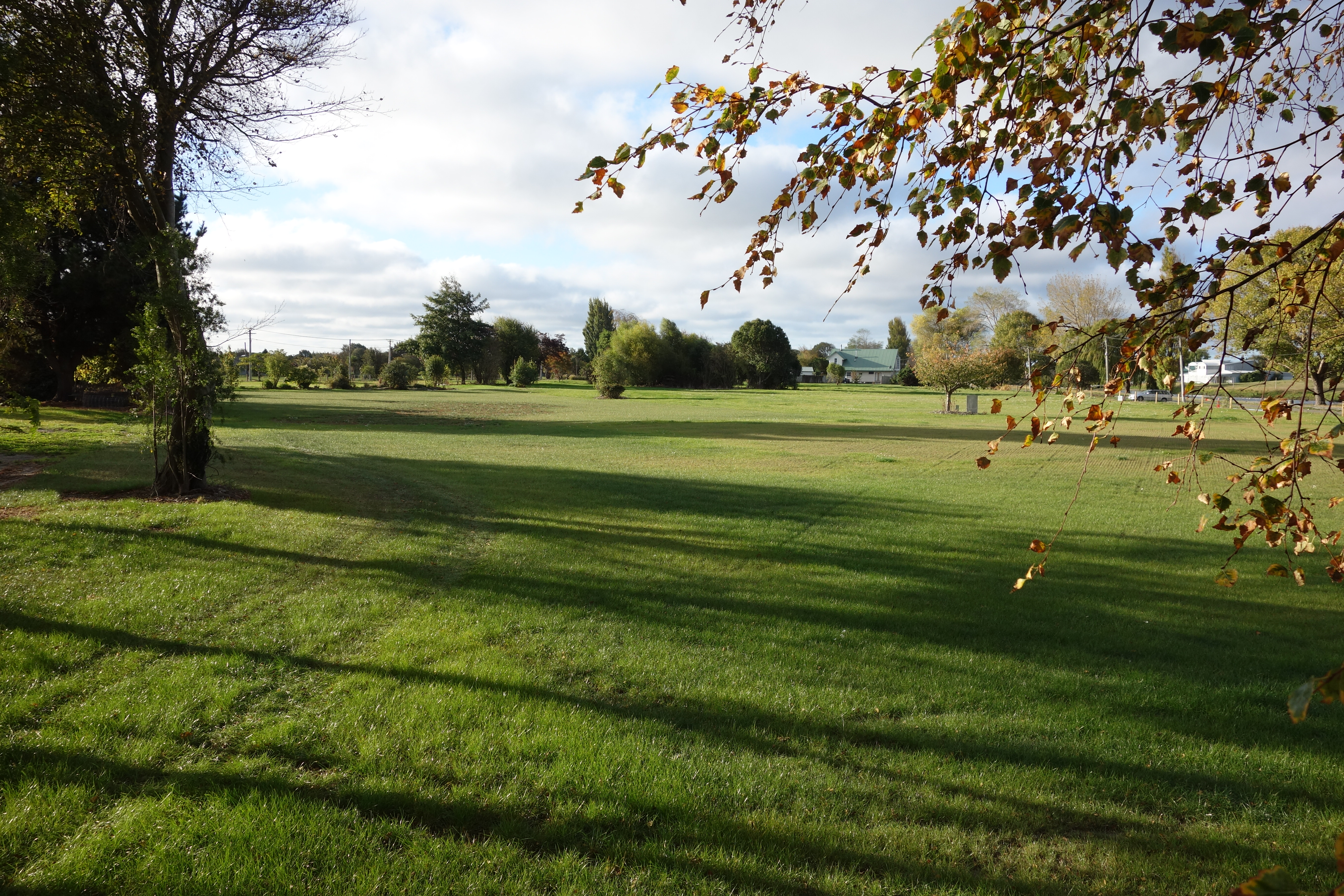
An area of red zone in 2016 after all houses were cleared

Since the disestablishment of CERA in 2016, Land Information New Zealand (LINZ) manages the land within Christchurch, taking responsibility for managing vegetation, cleaning rubbish, and providing security. Pending a permanent land use, LINZ allows the vacant red zone to be used for activities such as community gardening, mountain biking, and beekeeping on a temporary basis (up to 5 years in length). The land is sometimes used for festivals as well. The vacant, albeit damaged, roads are used for a driving school and as a testing ground for autonomous or radio-controlled vehicles. Before the demolitions were complete, some of the vacant houses were also used by the New Zealand Army for training exercises. Land within the Waimakariri District is owned and managed by the Waimakariri District Council.

=== Future plans ===
Ex-residents of the demolished neighbourhoods along the Avon River / Ōtākaro are broadly in favour of turning their old homes into a park, with organisations such as the Avon-Ōtākaro Network lobbying to "[change] Christchurch's Avon River red zone from a place of trauma and heartache to a land of fun and natural beauty." The government's long-term earthquake recovery organisation, Regenerate Christchurch, developed the Ōtākaro/Avon River Corridor Regeneration Plan to make the Avon River red zone into a large park stretching from downtown Christchurch to the Avon Heathcote Estuary by the ocean. Such a park, at 602 hectares (6.02 km^{2}), will be nearly four times the size of Christchurch's Hagley Park, and Regenerate Christchurch considers this vast new urban open space a unique opportunity to improve the city's parkland and natural environment. Researchers at Lincoln University estimate "the total annual value of benefits to Christchurch residents, savings in public health costs deriving from a recreational reserve and the value of ecosystem services in the ARRRZ [Avon River Residential Red Zone] to be approximately $94.1 million/year." The plan is intended to adapt to rising sea levels which are expected to flood part of the Ōtākaro/Avon River Corridor. The plans also acknowledge the existing Māori heritage in the area of Horseshoe Lake, an old oxbow lake of the Avon River / Ōtākaro, where there was once a Ngāi Tahu settlement. The plan calls for educational institutions that preserve and spread Māori culture. The plan was approved on 23 August 2019.

The East Lake development, which would create an open water course along the Avon River / Ōtākaro suitable for international rowing regattas, remains under consideration as a long-term land use for the red zone. However, Regenerate Christchurch is doubtful of the plan for environmental reasons.

The Waimakariri Residential Red Zone Recovery Plan seeks to rehabilitate the condemned land around the mouth of the Waimakariri River in Waimakariri District, especially in Kaiapoi. Proposed land uses "include new parks and reserves, walking and cycling links, a BMX track, a dog park, mixed use business areas, provision for heritage and mahinga kai activities, roads and infrastructure sites and rural activities." Seeking to rebrand the devastated red zone, the plan renames the condemned areas as "regeneration areas".

In February 2026 the Christchurch City Council revealed their plans for the redevelopment of the red zone between Fitzgerald Avenue and Stanmore Drive, north of the Avon River / Ōtākaro. The plans included "advanced nature play, walking tracks, a viewing platform, educational spaces, and ecological restoration". The city council expects to spend $2.5 million on the project. Community consultations will begin in March.

== See also ==
- Central City Red Zone
