= Avon River / Ōtākaro =

River in Christchurch, New Zealand

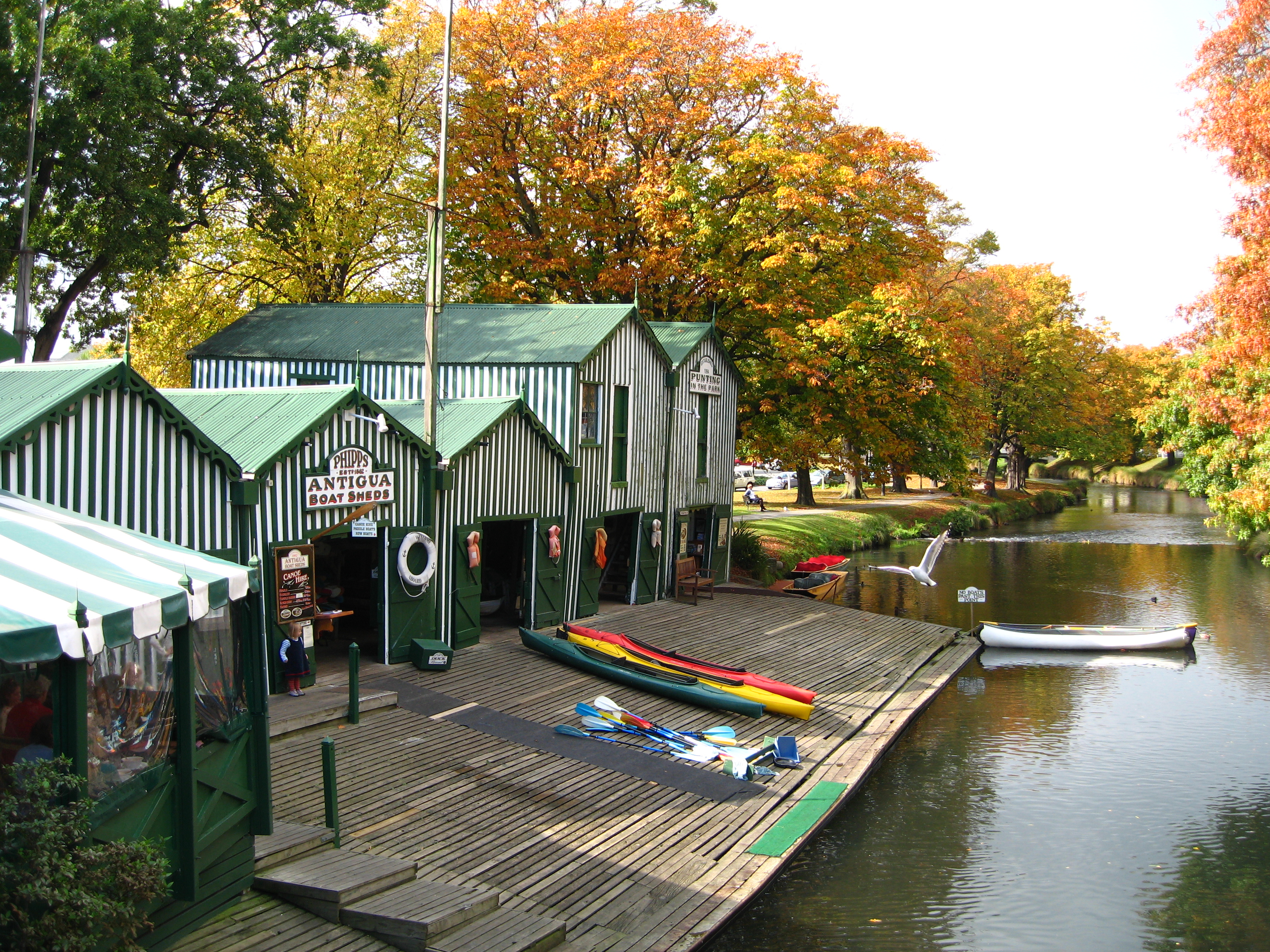
- Antigua boat sheds on the Avon, Christchurch
- Course of the Avon River / Ōtākaro

Location
- Country: New Zealand

Physical characteristics
- Source
  - location: Avonhead
- Mouth
  - location: Pegasus Bay via the Avon Heathcote Estuary / Ihutai
  - coordinates: 43.528°S 172.726°E
  - elevation: 0 m (0 ft)
- Length: 14 km (8.7 mi)

The Avon River / Ōtākaro (/ˈeɪvən/ AY-vən; Māori: [ˈɔːtaːkaɾɔ]), sometimes rendered as the River Avon, flows through the centre of the city of Christchurch, New Zealand, and into the Pacific Ocean via the Avon Heathcote Estuary / Ihutai, which it shares with the Ōpāwaho / Heathcote River.

== Course ==
The Avon follows a meandering course through Christchurch from its source in the outer western suburb of Avonhead through Ilam, Riccarton and Fendalton, then through Hagley Park and the Central Business District (CBD). East of the CBD, it passes through Avonside, Dallington, Avondale and Aranui, finally flowing into the Pacific Ocean via the Avon Heathcote Estuary near Sumner.

== Naming ==
The first name given to the river is the Māori Ōtākaro, meaning 'place to play' after children who would play on the river bank while food was being gathered. Some sources from the early days of European settlement also give the Māori name as Putare Kamutu. The Canterbury Association had planned to call it the Shakespere [sic]. The river was renamed as the Avon by John Deans in 1848 to commemorate the Scottish Avon, which rises in the Ayrshire hills near what was his grandfathers' farm, Over Auchentiber. The Deans built their homestead adjacent to the Avon River where the suburb of Riccarton now lies. The river's name and that of the river which runs through Shakespeare's birthplace of Stratford-on-Avon is thus only coincidental, contrary to popular local belief.

The name was officially altered to Avon River / Ōtākaro by the Ngāi Tahu Claims Settlement Act 1998, one of many such changes under the Ngāi Tahu treaty settlement.

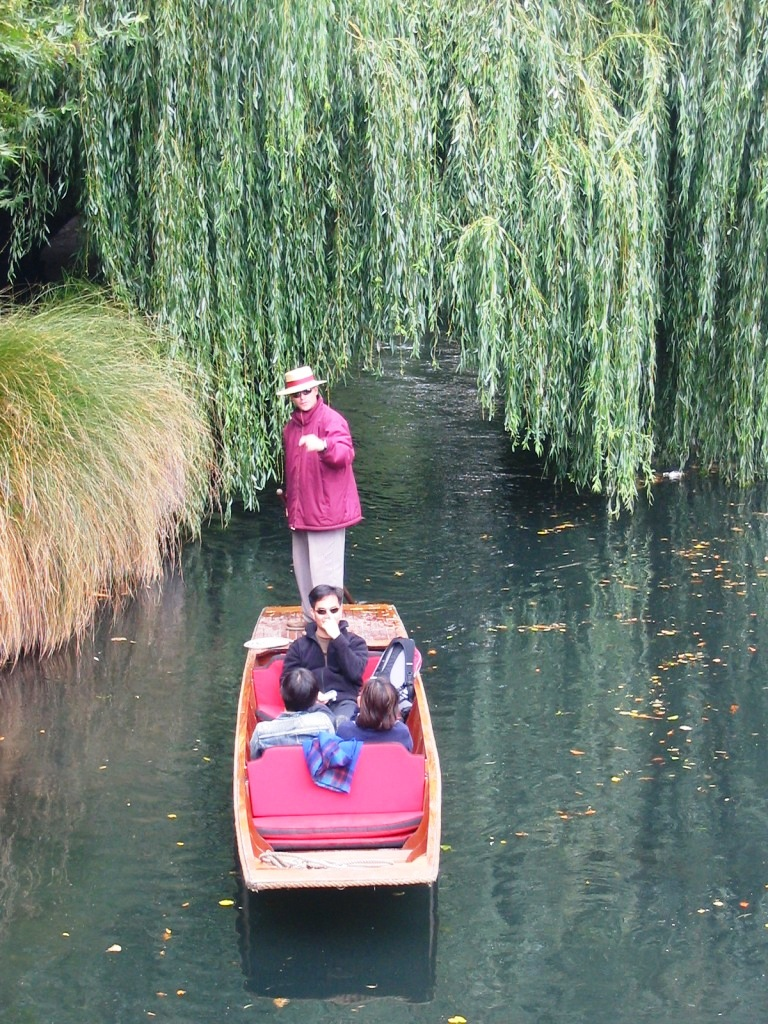
Punting on the Avon River / Ōtākaro

== Punting ==
Commercial punting as a tourist attraction is available in the central city, Hagley Park and Mona Vale, a park in Fendalton.

== Fishing ==
The Avon River, flowing through the centre of the South Island's most populous urban area, is popular with local anglers as it contains large numbers of introduced brown trout. In the lower reaches below the Central Business District it is not uncommon for trout over 10 lbs (4 kg) to be caught, after the fish have consumed large quantities of a native Galaxiidae and whitebait. Above the CBD the fish are smaller and more numerous, and fly fishing is the most common fishing method there, as the trout are somewhat wary of anglers. Angling is not permitted between the Armagh Street bridge at Hagley Park and the Barbadoes Street bridge downstream from the city centre.

== Earthquakes ==
Much of the land along the Avon River / Ōtākaro downstream from the central city was damaged in the 2010 Canterbury earthquake, the February 2011 Christchurch earthquake and the June 2011 Christchurch earthquake and has been zoned red by the Canterbury Earthquake Recovery Authority. Community interests are lobbying for the red zoned land to be turned into a park that links the central city with the estuary. The campaign is headed by a group called Avon-Ōtākaro Network (AvON) and has received the backing of the mayor.

In January 2013 health officials warned against swimming in the river due to contamination, linked to damage caused in the earthquakes.

In September 2015, it was revealed that Christchurch City Council (CCC) and the Canterbury Earthquake Recovery Authority (CERA) had bought two sculptures named Stay from English sculptor Antony Gormley, with one of them to be placed in the Avon River. Gormley, who had visited Christchurch in 2007 and significantly discounted his works for the city, stated that he wanted his sculptures to help the city's healing process from the earthquakes. CCC's contribution towards the project was NZ$502,500, while CERA refused to say how much it spent. The second sculpture will be placed at the Arts Centre. The two sculpture are Gormley's first works in New Zealand.

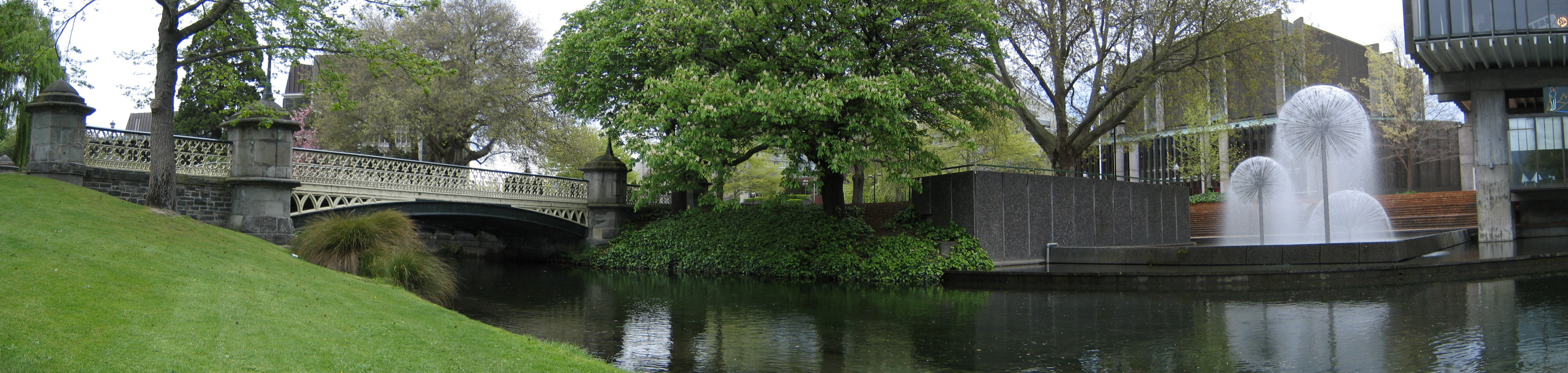
Avon River / Ōtākaro in Victoria Square, Christchurch in 2004 before the earthquakes severely damaged the area

== See also ==
- Avon River (Marlborough)
