= List of shipwrecks in July 1851 =

The list of shipwrecks in July 1851 includes ships sunk, foundered, wrecked, grounded, or otherwise lost during July 1851.

== 1 July ==
List of shipwrecks: 1 July 1851
Ship	State	Description
John Peel	United Kingdom	The ship was wrecked on the English Bank, in the River Plate. She was on a voyage from Liverpool, Lancashire to California, United States.
Mary Mitchell	United States	The 354-ton whaling ship was stove in by ice and lost in the Bering Sea 30 nautical miles (56 km; 35 mi) northwest of King Island.

== 2 July ==
List of shipwrecks: 2 July 1851
Ship	State	Description
Hirondelle	France	The ship was in collision with another vessel and sank in the River Thames. She was on a voyage from Riga, Russia to London, United Kingdom. She was refloated and completed her journey.
Maria	United Kingdom	The barque was wrecked at Cape Terawhiti, New Zealand with the loss of 29 of the 31 people on board. She was on a voyage from Port Victoria to Wellington.
Phenomene	Belgium	The ship was wrecked in the Hooghly River. She was on a voyage from Akyab, Burma to Calcutta, India.
Rhine	United Kingdom	The ship sprang a leak and was beached at Hornsea, Yorkshire, where she subsequently became a wreck. Her crew survived. She was on a voyage from King's Lynn, Norfolk to Bordeaux, Gironde, France.
St. Helen	United Kingdom	The ship ran aground on a reef and was damaged. She was on a voyage from Gonaïves, Haiti to Saint Domingo and Queenstown, County Cork. She was refloated and taken in to Nassau, Bahamas in a leaky condition.

== 3 July ==
List of shipwrecks: July 1851
Ship	State	Description
Defiance	United Kingdom	The ship foundered in the Irish Sea off South Stack, Anglesey with the loss of all hands. She was on a voyage from Caernarfon to Holyhead, Anglesey.

== 4 July ==
List of shipwrecks: 4 July 1851
Ship	State	Description
Novelty	United Kingdom	The barque was wrecked on Duke of Clarence Island with the loss of a crew member. She was on a voyage from Sydney, New South Wales to San Francisco, California, United States.
Peruvian	United Kingdom	The ship was wrecked on the San Jose Rocks, off Montevideo, Uruguay. She was on a voyage from the Clyde to Lima, Peru.

== 5 July ==
List of shipwrecks: 5 July 1851
Ship	State	Description
Auguste	(flag) France	The ship capsized at the mouth of the Gironde. Her crew were rescued. She was on a voyage from an English port to Bordeaux, Gironde.
Olivier von Noord	Flag unknown	The ship ran aground at the mouth of the Yangtze. She was on a voyage from Liverpool, Lancashire to Shanghai, China.
Union	United States	The steamship was wrecked at on St. Quinlan's Reef, in the Pacific Ocean. All on board were rescued by the steamship Northerner (United States). Union was on a voyage from San Francisco to Panama.

== 6 July ==
List of shipwrecks: 6 July 1851
Ship	State	Description
Hudson	United States	The ship ran aground on a reef off Gorgona, Grand Duchy of Tuscany. She was on a voyage from Panama City, Republic of Colombia to Gorgona.

== 7 July ==
List of shipwrecks: 7 July 1851
Ship	State	Description
Gallinipper	United States	Sonar image of the wreck of Gallinipper, 12 June 2022. During a voyage from Milwaukee, Wisconsin, to Bay de Noque, Michigan, to pick up a cargo of lumber and carrying a crew of seven and two passengers, the 95-foot (29 m) two-masted schooner capsized in Lake Michigan 8 to 10 nautical miles (15 to 19 km; 9.2 to 11.5 mi) off the coast of Wisconsin between Manitowoc and Sheboygan during a rain squall. She righted herself, but then capsized again, and her crew and passengers abandoned ship and were rescued by the schooner Cleopatra (United States). Waterlogged, she became mostly submerged, but did not sink. The schooner Crook (United States) sighted her on 9 July and reported her to be nearly underwater, and the schooner Convoy (United States) later made an unsuccessful attempt to take her under tow 10 nautical miles (19 km; 12 mi) from Manitowoc, but gave up and abandoned her 10 nautical miles (19 km; 12 mi) southeast by east of Manitowoc. Her wreck was discovered in 1994 in 210 feet (64 m) of water.
Peru	United Kingdom	The steamship was driven ashore and caught fire at Valparaíso, Chile.

== 8 July ==
List of shipwrecks: 8 July 1851
Ship	State	Description
Æneas	United Kingdom	The ship ran aground in the Hooghly River. She was on a voyage from Mauritius to Calcutta, India.
Arab	United Kingdom	The ship was damaged in a gale at Valparaíso, Chile.
Caspar	United Kingdom	The ship was damaged in a gale at Valparaíso.
Donna Carmelita	United Kingdom	The ship was driven ashore and severely damaged at Valparaíso.
Dove	United Kingdom	The ship ran aground off Inch, Slate Islands. She was on a voyage from Newcastle upon Tyne, Northumberland to Dundalk, County Louth. She was refloated and taken in to Oban, Argyllshire for repairs.
England	United Kingdom	The ship was severely damaged in a gale at Valparaíso.
Katharine Shearer	United Kingdom	The ship was damaged in a gale at Valparaíso.
Larch	United Kingdom	The barque was driven ashore in a gale at Valparaíso.
Lively	United Kingdom	The ship was wrecked on the south coast of Saint Croix, Virgin Islands. She was on a voyage from Newport, Monmouthshire to Havana, Cuba.
Novion	Chile	The brig was driven ashore and severely damaged at Valparaíso.
Prospece	United Kingdom	The ship was damaged in a gale at Valparaíso.{
Rival	(United Kingdom of Great Britain and Ireland) Jersey	The ship struck the Tartarnga Rock and was consequently beached at Pernambuco, Brazil, where she was wrecked. She was on a voyage from Ascension Island to Pernambuco.

== 9 July ==
List of shipwrecks: 9 July 1851
Ship	State	Description
Caroline Dodd	United Kingdom	The ship ran aground whilst on a voyage from Totnes to Dartmouth, Devon. She was refloated.

== 10 July ==
List of shipwrecks: 10 July 1851
Ship	State	Description
Aramata	United States	The New London ship was lost on Brooke Bank near Big Diomede in the Bering Strait. Her crew survived.
Astolf	Sweden	The ship was driven ashore and wrecked at Thyborøn, Denmark with the loss of a crew member. Survivors were rescued by Carte's rocket apparatus. She was on a voyage from Hartlepool, County Durham, United Kingdom to Gothenburg.
Brilliante	Spain	The brig departed from Hong Kong for Canton, China. Subsequently captured by Mandarin pirates and sunk off "Linting". Her crew were murdered.

== 11 July ==
List of shipwrecks: 11 July 1851
Ship	State	Description
Edward	United Kingdom	The steamship was driven ashore at Barmouth, Merionethshire. Her crew were rescued.
Isabella Dick	United Kingdom	The ship foundered in the Mediterranean Sea 30 nautical miles (56 km) off Agrigento, Sicily. Her crew were rescued. She was on a voyage from Licata, Sicily to Liverpool, Lancashire.
Margaretha	Danzig	The ship was driven ashore and wrecked near "Wangsaa", Denmark. Her crew were rescued. She was on a voyage from Danzig to London, United Kingdom. She had become a wreck by 18 July.
Marthiena Oswey	(United Kingdom of Great Britain and Ireland) British North America	The ship ran aground in the Magdalen Islands, Nova Scotia She was refloated.
Science	United Kingdom	The brig was wrecked on Castle Island, Bermuda. Her crew were rescued. She was on a voyage from the Rio Hacha to Hamburg.
Zenobia	United Kingdom	The ship was driven ashore on Seal Island, Nova Scotia, British North America. She was on a voyage from Saint John, New Brunswick, British North America to Cork. She was consequently condemned.

== 12 July ==
List of shipwrecks: 12 July 1851
Ship	State	Description
Alert	United Kingdom	The schooner departed from Amlwch, Anglesey for the River Tyne. No further trace, presumed foundered with the loss of all hands.
Houqua	United States	The ship was wrecked about two miles east of Cape Alevina in the northern Sea of Okhotsk during a fog. The entire crew and some of the cargo were saved by the ship Canton (United States) a few weeks later.
Irt	United Kingdom	The ship struck the quayside and was beached at Whitehaven, Cumberland. She was on a voyage from Antigua to Whitehaven.
Isabella	United Kingdom	The ship foundered in the Mediterranean Sea 50 nautical miles (93 km) off Agrigento, Sicily. Her crew were rescued by Francis Yates (United Kingdom.
London Packet	Bremen	The ship ran aground in the Gambia River at Cacheo, Gambia Colony and Protectorate. Her crew were rescued She was plundered and wrecked by the local inhabitants.

== 13 July ==
List of shipwrecks: 13 July 1851
Ship	State	Description
Joseph Anderson	United Kingdom	The brigantine struck the Culver Sands and foundered in the Bristol Channel off Steep Holm with the loss of five of her seven crew. She was on a voyage from Newport, Monmouthshire to Plymouth, Devon.
Lord Nelson	United Kingdom	The sloop struck the pier and sank at Whitehaven, Cumberland. She was on a voyage from Liverpool, Lancashire to Harrington, Cumberland.
Prosperous	United Kingdom	The ship sprang a leak and was abandoned in the North Sea off Cromer, Norfolk. Her crew were rescued by Matthew (United Kingdom). Prosperous was on a voyage from South Shields, County Durham to Great Yarmouth, Norfolk.
Sarine	Russia	The barque ran aground on the Haisborough Sands, in the North Sea off the coast of Norfolk. She was on a voyage from London to Hartlepool, County Durhm and the Baltic. She was refloated and taken in to Great Yarmouth, Norfolk in a leaky condition.
Witch	United Kingdom	The steamship was wrecked on the Tuskar Rock. Her crew were rescued. She was on a voyage from Bristol, Gloucestershire to Cork.

== 14 July ==
List of shipwrecks: 14 July 1851
Ship	State	Description
Arabella	United States	The New Bedford ship struck ice during a thick fog and sank in the Bering Strait. Her crew were rescued by the ship Washington (United States).
Fame	United Kingdom	The ship was driven ashore at Gibraltar Point, Lincolnshire. She was on a voyage from Poole, Dorset to King's Lynn, Norfolk. She was refloated on 16 July and taken in to King's Lynn.
Geertruida Lammegiena	Hamburg	The ship foundered in the North Sea. Her crew were rescued. She was on a voyage from Harwich, Essex, United Kingdom to Hamburg.
Industry	United Kingdom	The ship was driven ashore on Walney Island, Lancashire.
Lady Mary Ann	United Kingdom	The sloop sprang a leak and foundered in the North Sea off Cromer, Norfolk. Her crew were rescued by Grasshopper (United Kingdom). Lady Mary Ann was on a voyage from Newcastle upon Tyne, Northumberland to Lowestoft, Suffolk.

== 15 July ==
List of shipwrecks: 15 July 1851
Ship	State	Description
America 2nd	United States	This New Bedford whaler, under Captain Seabury, started making water after striking a small cake of ice and sunk in the Anadir Sea (North Bering Sea). The captain and crew took to the boats and were picked up by the whaler Minerva Smyth and the barque Harvest (both United States). The wreck was sold at auction to Captain Childs of Minerva Smyth for $50.
Esther Ann	United Kingdom	The ship was wrecked on the Hartwell Reef, off Boa Vista, Cape Verde Islands. All on board were rescued. She was on a voyage from Trieste to Pernambuco, Brazil.
Henry Thompson	United States	The 315-ton whaling ship was lost in ice the Bering Strait near the Diomede Islands. Her crew survived.

== 16 July ==
List of shipwrecks: 16 July 1851
Ship	State	Description
John and Mary	United Kingdom	The sloop was driven ashore on the coast of Lincolnshire. She was on a voyage from London to Sunderland, County Durham. She was refloated and taken in to Grimsby, Lincolnshire in a leaky condition.
Union	United Kingdom	The ship ran aground on the Capelle Plaat. She was on a voyage from an English port to Antwerp.

== 17 July ==
List of shipwrecks: July 1851
Ship	State	Description
Janet	United Kingdom	The brig spang a leak and sank in the North Sea off Holderness, Yorkshire. Her crew were rescued by the pilot boat № 9 (United Kingdom). Janet was on a voyage from King's Lynn, Norfolk to Seaham, County Durham.
Mary	United Kingdom	The brig struck a rock and sank off Barbados with the loss of three of her six crew. The survivors took to a boat, but two of them died on 24 July. The remaining survivor was rescued on 30 July. Mary was on a voyage from Halifax, Nova Scotia, British North America to Barbados.

== 19 July ==
List of shipwrecks: 19 July 1851
Ship	State	Description
Demetrias	Flag unknown	The ship was driven ashore at Gibraltar. She was refloated with assistance from HMS Janus (Royal Navy).
Sarah	United Kingdom	The ship struck a sunken rock in the Pentland Firth and was damaged. She was on a voyage from the Clyde to Hamburg. She put in to Berwick upon Tweed, Northumberland in a leaky condition.

== 20 July ==
List of shipwrecks: 20 July 1851
Ship	State	Description
Caroline	United Kingdom	The ship foundered off Longhope, Orkney Islands during a squall. Her crew were rescued.
Emilie	Rostock	The ship ran aground on a reef off Skagen, Denmark. She was on a voyage from Rostock to Middlesbrough, Yorkshire, United Kingdom. She was refloated and resumed her voyage.
Harriet Scott	United Kingdom	The ship was driven ashore at Appledore, Devon. She was on a voyage from Quebec City, Province of Canada, British North America to Appledore.
Otilla	United Kingdom	The ship ran aground on the Alligator Reef. She was on a voyage from New Orleans, Louisiana to Liverpool, Lancashire. She was refloated on 23 July and taken in to Key West, Florida, United States.

== 21 July ==
List of shipwrecks: 21 July 1851
Ship	State	Description
Prophete	France	The full-rigged ship was wrecked on the Cardagos Shoal. Her 27 crew were rescued on 11 September by the full-rigged ship Isabella (United Kingdom). Prophete was on a voyage from Mauritius to Ceylon.
Rachel	United Kingdom	The sloop was driven ashore and wrecked at the mouth of the River Tay. Her crew were rescued. She was on a voyage from North Sunderland, County Durham to Dundee, Forfarshire.

== 22 July ==
List of shipwrecks: 22 July 1851
Ship	State	Description
Jane	United Kingdom	The barque was destroyed by fire in the Atlantic Ocean. Her crew were rescued by Governor Briggs (United States). Jane was on a voyage from New York, United States to Glasgow, Renfrewshire.
Pacha	United Kingdom	The paddle steamer collided with Erin (United Kingdom) and sank off the Formosa Shoal in the Strait of Malacca with the loss of sixteen lives. Survivors were rescued by Erin. Pacha was on a voyage from Hong Kong to Calcutta, India. Both vessels belonged to the Peninsular & Oriental Steam Navigation Company.
Suwarrow	Stralsund	The brig was wrecked at Sulina, Ottoman Empire. Her seven crew were rescued. She was on a voyage from Aberdour, Fife, United Kingdom to Galaţi, Ottoman Empire.
Woodman	United Kingdom	The ship sprang a leak and was beached at Stornoway, Isle of Lewis, Outer Hebrides. She was on a voyage from Liverpool, Lancashire to Hammerfest, Norway.

== 23 July ==
List of shipwrecks: 23 July 1851
Ship	State	Description
Maria	(United Kingdom of Great Britain and Ireland) New Zealand	The barque was driven ashore and wrecked at Karori with the loss of 29 lives. She was on a voyage from Port Victoria to Wellington.

== 24 July ==
List of shipwrecks: 24 July 1851
Ship	State	Description
Alston	United Kingdom	The ship ran aground on the Scroby Sands, Norfolk and sank. Her crew were rescued. She was on a voyage from Sunderland, County Durham to London.
Jaeger	United Kingdom	The ship caught fire and was abandoned in the Atlantic Ocean. Her crew were rescued by Europa (Netherlands) and Pylade (Sweden). Jaeger was on a voyage from Liverpool, Lancashire to Calcutta, India.
Maria	Stettin	The ship sprang a leak and sank in the Baltic Sea off Rügenwalde, Prussia. Her crew were rescued. She was on a voyage from Stettin to Memel, Prussia.
Molly Bawn	United Kingdom	The ship was driven ashore and wrecked at Coquimbo, Chile.

== 25 July ==
List of shipwrecks: 25 July 1851
Ship	State	Description
Emanuel	Sweden	The ship ran aground at Reval, Russia. She was on a voyage from Stockholm to Reval.
Garonne	France	The paquebot was wrecked in the Strait of Magellan. Her crew were rescued. She was on a voyage from Bordeaux, Gironde to San Francisco, California, United States.
General Rivera	Chile	The brig was driven ashore at Valparaíso.
Maria	United Kingdom	The 480-ton barque was wrecked near Cape Terawhiti, New Zealand, with the loss of 29 lives (all but two of those on board). She was on a voyage from Lyttelton, New Zealand to Wellington, New Zealand.
Nimrod	United Kingdom	The ship was driven ashore in Table Bay. She was later refloated and taken in to Bombay, India.
Swift	United Kingdom	The smack ran aground in the Sound of Skye off Scalpay, Outer Hebrides. She was consequently beached at Kyleakin, where she capsized and sank. She was on a voyage from Liverpool, Lancashire to Anstruther, Fife.

== 26 July ==
List of shipwrecks: 26 July 1851
Ship	State	Description
Alliance	United Kingdom	The ship was driven ashore and damaged at Cape Romain, South Carolina, United States. She was on a voyage from Liverpool, Lancashire to Charleston, South Carolina. She was refloated on 28 July and towed in to Charleston in a leaky condition.
Randolph	United Kingdom	The East Indiaman was wrecked on a reef in the Indian Ocean with the loss of 22-32 lives. There were over 270 survivors. She was on a voyage from London to Mauritius and Calcutta, India.

== 27 July ==
List of shipwrecks: 27 July 1851
Ship	State	Description
Hoppet	United Kingdom	The ship ran aground near Portsmouth, Hampshire. She was refloated the next day.

== 28 July ==
List of shipwrecks: 28 July 1851
Ship	State	Description
Ann Grant	United Kingdom	The ship was wrecked in the Folly River, Nova Scotia, British North America.
Clandia	United Kingdom	The ship ran aground on Skagen, Denmark. She was on a voyage from Cardiff, Glamorgan to Saint Petersburg, Russia. She was refloated and resumed her voyage.
Elizabeth Brown	United Kingdom	The barque was wrecked on the Bunnes Reef, in the Torres Strait. Her crew survived.
Enterprise	(United Kingdom of Great Britain and Ireland) British North America	The ship was wrecked at Ragged Islands, Newfoundland. Her crew were rescued. She was on a voyage from Shelburne, Nova Scotia to New York, United States.
Marion	United Kingdom	The ship was wrecked on the Troubridge Shoals. All on board, more than 350 people, were rescued. She was on a voyage from London to Adelaide, South Australia.

== 29 July ==
List of shipwrecks: 29 July 1851
Ship	State	Description
Choice	United Kingdom	The ship sprang a leak in the Atlantic Ocean. She was abandoned on 5 August. Four of her thirteen crew reached Cayenne, French Guiana in the jollyboat. The other nine crew took to the longboat. They were rescued on 17 August by Tartare (French Navy).
London	United Kingdom	The ship was run into and sank in Robin Hoods Bay by Midas (United Kingdom). Her crew survived.
Marion	United Kingdom	The ship was wrecked on the Troubridge Shoals. She was on a voyage from London to Adelaide, South Australia.

== 30 July ==
List of shipwrecks: 30 July 1851
Ship	State	Description
Fanny	United Kingdom	The ship was driven ashore and wrecked in Table Bay.
Gottland	Sweden	The steamship caught fire at Kalmar and was scuttled.. All on board were rescued. She was on a voyage from Stockholm to Ystad. Gottland was later refloated and taken in to Stockholm for repairs.
Michael	Kingdom of Hanover	The brig ran aground on the English Bank, in the River Plate. She was on a voyage from Buenos Aires, Argentina to Montevideo, Uruguay. She was refloated.
Washington	United States	The steamship was driven ashore at Sandy Point, Maine. She was on a voyage from Bremen to New York. She was refloated the next day and taken in to New York.

== 31 July ==
List of shipwrecks: 31 July 1851
Ship	State	Description
Arthur	France	The ship ran agronnd on the Bec d'Ambés, Gironde and was wrecked. She was on a voyage from Guadeloupe to Bordeaux, Gironde.
Jane	United Kingdom	The ship struck the Platters, off the coast of Anglesey and was abandoned. Her crew were rescued.
John Hawkes	United Kingdom	The ship was abandoned in the Atlantic Ocean. She was discovered the next day by British Empire. Temporary repairs were made and five crew were put aboard with the intention of taking her to an English port. She arrived at Liverpool, Lancashire on 20 August.

== Unknown date ==
List of shipwrecks: Unknown date 1851
Ship	State	Description
America Vespuzzi	Flag unknown	The ship was driven ashore near Tenedos, Ottoman Empire before 11 July. She was on a voyage from the Danube to a British port. She was refloated.
Astrea	Netherlands	The galiot struck a sunken rock and sank off Brest, Finistère, France. She was on a voyage from "Port Lanney" to London, United Kingdom.
Cheviot	United Kingdom	The ship was driven ashore in the Dardanelles before 11 July. She was on a voyage from Liverpool, Lancashire to Constantinople, Ottoman Empire.
Cosmopolite	France	The Havre whaleship went ashore in the Bering Strait. On July 15 one of her boats found the ship China (United States), of New Bedford, which rescued her 40-man crew. After saving 700 barrels of her cargo of whale and sperm oil, the wreck was set afire.
Isabella	United Kingdom	The schooner foundered in the Atlantic Ocean 60 nautical miles (110 km) west of Vigo, Spain. Her crew were rescued. She was on a voyage from Liverpool, Lancashire to Seville, Spain.
May 20	United Kingdom	The brig foundered in the Atlantic Ocean before 5 July.
Pekin	United Kingdom	The ship ran aground in the Columbia River at Fort Vancouver, Columbia District and was abandoned by her crew.
Petite Marie	United Kingdom	The ship was driven ashore and wrecked on the coast of Mexico before 10 July. She was on a voyage from Bordeaux, Gironde to Tampico, Mexico.
Victoria	United Kingdom	The ship ran aground on a reef off Port Refuge, in the Cocos Islands. She was on a voyage from Batavia, Netherlands East Indies to Port Phillip, South Australia. She was refloated, resuming her voyage on 28 July.
