= Deans Cottage =

New Zealand heritage building

Coordinates: 43°31′36″S 172°35′50″E

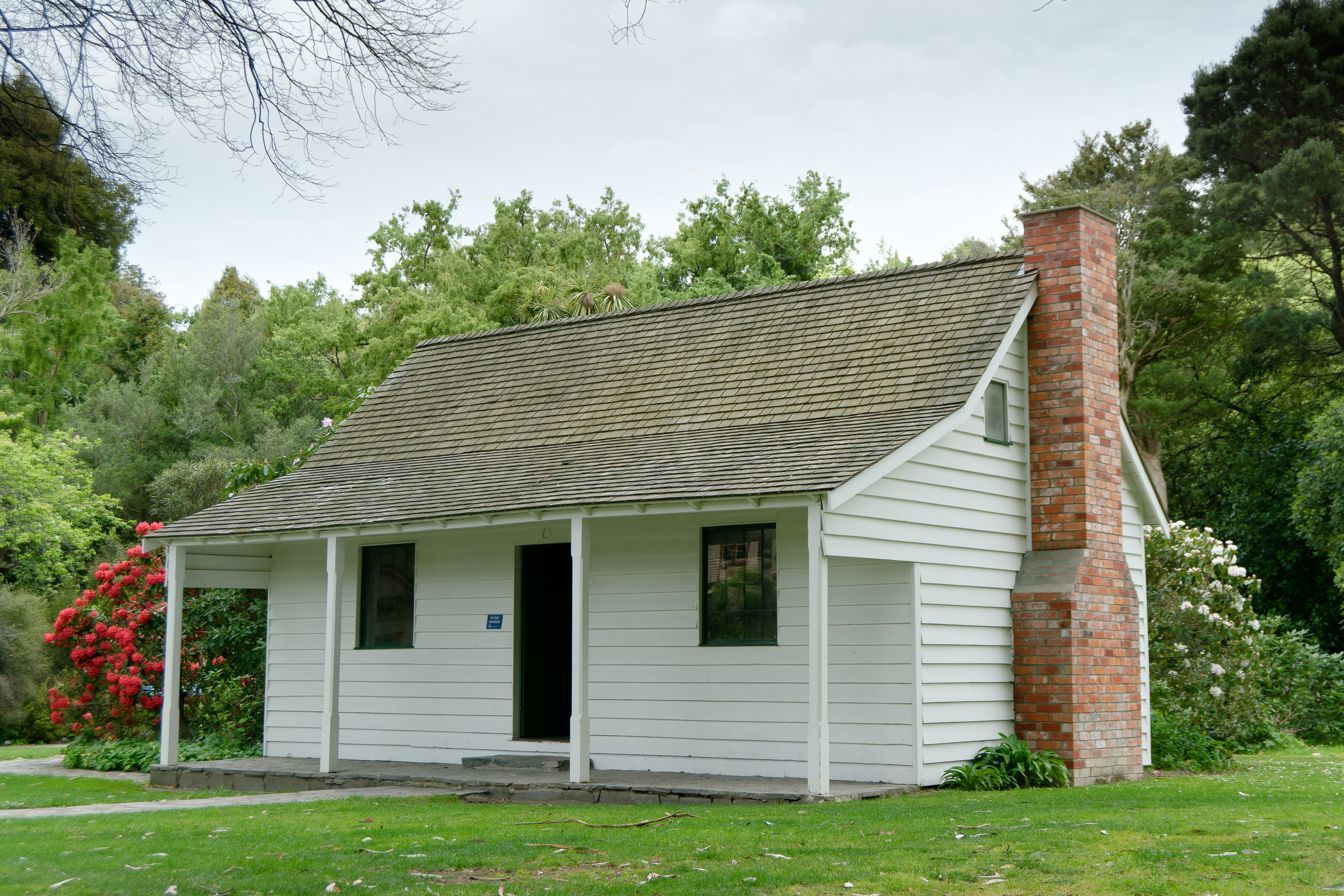
- Deans Cottage in 2025
- Interactive map of the Deans Cottage area
- Etymology: William and John Deans

General information
- Type: Cottage
- Location: Riccarton, 16 Kahu Road, Christchurch, New Zealand
- Completed: late 1843
- Relocated: 1947; 1970
- Renovated: 1889; 1947
- Owner: Christchurch City Council

Technical details
- Material: Timber; brick
- Floor count: one

Website
- Official

Heritage New Zealand – Category 1
- Designated: 2 April 1985
- Reference no.: 3679

References
- "Deans Cottage". New Zealand Heritage List/Rārangi Kōrero. Heritage New Zealand.

Deans Cottage is the oldest remaining building in Canterbury, New Zealand. Located in the Christchurch suburb of Riccarton, it was part of the Riccarton estate. Built in late 1843, members of the Deans family lived in the cottage until 1856. Today, the relocated cottage is a museum, placed between Riccarton House and Riccarton Bush.

== Early history ==
William Deans arrived on the Canterbury Plains in February 1843 with Samuel Manson and James Robinson Clough. Deans had chosen a location next to a lowland forest (now known as Riccarton Bush) as the site for his farm; land known to Māori as Pūtaringamotu. The land had previously been farmed from mid-1840 to mid-1841. Everything that had been built by the first settlers had been destroyed by a fire. The first house Deans built with his two helpers in February 1843 was a simple shed next to the bush. It was used by the Deans brothers (John Deans arrived in June 1843 with stock), Manson and his wife Jean, and John Gebbie and his wife Mary. In late 1843, Manson (a skilled carpenter) built a more substantial house for the Deans brothers; this is now known as the Deans Cottage. The other farm couples continued to live in the original cottage. Manson built a further cottage for the Gebbies in 1845, and also built a large shed with a milking stand, a stable and a calf house.

Deans Cottage was built from timber from the neighbouring bush. Kahikatea (white pine) was used for framing, weatherboards, and roof shingles. Trusses, floor boards and wall lining was made from mataī (black pine). The fireplace had a chimney made from cob. The cottage had two bedrooms, a sitting room (where the fireplace was) and a storage area in the loft. The kitchen was in the original building. Deans Cottage was lived in by the Deans brothers.

Deans Cottage was originally in a different location from where it is today; in fact the present location is its third. It was built closer to the Avon River / Ōtākaro than the other buildings, and on its true-right. (Note: True-left or true-right refer to the side of a river when looking in a downstream direction.) On that side of the river, it was the most downstream one of all the buildings.

William Deans died in July 1851 on a trip to New South Wales when his ship got wrecked at Cape Terawhiti. This event delayed John Deans' departure for Scotland by several months; he was due to go and marry his fiancée. He left in January 1852 and returned with his wife, Jane Deans (née McIlraith), in February 1853. The couple lived in Deans Cottage and their only son, John Deans II, was born in August 1853. By that time, John Deans was quite ill and he died from tuberculosis on 23 June 1854 in Deans Cottage.

Whilst John Deans had chosen and cleared a site for a larger house prior to his departure for Scotland, no further work was done on it before his death. It was left to his widow to start the project, and she moved into Riccarton House in March 1856. This ended the occupation of Deans Cottage by the Deans family.

== Renovations and relocations ==
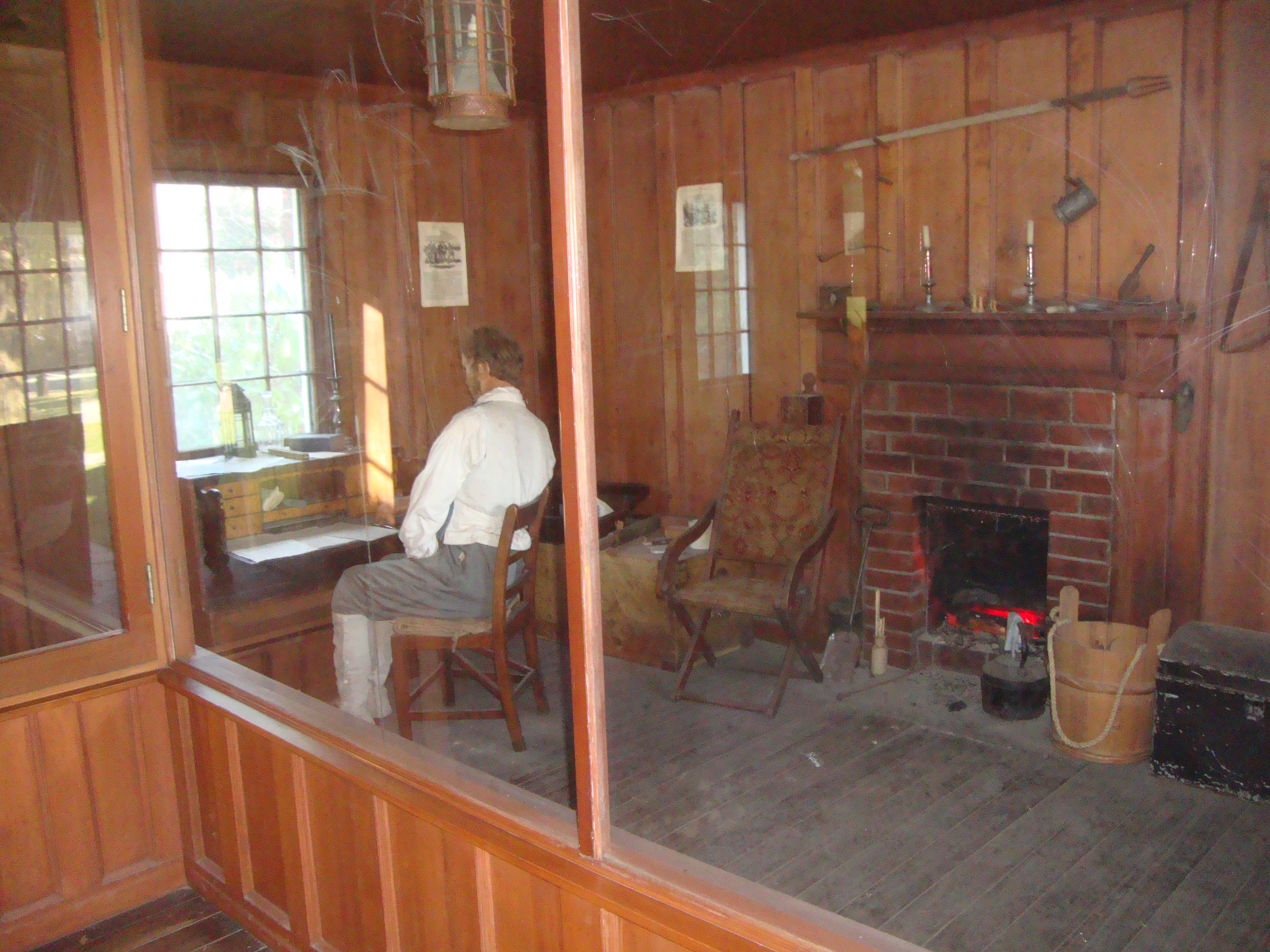
A mannequin representing John Deans is sitting at a desk in Deans Cottage

In 1889, Deans Cottage had its timber piles replaced by concrete foundations, and was re-roofed. In 1947, Deans Cottage was relocated by traction engine by some 170 metres (560 ft) to where the scout hall is currently located. In 1970, the cottage was moved to its current position, and is currently used as a museum.

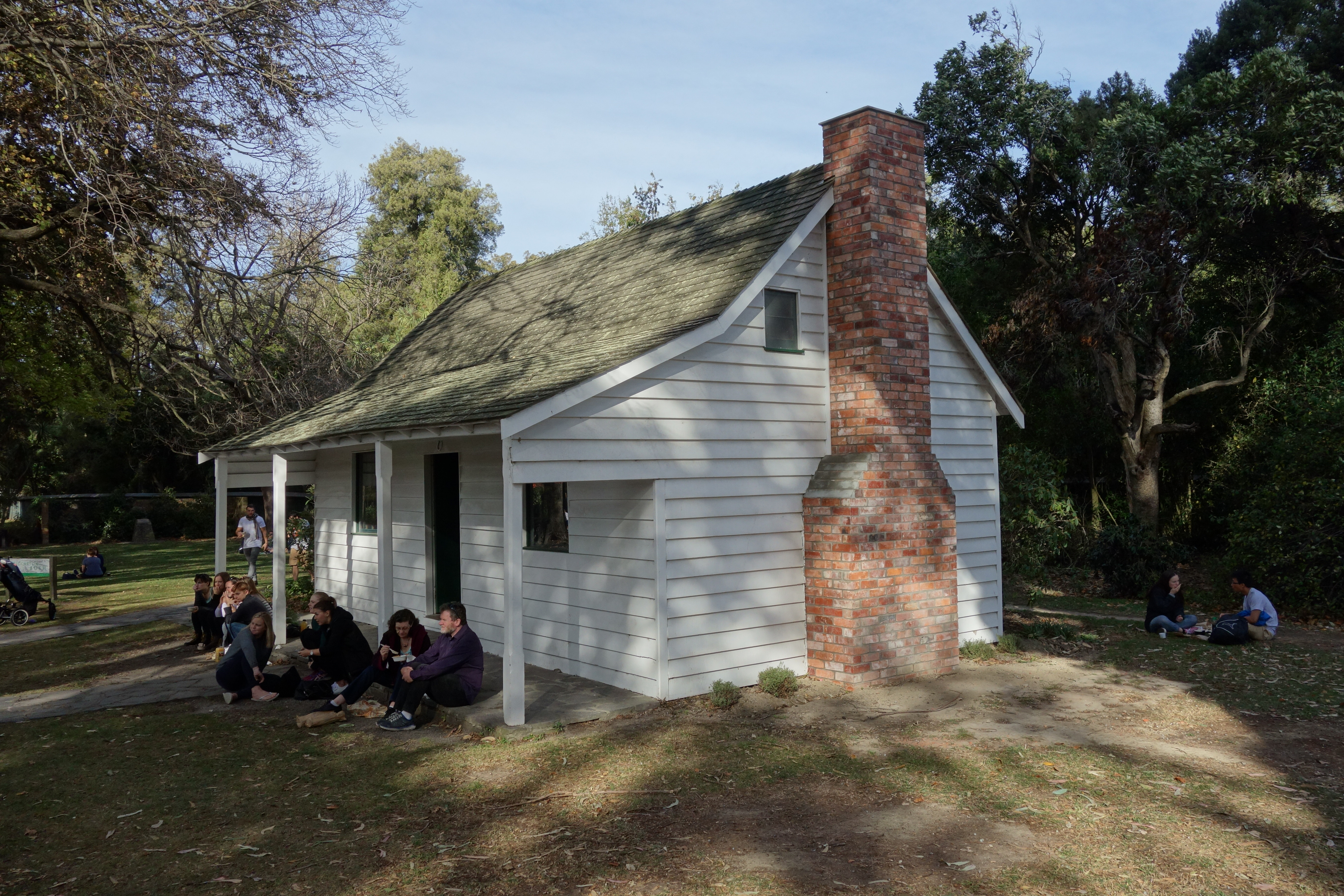
Deans Cottage in 2016

== Ownership ==
Christchurch City Council purchased most of the land, the bush, and the buildings from the Deans family in 1947. The last remaining piece of land, a triangle described by the Avon River, Kahu Road, and the drive to Riccarton House was purchased by the city council in 1975. The triangle was the site of most of the buildings constructed before 1855.

== Heritage registration ==
Deans Cottage was registered as a Category I heritage structure by the New Zealand Historic Places Trust (since renamed to Heritage New Zealand) on 2 April 1985.

== See also ==
List of oldest buildings in Christchurch
