= William Deans =

British pioneer and settler in Canterbury, New Zealand

- Born: Kirksyle, Riccarton, Ayrshire, Scotland
- Baptised: 31 January 1817
- Died: 23 July 1851 (aged 34) drowned at Cape Terawhiti
- Known for: Canterbury pioneer settler
- Relatives: John Deans (brother)

William Deans (baptised 31 January 1817 – 23 July 1851) was, together with his brother John, a pioneer farmer in Canterbury, New Zealand. He was born in Kirkstyle, Riccarton, Scotland. Their Riccarton farm in New Zealand was the first permanent settlement by immigrants on the Canterbury Plains.

Deans emigrated to Wellington, New Zealand, after buying land orders from the New Zealand Company in 1839. He arrived in what was then known as Port Nicholson (Wellington Harbour) on 22 January 1840 on the Aurora. Disappointed with what he found at Wellington, he started looking for other land. In Port Levy, he heard in mid 1842 of the large plains to the west of Banks Peninsula and travelling up the Avon River by whaleboat, he could eventually see from atop the shoulders of one of his travelling companions the lowland forest that became known as Riccarton Bush. He exclaimed: "That will do for me! I will make it my home."

Deans returned to Wellington and convinced his brother John, who had since emigrated to Nelson and was equally disappointed, to move to Canterbury. In February 1843, William Deans sailed south with two other families (Gebbie and Manson) who also wanted to settle in Canterbury. They took timber for a building with them that Samuel Manson, a skilled carpenter, erected for him. John Deans sailed from Wellington to New South Wales to buy stock. He arrived in Port Cooper (since renamed Lyttelton Harbour / Whakaraupō) in June 1843, having suffered the loss of many animals in the rough passage. 61 cattle, 3 mares and 43 sheep eventually arrived at their farm. In late 1843, Manson built another house. That building is still in existence and is known as Deans Cottage.

In December 1846, the Deans brothers signed a 21-year lease with a Māori chief, Te One, for land within 6 miles (9.7 km) of their farm. From 1848, they had to negotiate about land with first the New Zealand Company and then the Canterbury Association, after Canterbury had been bought from Māori in Kemp's Deed. Once a provisional agreement had been arrived at in May 1851, William Deans sailed for Australia to obtain more stock. His ship, the Maria, foundered at Cape Terawhiti and Deans was drowned on 23 July 1851.

Earlier in 1851, George Grey as governor had invited Deans to join the New Zealand Legislative Council. As the council was meeting in Wellington, Deans had declined as it was "quite out of [his] way". A homestead, Riccarton House, was built on the Riccarton property in 1856, five years after William Deans' death.
