= Henry John Cridland =

New Zealand land surveyor, architect, and artist (1821–1867)

- Born: 1821; Somerset, England
- Died: 1867 (aged 45–46); Christchurch, New Zealand
- Occupations: Architect, surveyor

Henry John Cridland (1821–1867) was a New Zealand architect and surveyor. Cridland started his architectural career in Wellington but later was appointed as Superintendent of Public Works to the Canterbury Association, which saw him survey and develop Lyttelton, Christchurch, and Kaiapoi. Most of Cridland's work has since been demolished with his best surviving work being St Andrew's Church, Christchurch.

== Early life ==
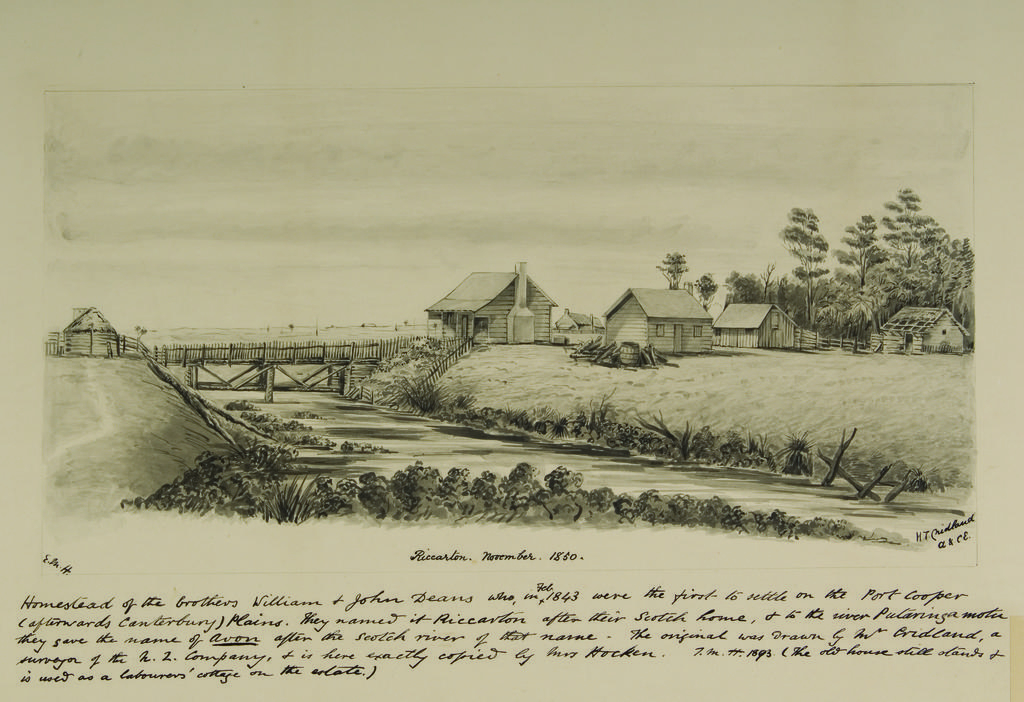
An 1893 copy of an 1850 painting of the Riccarton Estate and Deans Cottage by Cridland

Cridland was born in Somerset, England in 1821. Cridland married his wife Mary c.1837 in London. She eloped to marry Cridland.

== Life in New Zealand ==
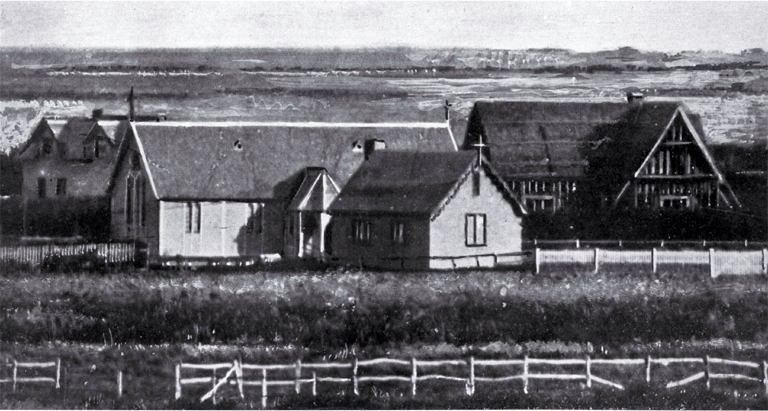
St Andrew's Church in 1858, before modifications

Cridland arrived in Wellington with his wife and first child on the Ursula. Cridland took up employment as a survey draughtsman with the New Zealand Company, before moving into architecture.

Cridland came to New Zealand with the patent for Oropholithe, a material invented in France for roofing. The material was used on a store on Lambton Quay but no other recorded usage exists suggesting that the material was not useful. In Wellington, Cridland owned his own sawmill and brickworks, allowing him to have stable prices for materials when supplying estimates. In 1846 Cridland submitted a design for Henry Samuel Chapman's house in Karori but his design was unpopular. Cridland's house was seriously damaged in the 1848 Marlborough earthquake.

Cridland went on to design St Peter's Church, Te Aro in 1848 (Note: This was replaced with a larger church in 1879) and St James Church, Lower Hutt in 1849. (Note: This was replaced with a larger church in 1880) Cridland was appointed Superintendent of Public Works for the Canterbury Association, which saw him move to Christchurch and making Cridland the first architect in Canterbury. In this role Cridland was working as a surveyor and engineer. In 1849 Cridland laid out the location of the Lyttleton to Sumner road. Christchurch's first church, St Michaels, was designed by Cridland and built in 1851. (Note: Replaced in 1871) Cridland was the first to survey Kaiapoi. Cridland gained certification as a civil engineer in 1854. During the same year he was working as a rent collector in Lyttleton. In 1856 Cridland designed St Andrew's Church, Christchurch, according to Jonathan Mane-Wheoki, St Andrew's was the last building designed by Cridland. That same year Cridland built the Rise Cottage, possibly the first house constructed to the west of the Avon River.

In c.1864–1865 Cridland purchased a station near Ashburton named Scarness, that he renamed to Spaxton. Around this time Cridland was involved in surveying the Rangitata Plains. He also had 800 acres (320 ha) of land at Hoon Hay.

== Personal life ==
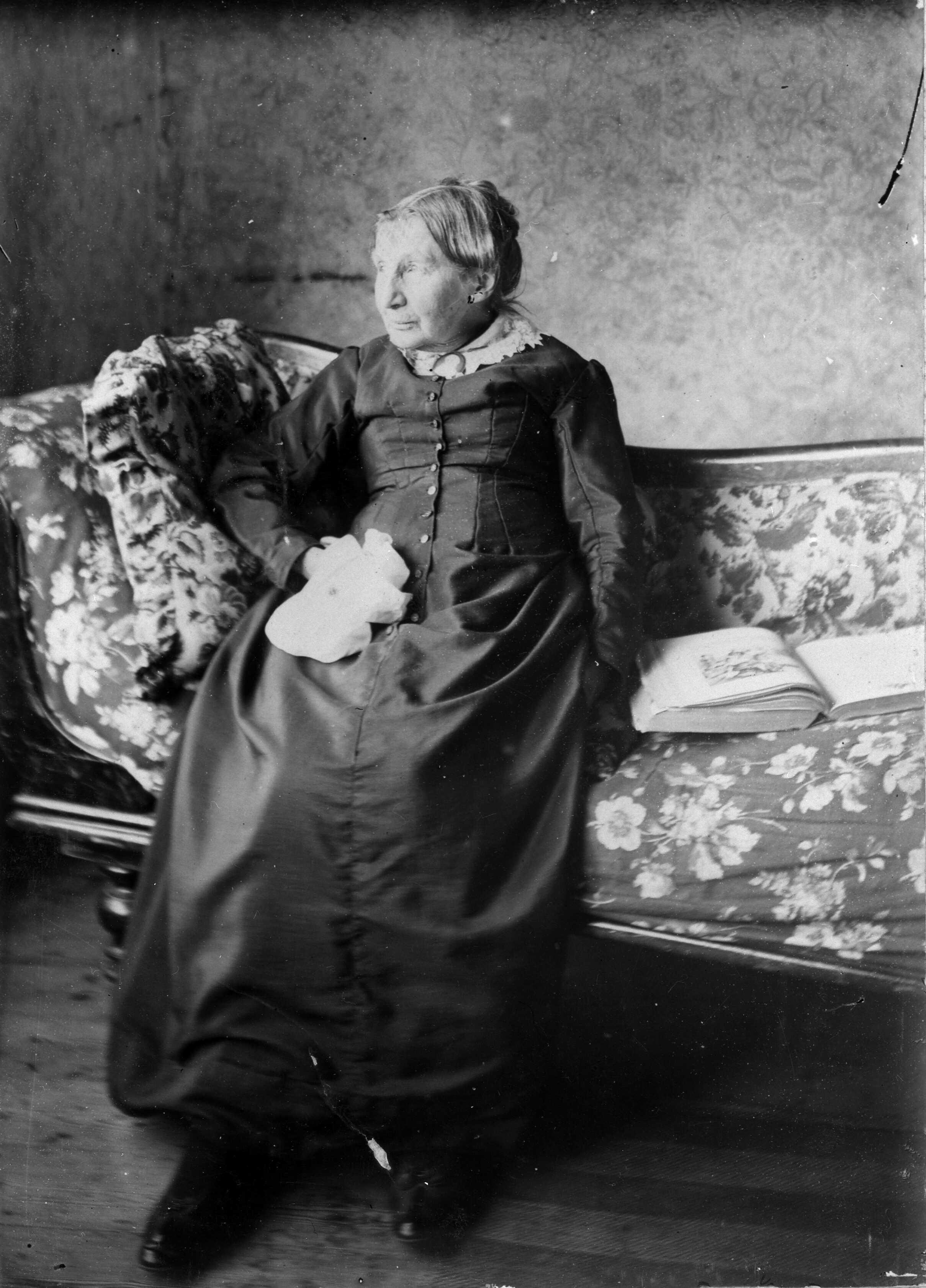
Mary Cridland c.1900

Cridland left his wife a property at York Bay, where she lived following Cridland's death until she died in 1902.

Cridland was friends with the politician Robert Hart.

In 1866 Cridland suffered from a stroke, he died the following year at his Colombo Street home with the death being attributed to over-exerting himself with exhaustion being listed on his death certificate.

== Legacy ==
Cridland Street in Kaiapoi is named for Cridland.

In 1850 Cridland painted Deans Cottage, a copy of this painting is held in the Hocken Collections.

According to Cridland's entry in The Concise Dictionary of New Zealand Artists his drawings are historically significant.

== List of buildings ==
Name	Date	Image	Note	Ref
St Peter's Church, Te Aro	1848		Replaced in 1879	
St James Church, Lower Hutt	1849		Replaced in 1880	
St Michael's Church, Christchurch	1851		Cridland based his design off of work of the English architect George Gilbert Scott Replaced in 1871.	
St Andrew's Church, Christchurch	1856		Has been expanded and altered significantly but the original design remains. Registered as a category 1 building with Heritage New Zealand	
