= Maria (1836 ship) =

History

United Kingdom
- Name: Maria
- Owner: Various
- Builder: Yarmouth
- Launched: 1836
- Fate: Wrecked 1851

General characteristics
- Type: Barque
- Tons burthen: 1836:420 (bm); 1849:460 (bm) after repairs
- Propulsion: Sail

The barque Maria was launched at Yarmouth in 1836. Maria was originally used on the England to Bombay run in the 1830s. She sank with the loss of 28 lives on 23 July 1851 near Cape Terawhiti on the North Island of New Zealand. Only two crew members survived.

== Description ==
Maria was a barque built at Yarmouth in 1836 and originally owned by J Somes to 1838, then Gardiner and Co. Her masters were Humble to 1838, Black to 1839, Johnstone to 1845, and Stevenson in 1846. In 1839, 1844 and 1947 she was sheathed with yellow metal. Repairs increased her burthen from 420 to 460 tons when she returned to service in 1849.

== Captain Plank's voyages ==
Plank was an English sea captain. His earlier vessel was Paragon. In 1844 he was transporting mahogany from Honduras to England. In 1849 he assumed command of Maria.

On 23 March 1849 Maria, under Captain Plank, transported convicts from Dublin to Hobart. She departed Dublin on 5 April 1849 and arrived 23 July. The superintending surgeon was Edward Nollitts. She had embarked 166 female convicts, one of whom died on the voyage.

Maria then sailed via Sydney to Honolulu to California with 170 passengers, arriving at Honolulu on 17 December, The journey having taken 66 days from Sydney. She returned to Sydney from San Francisco via Tahiti.

She made another voyage to California in 1850, returning to Sydney in July after an eventful voyage with 28 passengers and 20 shipwrecked sailors. She had sailed via Tahiti, the Navigators, and Horn Island. Two days after leaving the Navigators, Nortoa, the second mate, had stabbed two men and then jumped overboard. Attempts to rescue him were unsuccessful. In September she again sailed from Sydney to San Francisco, reaching there on 4 January 1851.

Maria had come to Wellington, New Zealand from California in April 1851 with a 260 tons of coal, having sailed on 22 February. While she was there Charles Clifford chartered her to convey livestock to the Canterbury settlement. Two shipments were taken to Lyttelton, the first in May and the second in June.

== Final voyage ==
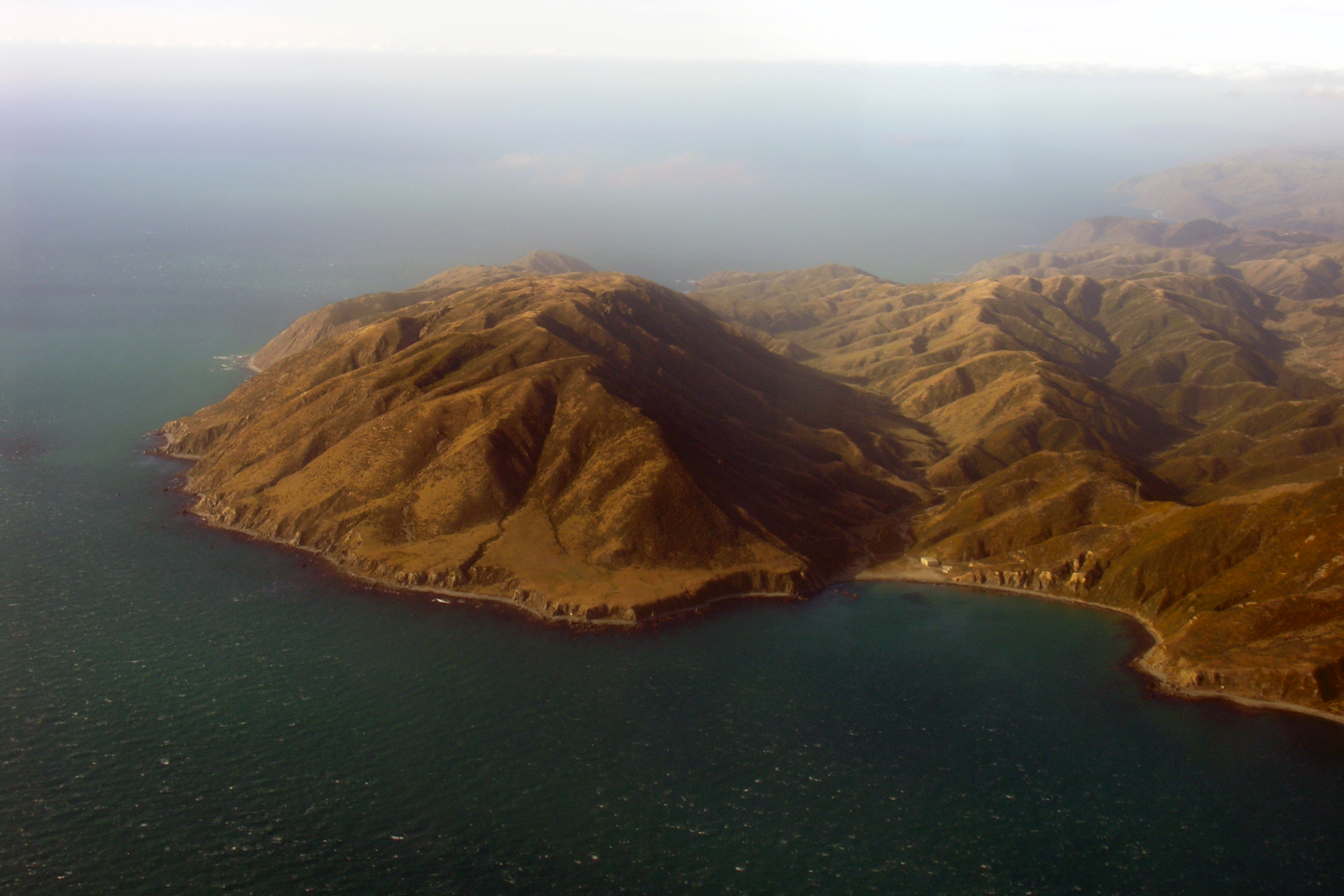
Cape Terawhiti seen from an aeroplane.

Captain Plank sailed Maria from Lyttelton for Wellington on 20 July 1851. She had onboard 22 crew and six passengers. At 6am on 24 July, she struck a submerged rock at Ohariu Bay, to the north of Cape Terawhiti. Maria broke in two about 400m from shore.

The passengers and crew attempted to lower the ship's boat but the lowering mechanism broke, killing several people. The survivors then tried to reach shore using salvaged material as a raft. The raft was dashed into the rocks near the shore, killing almost all on it. Only two crewmen survived, a Malay and Stewart, an ordinary seaman who had been at the wheel at the time of the accident; in all 26 lives were lost.

Eleven bodies were recovered, of whom all but one were buried close to the site of the wreck. The body of Captain Plank was taken to Wellington and buried in the city's cemetery.

Among the dead were two Canterbury settlers, G.P. Wallace of Wellington and William Deans of Riccarton. William and his brother, John Deans, had established Homebush, a sheep and cattle station near Darfield.

== Outcome ==
As a result of this accident there was a strong call upon the government to construct a lighthouse. A public meeting was held calling for action. The Pencarrow Head Lighthouse, the first lighthouse built in New Zealand, commenced operations in 1859.
