= St Andrew's Church, Christchurch =

Coordinates: 43.5190201°S 172.6165535°E

St Andrew's Church
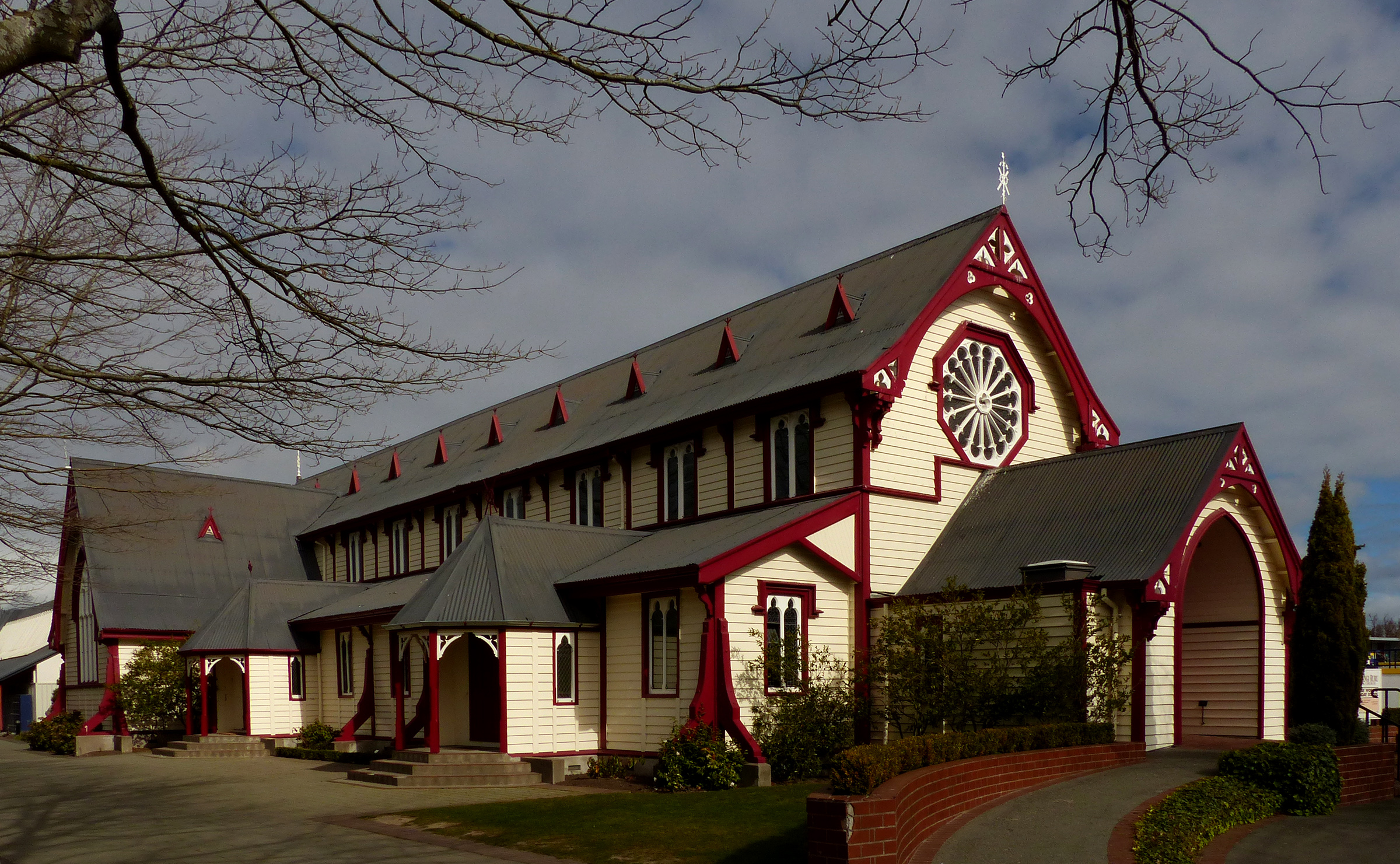
- Location: Rangi Ruru Girls' School, Merivale, Christchurch
- Country: New Zealand
- Denomination: Presbyterian

Architecture
- Architect: Henry John Cridland
- Architectural type: Gothic Revival style

Heritage New Zealand – Category 1
- Designated: 7 April 1983
- Reference no.: 304

St Andrew's Church is a historic church located at Rangi Ruru Girls' School in Christchurch, New Zealand. It was the first Presbyterian church to be built in Christchurch. It is registered as a category 1 building by Heritage New Zealand. The building was designed in the Gothic Revival style and first opened for worship on 1 February 1857.

== Description ==
St Andrew's is a Gothic church. The interior has exposed timber trusses with dado panels and a dentilled dado rail decorating the lower walls. The rose window uses wood instead of stone for the tracery. The original part of the church is constructed from totara sourced from Pigeon Bay.

== History ==
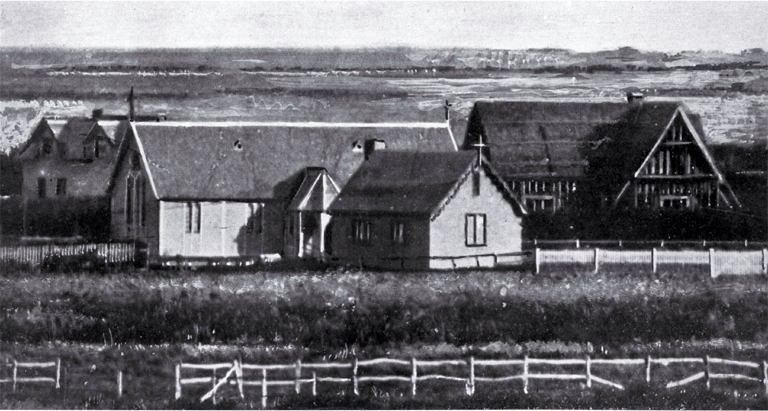
St Andrew's Church prior to modifications, 1858

In 1854 a committee was set up to establish a Presbyterian church for Christchurch. The committee was granted a plot of land on the corner of Tuam and Oxford terrace from the Government. The committee also requested a minister be sent from Scotland. Charles Fraser was chosen and arrived in Christchurch in 1856. Architect Henry John Cridland designed a Gothic structure. St Andrew's opened 1 February 1857.

Initially the church measured 54 ft (16 m) by 22 ft (6.7 m). St Andrew's was expanded over time to meet the demands of a growing population and congregation, with a nave added c.1862 and the original part of the church becoming the transepts. In 1892 it was extended further, with architect Robert William England adding a rose window. 10 years later the church had a vestry and organ chancel were added. St Andrew's was held in high regard and considered the 'mother church' of Presbyterianism in the Canterbury Province in 1914.

Following the outward expansion of Christchurch and a decline in the population of the central city, St Andrew's began to lose its importance. By the 1980s the congregation had diminished and the church was nestled amongst larger buildings. On 29 March 1987 the church was split up into separate parts and transported to Rangi Ruru Girls' School, a Presbyterian school in Merivale. The nave was slightly enlarged as part of this. St Andrew's serves both the local parish and as the school chapel.

St Andrew's Church is registered as a category 1 building with Heritage New Zealand and scheduled with the Christchurch City Council due to St Andrew's association with many early Christchurch settlers, its place in the establishment of Presbyterianism in Canterbury, and architectural significance as a surviving example of Henry John Cridland's work. St Andrew's was the first wooden church constructed in Christchurch, and is one of few wooden churches still extant in the city. The former location of the church is known as St Andrew's Triangle and a memorial to St Andrew's was erected in 2006.

== See also ==
- Church of St Michael and All Angels, Christchurch
- List of oldest buildings in Christchurch
