= Jane Deans =

New Zealand pioneer and community leader

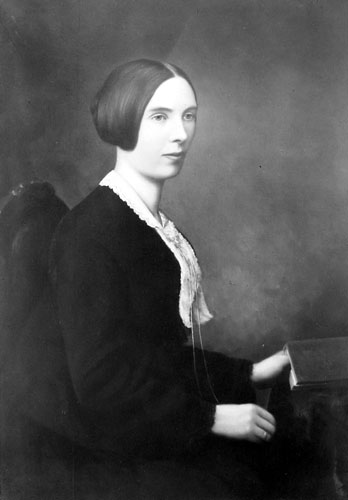
- Portrait of Jane Deans
- Born: 21 April 1823; Auchenflower, Ayrshire, Scotland
- Died: 19 January 1911 (aged 87); Riccarton, Christchurch, New Zealand
- Resting place: Barbadoes Street Cemetery
- Known for: Canterbury pioneer Riccarton House; Riccarton Bush
- Spouse: John Deans (m. 1852; d. 1854)
- Children: John Deans II

Jane Deans (née McIlraith, 21 April 1823 – 19 January 1911) was a New Zealand pioneer and community leader. She came to Christchurch in 1853 onto her husband's farm that he had established ten years earlier. Her husband died in the following year, and Deans became a community leader. The Christchurch suburb of Riccarton derives its name from the farm, and the historic buildings and the adjacent forest are popular places to visit.

== Life ==
Jane McIlraith was born in Auchenflower, Ayrshire, Scotland on 21 April 1823. She was the oldest child of Agnes Caldwell and James McIlraith.

John Deans, as a young man, worked for the McIlraith family to become familiar with farming techniques. Jane McIlraith became close to John during the two years he was with the family, but she felt that she could not marry a man who was living in the house. John Deans left to settle in New Zealand in 1842. In 1850, he asked her father for permission to marry her, but she would not travel by herself as an unmarried woman. Apparently, she even refused to travel to New Zealand with the Bishop Designate of Lyttelton, Thomas Jackson. Thus John Deans returned to Scotland to marry Jane on 15 September 1852 at Riccarton in East Ayrshire. They arrived in Lyttelton on the Minerva on 2 February 1853. Jane was very weak from seasickness and was also pregnant with her first child. Nevertheless, she travelled horseback over the Bridle Track over the Port Hills to the new settlement of Christchurch, spending a night at the Heathcote Parsonage as she travelled. Jane and John settled on the Deans farm, which the surveyor Joseph Thomas had agreed in 1848 would be named Riccarton, after the home parish of the Deans. Her son John was born on 6 August of that year.

Her husband died from tuberculosis on 23 June 1854, not before he had asked Jane to keep Riccarton Bush in perpetuity. Jane Deans remained at the farm in Riccarton for the rest of her life. She became active in the community and was regarded as a leader of pioneer women. She had Riccarton House built, where she died on 19 January 1911. Like her husband, she is buried at Barbadoes Street Cemetery.

== Commemoration ==
Deans Cottage, which was built in circa 1843 and where Jane and John first lived, is today the oldest building in Canterbury. It is registered by Heritage New Zealand as a Category I structure, with registration number 3679, and features as a museum. Riccarton House, which was built from circa 1855, is also registered as a Category I structure, with registration number 1868. Before the 2011 Christchurch earthquake, it featured as a function venue, but was subsequently closed for repairs for some years.

Riccarton Bush was donated by the Deans family to the people of Christchurch in 1914. At that time, it was formally protected through a campaign led by MP Harry Ell and botanist Dr. Leonard Cockayne. Today, the bush is administered by a trust. The bush contains mostly kahikatea of between 400 and 600 years of age; it is the only lowland forest left in Christchurch, and is probably New Zealand's oldest protected natural area. A predator-proof fence was installed in 2000, and the bush remains a popular urban visitor attraction.

The Christchurch suburb of Riccarton takes its name from the Riccarton farm. Jane Deans Close is a recent subdivision street in Riccarton. A memorial seat for Jane Deans is placed at the top of the Bridle Path near the Canterbury Pioneer Women's Memorial.

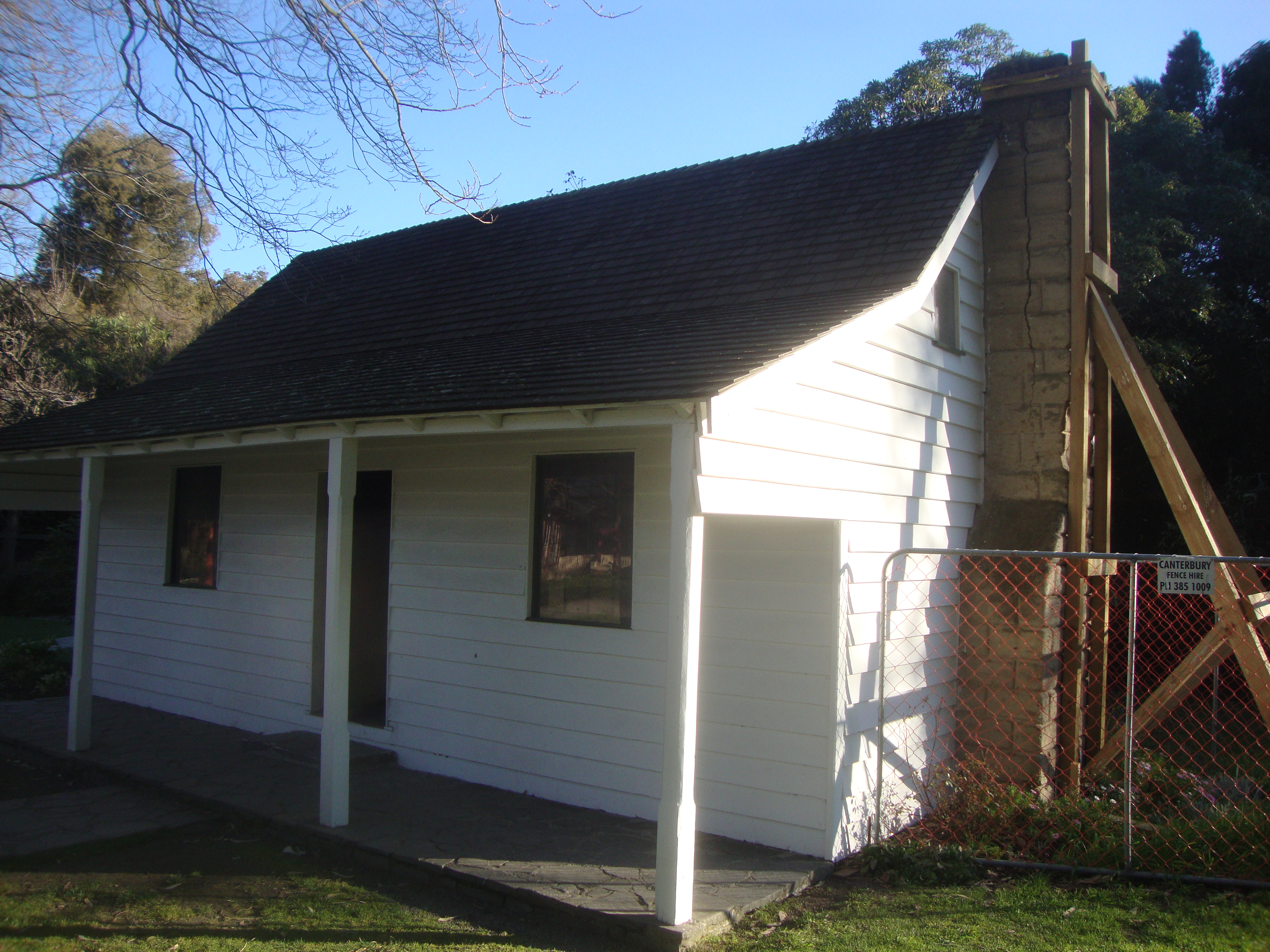
Deans Cottage in 2011 showing earthquake damage

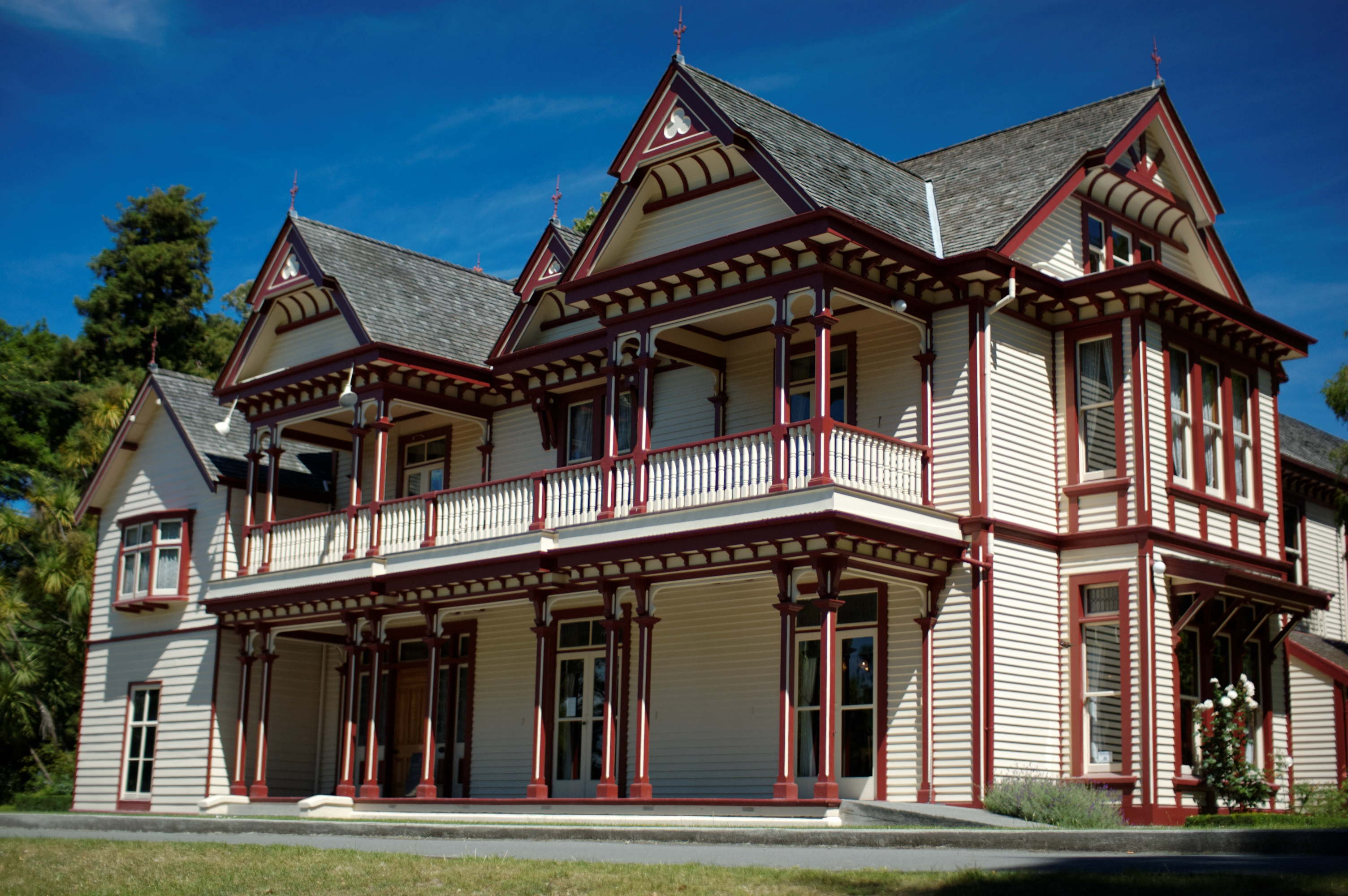
Riccarton house December 2008

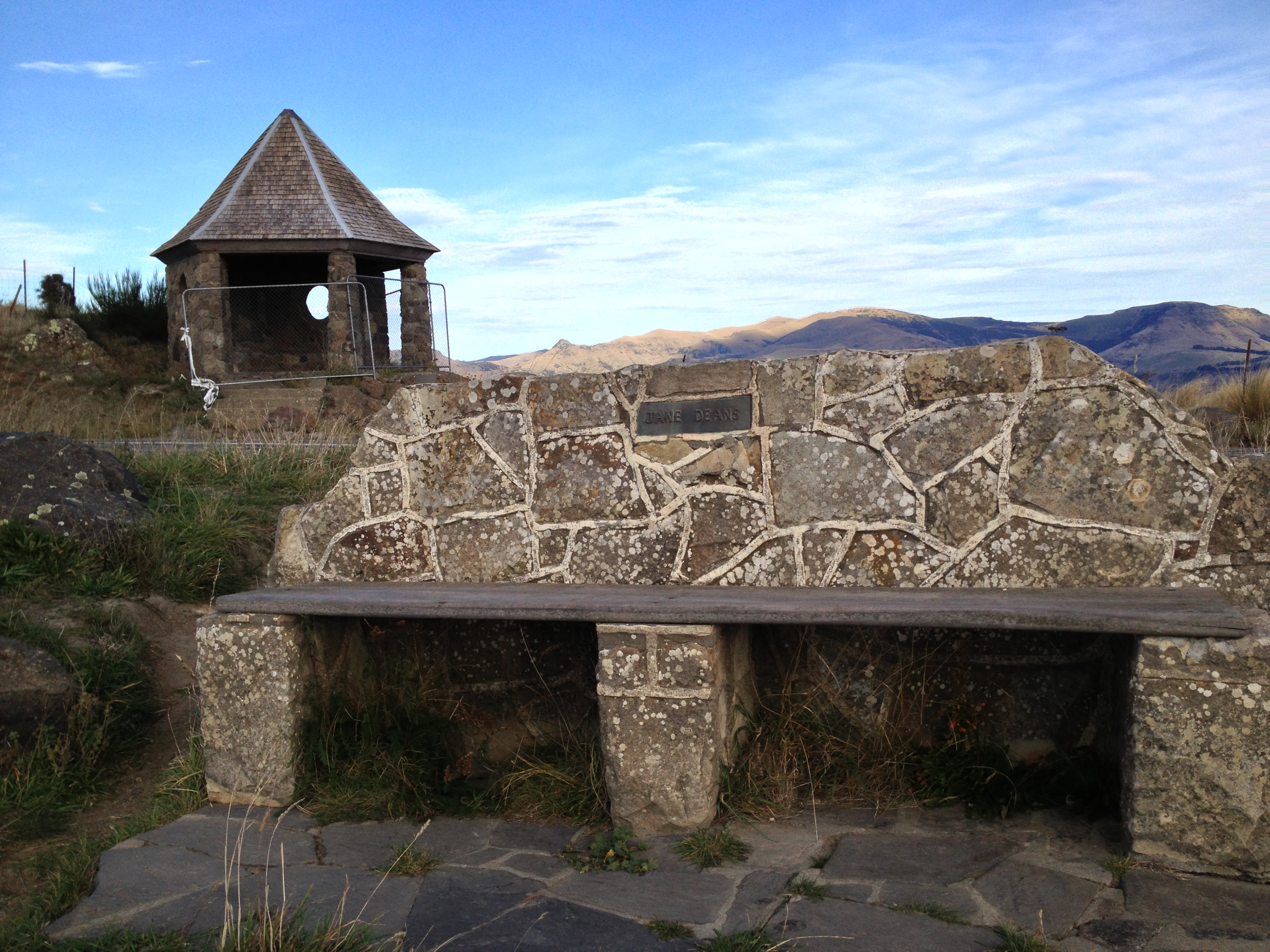
The Canterbury Pioneer Women's Memorial at the top of Bridle Path, with the Jane Deans memorial seat in the foreground
