= John Deans (pioneer) =

New Zealand pioneer and early settler in the Canterbury Region

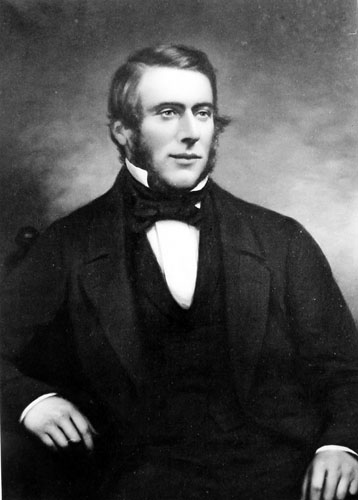
- Portrait of John Deans
- Born: 4 May 1820; Kirksyle, Riccarton, Ayrshire, Scotland
- Died: 23 June 1854 (aged 34); Riccarton, Christchurch, New Zealand
- Known for: Canterbury pioneer settler
- Spouse: Jane Deans (m. 1852)
- Children: John Deans II
- Relatives: William Deans (brother)

John Deans (4 May 1820 – 23 June 1854) was, together with his brother William, a pioneer farmer in Canterbury, New Zealand. He was born in Kirkstyle, Riccarton, Scotland. Their Riccarton farm in New Zealand was the first permanent settlement by immigrants on the Canterbury Plains. Deans returned to Scotland in 1852 to marry Jane McIlraith. They returned to New Zealand, where he died from tuberculosis at Riccarton Farm on 23 June 1854, not before he had asked Jane to keep the adjacent Riccarton Bush in perpetuity. The Deans had one son, also called John. The Deans brothers named the Christchurch river Avon after the stream on their grandfather's farm.

Jane and John Deans first lived in Deans Cottage, which was built in late 1843, and is now the oldest building in Canterbury. It is registered by Heritage New Zealand as a Category I structure and features as a museum. Jane Deans had Riccarton House built in 1855/56; a project that her husband wanted to do but that started only after his death. Riccarton House is also registered as a Category I structure and is today a restaurant and function centre.

Riccarton Bush was donated by the Deans family to the people of Christchurch in 1914. At that time, it was formally protected through a campaign led by MP Harry Ell and botanist Dr Leonard Cockayne. Today, the bush is administered by a trust. The bush contains mostly kahikatea of between 400 and 600 years of age; it is the only lowland forest left in Christchurch, and is probably New Zealand's oldest protected natural area. A predator-proof fence was installed in 2000, and the bush remains a popular urban visitor attraction.

The Christchurch suburb of Riccarton takes its name from the Riccarton farm.
