= Cape Alevina =

Cape on the Sea of Okhotsk

Coordinates: 58°50′N 151°20′E

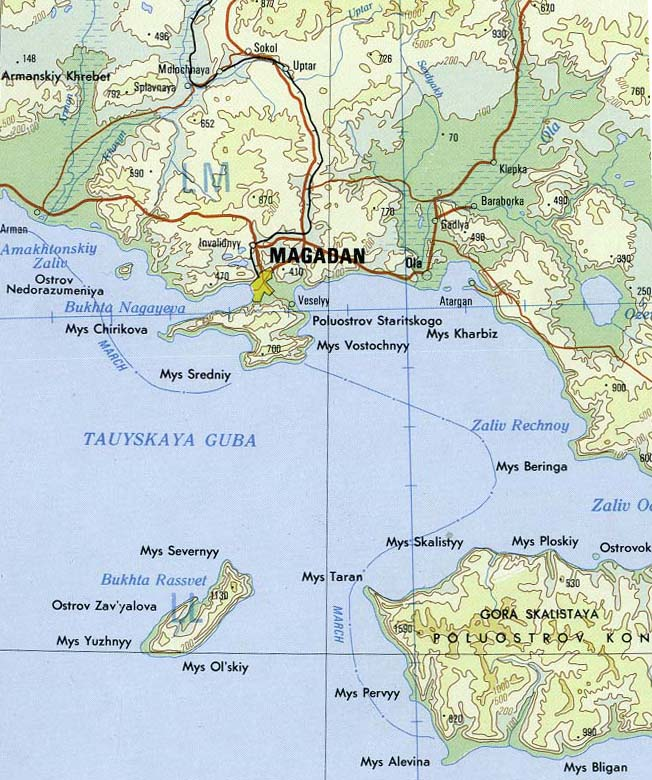
A 1978 map of the Magden area in Russia. Cape Alevina is at the bottom-right, labeled as "Mys Alevina".

Cape Alevina (Russian: Mys Alevina, Alevin Cape) is a cape on the northern side of the Sea of Okhotsk. It is on the Koni Peninsula and is the southernmost point of Magadan Oblast, Russia.

There is the Alevina Lighthouse on the cape (international code М 8021). Constructed during 1956-1958, it was officially announced in 1959.

== History ==
American whaleships hunted bowhead and gray whales off the cape between 1852 and 1866. On 12 July 1851 the ship Houqua (339 tons), Capt. Brown, of New Bedford, was wrecked on the rocks about two miles east of the cape during a fog. Her crew was found on the beach two weeks later by the ship Canton (409 tons), Capt. J. Allen, of the same port, which also salvaged 1,100 of 2,700 bbls of whale oil left aboard the wreck before it broke up. One side of the bows with the night heads – as well as some spars and driftwood – from the wreck were still visible high up on the rocks two years later.

== Climate ==
Cape Alevina has a transitional arctic tundra/subarctic climate (Köppen climate classification ET/Dfc) with very cold, long winters and short, rather cool summers.

Climate data for Cape Alevina (Climate ID:25916)
Month	Jan	Feb	Mar	Apr	May	Jun	Jul	Aug	Sep	Oct	Nov	Dec	Year
Record high °C (°F)	5.5 (41.9)	7.1 (44.8)	6.9 (44.4)	9.3 (48.7)	17.4 (63.3)	21.5 (70.7)	26.1 (79.0)	26.1 (79.0)	18.6 (65.5)	12.3 (54.1)	6.9 (44.4)	7.4 (45.3)	26.1 (79.0)
Mean daily maximum °C (°F)	−8.8 (16.2)	−9.9 (14.2)	−6.7 (19.9)	−1.6 (29.1)	3.5 (38.3)	8.8 (47.8)	12.2 (54.0)	12.9 (55.2)	9.8 (49.6)	3.9 (39.0)	−2.5 (27.5)	−6.6 (20.1)	1.2 (34.2)
Daily mean °C (°F)	−11.2 (11.8)	−12.6 (9.3)	−9.5 (14.9)	−4.1 (24.6)	1.0 (33.8)	5.8 (42.4)	9.5 (49.1)	10.4 (50.7)	7.5 (45.5)	1.7 (35.1)	−4.7 (23.5)	−8.7 (16.3)	−1.2 (29.8)
Mean daily minimum °C (°F)	−13.9 (7.0)	−15.3 (4.5)	−12.3 (9.9)	−6.5 (20.3)	−1.0 (30.2)	3.5 (38.3)	7.2 (45.0)	8.1 (46.6)	5.3 (41.5)	−0.5 (31.1)	−7.0 (19.4)	−11.2 (11.8)	−3.6 (25.5)
Record low °C (°F)	−28.7 (−19.7)	−29.6 (−21.3)	−26.6 (−15.9)	−20.9 (−5.6)	−11.7 (10.9)	−3.1 (26.4)	1.5 (34.7)	−1.1 (30.0)	−3.9 (25.0)	−16.1 (3.0)	−23.5 (−10.3)	−30 (−22)	−30 (−22)
Average precipitation mm (inches)	24.4 (0.96)	16.1 (0.63)	25.4 (1.00)	16.5 (0.65)	24.0 (0.94)	39.6 (1.56)	64.9 (2.56)	91.6 (3.61)	71.9 (2.83)	60.5 (2.38)	51.9 (2.04)	38.6 (1.52)	525.4 (20.68)
Source: Roshydromet
