= Cape Terāwhiti =

Southwesternmost point of the North Island of New Zealand

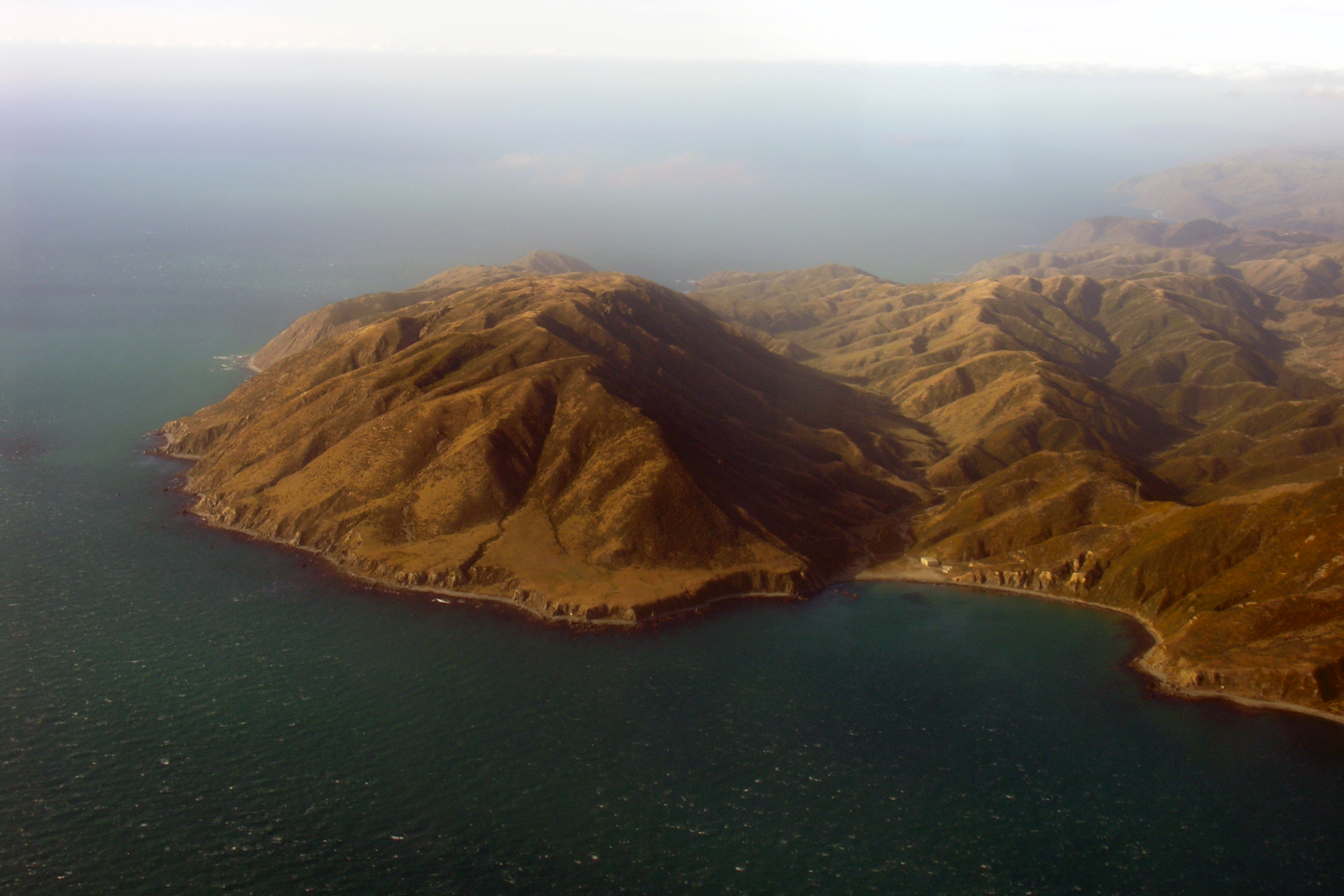
- Cape Terāwhiti seen from an aeroplane
- Interactive map of Cape Terāwhiti
- Coordinates: 41.2844°S 174.6133°E
- Location: Wellington Region

Cape Terāwhiti is the southwesternmost point of the North Island of New Zealand.

The cape is located 16 kilometres (10 mi) to the west of Wellington, the capital city of New Zealand. Ohau Point, located on the northern tip of Cape Terāwhiti and, along with Perano Head on Arapaoa Island in the Marlborough Sounds, marks the narrowest part of Cook Strait.

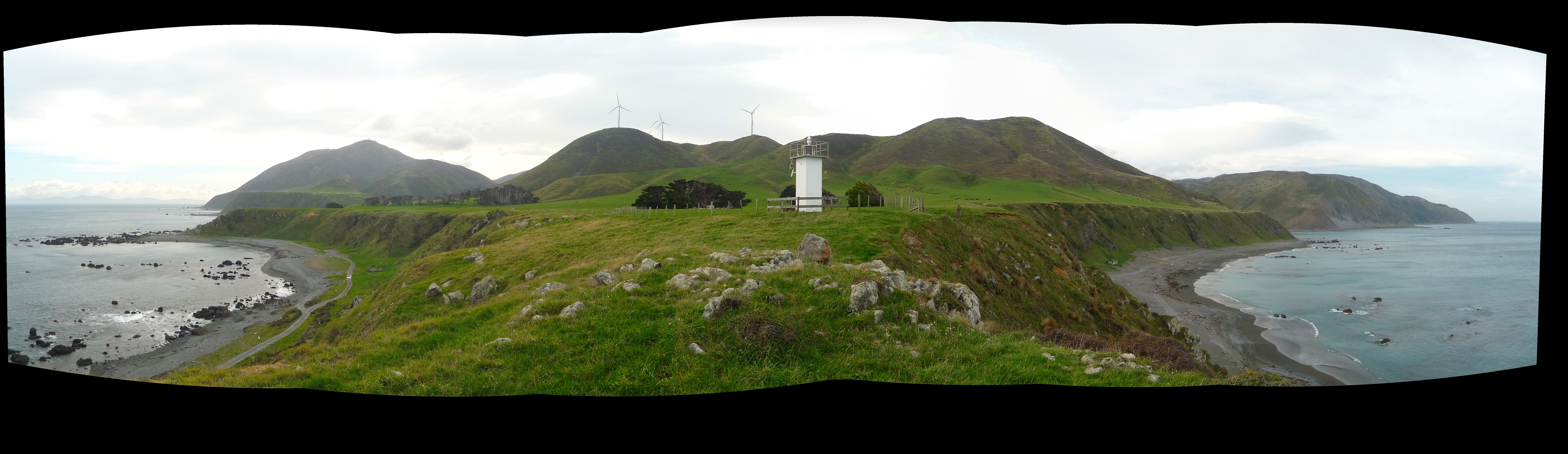
Panorama looking inland from Tongue Point near Cape Terāwhiti (on left of image), Wellington South Coast, New Zealand

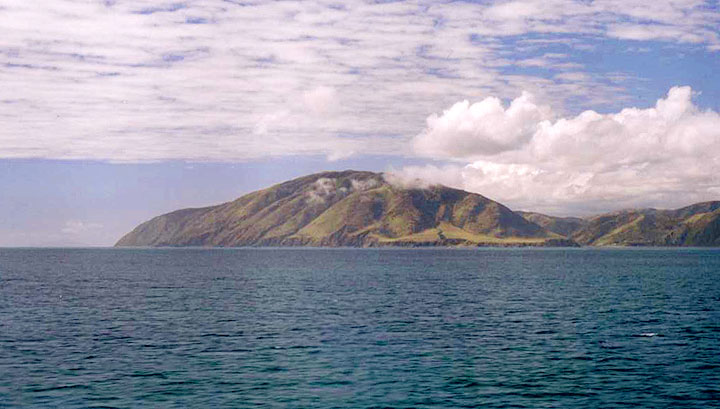
Cape Terāwhiti seen from on board the Cook Strait ferry

It is also the closest point in the North Island to the South Island, with West Head, at the mouth of the Tory Channel being only 28 kilometres (17.4 mi) away (this point in the South Island lies to the northwest of Cape Terāwhiti).

Cape Terāwhiti, from which historic Terawhiti Station gets its name, came into being through a misconception of Captain Cook’s Tahitian interpreter, Tupaea. When, in 1769, Cook asked what the land in the east was, the local Maori replied simply, 'the east'. In fact Te Ra-whiti (The Rising Sun) is the general Maori term for the East Coast of the North Island. Omere is said to be the original name of Cape Terawhiti.

At the southern end of Cape Terāwhiti is Oteranga Bay, the termination point for the inter-island Cook Strait power cable. The correct Te Reo name for the bay is Oterongo. This bay has connections to the iwi Te Āti Awa and was the site of a village of Ngāti Awa.

The Maria, on its way from Lyttelton Harbour to Wellington, foundered at Cape Terāwhiti on 23 July 1851, with the loss of 26 lives and 2 survivors. One of those drowned was the early Canterbury settler William Deans. Gold was found near Cape Terāwhiti in 1862 and was mined for several years.

There are marine terraces off Cape Terāwhiti that were been mapped in the early 1970s.
