= Riccarton House =

Historic building in Christchurch, New Zealand

Coordinates: 43°31′36″S 172°35′52″E

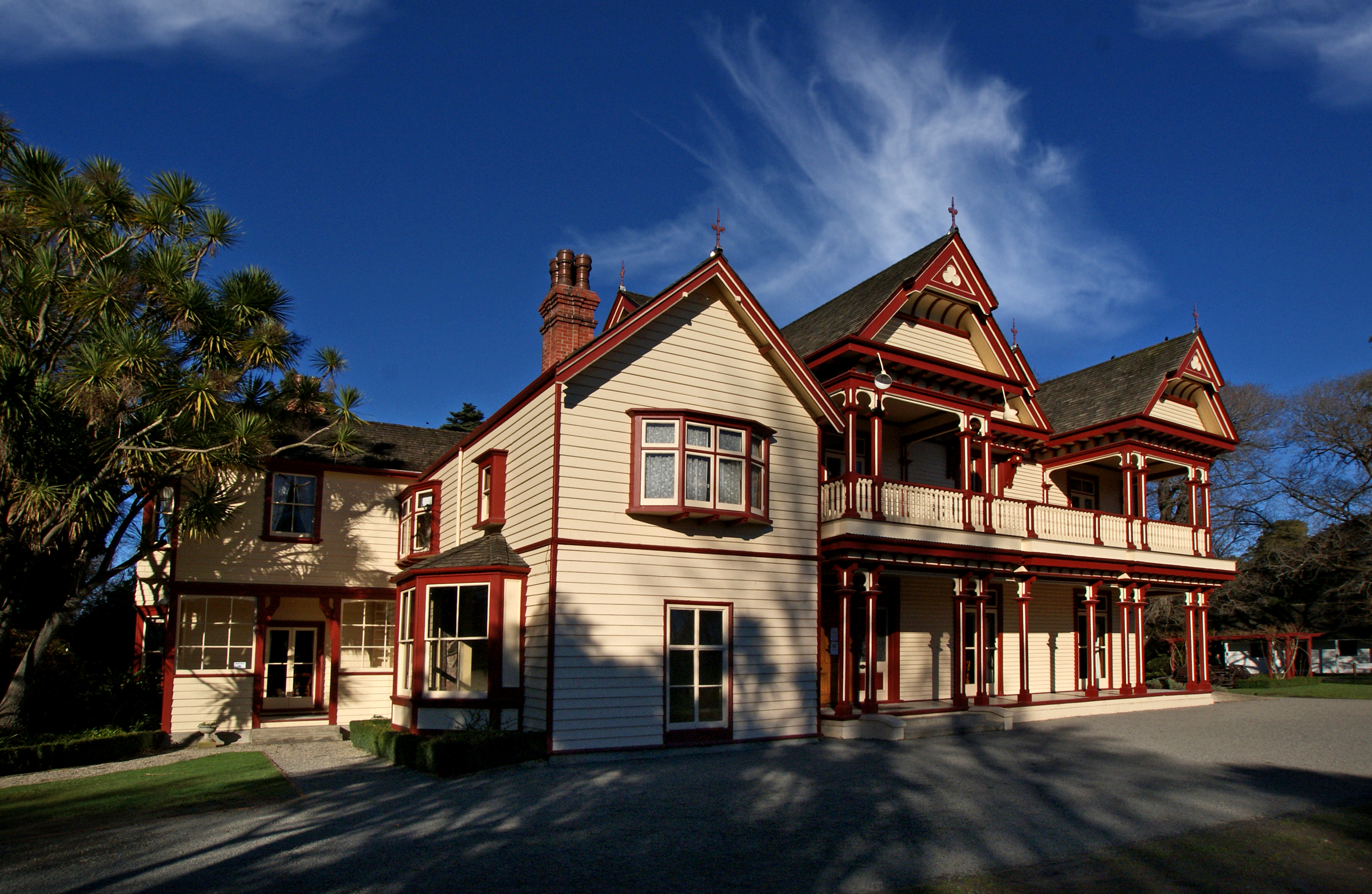
- Riccarton House in 2010
- Interactive map of the Riccarton House area
- Etymology: Riccarton, Ayrshire

General information
- Type: Homestead
- Architectural style: Victorian and Edwardian
- Location: 16 Kahu Road, Riccarton, Christchurch, New Zealand
- Groundbreaking: 1855
- Completed: 1856
- Closed: 22 February 2011 – June 2014
- Owner: Christchurch City Council

Technical details
- Material: Timber; brick
- Floor count: two

Design and construction
- Architect: Robert England (1900 extension)

Renovating team
- Architect: Tony Ussher
- Main contractor: Simon Construction

Website
- Official

Heritage New Zealand – Category 1
- Designated: 25 June 1992
- Reference no.: 1868

References
- "Riccarton House and Bush". New Zealand Heritage List/Rārangi Kōrero. Heritage New Zealand.

Riccarton House is an historic building in Christchurch, New Zealand. It is part of the Riccarton estate, the first area in Christchurch lived in by British settlers, after which the suburb of Riccarton is named. The house was commissioned by Jane Deans, the widow of Canterbury pioneer John Deans, and finished in 1856. It was twice extended; first in 1874, and the work carried out in 1900 more than doubled the size of the house. The Riccarton estate has in stages become the property of Christchurch City Council and Riccarton House itself was sold by the Deans family to the city in 1947. Damaged by the earthquakes in 2010 and 2011, the repaired and renovated building was reopened in June 2014. Riccarton House is used as a restaurant and for functions, and a popular market is held on Saturdays in front of it.

== History ==
Riccarton House was commissioned by Jane Deans (1823–1911) after the death of her husband, John Deans (1820–1854). It was built in three stages, with construction starting in 1855 and her moving in during March 1856. The house was first extended when her only son, John Deans II (1853–1902), turned 21 to house the many guests for the occasion. In 1900, the third stage of the house was built; this addition designed by the architect Robert England. The style contains elements of both Victorian and Edwardian architectures.

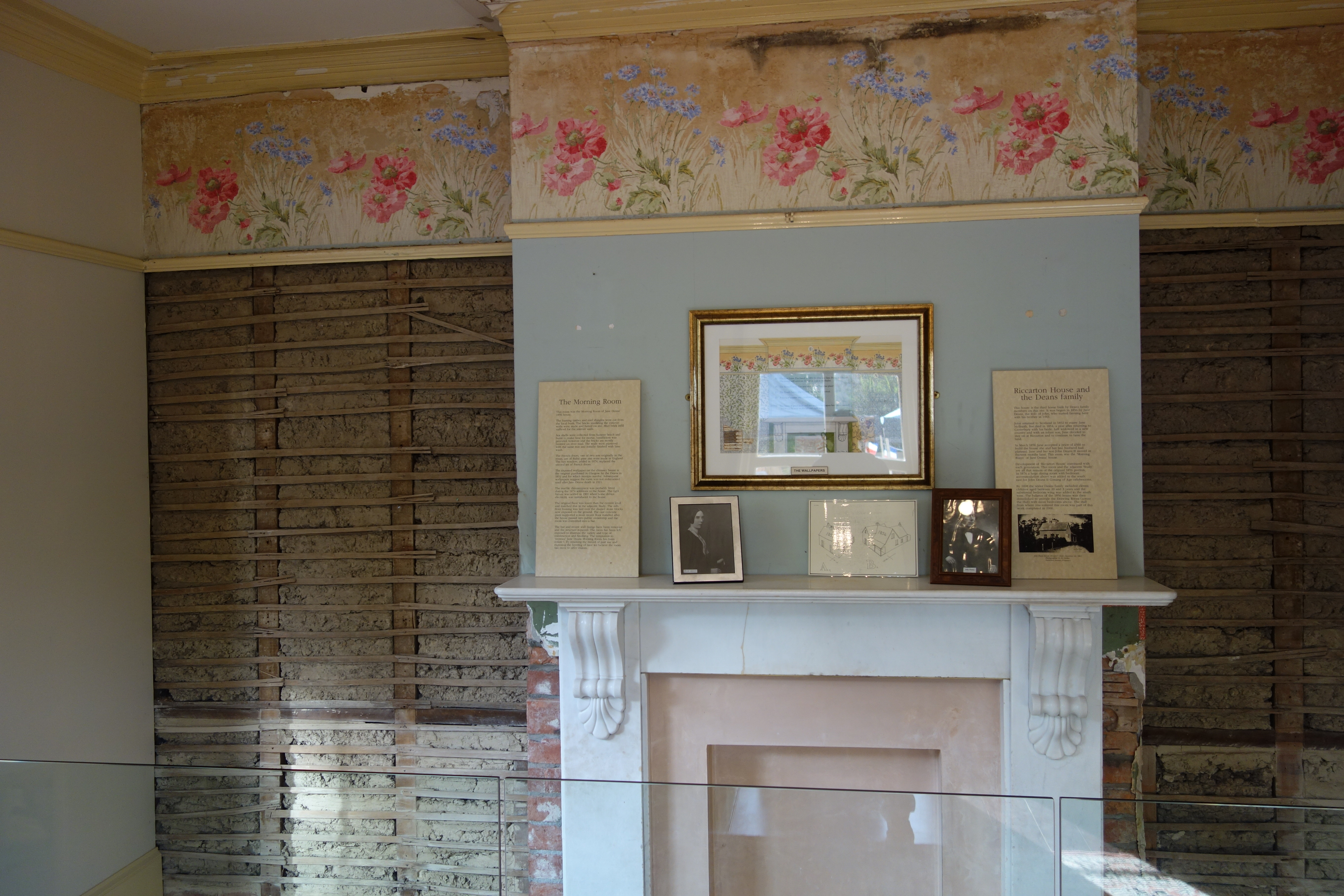
The downstairs morning room, with some building elements exposed to show construction techniques

The first stage of the house was built by James Johnston, the first commercial builder in Christchurch. Johnston built everything that was needed by the Riccarton farm between 1853 and 1870. The site for the house had been chosen by John Deans and cleared before his death, but no building work was undertaken during his lifetime. The two-storey house was modest. Trenches of 30 centimetres (12 in) depth for a concrete foundation were dug out. The gravel for the concrete was extracted from further downstream from the Avon River. Lime was burnt on site from shells collected on Sumner beach. Framing was made from mataī (black pine), weatherboards and floor boards were cut from kahikatea (white pine), and roof shingles were split from kahikatea. Many of the doors and windows were bought from surplus that John Watts-Russell had brought with him for his own house. The remaining windows and doors were made from tōtara. All the timber came from the adjacent bush. The outside walls were insulated by bricks made on site. Sand for the mortar is believed to have come from the Waimakariri River. Four rooms of the original house are still in existence: Jane Deans' bedroom upstairs and the adjacent night nursery, plus the morning room and back parlour downstairs.

In 1867, Jane Deans had a lean-to pantry added to the house. A substantial addition was made in 1874 so that she could host guest for her son's twenty-first birthday; his coming of age. The addition was made to the south-east. It included a dining room and a bathroom downstairs, plus an additional bedroom and bathroom upstairs. She had a dormer window fitted in her bedroom at the same time. The architect for the work was William Marley, who engaged George Rankin as the builder.

John Deans II commissioned Robert England to design an extension befitting a Victorian gentleman. The instruction was to incorporate some of the existing structure built in 1856 and 1874. Unlike other homesteads built in Christchurch in the 1890s, the design for Riccarton House was restrained. This was in keeping with Deans' conservative style, his Presbyterian upbringing, but possibly also a reflection that he was in some economic difficulty. The extension was built on the west side of the existing house. The extension more than doubled the size of the house. There were now eleven bedrooms upstairs. The name of the builder is not known. There is extensive oak panelling downstairs, cut from a tree grown on the property. The newel posts of the main staircase are capped with carved acorns to show the provenance of the timber. It is believed that the oak was from a tree given to the Deans brothers in 1849 by Governor George Grey. The house was also fitted with electric lighting, with the power generated by the water wheel installed on the property in 1853. The extension took 18 months to build and was completed in late 1900.

The September 2010 Canterbury earthquake caused damage to six of the seven chimneys, with a brick falling through the ceiling into what used to be Jane Deans' bedroom. The chimneys were removed down to the ceiling level of the ground floor. This prevented major damage in the subsequent February 2011 Christchurch earthquake; many other heritage buildings in Christchurch were badly damaged by collapsing chimneys. The house was not too badly damaged by the earthquakes. The problem was that the subsequent engineering assessment revealed that it fell below the 34 percent threshold of required seismic strength, with parts of the building as low as 10 percent, and it was thus necessary to upgrade the building to at least 67 percent of the new building code. As this required invasive work, the trust opted to have other major work carried out at the same time. All wiring was renewed, insulation was installed plus a heat pump, automatic fire doors plus a modern fire alarm were fitted, and the commercial kitchen for the building's restaurant was renewed. In total, NZ$2.3 million was spent on the upgrade and repair. John Radburn, a heritage specialist, was appointed by Christchurch City Council as the project manager of its 65 damaged heritage buildings. He worked closely with the insurance loss adjuster and oversaw the project. The heritage architect on the project was Tony Ussher and Simon Construction was appointed as builder. Work started in early 2013 and was completed after 18 months.

== Ownership ==
The Deans family owned the house and grounds until 1947 when the property was sold to Christchurch City Council. Since then, the property has been administered by the Riccarton Bush Board of Trustees. The adjacent Riccarton Bush had been gifted to the public, with governance outlined in the Riccarton Bush Act 1914. The 1947 purchase required an amendment of this act, passed by Parliament as the Riccarton Bush Amendment Act 1947.

== Heritage registration ==
On 25 June 1992, Riccarton House was registered by the New Zealand Historic Places Trust (now Heritage New Zealand) as a Category I historic building. The Christchurch suburb of Riccarton is named after the Riccarton homestead.

== See also ==
- List of oldest buildings in Christchurch
