= Riccarton, New Zealand =

Suburb of Christchurch, New Zealand

Riccarton
- Suburb
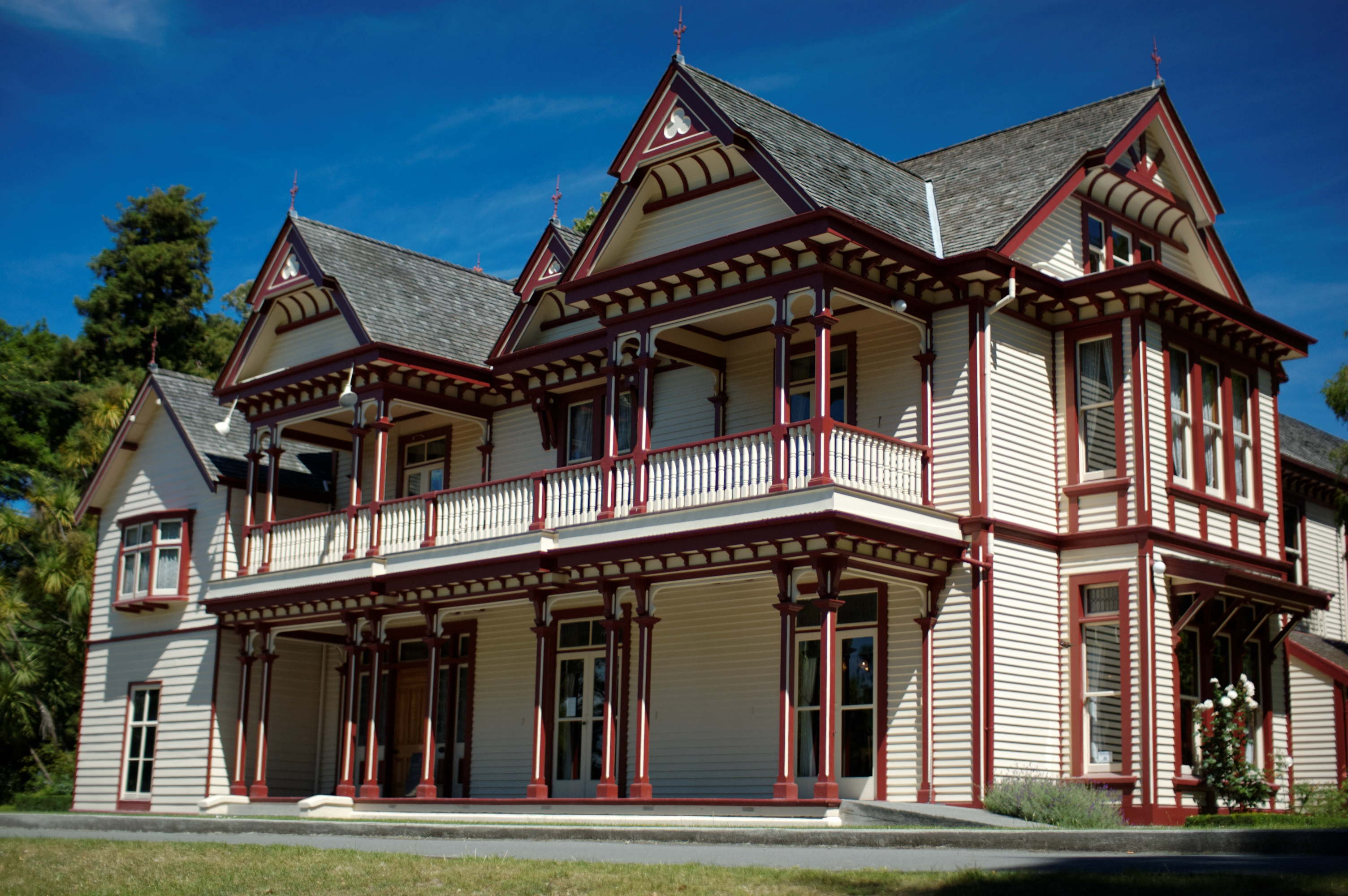
- Riccarton House, a prominent homestead and the suburb's namesake, in 2008
- Interactive map of Riccarton
- Coordinates: 43.52998°S 172.59744°E
- Country: New Zealand
- City: Christchurch
- Electoral ward: Riccarton; Fendalton
- Community board: Waimāero Fendalton-Waimairi-Harewood; Waipuna Halswell-Hornby-Riccarton
- Established: 1840

Area
  - Land: 232 ha (570 acres)

Population (June 2025)
  - Total: 11,200
  - Density: 4,830/km^{2} (12,500/sq mi)
- Postcode: 8041

Ilam	Fendalton
Upper Riccarton	Riccarton	(Hagley Park)
Wigram	Addington

Riccarton is a suburb of Christchurch. It is due west of the city centre, separated from it by Hagley Park. Upper Riccarton is to the west of Riccarton.

== History ==
On 12 April 1840, the ship Sarah and Elizabeth landed Herriot, McGillivray, Ellis, Shaw (and wife) and McKinnon (with his wife and child) who established a farm at Riccarton. They were the first European settlers on the plains." In January 1841, they abandoned their attempt to farm in the area.

Riccarton House was the homestead commissioned by Jane Deans in circa 1855. The Deans brothers, who along with the Gebbies and the Mansons were the second group of Europeans to settle in Christchurch on the same site as the first group in 1843. Their original cottage is on the grounds, moved twice from its original position. Riccarton House is now a restaurant and function centre, and conducts regular tours. The Deans brothers, John and William, named the suburb after the parish in Ayrshire, Scotland, in which they were born. They were also responsible for naming the River Avon after the river of the same name in Lanarkshire, Scotland.

Antonio Hall is located on Riccarton Road. A large property with 279 rooms and once described as "one of the finest in Christchurch and vicinity", it has been left to decay despite a Category II listing with Heritage New Zealand. In July 2019, 30% of the building was lost to a fire started by a 14 year old youth.

The Al Noor Mosque on Deans Avenue was the site of a mass shooting during the Christchurch mosque shootings on 15 March 2019.

== Riccarton Bush ==
Adjacent to Riccarton House is Riccarton Bush, a prominent feature also known as Deans Bush (Māori: Pūtaringamotu). The Māori word Pūtaringamotu means either 'the place of an echo' or 'the severed ear'. The latter is a metaphoric expression referring to 'bush isolated from the rest'. It is one of only four remnants of the original forest that covered the Canterbury plains, escaping the huge fires that swept across the province during the moa hunter period. Another remnant, at Papanui, was cut down in the 1850s. The other two remnants were at Kaiapoi and Rangiora. It is dominated by kahikatea trees. A predator-proof perimeter fence has now been erected, with the hope of reintroducing kiwi to the reserve. In 1848, Scots brothers John and William Deans signed an agreement with the New Zealand Company to protect what was originally about 22 hectares of the kahikatea forest at Pūtaringamotu. In 1914, the 6.4 hectares that remained of Deans Bush was formally protected, with the passing of the Riccarton Bush Act 1914, spearheaded by prominent citizens of Christchurch, including Harry Ell and botanist Dr. Leonard Cockayne.

Riccarton Bush has played an important role in the history of New Zealand entomology. A number of native insects were first collected and named from Riccarton Bush. One of the first collections was of a plume moth Pterophorus monospilalis in 1859 which is now in the Fereday collection held in the Canterbury Museum. Thirty nine families of Lepidoptera are found in New Zealand; 27 of these occur in Riccarton Bush. The moths of Riccarton Bush represent the majority of these families. The bag moth Mallobathra metrosema is only known to occur in Riccarton Bush.

== Riccarton Racecourse Hotel ==
The Riccarton Racecourse Hotel is considered to be one of the most haunted places in New Zealand. It is said that the ghost of former licensee Donald Fraser walks the corridors of the hotel looking for his killer. In 1933, Fraser was murdered in the dead of night in his bedroom, where his wife was sleeping, by two blasts from a double-barrelled shotgun. Despite investigations, nobody was found guilty of the crime.

== Governance ==
Until local government amalgamation in 1989, Riccarton was an independent borough. Since then, Riccarton is represented by the Halswell-Hornby-Riccarton community board. In the 2018 local government elections, Catherine Chu was elected as Councillor for the Riccarton ward. In the following local government election held in October 2022, she was replaced by speaker, consultant, and basketball coach Tyla Harrison-Hunt.

== Economy ==
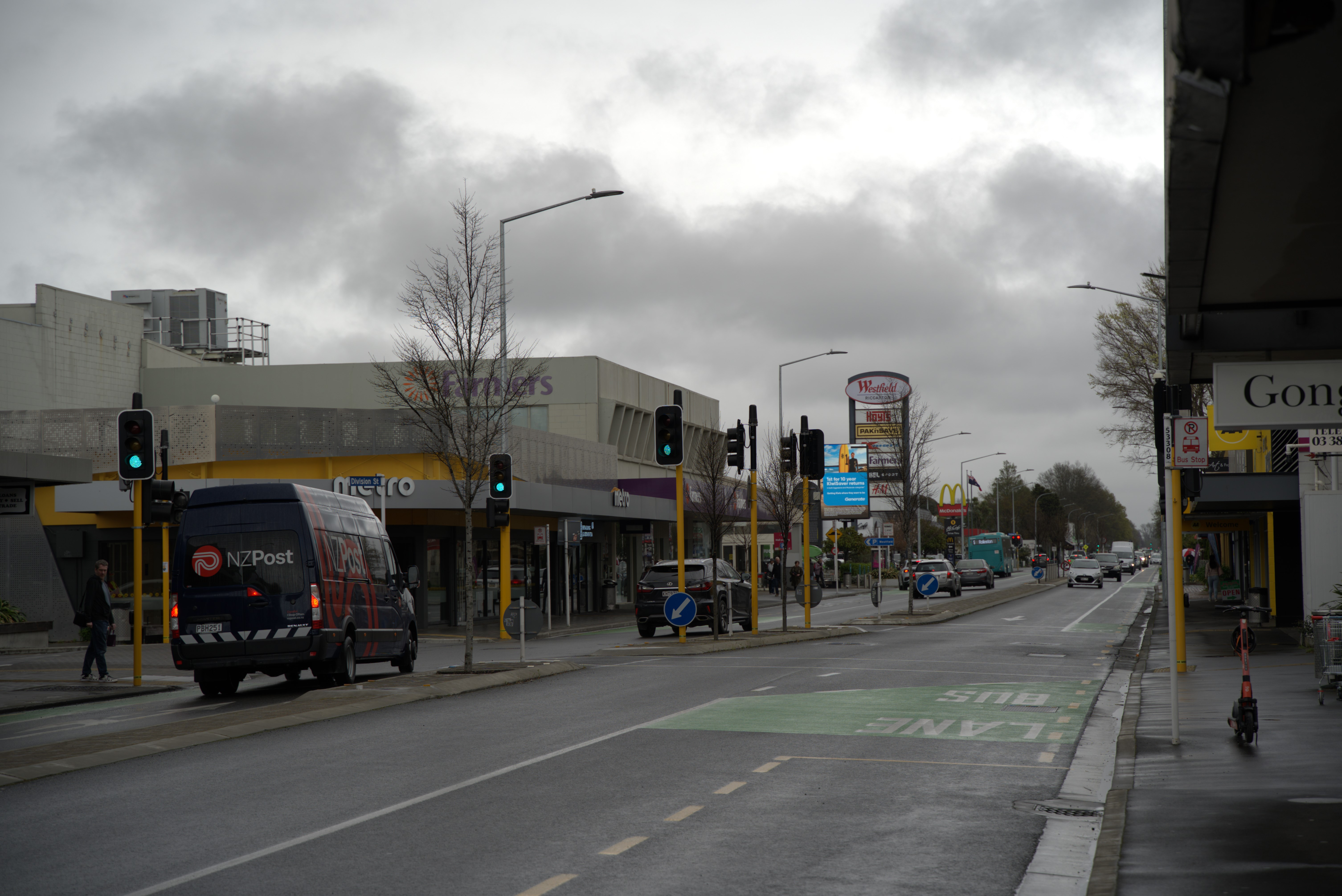
Riccarton Road

Riccarton is home to Westfield Riccarton, which at approximately 54,000 square metres (580,000 ft^{2}) is one of New Zealand's largest shopping malls. The mall was first opened as Riccarton Mall on 3 November 1965, and has since undergone multiple redevelopments and expansions. The most recent of these took place in 2009, with the addition of a second floor and new carpark building, while plans for further expansions into neighbouring property are within the design process. This development underpins much of the economic activity in Riccarton, with the nearby stretch of Riccarton Road also a busy retail area with numerous motels.

== Population ==
Riccarton is divided into five statistical areas by Statistics New Zealand. Four of these are primarily residential, and Riccarton Central is the commercial area.

Individual statistical areas
Name	Area (km^{2})	Population	Density (per km^{2})	Dwellings	Median age	Median income
Mona Vale	0.55	1,602	2,913	606	35.1 years	$43,900
Riccarton West	0.62	3,675	5,927	1,110	24.0 years	$23,800
Riccarton South	0.54	3,555	6,583	1,314	29.7 years	$33,200
Riccarton East	0.21	1,107	5,271	429	32.3 years	$41,600
Riccarton Central	0.40	54	135	18	41.7 years	$37,400
New Zealand					38.1 years	$41,500

=== Residential areas ===
The residential areas of Riccarton cover 1.92 km^{2} (0.74 sq mi). It had an estimated population of 11,120 as of June 2025, with a population density of 5,792 people per km^{2}.

Historical population for residential areas
Year	Pop.	±% p.a.
2006	7,860	—
2013	8,319	+0.81%
2018	9,198	+2.03%
2023	9,939	+1.56%

The residential areas, comprising the statistical areas of Mona Vale, Riccarton West, Riccarton South and Riccarton East, had a population of 9,939 in the 2023 New Zealand census, an increase of 741 people (8.1%) since the 2018 census, and an increase of 1,620 people (19.5%) since the 2013 census. There were 4,986 males, 4,869 females, and 84 people of other genders in 3,459 dwellings. 6.9% of people identified as LGBTIQ+. There were 1,287 people (12.9%) aged under 15 years, 3,921 (39.5%) aged 15 to 29, 3,858 (38.8%) aged 30 to 64, and 873 (8.8%) aged 65 or older.

People could identify as more than one ethnicity. The results were 53.3% European (Pākehā); 9.2% Māori; 3.8% Pasifika; 38.6% Asian; 4.2% Middle Eastern, Latin American and African New Zealanders (MELAA); and 1.7% other, which includes people giving their ethnicity as "New Zealander". English was spoken by 93.5%, Māori by 1.8%, Samoan by 1.0%, and other languages by 30.0%. No language could be spoken by 1.9% (e.g. too young to talk). New Zealand Sign Language was known by 0.5%. The percentage of people born overseas was 45.8, compared with 28.8% nationally.

Religious affiliations were 32.3% Christian, 5.3% Hindu, 4.0% Islam, 0.3% Māori religious beliefs, 2.1% Buddhist, 0.4% New Age, 0.1% Jewish, and 3.1% other religions. People who answered that they had no religion were 47.1%, and 5.3% of people did not answer the census question.

Places of worship cover a variety of faiths, including Christian churches, the Yolin Assemblies of God Korean Church, the Fo Guang Shan Buddhist temple, a Sikh temple on Kilmarnock St, and the Al Noor Mosque.

Of those at least 15 years old, 2,571 (29.7%) people had a bachelor's or higher degree, 3,957 (45.7%) had a post-high school certificate or diploma, and 2,121 (24.5%) people exclusively held high school qualifications. 492 people (5.7%) earned over $100,000 compared to 12.1% nationally. The employment status of those at least 15 was 3,996 (46.2%) full-time, 1,554 (18.0%) part-time, and 342 (4.0%) unemployed.

=== Riccarton Central ===
Riccarton Central includes Westfield Riccarton and the commercial area along Mandeville Street. It covers 0.40 km^{2} (0.15 sq mi) and had an estimated population of 80 as of June 2025, with a population density of 200 people per km^{2}.

Historical population for Riccarton Central
Year	Pop.	±% p.a.
2006	30	—
2013	21	−4.97%
2018	51	+19.42%
2023	54	+1.15%

Riccarton Central had a population of 54 in the 2023 New Zealand census, an increase of 3 people (5.9%) since the 2018 census, and an increase of 33 people (157.1%) since the 2013 census. There were 27 males and 27 females in 18 dwellings. 5.6% of people identified as LGBTIQ+. The median age was 41.7 years (compared with 38.1 years nationally). There were 3 people (5.6%) aged under 15 years, 9 (16.7%) aged 15 to 29, 33 (61.1%) aged 30 to 64, and 9 (16.7%) aged 65 or older.

People could identify as more than one ethnicity. The results were 44.4% European (Pākehā), 5.6% Māori, 5.6% Pasifika, and 61.1% Asian. English was spoken by 88.9%, Māori by 5.6%, and other languages by 55.6%. The percentage of people born overseas was 66.7, compared with 28.8% nationally.

Religious affiliations were 27.8% Christian, 5.6% Hindu, 5.6% Islam, 16.7% Buddhist, and 5.6% New Age. People who answered that they had no religion were 44.4%.

Of those at least 15 years old, 21 (41.2%) people had a bachelor's or higher degree, 18 (35.3%) had a post-high school certificate or diploma, and 12 (23.5%) people exclusively held high school qualifications. The median income was $37,400, compared with $41,500 nationally. The employment status of those at least 15 was 33 (64.7%) full-time and 6 (11.8%) part-time.

== Education ==
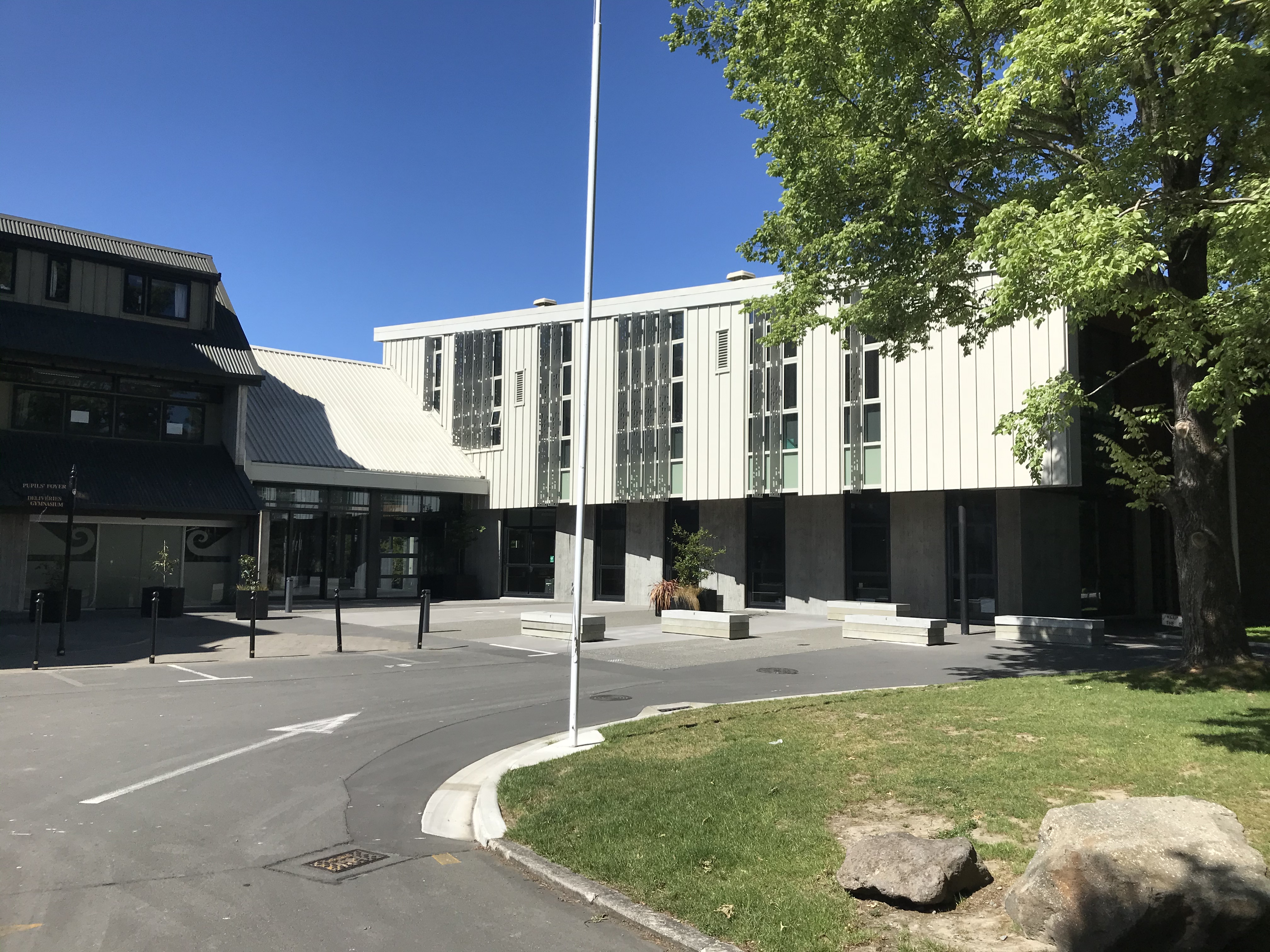
Christchurch Girls' High school in 2020

Christchurch Girls' High School is a girls' secondary school for years 9 to 13, with a roll of 1,299 students. It opened in 1877.

Wharenui School is a full primary school for students in years 1 to 8. It has a roll of 411. The school opened in 1907.

St Teresa's School is a Catholic full primary school for years 1 to 8. It has a roll of 171. It opened in 1936.

Rolls are as of July 2026.

== Notable residents ==
- Charlotte Godley
- Vicki Buck
- John Britten
- Kate Dewes
- Octavius Mathias

== See also ==
- Riccarton Park Racecourse
- Riccarton Racecourse Siding
