= 1938 Christchurch mayoral election =

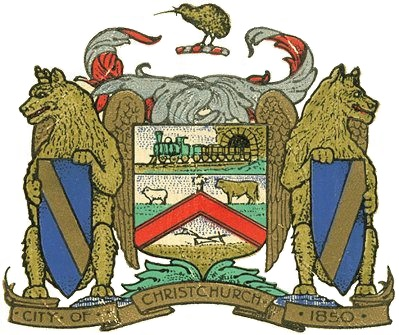
- 11 May 1938
- Turnout: 36,116
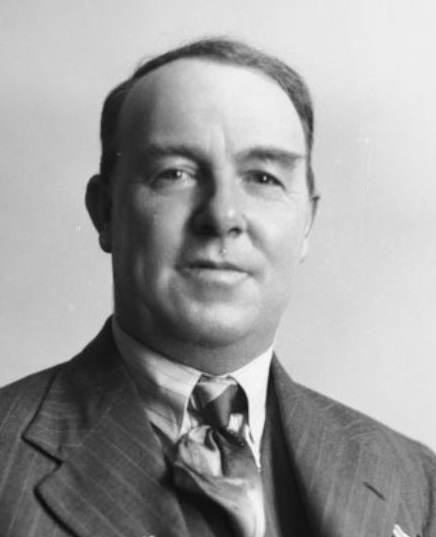

| Candidate | Robert Macfarlane | John Guthrie |
| Party | Labour | Citizens' |
| Popular vote | 18,698 | 17,418 |
| Percentage | 51.77 | 48.23 |
Mayor before election
John Beanland
Citizens'
Elected mayor
Robert Macfarlane
Labour

The 1938 Christchurch City mayoral election was held on 11 May. The incumbent, John Beanland of the Citizens' Association, failed to get the nomination by his party and the surgeon Dr. John Guthrie was nominated instead. The Labour Party nominated Robert Macfarlane. Both the Labour and conservative candidate had been members of Christchurch City Council for some years. Macfarlane narrowly won the mayoralty.

== Background ==
The 1935 Christchurch mayoral election had been won by Dan Sullivan of the Labour Party; he had been mayor since 1931. The Labour Party subsequently won the November 1935 general election and Sullivan was appointed cabinet minister. Sullivan reluctantly resigned from the mayoralty in February 1936, as the heavy workload of a cabinet minister was incompatible with remaining mayor. The resulting by-election in March 1936 was won by building contractor John Beanland of the Citizens' Association. His main challenger had been Rev John Archer, who had previously been mayor from 1925 until 1931. An independent Labour candidate, Edward Leslie Hills, received less than 2% of the vote in that by-election.

== Candidates ==
=== John Guthrie ===
On 18 March 1938, the Citizens' Association held its nomination meeting. Dr. John Guthrie was chosen in favour of the incumbent mayor, John Beanland, who accepted nomination to the city council instead. Guthrie was born in Akaroa in 1877 as the son of a surgeon, also named John Guthrie. He received his education in Christchurch, first at Cathedral Grammar School, then at Christchurch Boys' High School, followed by Canterbury University College. Guthrie junior completed his medical education at the University of Glasgow where his father had also trained.

Guthrie Jr was a captain with the Royal New Zealand Army Medical Corps in 1918/19 during World War I. Prior to the war, he had a general practice in Lyttelton from 1907 and was honorary surgeon at Christchurch Hospital from 1915. Since the war, he was a consulting surgeon in Christchurch. Guthrie had previously been on the Lyttelton Borough Council and had won election to Christchurch City Council in 1935. Guthrie was a member of the Canterbury College Council. In the arts, he was involved with the Canterbury Society of Arts and the Royal Christchurch Musical Society (now known as the Christchurch City Choir). He played tennis and golf and was at one point president of the United Tennis Club (now known as the Hagley Park Tennis Club).

=== Robert Macfarlane ===
The Labour Party went through a lengthy nomination process. At the end of January 1938, it was revealed that various organisations affiliated to Labour had put forward six potential candidates: Rev John Archer, John Septimus Barnett, Terry McCombs, Robert Macfarlane, George Manning, and John Mathison. Of those, Macfarlane, Barnett, and McCombs contested the Labour Party selection, where Macfarlane was chosen by secret ballot. At the same meeting, candidates for six Christchurch general electorates were confirmed, with Macfarlane chosen to contest the Christchurch North electorate in the 1938 general election.

Macfarlane was born in Christchurch in 1900. Raised by his grandmother, he attended Waltham School and may have had two years of high school. He worked in various labour job. In 1918, he joined the Christchurch Socialist Party and became its president shortly after. In 1919, he joined the Christchurch South branch of the Labour Party. When the Christchurch East branch of the Labour Party was founding in 1922, Macfarlane became its inaugural secretary. In 1925, he became secretary of the North Canterbury Labour Representation Committee; a role he still held in 1938. He was first elected onto Christchurch City Council in 1927 but failed to get re-elected in 1929. In the 1935 general election, he stood in the Christchurch North electorate and got narrowly beaten by Sidney Holland. He regained a seat on Christchurch City Council in a by-election in 1936.

== Results ==
The election was held on Wednesday, 11 May 1938, from 9am to 7pm. The first-past-the-post voting system was used. There were 18 polling booths in Christchurch Central, 19 polling booths across Linwood and Woolston, 23 polling booths across St Albans and Papanui, 33 polling booths across Sydenham and Spreydon, and 1 polling booth in Lyttelton; a total of 94 booths. Macfarlane won the mayoral election over Guthrie.

There were four different bodies elected that day. Apart from the mayoralty people voted for 16 city councillors (33 candidates), 9 hospital board representatives (18 candidates), and 4 Lyttelton Harbour Board representatives (8 candidates). On the city council, the Citizens' Association had held a majority (11 of 16 seats) but this was reversed by the Labour Party, which won 10 of the seats.

=== Mayoral election results ===
1938 Christchurch mayoral election
| Party | Candidate | Votes | % | ±% |
|---|---|---|---|---|
| Labour | Robert Macfarlane | 18,698 | 51.77 | |
| Citizens' | John Guthrie | 17,418 | 48.23 | |
| Majority | | 1,280 | 3.54 | |
| Turnout | | 36,116 | | |

=== City councillor election results ===
1938 Christchurch City Council election
| Party | Candidate | Votes | % | ±% |
|---|---|---|---|---|
| Labour | Jack Barnett | 20,762 | 57.48 | +13.92 |
| Labour | George Manning | 20,421 | 56.54 | +7.86 |
| Labour | Edward Parlane | 20,263 | 56.10 | +11.29 |
| Citizens' | Hugh Acland | 18,471 | 51.14 | −1.05 |
| Labour | Harold Denton | 18,350 | 50.80 | +16.22 |
| Labour | Mabel Howard | 18,212 | 50.42 | +10.56 |
| Labour | John David Carey | 17,667 | 48.91 | +14.69 |
| Labour | Thomas Nuttall | 17,614 | 48.77 | |
| Labour | John Edward Jones | 17,177 | 47.56 | |
| Citizens' | Ernest Andrews | 16,895 | 46.77 | −2.74 |
| Labour | Ernest Alan Sharp | 16,861 | 46.68 | |
| Citizens' | Alfred Charles Sandston | 16,773 | 46.44 | −1.96 |
| Citizens' | Melville Lyons | 16,411 | 45.43 | −5.60 |
| Citizens' | Thomas Milliken | 16,404 | 45.42 | +1.35 |
| Citizens' | John Beanland | 16,248 | 44.99 | −8.88 |
| Labour | Frank George Thomas | 16,246 | 44.98 | |
| Labour | Reg Jones | 16,245 | 44.97 | |
| Labour | Harold Ernest Fenton | 16,200 | 44.85 | |
| Labour | Frederick Michael Robson | 15,920 | 44.08 | |
| Citizens' | Frank Driessen Sargent | 15,694 | 43.45 | +0.77 |
| Citizens' | Bill MacGibbon | 15,486 | 42.87 | −0.43 |
| Labour | Arthur Henry Scales | 15,480 | 42.86 | |
| Labour | William Patrick Hickey | 15,445 | 42.76 | +14.32 |
| Labour | Frederick Kelso | 15,418 | 42.69 | |
| Citizens' | William Hayward | 15,400 | 42.64 | −2.46 |
| Citizens' | Frank Sturmer Wilding | 15,310 | 42.39 | |
| Citizens' | Henry Frederick Herbert | 15,001 | 41.53 | |
| Citizens' | Thomas Andrews | 14,998 | 41.52 | −4.55 |
| Citizens' | George Daniel Simpson | 14,432 | 39.96 | |
| Citizens' | Herbert Clarence Hurst | 14,312 | 39.62 | |
| Citizens' | William Scholes Grigg | 13,438 | 37.20 | |
| Citizens' | Frederick Laws | 12,364 | 34.23 | |
| Independent | Berthold Ahlfeld | 3,284 | 9.09 | +4.49 |

== Aftermath ==
Macfarlane served a three-year term as mayor and did not stand for re-election as he wanted to serve in World War II. During his mayoralty, he unsuccessfully stood in the 1938 general election but was successful in a 1939 by-election, when he succeeded Ted Howard. Guthrie did not contest further elections but became the president of the local branch of the New Zealand National Party. Guthrie died in 1942. Macfarlane served a further eight years as mayor from 1950 to 1958.
