= 1935 Christchurch mayoral election =

New Zealand mayoral election

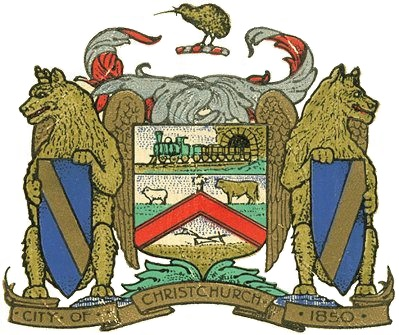
- 8 May 1935
- Turnout: 39,803
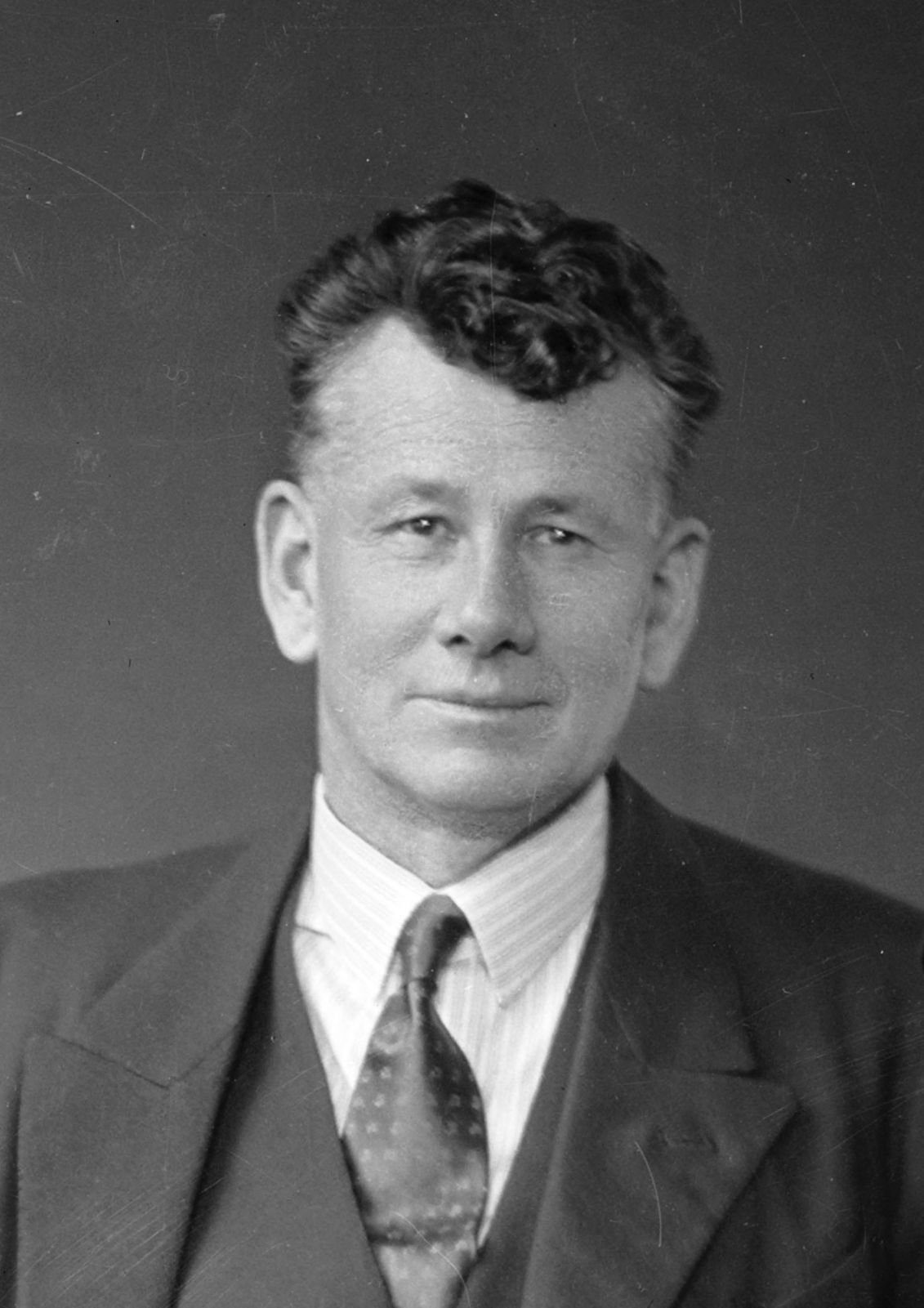

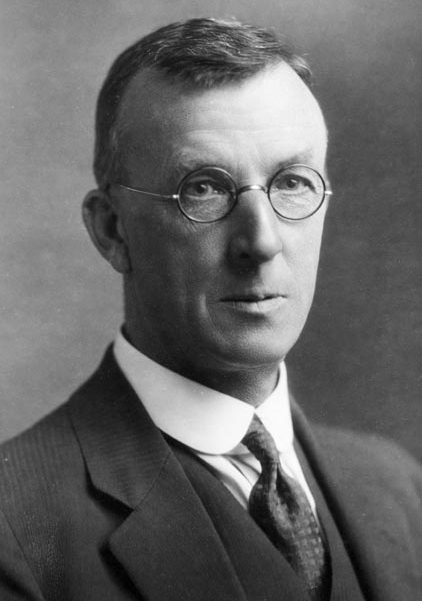
Candidate	Dan Sullivan	Hugh Acland
Party	Labour	Citizens'
Popular vote	20,066	19,737
Percentage	50.41	49.59
Mayor before election
Dan Sullivan
Elected mayor
Dan Sullivan

The 1935 Christchurch City mayoral election was held on 8 May. The incumbent, Dan Sullivan of the Labour Party narrowly beat the conservative candidate, Hugh Acland, a surgeon and World War I veteran. The election attracted nationwide attention, as Christchurch was a Labour-stronghold and due to Acland's widespread popularity, it was regarded as a test whether Labour could potentially win the November 1935 general election.

== Background ==
In 1935, the voting system returned to the initially used first-past-the-post after a ranked voting system had been tried for some years. The country experienced the Great Depression at the time, with high unemployment. Sullivan had been the city's mayor since 1931, when he beat William Hayward.

== Candidates ==
=== Dan Sullivan ===
Dan Sullivan was first elected to Christchurch City Council in 1915. He had first stood for the House of Representatives in the 1908 election and in 1919, he decisively beat the Minister of Public Health, George Warren Russell, in the wake of the 1918 flu epidemic. Since then, Sullivan had been representing the Avon electorate. Sullivan stood for mayor in 1923 but was beaten by James Arthur Flesher. A Labour Party politician, he was regarded as a moderate.

=== Hugh Acland ===
Sir Hugh Acland was from a prominent Canterbury family. The youngest of John Acland's 11 children, he was a grandson of Christchurch's first bishop, Henry Harper. John Acland was a member of the Legislative Council for a third of a century. Just prior to the election, the engagement of his son Jack was announced to Kit Ormond; her family was equally prominent in New Zealand, and her grandfather, John Davies Ormond, had been Superintendent of Hawke's Bay Province. Hugh Acland was a prominent surgeon who served with the New Zealand Medical Corps during World War I. Acland was knighted in the 1933 Birthday Honours for services to medicine. Acland stood in the election for the conservative Citizens' Association.

== Campaign ==
Sullivan's selection for the 1935 mayoralty election was announced on 1 February. John Beanland and Ernest Andrews were rumoured as possible candidates for the Citizens' Association, but Acland's candidacy was announced on 25 February.

== Results ==
Sullivan beat Acland by a small margin, with the election resulting in a record turnout. There were significant differences between the preliminary results released on the evening of the election, and the final results three days later.

Christchurch mayoral election, 1935
Party	Candidate	Votes	%	±%
Labour	Dan Sullivan	20,066	50.41	
Citizens'	Hugh Acland	19,737	49.59	
Majority		329	0.83	
Turnout		39,803		

== Council results ==
1935 Christchurch City Council election
Party	Candidate	Votes	%	±%
Citizens'	John Beanland	21,444	53.87	
Citizens'	Melville Lyons	20,312	51.03	
Citizens'	Ernest Andrews	19,708	49.51	
Citizens'	John Guthrie	19,478	48.93	
Citizens'	Charles Edward Jones	19,463	48.89	
Citizens'	Alfred Charles Sandston	19,265	48.40	
Citizens'	Thomas Andrews	18,340	46.07	
Citizens'	William Hayward	17,954	45.10	
Labour	Edward Parlane	17,838	44.81	
Labour	John Archer	17,718	44.51	
Citizens'	Thomas Milliken	17,545	44.07	
Labour	Thomas Henry Butterfield	17,432	43.79	
Labour	Jack Barnett	17,339	43.56	
Citizens'	Bill MacGibbon	17,238	43.30	
Citizens'	Arthur Graham Jamieson	17,147	43.07	
Citizens'	Frank Driessen Sargent	16,991	42.68	
Citizens'	James Maling	16,949	42.58	
Labour	George Manning	16,777	42.15	
Labour	George Thomas Thurston	16,198	40.69	
Citizens'	James Seymour Middleton	16,007	40.21	
Labour	Mabel Howard	15,867	39.86	
Labour	Robert Macfarlane	15,688	39.41	
Labour	John Mathison	15,342	38.54	
Citizens'	James Carter	15,181	38.14	
Labour	Isabella Parlane	15,050	37.81	
Citizens'	John Gordon Leslie Vernon	15,009	37.70	
Labour	Harold Denton	13,764	34.58	
Labour	John David Carey	13,624	34.22	
Labour	Joseph William Roberts	12,878	32.35	
Labour	Arthur Edwin Tongue	12,582	31.61	
Labour	William Patrick Hickey	11,323	28.44	
Labour	Alfred John Beauchamp	11,298	28.38	
Independent Labour	Tommy Armstrong	11,169	28.06	
Independent	Henry Thacker	8,919	22.40	
Independent	Lancelot Charles Walker	6,849	17.20	
Independent	Charles Seymour Trillo	4,417	11.09	
Independent	George Thomas Baker	3,840	9.64	
Independent Labour	Charles Henry Cole	3,452	8.67	
Independent Labour	Edward Leslie Hills	3,395	8.52	
Independent Labour	Jack Selwyn Edwin Wiggs	2,873	7.21	
Independent	James Sturrock	1,713	4.30	
Socialist	William Henry Bayard	1,624	4.08	
Socialist	Herbert Henry Dunkley	1,615	4.05	
Communist	Alexandrina Penny	1,204	3.02	

== Aftermath ==
The Labour Party won the November 1935 general election and Sullivan was appointed cabinet minister. Sullivan reluctantly resigned from the mayoralty in February 1936, as the heavy workload of a cabinet minister was incompatible with remaining mayor. The resulting by-election on 11 March 1936 was narrowly won by the deputy-mayor, John Beanland, who represented the Citizens' Association. Beanland beat Labour's candidate, John Archer who had previously been mayor from 1925 to 1931.
