= 1933 Christchurch mayoral election =

New Zealand local election

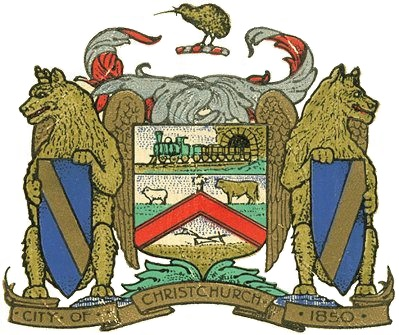
- 3 May 1933
- Turnout: 29,249
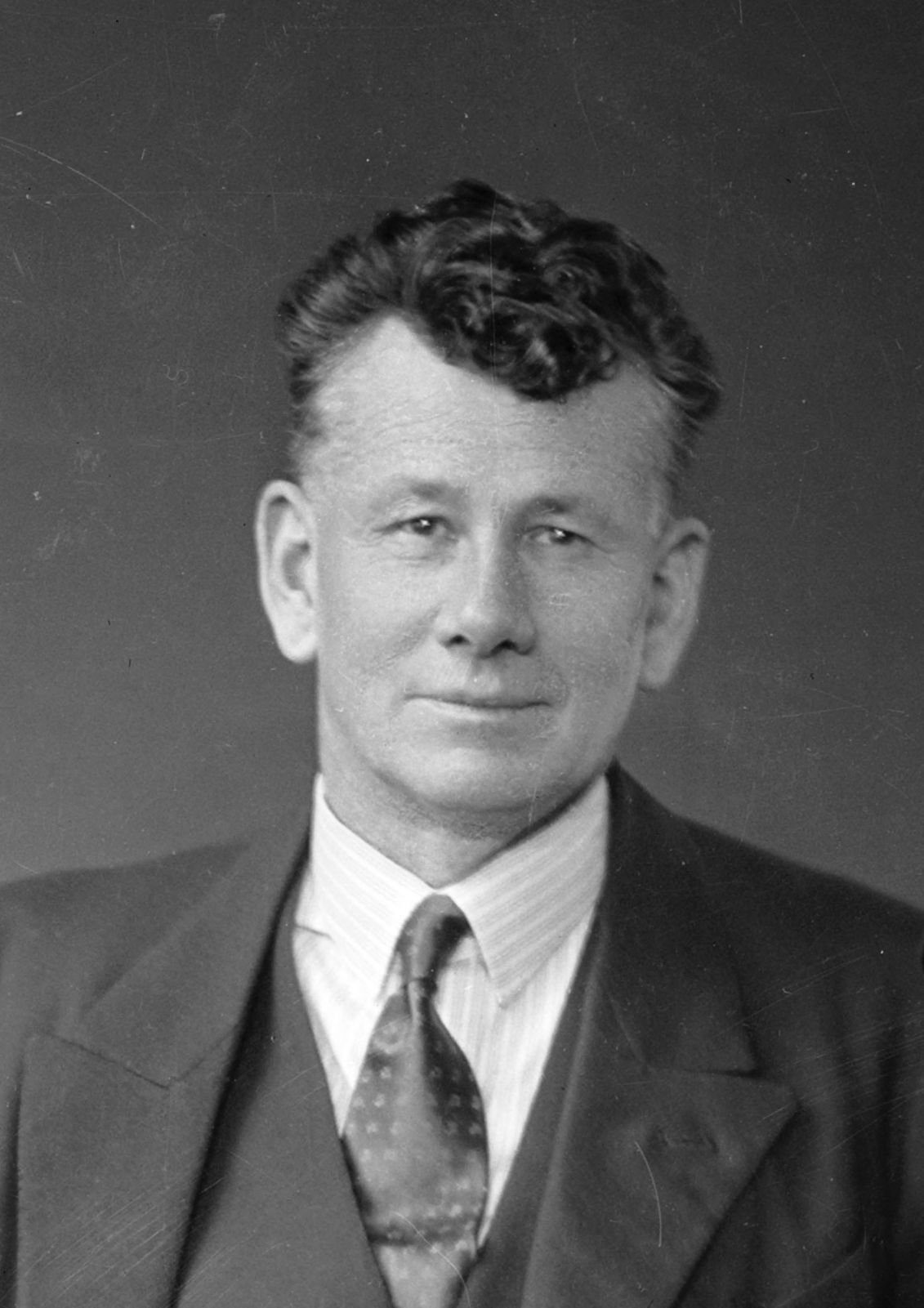

Candidate	Dan Sullivan	Lancelot Walker
Party	Labour	Independent
Popular vote	18,345	10,389
Percentage	62.72	35.51
Mayor before election
Dan Sullivan
Elected mayor
Dan Sullivan

The 1933 Christchurch mayoral election was part of the New Zealand local elections held that same year. In 1933, election were held for the Mayor of Christchurch plus 16 councillors and other local government positions.

== Background ==
Sitting mayor Dan Sullivan sought re-election for a second term. The Citizens' Association, whose leaders had cooperated well with Sullivan during the term, decided not to put up an opposing candidate "... the Citizens' Association's leading councillors declined to stand against Sullivan and only a somewhat eccentric Independent, Lancelot Walker, opposed him. Walker favoured some grandiose schemes and Sullivan appeared safely conservative in comparison."

== Mayoral results ==
The following table gives the election results:

1933 Christchurch mayoral election
Party	Candidate	Votes	%	±%
Labour	Dan Sullivan	18,345	62.72	
Independent	Lancelot Charles Walker	10,389	35.51	
Informal votes		515	1.76	
Majority		7,956	27.20	
Turnout		29,249		

== Council results ==
The following table gives the overall party strengths and vote distribution.

Election results by Party
Party	Candidates	Total votes	Percentage	Averages	Seats won
Labour	13	12,235	43.73	874	7
Citizens'	12	10,510	37.57	876	6
Independent	9	3,225	11.52	358	2
Socialist	5	1,778	6.35	356	1
Communist	3	117	0.41	39	0

The following table gives the initial candidate preferences totals and sorted by the vote distribution after the 720th (final) count.

1933 Christchurch City Council election
Party	Candidate	Votes	%	±%
Labour	John Archer	5,494	19.63	
Citizens'	Ernest Andrews	2,416	8.63	
Citizens'	John Beanland	2,235	7.98	
Labour	Elizabeth McCombs	2,171	7.76	
Independent	Francis Thomas Evans	1,763	6.30	
Socialist	Tommy Armstrong	1,549	5.53	
Labour	Jack Barnett	389	1.39	
Labour	Mabel Howard	845	3.02	
Citizens'	Melville Lyons	1,098	3.92	
Citizens'	William Hayward	1,071	3.82	
Citizens'	Thomas Milliken	1,009	3.60	
Labour	John Mathison	988	3.53	
Labour	Thomas Henry Butterfield	373	1.33	
Labour	George Thomas Thurston	377	1.34	
Citizens'	Thomas Andrews	396	1.41	
Independent	Henry Thacker	586	2.09	
Citizens'	Annie Fraer	1,351	4.82	
Labour	Edward Parlane	1,087	3.88	
Citizens'	Bill MacGibbon	942	3.36	
Citizens'	John Nicholas De Feu	845	3.02	
Independent	George Thomas Baker	630	2.25	
Citizens'	Richard John Bickerton Dalley	576	2.05	
Labour	Arthur Edwin Tongue	571	2.04	
Labour	Robert Macfarlane	445	1.59	
Citizens'	Kathleen Moore	320	1.14	
Labour	Alfred John Beauchamp	303	1.08	
Labour	Reg Stillwell	281	1.00	
Independent	William James Boyce	260	0.92	
Citizens'	John James Hurley	226	0.80	
Socialist	William Berryman	198	0.70	
Independent	Charles Seymour Trillo	140	0.50	
Independent	Silas McAlister	132	0.47	
Socialist	William Henry Bayard	130	0.46	
Labour	Joseph William Roberts	118	0.42	
Communist	Robert Macdonald	101	0.36	
Socialist	Ferguson Hamilton Grant	75	0.26	
Independent	Edwin Philpott Crowther	56	0.20	
Independent	Charles John McKay	52	0.18	
Communist	Richard Henry Ellis	45	0.16	
Independent	Philip Richard Needham	29	0.10	
Socialist	Leonard Frank Warburton	26	0.09	
Communist	Albert John Patterson	15	0.05	
