= 1936 Christchurch mayoral by-election =

Local election in New Zealand

Christchurch mayoral by-election, 1936
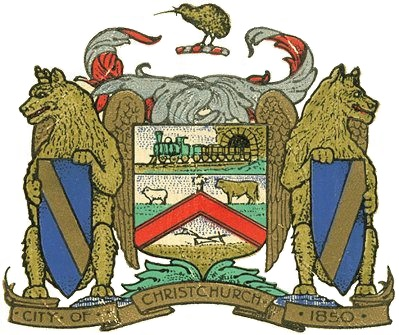
- 11 March 1936
- Turnout: 30,167
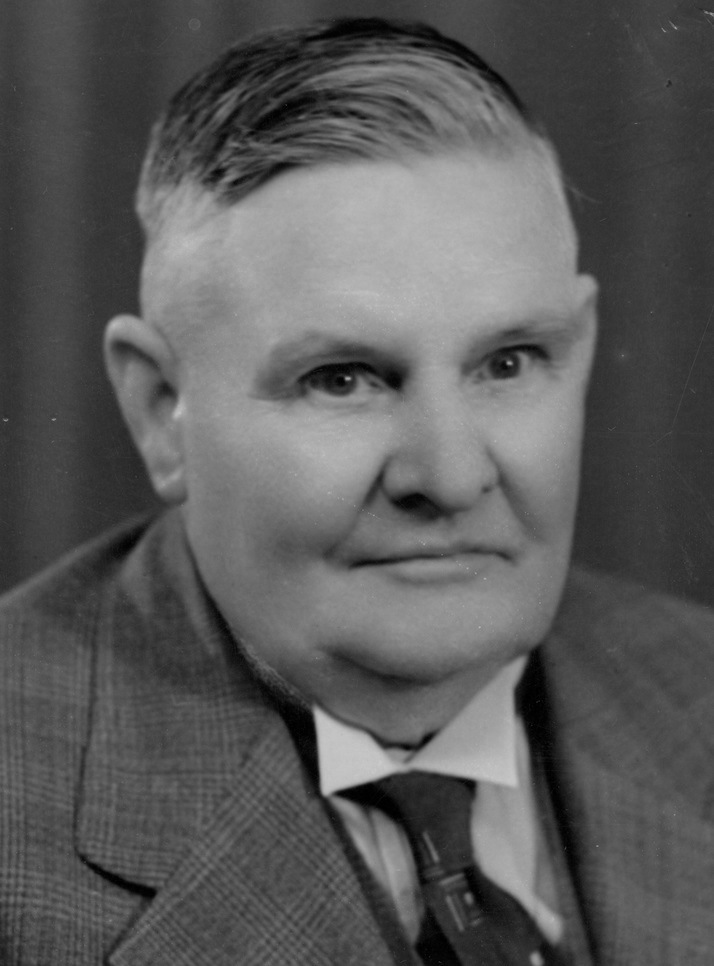

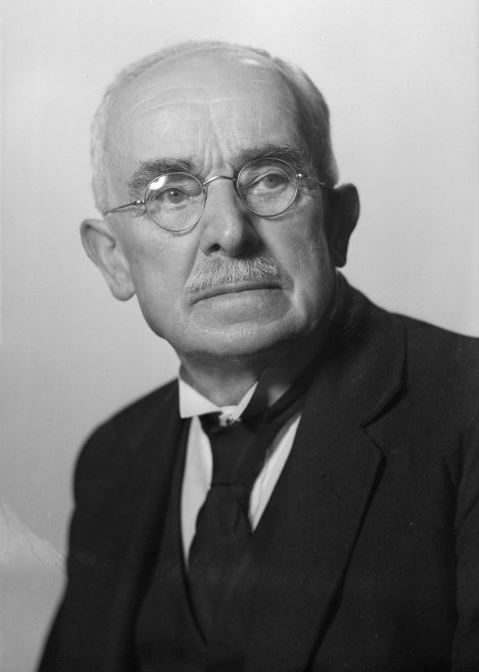
Candidate	John Beanland	John Archer
Party	Citizens'	Labour
Popular vote	15,141	14,310
Percentage	50.60	47.82
Mayor before election
Dan Sullivan
Labour
Elected mayor
John Beanland
Citizens'

The Christchurch mayoral by-election in 1936 was triggered by the resignation of the incumbent, Dan Sullivan, who had been appointed cabinet minister after the Labour Party winning the general election in November 1935. The election was won by John Beanland of the Citizens' Association, who narrowly beat the Labour candidate.

== Background ==
Sullivan was first elected mayor of Christchurch in 1931, when he beat William Hayward. The Labour Party won the November 1935 general election and Sullivan was appointed cabinet minister. Sullivan reluctantly resigned from the mayoralty in February 1936, as the heavy workload of a cabinet minister was incompatible with remaining mayor. After a conference with the Citizens' Association, Sullivan's resignation date was agreed on to achieve a by-election date that suited all parties. There was a desire to hold only one by-election, and not also another one necessary by one of the councillors contesting the mayoral election then causing a vacancy. This required councillors wishing to stand to resign at the same time as the mayor. The mayor's resignation would result in a mayoral by-election at a date set by statute, and the resignation would take immediate effect. The deputy-mayor, John Beanland of the Citizens' Association, was one of the contenders, and to avoid that the city was both without a mayor and deputy-mayor for a period of time, Beanland needed to resign as deputy-mayor before the mayor, so that a new deputy could be appointed by the city councillors before the mayor himself resigned. Beanland resigned as deputy-mayor in early February, and Ernest Andrews was appointed in his place. Councillor John Archer was confirmed as Labour's candidate; he had previously been mayor from 1925 to 1931. The resignations of Sullivan as mayor, and Beanland (Citizens' Association) and Archer (Labour) as city councillors, were handed in on 14 February, triggering a by-election for 11 March. Councillor Charles Edward Jones also resigned due to illness, thus creating a third vacancy amongst the city councillors.

== Candidates ==
John Beanland
John Beanland was a building contractor. Born and raised in Victoria, Australia, he moved to Christchurch with his wife and children in the early 1890s. Active in many clubs and on various committees, he was first elected as a Christchurch city councillor in 1914 for the conservative Citizens' Association. He first stood for mayor in 1921 when he was defeated by the incumbent, Henry Thacker. His next mayoral campaign in 1925 caused a serious rift within the Citizens' Association, and he ended up standing as an independent against three others, including the official candidate of the Citizens' Association and incumbent mayor, James Arthur Flesher. This vote splitting in 1925 helped Labour's John Archer win the mayoralty. Beanland stood for the Reform Party in the 1928 general election in Lyttelton but was unsuccessful against the incumbent.

John Archer
Rev John Archer was a Baptist minister and Labour Party politician. He was the foundation president of the Invercargill WEA (Workers' Educational Association) in 1915 and president of the Baptist Union of New Zealand from 1916 to 1918. The Baptist Church transferred him to Christchurch in 1919. He was active in the Labour Party from its beginnings and was vice-president for many years, and president in 1928–29. He had stood in various electorates for the general elections of 1919, 1922, 1928, and 1931. He was a Christchurch city councillor from 1921 and had previously served on the Invercargill Borough council. He had first stood for mayor in the 1925 election mentioned above and was successful due to vote splitting by the Citizens' Association candidates. He won the subsequent elections in 1927 and 1929 and retired in 1931 in favour of Sullivan.

Edward Leslie Hills
Hills was an independent Labour candidate. He had not previously served as a Christchurch city councillor but had stood in the Lyttelton electorate by-elections in 1933 and 1935, on both occasions polling just over 2% of the votes.

City council candidates
In addition to the mayoral election, there were three vacancies amongst the Christchurch city councillors to be filled. Seven candidates came forward: three representing the Citizens' Association (Hugh Acland, James Maling, and James Carter), three representing the Labour Party (Robert Macfarlane, John Mathison, and George Manning), and one independent (Berthold Ahlfeld).

== Results ==
The election was held on Wednesday, 11 March 1936, from 9am to 7pm. The first-past-the-post voting system was used. There were 17 polling booths in Christchurch Central, 17 polling booths across Linwood, Bromley, and Woolston, 19 polling booths across St Albans, Papanui, and Richmond, 23 polling booths across Sydenham and Spreydon, and 1 polling booth in Lyttelton. Beanland narrowly won the mayoral election over Archer, with Hills receiving less than 2% of the votes. This was the first time since the 1925 mayoral election that the mayoralty did not go to the Labour candidate.

1936 Christchurch mayoral by-election
Party	Candidate	Votes	%	±%
Citizens'	John Beanland	15,141	50.60	
Labour	John Archer	14,310	47.82	
Independent Labour	Edward Leslie Hills	472	1.58	
Informal votes		244	0.80	
Majority		831	2.78	
Turnout		30,167		

=== Councillor results ===
In the by-election for vacant city council positions, Acland, Macfarlane and Manning were successful. Beanland and the new councillors were sworn in on 16 March.

1936 Christchurch city council by-election
Party	Candidate	Votes	%	±%
Citizens'	Hugh Acland	15,749	52.19	
Labour	Robert Macfarlane	14,800	49.05	+9.64
Labour	George Manning	14,689	48.68	+6.53
Citizens'	James Maling	13,896	46.05	+3.47
Labour	John Mathison	13,465	44.62	+6.08
Citizens'	James Carter	11,792	39.08	+0.94
Independent	Berthold Ahlfeld	1,390	4.60	
Informal votes		711	2.35	
Majority		793	2.62	
Turnout		30,173		

== Aftermath ==
At the end of his mayoral term, Beanland failed to get the nomination from the Citizens' Association for the 1938 mayoral election, but Dr. John Guthrie was chosen instead. Guthrie was beaten by Labour's Robert Macfarlane.
