= 1983 Christchurch City Council election =

Local election in New Zealand

- 8 October 1983
- Turnout: 41,827
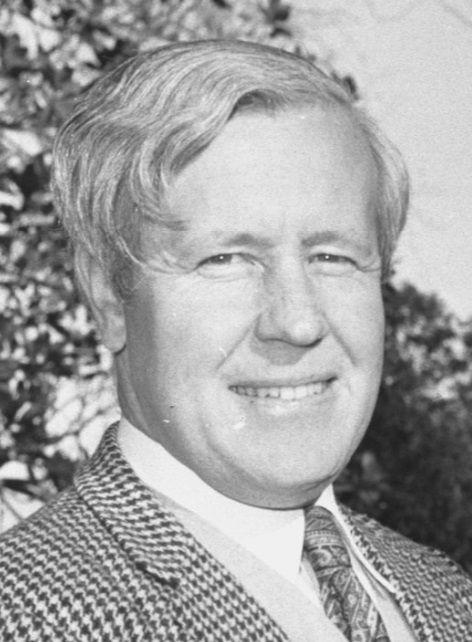

Candidate	Hamish Hay	Rex Lester
Party	Citizens'	Labour
Popular vote	27,263	14,065
Percentage	65.18	33.62
Mayor before election
Hamish Hay
Elected mayor
Hamish Hay

The 1983 Christchurch City Council election was a local election held from September to 8 October in Christchurch, New Zealand, as part of that year's nation-wide local elections. Voters elected the mayor of Christchurch and 19 city councillors for the 1983–1986 term of the Christchurch City Council. The first-past-the-post voting system was used. In-person voting at a polling station was used for the last time in Christchurch; postal voting would be introduced for the 1986 Christchurch City Council election.

== Background ==
Terry McCombs, who represented the Labour Party on Christchurch City Council, died in November 1982. He was replaced by Mollie Clark, who was appointed to the role in February 1983.

The Christchurch Citizens' Association started advertising for city council candidates in early March 1983. Their campaign chair was Newton Dodge. The Citizens' Association received 28 nominations for positions at Christchurch City Council and other local bodies.

The Labour Party announced that they would close their call for city council candidates by 31 March 1983, with candidates announced after a regional conference in mid-April. The selection process was later changed, and the decisions deferred to ward selection meetings. The South ward candidates were announced on 5 May. In the East ward, incumbent councillor Audrey Barclay announced her retirement and withdrew her nomination in May 1983. The three other East ward incumbents were confirmed as candidates, and Graeme Macann chosen as replacement for Barclay.

Early voting was available at some polling booths between 5 and 7 October. Election day was Saturday, 8 October, and booths were open from 9 am to 7 pm. The electoral officer was W. R. Davies. This was the last time that Christchurch City used in-person voting. The adjacent Waimairi District had switched to postal voting in 1983 and by 6 October—two days prior to polling day— it was reported that they had already achieved a higher turnout than three years earlier.

== Ward results ==
Nineteen councillors were elected across five wards, with each ward being represented by four councillors, or three in the case of the West ward. Both the Citizens' Association and Labour Party put forward nineteen candidates each for the council. In addition, there was one non-affiliated perennial candidate, making for 39 city council candidates in total.

=== Pegasus ward ===
Four councillors were elected in the Pegasus ward. There were eight candidates: four each from the Citizens' Association and Labour Party.

Pegasus ward (4)
Party	Candidate	Votes	%	±%
Labour	Vicki Buck*	5,922		
Labour	David Close*	4,625		
Labour	Noala Massey*	4,239		
Labour	Kathie Lowe*	4,097		
Citizens'	Alan Cockburn	3,218		
Citizens'	Carole Evans	3,114		
Citizens'	Bob Andrews	2,974		
Citizens'	Steve Richens	2,653		
Informal votes		90		
Turnout				

=== East ward ===
Four councillors were elected in the East ward. There were eight candidates: four each from the Citizens' Association and Labour Party.

East ward (4)
Party	Candidate	Votes	%	±%
Citizens'	Rex Arbuckle	5,160		
Labour	Mollie Clark*	5,125		
Citizens'	Clive Cotton*	4,829		
Citizens'	Louise Moore	4,622		
Labour	Charles Manning*	4,514		
Labour	Alistair Graham*	4,210		
Labour	Graeme Macann	4,027		
Citizens'	Murray Ludemann	4,010		
Informal votes		128		
Turnout				

=== South ward ===
Four councillors were elected in the South ward. There were nine candidates: four each from the Citizens' Association and Labour Party, plus a perennial candidate, Michael Hansen (later known as Tubby Hansen).

Based on preliminary results, John Horgan from the Citizens' Association had come forth and was thus elected. When the final results were published, though, Labour's incumbent Alister James was ahead of Horgan.

South ward (4)
Party	Candidate	Votes	%	±%
Labour	Rex Lester*	5,084		
Citizens'	Morgan Fahey*	5,077		
Labour	Alex Clark*	4,455		
Labour	Alister James*	3,856		
Labour	Ruby Fowler	3,820		
Citizens'	John Horgan	3,777		
Citizens'	Ian Rivers	3,562		
Citizens'	Roy Price	3,422		
Euthenics	Michael Hansen	304		
Informal votes		120		
Turnout				

=== North ward ===
Four councillors were elected in the North ward. There were eight candidates: four each from the Citizens' Association and Labour Party. Two Labour Party incumbents lost their seats.

North ward (4)
Party	Candidate	Votes	%	±%
Citizens'	John Burn	4,632		
Citizens'	Anne Evans	4,464		
Labour	Geoff Stone*	4,457		
Citizens'	Ron Wright	4,414		
Citizens'	Patrick Neary	4,404		
Labour	Mary Gray	4,152		
Labour	Don Rowlands*	4,069		
Labour	Louisa Crawley*	4,025		
Informal votes				
Turnout				

=== West ward ===
Three councillors were elected in the West ward. There were six candidates: three each from the Citizens' Association and Labour Party. The three incumbents from the Citizens' Association retained their seats.

West ward (3)
Party	Candidate	Votes	%	±%
Citizens'	Maurice Carter*	5,128		
Citizens'	Matthew Glubb	4,814		
Citizens'	Helen Garrett	4,806		
Labour	John Stewart	1,801		
Labour	John Freeman	1,745		
Labour	Frank Minehan	1,633		
Informal votes		85		
Turnout				
