= 1986 Christchurch City Council election =

Local election in New Zealand

- 11 October 1986
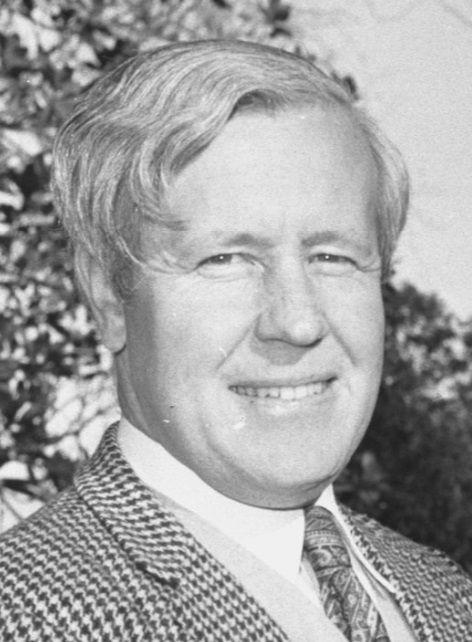

Candidate	Hamish Hay	Alex Clark
Party	Citizens' Association	Labour
Popular vote	39,239	22,918
Percentage	60.95	35.60
Mayor before election
Hamish Hay
Citizens' Association
Elected mayor
Hamish Hay
Citizens' Association
- Councillors
- All 19 seats on the City Council; 10 seats needed for a majority

The 1986 Christchurch City Council election was a local election held from September to 11 October in Christchurch, New Zealand, as part of that year's nation-wide local elections. Voters elected the mayor of Christchurch and 19 city councillors for the 1986–1989 term of the Christchurch City Council. The first-past-the-post voting system was used. Postal voting was used for the first time in Christchurch, and as with councils that had introduced this method earlier, it increased the turnout.

== Background ==
Waimairi District had introduced postal voting in the 1983 local elections and had a good experience. The cost of running an election had decreased, and voter turnout increased. With the remaining local bodies introducing postal voting, including Christchurch City, the metropolitan Christchurch area now all used the postal voting system. One consequence of the change was that on polling day, the votes had to be with the returning officer by noon, whereas the polling booths had previously been open until 7 pm. Voters received their polling documents from 26 September onwards.

Residents were asked to contact the electoral officer if they had not received their voting forms by 2 October. Voters had until 10:30 am on Friday, 10 October, to have their envelope in a mailbox for it to delivered to the returning officer by the next day.

Christchurch City Council administered the election with 40 temporary staff to compile and send out the voting documents, increasing to 240 staff needed on election for counting.

== Mayoral election ==
Sitting Mayor Hamish Hay was re-elected for a fifth term with a decreased majority, defeating councillor Alex Clark of the Labour Party, who had likewise lost to Hay in 1977.

== Ward results ==
Nineteen councillors were elected across five wards, with each ward being represented by four councillors, or three in the case of the West ward. Both the Christchurch Citizens' Association and Labour Party put forward nineteen candidates each for the council.

=== North ward ===
Four councillors were elected in the North ward. There were eight candidates: four each from the Christchurch Citizens' Association and Labour Party.

North ward (4)
Party	Candidate	Votes	%	±%
Citizens'	John Burn*	6,640		
Citizens'	Ron Wright*	6,237		
Citizens'	Dennis Rich	6,208		
Labour	Linda Constable	6,098		
Labour	John Gray	5,707		
Labour	Doreen Collins	5,669		
Labour	Susan Sotheran	5,571		
Citizens'	Doug Irving	5,466		
Informal votes		452		
Turnout				

=== South ward ===
Four councillors were elected in the South ward. There were nine candidates: four each from the Christchurch Citizens' Association and Labour Party, plus a perennial candidate, Michael Hansen (later known as Tubby Hansen). Louise Moore, who stood for the Labour Party, was the only incumbent councillor across all wards who failed to get re-elected.

South ward (4)
Party	Candidate	Votes	%	±%
Citizens'	Morgan Fahey*	7,604		
Labour	Alex Clark*	7,205		
Labour	Alister James*	6,310		
Labour	Ruby Fowler*	6,224		
Labour	Maevis Watson	5,998		
Citizens'	Louise Moore*	5,399		
Citizens'	Veronica Pyle	4,945		
Citizens'	Roy Price	4,711		
Euthenics	Michael Hansen	790		
Informal votes		219		
Turnout				

=== West ward ===
Three councillors were elected in the West ward. There were eight candidates: three each from the Christchurch Citizens' Association and Labour Party, plus two independents running under the banner of Ratepayers' Protection.

West ward (3)
Party	Candidate	Votes	%	±%
Citizens'	Maurice Carter*	5,848		
Citizens'	Carole Evans	5,361		
Citizens'	Ron Wilton	4,705		
Labour	Hine Conner	2,378		
Labour	Trevor Warr	2,176		
Labour	Bruce Dyer	2,101		
Ratepayers'	John Thacker	2,089		
Ratepayers'	Kim Pettengell	2,070		
Informal votes		295		
Turnout				

=== East ward ===
Four councillors were elected in the East ward. There were ten candidates: four each from the Christchurch Citizens' Association and Labour Party, plus two independents running under the banner of Ratepayers' Protection.

East ward (4)
Party	Candidate	Votes	%	±%
Citizens'	Rex Arbuckle*	7,277		
Citizens'	Clive Cotton*	6,739		
Labour	Charles Manning	6,491		
Citizens'	David Cox	5,818		
Labour	Denis O'Rourke	5,606		
Labour	Peter Dyhrberg	5,477		
Citizens'	Jim McMillan	5,307		
Labour	Brian Johnson	5,156		
Ratepayers'	Ann Lewis	3,409		
Ratepayers'	Peter Foster	2,910		
Informal votes		288		
Turnout				

=== Pegasus ward ===
Four councillors were elected in the Pegasus ward. There were eight candidates: four each from the Citizens' Association and Labour Party.

Pegasus ward (4)
Party	Candidate	Votes	%	±%
Labour	Vicki Buck*	9,494		
Labour	David Close*	8.044		
Labour	Noala Massey*	7,380		
Labour	Hori Brennan	5,644		
Citizens'	Bob Andrews	5,331		
Citizens'	Bill Morgan	4,743		
Citizens'	Shirley Perriton	4,742		
Citizens'	Jeannettte Hoogerwerf	4,291		
Informal votes		223		
Turnout				

=== Ward summary ===
Christchurch city councillors elected
Ward	Party	Elected
North	Citizens	John Burn*
North	Citizens	Ron Wright
North	Citizens	Dennis Rich
North	Labour	Linda Constable
South	Citizens	Morgan Fahey*
South	Labour	Alex Clark*
South	Labour	Alister James*
South	Labour	Ruby Fowler*
West	Citizens	Maurice Carter*
West	Citizens	Carole Evans
West	Citizens	Ron Wilton
East	Citizens	Rex Arbuckle*
East	Citizens	Clive Cotton*
East	Labour	Charles Manning
East	Citizens	David Cox
Pegasus	Labour	Vicki Buck*
Pegasus	Labour	David Close*
Pegasus	Labour	Noala Massey*
Pegasus	Labour	Hori Brennan

Footnotes: * denotes incumbents

== Aftermath ==
Seven councillors were new to the city council. The town clerk summed the election result up as "no change". Hamish Hay remained mayor, and his Citizens' Association had a ten councillors compared to nine from the Labour Party. That mirrored the majority after the 1983 local election. The Christchurch Ratepayers' Protection Committee had arisen from the 1985 rates revolt, but their four candidates came last in the wards they stood. Maurice Carter remained the deputy mayor; he had been on the city council since the 1956 local elections.
