= 1956 Christchurch mayoral election =

Mayoral election in New Zealand

- 17 November 1956
- Turnout: 37,421 (42.45%)
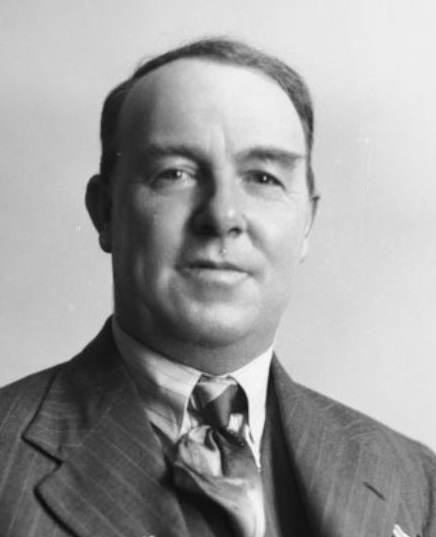

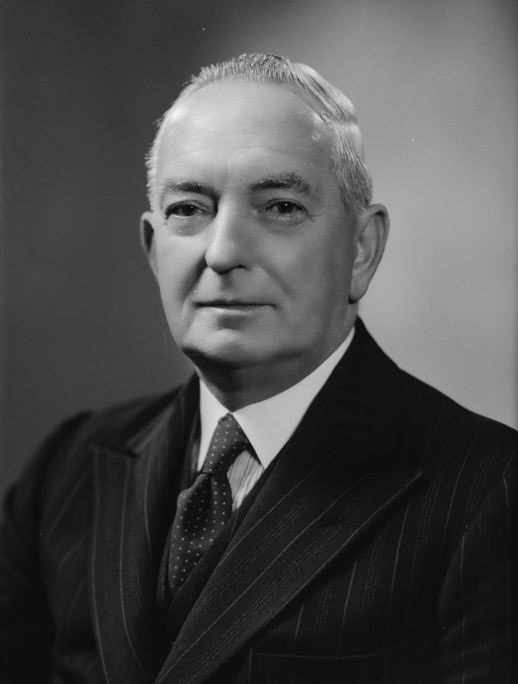
Candidate	Robert Macfarlane	Bill MacGibbon
Party	Labour	Citizens'
Popular vote	20,368	17,053
Percentage	54.43	45.57
Mayor before election
Robert Macfarlane
Elected mayor
Robert Macfarlane

The 1956 Christchurch mayoral election was part of the New Zealand local elections held that same year. In 1956, election were held for the Mayor of Christchurch plus other local government positions. The polling was conducted using the standard first-past-the-post electoral method.

== Background ==
Sitting mayor Robert Macfarlane was re-elected for a fourth term, opposed only by Bill MacGibbon of the Citizens' Association who had run against Macfarlane in 1950.

== Mayoral results ==
The following table gives the election results:

1956 Christchurch mayoral election
Party	Candidate	Votes	%	±%
Labour	Robert Macfarlane	20,368	54.43	+2.36
Citizens'	Bill MacGibbon	17,053	45.57	
Majority		3,315	8.85	+4.22
Turnout		37,421	42.45	−6.35

== Council results ==
1956 Christchurch local election
Party	Candidate	Votes	%	±%
Labour	George Manning	20,837	55.68	−0.41
Citizens'	Les Amos	19,574	52.30	+6.41
Labour	Mabel Howard	19,529	52.18	+0.52
Citizens'	Mary McLean	19,418	51.89	+4.42
Citizens'	Bill Glue	19,136	51.13	+5.26
Citizens'	Harold Smith	18,977	50.71	+9.20
Labour	Lyn Christie	18,446	49.29	+1.54
Citizens'	Tom Burtt	18,175	48.56	
Labour	John Mathison	18,037	48.20	−1.57
Citizens'	Ron Guthrey	17,899	47.83	+4.69
Citizens'	Maurice Carter	17,533	46.85	
Citizens'	William James Cowles	17,442	46.61	+4.76
Labour	Mick Connelly	16,975	45.36	
Citizens'	Reginald Gilbert Brown	16,801	44.89	+3.85
Citizens'	Bill Utley	16,674	44.55	
Citizens'	William Ernest Olds	16,490	44.06	
Labour	Harold Denton	16,347	43.68	
Labour	Norman Reginald Forbes	16,194	43.27	−1.32
Citizens'	Alma Schumacher	16,154	43.16	
Labour	Reg Stillwell	16,142	43.13	
Citizens'	Fred Price	16,139	43.12	+2.74
Citizens'	Kenneth Bartlett	16,019	42.80	
Citizens'	John William Hulme	16,003	42.76	
Citizens'	Peter Watts	15,880	42.43	
Citizens'	Walter Raymond Campbell	15,813	42.25	
Labour	Arthur John Smith	15,782	42.17	+1.91
Citizens'	George Griffiths	15,667	41.86	+1.64
Labour	Roy Smith	15,618	41.73	+2.42
Labour	James Shankland Sr.	15,512	41.45	−1.07
Citizens'	Wilfred Henry Blyth Buckhurst	15,286	40.84	
Labour	Archibald Galbraith	14,860	39.71	
Labour	Edith Tongue	14,710	39.30	
Labour	James Sturrock	14,592	38.99	−1.27
Labour	John Athol Gregor	14,589	38.98	
Labour	Robert Newman	14,308	38.23	−1.71
Labour	John Palmer	14,220	38.00	
Labour	Louis Julian Mouat	13,101	35.00	
Labour	Joshua Harris	13,038	34.84	
Independent	Charles Baldwin	5,565	14.87	
Communist	Jack Locke	2,661	7.11	+0.03
Ind. Social Credit	Ernest Yealands	2,048	5.47	
Communist	Frank McNulty	1,931	5.16	
