= Bill MacGibbon =

New Zealand businessman and politician

Bill MacGibbon OBE
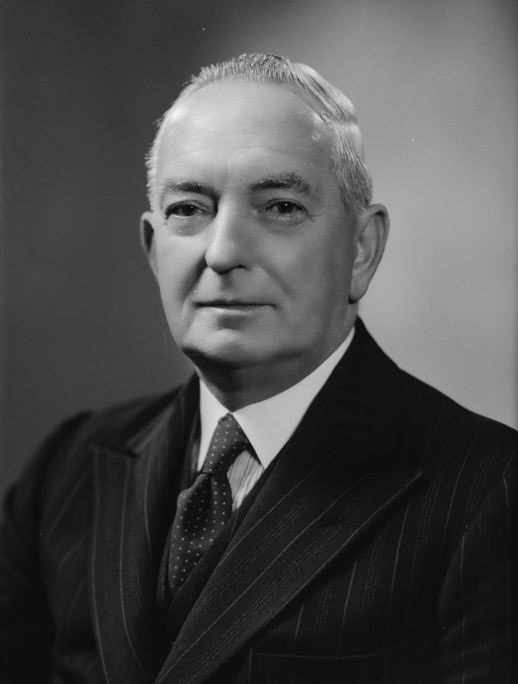

36th Chairman of the Lyttelton Harbour Board
- In office 6 June 1945 – December 1947
- Preceded by: John McAlpine
- Succeeded by: Charles William Tyler

Personal details
- Born: William Smith MacGibbon; 1891 Edinburgh, Scotland
- Died: 11 May 1962 (aged 70–71) Christchurch, New Zealand
- Spouse: Alison Lucy MacLeod
- Occupation: Accountant

William Smith MacGibbon OBE (1891 – 11 May 1962) was a New Zealand businessman and politician.

== Biography ==
=== Early life and career ===
MacGibbon was born in Edinburgh before emigrating to New Zealand with his parents as a child. They settled in Rangiora where he was educated at the local public school. In 1904 he gained employment with the Post and Telegraph Department before leaving in 1907 to join the staff of an accountancy firm in Ashburton. He moved to Christchurch in 1908 to work at the legal firm Duncan, Coterill and Company. He also taught accountancy and was a lecturer at both Christchurch Technical College and University of Canterbury between 1911 and 1919. He was an accountant for the firm until 1917 when he started his own accountancy business together with a business partner, Mr W. J. Mason. They established the firm of MacGibbon, Mason and Company before MacGibbon became the sole proprietor in 1921.

From his accountancy business, his business interests spread out to the insurance industry as well. He became one of Christchurch's best known businessmen and was a director of several other companies. He became involved with the Canterbury Chamber of Commerce and was president from 1938 to 1941 and later a life member. In 1940 he was president of the Associated Chamber of Commerce of New Zealand.

MacGibbon was a benefactor of a multitude of local charities and trusts. He was a member of the Canterbury Museum Trust Board (and chairman from 1959), a founder of the Hard of Hearing League, gave funds for a planetarium and was a member of the Savage Club and Lions International. Despite never serving in the military himself he was a patron and organiser of many patriotic funds that supported New Zealand's war effort in both the first and second world wars including the Canterbury Patriotic Fund and New Zealand Navy League. His personal interests included tennis and gardening.

=== Political involvement ===
In 1926 he was elected to the executive of the Christchurch Citizens' Association. He was the chief organiser for the Citizens' ticket at the 1936 elections which saw the Citizens' Association regain the mayoralty. He had been elected a member of the Christchurch City Council the previous year and was a member for twelve years at various times (1935–1937, 1947–1950, 1953–1956 and 1958–1962). He was chairman of many council committees and at the time of his death he was chairman of the electricity committee. He was interested in the beautification of the city. He gave the MacGibbon gates at Hagley Park to the city, paid for the fence at the Christchurch Botanic Gardens and put protection in place for Cathedral Square to remain a centrepiece for the city. He was also the city council representative on the Christchurch Fire Board.

In 1941 he was elected a member of the Lyttelton Harbour Board and on 6 June 1945 he was elected Chairman of the Harbour Board. As chairman of the Harbour Board he oversaw an upgrade in the port facilities to accommodate larger sized ships.

In 1941 he was elected to the Christchurch Transport Board. MacGibbon was prominent in lobbying for the construction of a road tunnel to Lyttelton. In 1944 he was finally able to convince the government to allow plans to be prepared by the Ministry of Works which eventually lead to the construction of the Lyttelton road tunnel. In 1946 he was elected the chairperson of the Transport Board.

In both 1950 and 1956 he stood as the Citizens' candidate for Mayor of Christchurch but was defeated both times by Labour's Robert Macfarlane.

He was an early advocate of metropolitan town planning and would go on to become a long time member of the Christchurch Regional Planning Authority where he helped to see a regional plan for the area come to fruition. He had previously tried to do so as a member of the Metropolitan Town Planning Committee.

=== Death ===
MacGibbon died suddenly on 11 May 1962. While on his way to a meeting he collapsed in Tramway Lane and rushed to Christchurch Hospital where he was declared dead on arrival. Earlier that day he had officially opened new pensioner cottages in Spreydon. He was survived by his wife.

His funeral was held in ChristChurch Cathedral with the cathedral in full attendance with the crowd spilling outside into both Cathedral Square and Colombo Street. Many tributes were given at the funeral and at that week's city council meeting all highlighting MacGibbon's community service and contributions.

The city council decided against either making an appointment or holding a by-election to fill the vacancy caused by his death and his seat remained empty until the scheduled 1962 elections in October.

== Honours ==
MacGibbon was appointed an Officer of the Order of the British Empire, for services to commerce and local government, in the 1952 Queen's Birthday Honours. The following year, he was awarded the Queen Elizabeth II Coronation Medal.

Political offices
| Preceded by John McAlpine | Chairman of the Lyttelton Harbour Board; 1945–1947 | Succeeded by Charles William Tyler |
