= 1923 New Zealand Labour Party leadership election =

New Zealand party leadership election

- February 1923
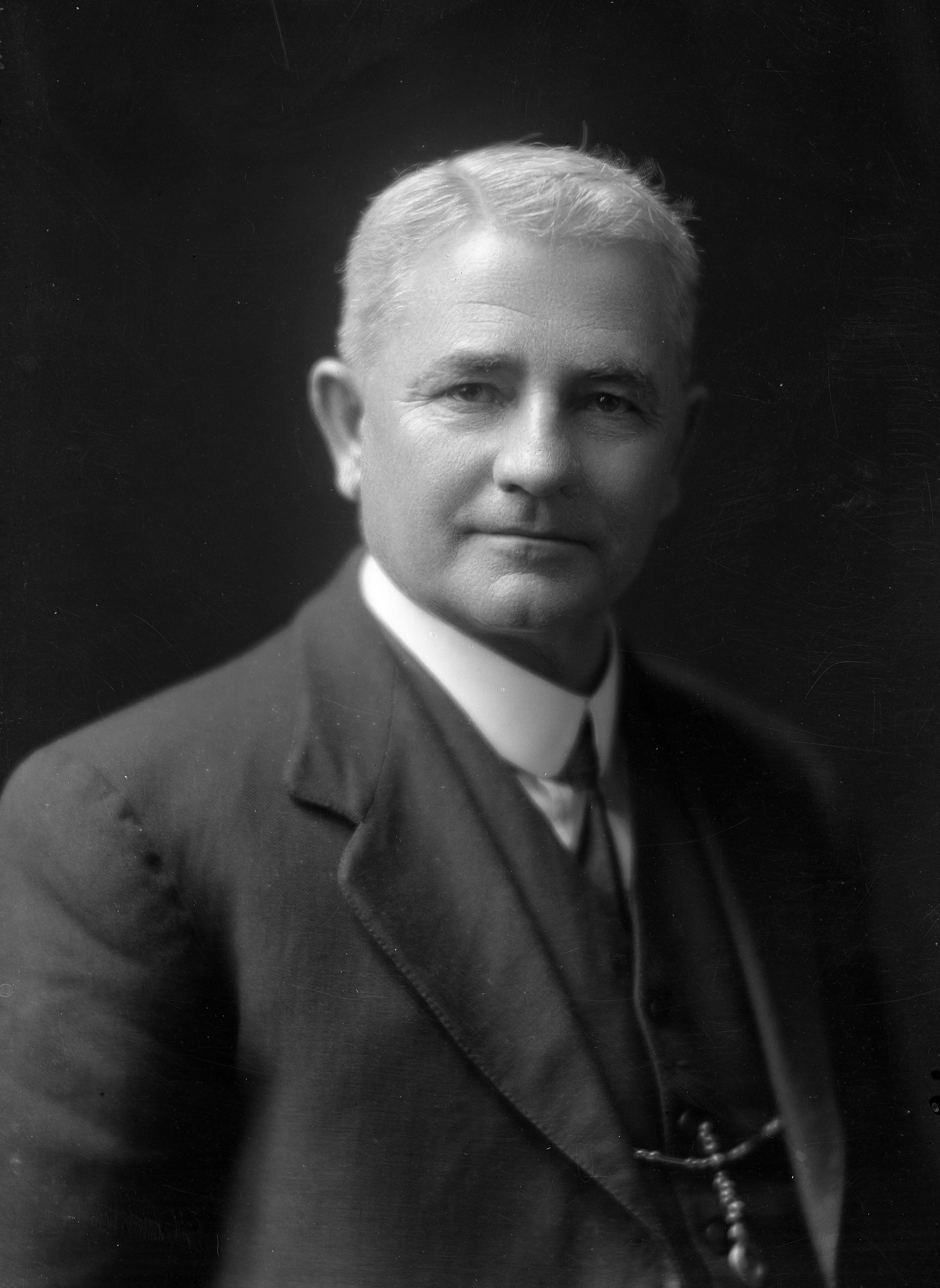

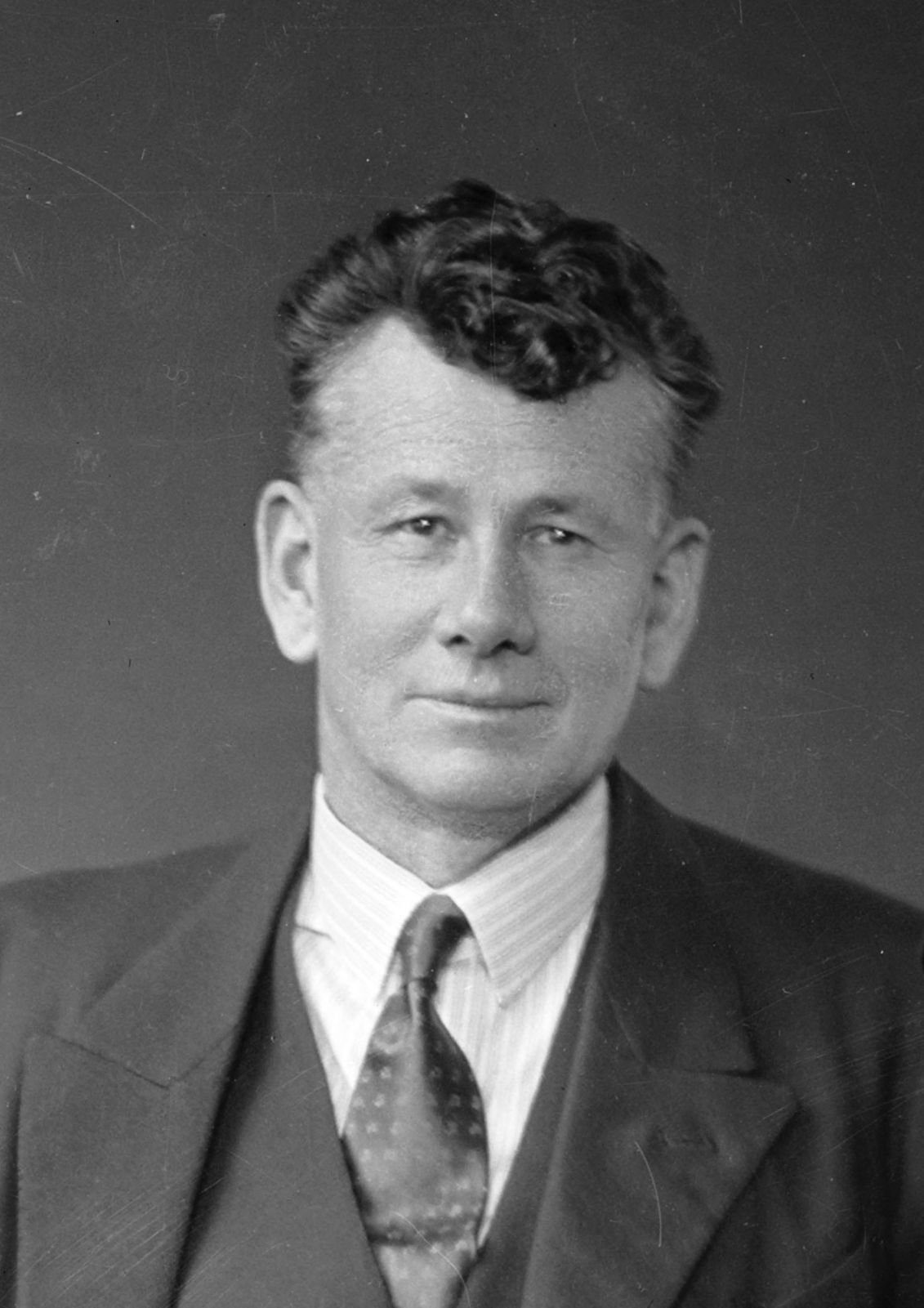
Candidate	Harry Holland	Dan Sullivan
Popular vote	14	3
Percentage	82.35%	17.65%
Leader before election
Harry Holland
Leader after election
Harry Holland

The 1923 New Zealand Labour Party leadership election was held in February 1923 to determine the future leadership of the New Zealand Labour Party. The election was won by Buller MP Harry Holland, once again retaining office.

== Background ==
Despite high hopes Labour had underperformed at the 1922 election. While the party had gained an extra nine seats in Parliament, it failed in its main objective to supersede the Liberal Party as the official opposition. The more moderate Labour MPs saw this as an opportunity to finally replace Harry Holland as leader of the party.

James McCombs proposed that an office in the Labour Party should not be held by one member for longer than one Parliamentary term at a time, which was seconded by Sullivan. Rather than challenge Holland himself personally, as had been the case in the previous leadership elections, the pair appealed to the democratic nature of the party and hoped it would appeal to the influx of new members.

== Candidates ==
=== Harry Holland ===
Holland had been Labour's leader since 1919 surviving several leadership challenges (opposed in all by McCombs). Many supported him as leader due to his stern emphasis on teamwork and majority rule which gave his colleagues a certain amount of freedom to speak out on issues themselves, so long as they didn't directly contravene Holland himself.

=== Dan Sullivan ===
Dan Sullivan had been an MP since 1919 and at the time was Labour’s senior whip. He was a moderate and had supported all of the previous challenges against Holland by Jimmy McCombs. He was one of the mainly Christchurch based MPs who found Holland's leadership to be too autocratic and overbearing.

== Result ==
The election was conducted through a members ballot by Labour's parliamentary caucus. Holland secured fourteen votes to Sullivan's three. Sullivan next stood for the Deputy-leader role, but was defeated by Holland's preferred candidate Michael Joseph Savage 11 votes to 16.

=== Leadership ballot ===
Name	Votes	Percentage
Harry Holland	14	82.35%
Dan Sullivan	3	17.65%

=== Deputy-leadership ballot ===
Name	Votes	Percentage
Michael Joseph Savage	11	64.70%
Dan Sullivan	6	35.30%

== Aftermath ==
Harry Holland would continue to lead the Labour Party without any further challenges to his leadership until his death in 1933. Sullivan's failure to secure the Leader and Deputy-leader positions signalled to the moderate wing of the Labour Party that they were clearly the caucus minority. After his election as the deputy-chair, Savage proposed that the votes for leadership positions be held at the start of every new parliament rather than annually. After a long discussion, the motion was carried 10 votes to 5.
