= 1950 Christchurch mayoral election =

New Zealand mayoral election

- 18 November 1950
- Turnout: 36,075 (37.08%)
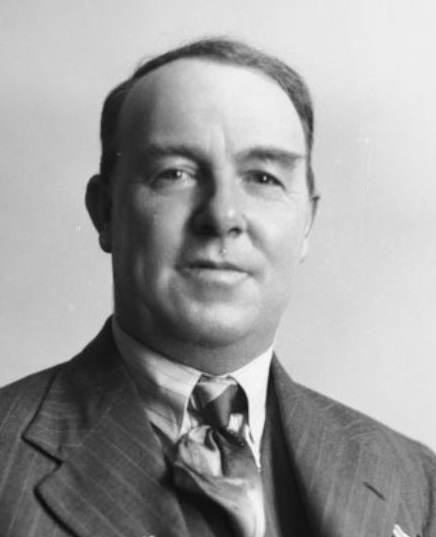

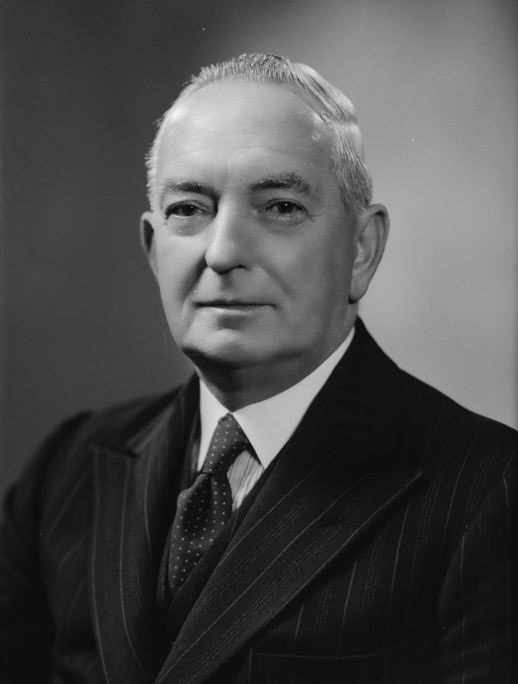
Candidate	Robert Macfarlane	Bill MacGibbon
Party	Labour	Citizens'
Popular vote	16,385	15,129
Percentage	45.41	41.91
Mayor before election
Ernest Andrews
Elected mayor
Robert Macfarlane

The 1950 Christchurch mayoral election was part of the New Zealand local elections held that same year. In 1950, election were held for the Mayor of Christchurch plus other local government positions. The polling was conducted using the standard first-past-the-post electoral method.

== Background ==
Sitting mayor Ernest Andrews did not seek re-election, and former mayor Robert Macfarlane won the position against Bill MacGibbon, who for many years was the chairman of the Tramway Board. The Labour Party gained a majority on the city council, winning twelve seats to the seven won by the Citizens' Association.

== Mayoral results ==
The following table gives the election results:

1950 Christchurch mayoral election
Party	Candidate	Votes	%	±%
Labour	Robert Macfarlane	16,385	45.41	
Citizens'	Bill MacGibbon	15,120	41.91	
Independent	Jim Clarke	4,176	11.57	
Informal votes		394	1.09	+0.68
Majority		1,265	3.50	
Turnout		36,075	37.08	−9.12

== Council results ==
1950 Christchurch local election
Party	Candidate	Votes	%	±%
Labour	George Manning	20,458	56.70	+4.99
Labour	Mabel Howard	18,824	52.18	
Labour	Teresa Green	18,722	51.89	+4.21
Citizens	James Hay	18,676	51.76	−6.26
Labour	Terry McCombs	18,654	51.70	
Labour	James Barr	17,584	48.74	
Labour	John Mathison	17,579	48.72	+5.74
Citizens	Leslie George Amos	17,576	48.72	−3.52
Labour	Lyn Christie	17,481	48.45	+6.01
Citizens	Mary McLean	17,110	47.42	−3.93
Citizens	Bill Glue	16,733	46.38	−1.35
Labour	John Edward Jones	16,246	45.03	+3.58
Labour	Arthur John Smith	15,964	44.25	
Citizens	John Edward Tait	15,914	44.11	−2.71
Citizens	Clyde Sheppard	15,909	44.09	−2.18
Labour	Charles Baldwin	15,877	44.01	
Labour	William Percy Warner	15,564	43.14	
Citizens	Ron Guthrey	15,524	43.03	−3.84
Labour	Norman Reginald Forbes	15,358	42.57	+3.52
Labour	Percy Malcolm Velvin	15,290	42.38	
Labour	James Sturrock	15,214	42.17	
Citizens'	Reginald Gilbert Brown	15,175	42.06	
Citizens'	Percey Samuel Turnbull	15,066	41.76	
Citizens'	Robert Reuel Livingstone	15,005	41.59	
Labour	James Shankland Sr.	14,915	41.34	+3.01
Citizens'	William James Cowles	14,891	41.27	−1.18
Labour	Robert Newman	14,878	41.24	
Citizens'	Frank Llewellyn Brandt	14,713	40.78	−1.46
Labour	Jack Leslie Laby	14,665	40.65	+7.16
Citizens'	George Griffiths	14,561	40.36	−3.10
Citizens'	Noel David Bowman	14,470	40.11	
Labour	John Gordon Wilson Power	14,435	40.01	+2.65
Citizens'	Harold Smith	14,121	39.14	
Labour	Herman Tritt	14,101	39.08	
Citizens'	Arthur Norman Stone	13,996	38.79	−2.79
Citizens'	William Barty Gray	13,732	38.06	
Citizens'	James B. Jenkins	13,182	36.54	
Citizens'	James Ronald Smith	13,033	36.12	
Independent	Edith Ann Coomes	3,395	9.41	
Independent	Oliver Moody	2,447	6.78	
Communist	Ian Robert Carruthers	1,793	4.97	
Independent	Ernest Samuel Marshall	1,688	4.67	
Communist	Geoffrey Ley Empson	1,623	4.49	
Independent	William Henry Davies	1,604	4.44	
Communist	Elsie Locke	1,586	4.39	
Communist	Arnold James Cox	1,471	4.07	
Communist	Ronald Taylor	1,436	3.98	
Communist	Mavis Taylor	1,411	3.91	
Communist	Alec Ostler	1,302	3.60	−4.27
Communist	Alison Mary Ostler	1,266	3.50	
Communist	Frank McNulty	1,170	3.24	
Independent	George Alexander Beukes	1,136	3.14	
Independent	Arthur Edward Lyes	1,002	2.77	
Communist	James B. Moses	644	1.78	
