= 1977 Christchurch mayoral election =

New Zealand mayoral election

- 8 October 1977
- Turnout: 48,403 (44.93%)
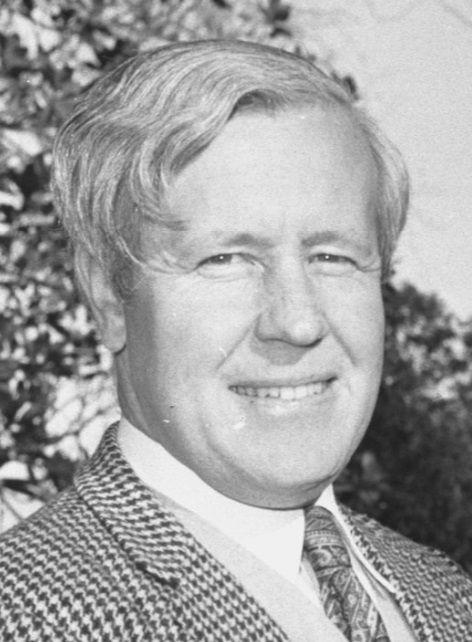

Candidate	Hamish Hay	Alex Clark
Party	Citizens'	Labour
Popular vote	25,558	18,687
Percentage	52.80	38.60
Mayor before election
Hamish Hay
Elected mayor
Hamish Hay

The 1977 Christchurch mayoral election was part of the New Zealand local elections held that same year. In 1977, election were held for the Mayor of Christchurch plus other local government positions. The polling was conducted using the standard first-past-the-post electoral method.

== Background ==
Sitting mayor Hamish Hay was re-elected for a second term, defeating Labour Party challenger Alex Clark. Despite retaining the mayoralty the Citizens' Association lost ground on the city council however, resulting in the composition of the council at ten seats to nine in favour of the Labour Party.

== Results ==
The following table gives the election results:

1977 Christchurch mayoral election
Party	Candidate	Votes	%	±%
Citizens'	Hamish Hay	25,558	52.80	+3.10
Labour	Alex Clark	18,687	38.60	
Values	Peter Heal	3,715	7.67	
Independent	Tubby Hansen	253	0.52	−0.03
Informal votes		190	0.39	+0.03
Majority		6,871	14.19	+10.39
Turnout		48,403	44.93	−15.58

== Ward results ==
Candidates were also elected from wards to the Christchurch City Council.

Party/ticket	Councillors
Labour	10
Citizens'	9
