= John Beanland =

New Zealand mayor (1866–1943)

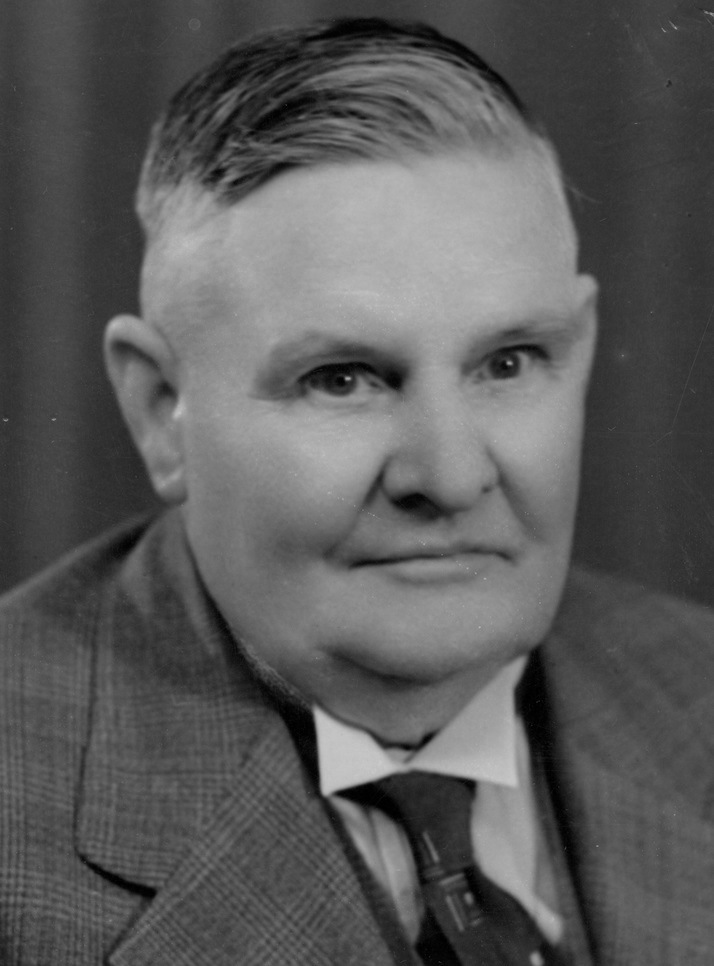
- Beanland in 1938

36th Mayor of Christchurch
- In office 16 March 1936 – 18 May 1938
- Deputy: Ernest Andrews
- Preceded by: Dan Sullivan
- Succeeded by: Robert Macfarlane

Personal details
- Born: 3 November 1866 Ballarat, Victoria, Australia
- Died: 7 December 1943 (aged 77) St Albans, Christchurch, New Zealand
- Resting place: Bromley Cemetery

John Walton Beanland (3 November 1866 – 7 December 1943) was a building contractor and Mayor of Christchurch from 1936 to 1938.

== Early life ==
Beanland was born in Durham Lead near Ballarat, Victoria in 1866. His parents were John Griffith Beanland (1844–1875) and Elizabeth Pickering (1845–1923). The Beanlands were a prominent family in Williamstown near Melbourne, where John Walton lived for about 20 years. He was the eldest of six children. On 18 October 1889, he married Mary Ann Hick and they had two sons: Arnold White Beanland (born 1889) and Walton Howard Beanland (born 1890). His three brothers all married sisters of his wife.

== Life in New Zealand ==
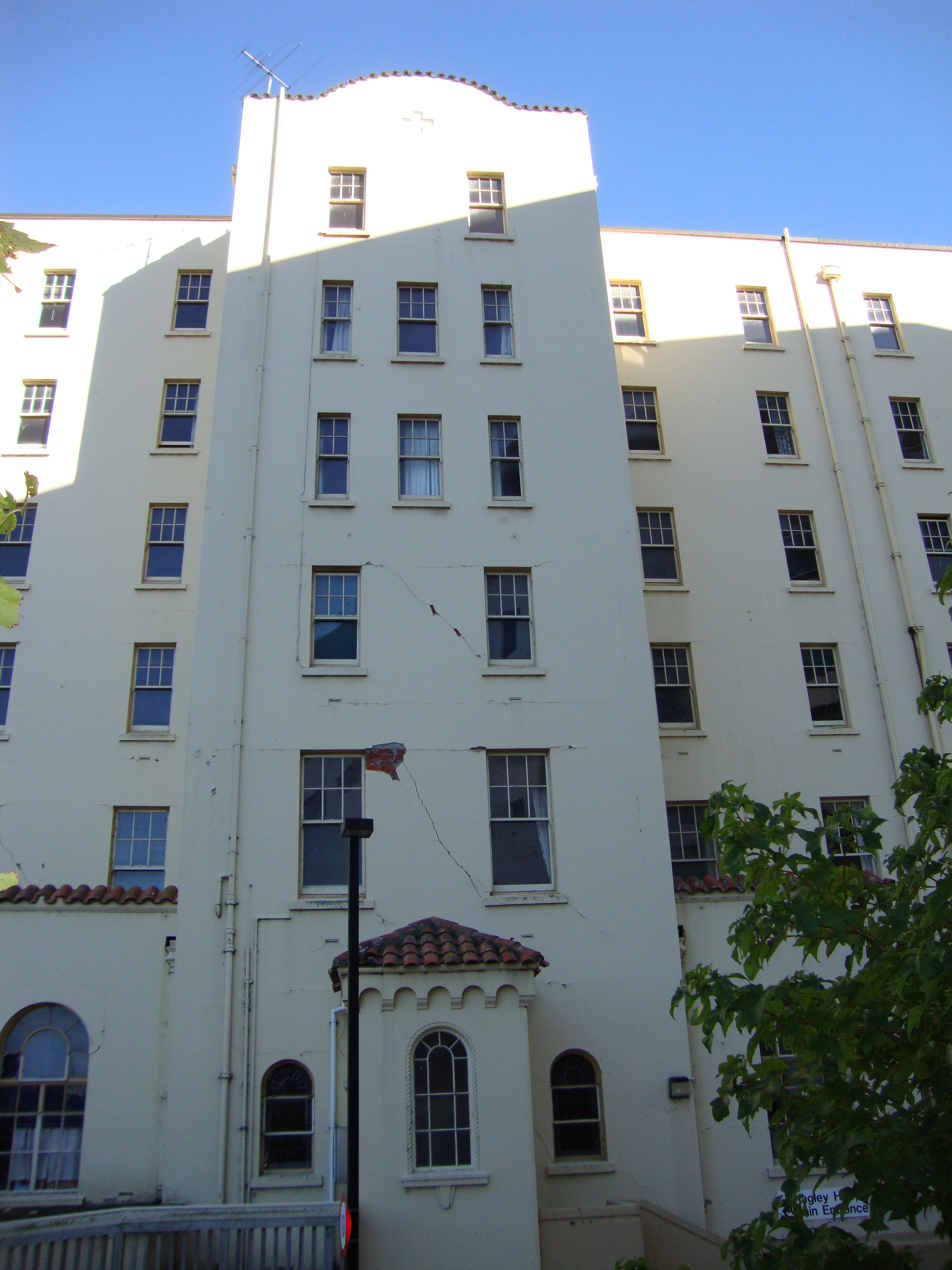
Beanland built the first three storeys of the Nurses' Hostel

Beanland was a master builder, and the family came to Christchurch during a time of depression in Victoria in the early 1890s. His name first appeared in the Christchurch newspaper The Star in 1899, when he was elected onto the committee of the model yacht club. His brother, William Henry Beanland (1874–1960), was also a building contractor in Christchurch. Beanland won the contract to build the first stage of the Nurses' Hostel for £54,990. This allowed for the first three storeys of the building on Riccarton Avenue next to Christchurch Hospital, and construction started in 1931. Beanland was a trustee on the Board of Trustees of the Riccarton Bush from 1919 to 1921.

== Political career ==
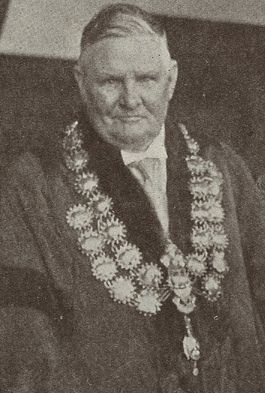
John Beanland wearing mayoral chains

In April 1909, Beanland was elected onto the St Albans School Committee and in 1913, he was elected chairman. He became the president of the St Albans Library Committee. In 1911, Beanland travelled to England to attend the coronation of George V, followed by several months of travel for pleasure.

Beanland was narrowly defeated in January 1912 when he stood for the St Albans seat of the Drainage Board.

He was first elected to Christchurch City Council in 1914 in the St Albans ward for the conservative-leaning Citizens' Association. For several years, he chaired the works committee of Christchurch City Council. He first became deputy mayor after the 1919 mayoral election, and was the second person to hold that post. At the same election, Henry Thacker was first elected as mayor. The next mayoral election was held on Wednesday, 27 April 1921, and the two candidates were Thacker and Beanland. Thacker received 7,580 votes, a majority of 292 votes over the 7,288 votes for Beanland. Beanland had stood for the mayoralty only, and this ended his first period on Christchurch City Council.

Beanland was again elected as a Christchurch city councillor in the 26 April 1923 local election, receiving the second highest number of first preference votes after Rev John Archer. In October 1924, Beanland announced that he would contest the next mayoral election in April 1925, and that he would not stand for re-election for the Christchurch Tramway Board, so that he had sufficient time for the mayoralty. Beanland claimed that he should have the official support of the Citizen's Association, although the incumbent, James Arthur Flesher, also belonged to the Citizen's Association and intended to stand again. Beanland claimed that he had been persuaded in 1923 to not stand for the mayoralty, and that he would in turn receive the support of the Citizens' Association in 1925. This situation apparently caused great friction within the Citizens' Association, but all rumours to this effect were categorically denied. The situation got worse when the Citizens' Association issued a statement to The Press:

The Association has always considered Mr Beanland to be lacking in qualities needed in the Mayor of a city of this size and importance. For that reason it has refused to support him for the Mayoralty on three occasions. It believes Mr Beanland to be a useful member of a Council or a Board. For offices such as these it is ready to support him, but not for the Mayoralty.

In the end, four candidates contested the election: the incumbent, James Arthur Flesher, as the official candidate of the Citizens' Association, Beanland and Joseph Hamlets as independents, and John Archer for the Labour Party. The Citizens' Association vote was split between Flesher and Beanland, and Archer had a majority of some 1100 votes over the incumbent.

Beanland contested the Lyttelton electorate in the 1928 election for the Reform Party, but was beaten by Labour's James McCombs.

In 1934, he embarked on a six months trip that took him to Australia, England and Germany. In 1935, he was awarded the King George V Silver Jubilee Medal.

In February 1936, the mayor of Christchurch, Dan Sullivan, resigned from the mayoralty after he had been appointed by the Labour government as a cabinet minister. Beanland, who was deputy-mayor at the time, contested the resulting by-election and narrowly won against former mayor and Labour candidate John Archer; this brought to an end 11 years of Labour candidates winning the mayoralty. Beanland was sworn in on 16 March. At the end of the mayoral term, the Citizens' Association chose Dr. John Guthrie as their mayoral candidate. Beanland had also sought the nomination but was not successful. Beanland stood as a city councillor and was narrowly returned; he was 15th for the 16 positions, and only three votes ahead of the candidate in 17th place. The new mayor and councillors were installed on 18 May 1938. Beanland retired at the end of the term in 1941.

== Death ==
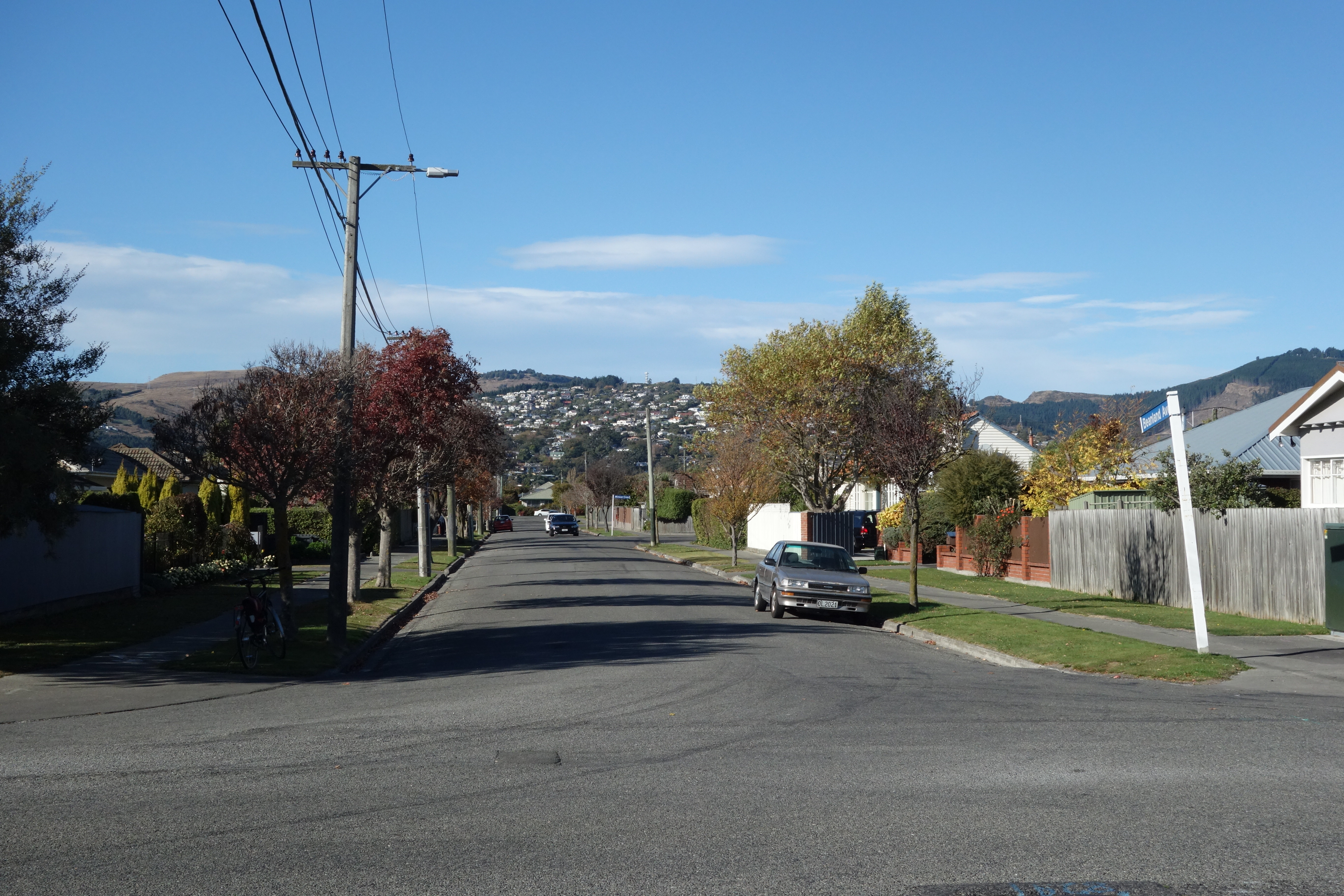
Beanland Avenue in Spreydon

Mary Beanland died on 8 August 1941. He died on 7 December 1943 at his residence at 237 Edgeware Road in the Christchurch suburb of St Albans. He was survived by their two sons. The family grave is at Bromley Cemetery and holds Mary and John Beanland, the wife of their son Walton, and a grandchild.

Beanland Avenue in the Christchurch suburb of Spreydon is named in his honour. The street name was suggested by the Director of Housing Construction for the government housing project, and approved by the Christchurch City Council in April 1938.

Political offices
Preceded by Dan Sullivan	Mayor of Christchurch; 1936–1938	Succeeded by Robert Macfarlane
