= William Hayward (politician) =

New Zealand politician

The Honourable William Hayward

Member of the New Zealand Legislative Council
- In office 22 June 1934 – 21 June 1941

Personal details
- Born: 1868 Christchurch, New Zealand
- Died: 5 June 1943 (aged 74–75) Christchurch, New Zealand
- Resting place: Linwood Cemetery, Christchurch
- Profession: Businessman

William J.S. Hayward (1868 – 5 June 1943) was a member of the New Zealand Legislative Council from 22 June 1934 to 21 June 1941, when his term ended. He was appointed by the United–Reform Coalition Government.

Hayward was born in 1868 in Christchurch, the eldest son of William Hayward. He received his education at St Leo's High School. In the early 1890s he competed as a cyclist winning the 25 Mile Championship of New Zealand in 1891. In 1895, he married Annie Harrington.

Together with his father, he had interests in transport. His father had set up a coach business that supplied the West Coast from Christchurch. Later, he ran coaches within Christchurch that connected with the trams. Together, they bought Rink Stables in 1893, out of which grew Rink Taxis. He established an undertaking business which still exists (Lamb & Hayward Ltd). He was chairman of the Christchurch Tramway Board, chairman of the Canterbury Employers' Association, and chairman of the Canterbury Agricultural and Pastoral Association. A good athlete in his youth, his interest changed to trotting later on. He was a member of the New Zealand Trotting Association, held governance roles in the New Zealand Trotting Association, and was a breeder of horses. He contested the 1929 Christchurch mayoralty but was beaten by the incumbent, Rev John Archer. He then contested the 1931 Christchurch mayoralty but was beaten by Dan Sullivan. From 1935, he was for several years as a member of Christchurch City Council. He was the chairman of the Christchurch branch of the National Party.

Hayward died on 5 June 1943 and is buried at Linwood Cemetery. He was survived by his wife and seven children.
