= James Flesher =

New Zealand mayor (1865–1930)

James Flesher OBE
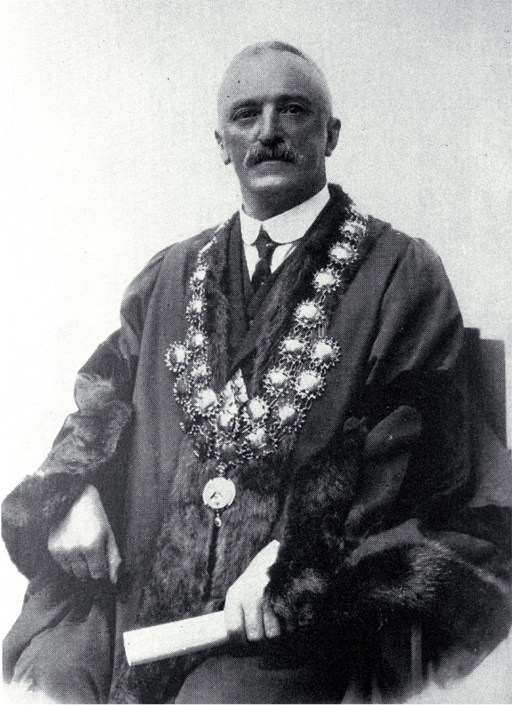

33rd Mayor of Christchurch
- In office 1923–1925
- Preceded by: Henry Thacker
- Succeeded by: John Archer

Personal details
- Born: James Arthur Flesher; 13 August 1865 Christchurch, New Zealand
- Died: 18 August 1930 (aged 65) Christchurch, New Zealand
- Resting place: Avonside Anglican Cemetery; 43.5266°S 172.6586°E
- Spouse: Margaret Lucy England (m. 1900)
- Children: Two
- Occupation: Barrister and solicitor

James Arthur Flesher OBE (13 August 1865 – 18 August 1930) was a politician in Christchurch, New Zealand. He held many public offices and was Mayor of Christchurch from 1923 to 1925.

== Early life ==
Flesher was born on 13 August 1865 in Christchurch. His parents were William Flesher (a land agent) and Dorothy Flesher (née Johnson). He attended Christ's College. He had five sisters and two brothers, and was the eldest of the boys.

After school, he started a legal career, first at the Christchurch and Ashburton offices of Messrs Wilding and Lewis. Four years later, he joined the offices of Messrs Thomas Joynt and Acton Adams. When that firm was dissolved, he joined the offices of Messrs Acton-Adams and Kippenberger. In 1898, he was admitted as a solicitor. In 1899, he was admitted as a barrister and started his own legal practice at 9 Cathedral Square, Christchurch.

Then 34-year-old flesher married 32-year-old Margaret Lucy England on 18 January 1900, at the Wesleyan Church in St Albans. At the time, she was working as a teacher. She was born in Adelaide, Australia to Robert Deakin and Ellen (née Grant). Their relatives E.M. Deakin (Ashburton) and Harold Edmund Flesher were the witnesses to the marriage ceremony.

== Political life ==
Flesher's political career began in either 1891 or 1893, when he was elected onto the Richmond Ward of Christchurch City Council. He was the mayor of the New Brighton Borough from 1915 to 1917. From 1918 to 1920, he represented Christchurch City Council as a councillor. During that time, he chaired the By-laws and Finance Committee. From 1923 to 1925, Flesher was the elected Mayor of Christchurch. He was once again elected councillor for Christchurch City Council in 1928 and held that post until his death. He stood in the 1928 election in the Kaiapoi electorate for the Reform Party and was narrowly beaten by Richard Hawke of the United Party.

Flesher was appointed Officer of the Order of the British Empire (OBE) in 1918 for services in connection with the New Zealand Branch of the British Bed Cross Society and Order of St John.

== Community involvement ==
Flesher was involved in a great number of organisations, and held important roles with many of those:

- Christchurch Tramway Board (1906–1930, including chairman from 1913 to 1916)
- Christchurch Domains Board
- Waimakariri River Trust
- Richmond Domain Board
- Richmond School Committee
- McLean's Institute
- Avon Licensing Committee
- Royal Christchurch Musical Society
- Red Cross
- St John Ambulance
- Canterbury Pilgrims Association
- Richmond Methodist Church ("James Flesher, 4 May 1886" is written on the foundation stone)
- North Canterbury Methodist Sunday School Union (including being its president)

== Avebury House ==
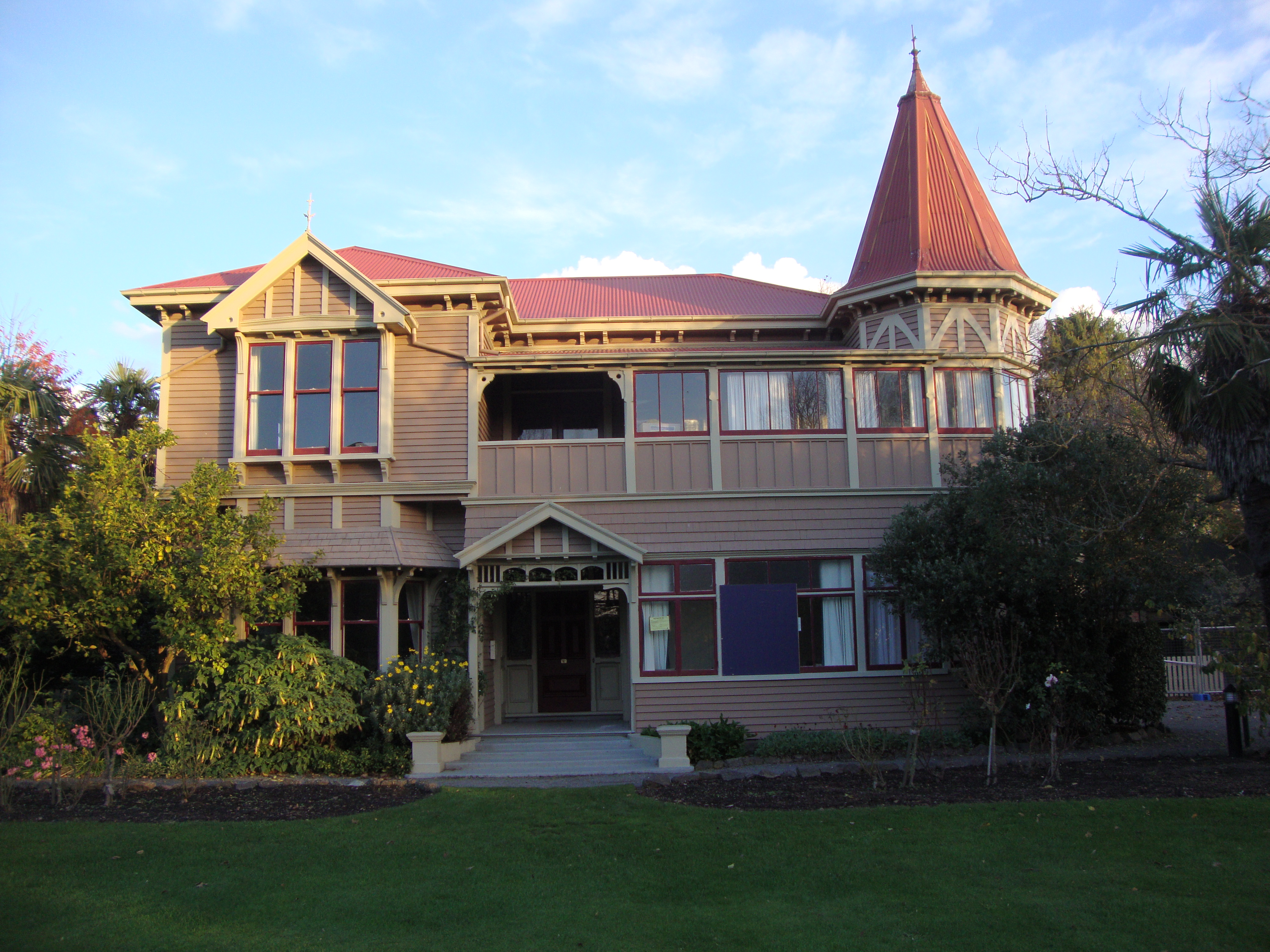
Avebury House in May 2011

In 1871, James Flesher's father William (born 1837) bought a 25 acres (100,000 m^{2}) site of the Avebury farm from Dr John Seager Gundry for £500. Flesher senior commissioned Avebury House from architect James Glanville. The 4,289 m^{2} dwelling was completed in 1885, replacing an earlier house from 1873. William Flesher died suddenly on the steamship SS Tarawera on a passage from Melbourne to Lyttelton, and James Flesher inherited Avebury house.

After James Flesher's death, the house was in turn passed to his son Hubert de Rie Flesher, who sold the building and 8 acres (32,000 m^{2}) of land to the Crown in 1945, and it was on-sold to Christchurch City Council. The house became the Cora Wilding Youth Hostel in 1965 and the land became a public reserve (Avebury Park). After a threat of demolition in 1997, the house was renovated. It was opened in 2002 by Prime Minister Helen Clark and serves as the Avebury House Community Centre.

Avebury House and Avebury Park are located in Eveleyn Couzins Avenue in Richmond, Christchurch. Flesher Avenue, off Eveleyn Couzins Avenue, is named after the Flesher family. Both roads occupy land that was previously part of the Avebury House property.

== Death ==
Flesher died on 18 August 1930 at Avebury House following a long illness. Like his father, he was buried at the Anglican cemetery of Holy Trinity Avonside. He was survived by his wife and his two children.

Political offices
Preceded by Henry Thacker	Mayor of Christchurch; 1923–1925	Succeeded by John Archer
