= Robert Macfarlane (New Zealand politician) =

New Zealand politician (1900–1981)

The Honourable Sir Robert Macfarlane KCMG
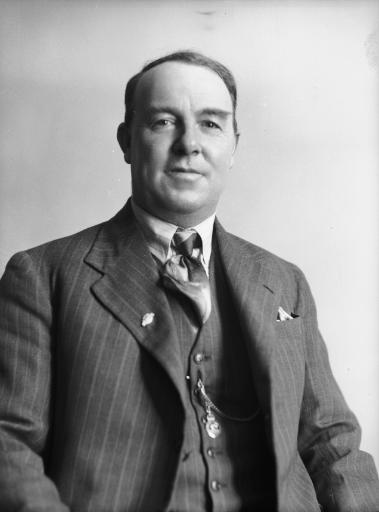
- Robert Macfarlane in ca 1951

14th Speaker of the House of Representatives
- In office 21 January 1958 – 28 October 1960
- Prime Minister: Walter Nash
- Preceded by: Matthew Oram
- Succeeded by: Ronald Algie

37th Mayor of Christchurch
- In office 18 November 1950 – 17 May 1958
- Preceded by: Ernest Andrews
- Succeeded by: George Manning
- In office 11 May 1938 – 17 May 1941
- Preceded by: John Beanland
- Succeeded by: Ernest Andrews

Member of the New Zealand Parliament for Christchurch Central
- In office 27 November 1946 – 29 November 1969
- Preceded by: new electorate
- Succeeded by: Bruce Barclay

Member of the New Zealand Parliament for Christchurch South
- In office 3 June 1939 – 27 November 1946
- Preceded by: Ted Howard
- Succeeded by: electorate abolished

Personal details
- Born: Robert Mafeking Haynes; 17 May 1900 Christchurch, New Zealand
- Died: 2 December 1981 (aged 81) Christchurch, New Zealand
- Party: Labour
- Spouse: Louisa Jacobs (m. 1932)
- Children: 2

Sir Robert Mafeking Macfarlane KCMG (né Haynes, 17 May 1900 – 2 December 1981) was a New Zealand politician of the Labour Party. He was a Member of Parliament, served as Speaker of the House of Representatives and was a Mayor of Christchurch.

== Early life ==
Macfarlane was born in Christchurch on 17 May 1900, the son of Emma Rose King Haynes. Born during the Second Boer War, his mother gave him the middle name Mafeking from a town in South Africa that was under siege at the time of his birth. In 1904, he took the surname Macfarlane after his mother married Hugh Macfarlane, a labourer.

He married Louisa Jacobs in 1932 with whom he had two daughters.

== Local body politics ==
Macfarlane was on the Christchurch City Council (1927–1929, 1936–1941, 1947–1959, and 1961–1981), and was Mayor of Christchurch twice, from 1938 to 1941 and from 1950 to 1958. He was at various times a member of the Lyttelton Harbour Board.

== Member of Parliament ==
New Zealand Parliament
Years	Term	Electorate	Party
1939–1943	26th	Christchurch South	Labour
1943–1946	27th	Christchurch South	Labour
1946–1949	28th	Christchurch Central	Labour
1949–1951	29th	Christchurch Central	Labour
1951–1954	30th	Christchurch Central	Labour
1954–1957	31st	Christchurch Central	Labour
1957–1960	32nd	Christchurch Central	Labour
1960–1963	33rd	Christchurch Central	Labour
1963–1966	34th	Christchurch Central	Labour
1966–1969	35th	Christchurch Central	Labour

Macfarlane entered Parliament in 1939 following a by-election, replacing Ted Howard (although Howard's daughter Mabel Howard had hoped to replace him following his death). He was the Member of Parliament for Christchurch South from 1939 to 1946, then for Christchurch Central from 1946 to 1969, when he retired.

From May 1947 until September 1947 he was the Labour Party's junior whip. He was subsequently Labour's senior whip from September 1947 until June 1951.

=== Speaker of the House of Representatives ===
He was the 14th Speaker of the House of Representatives during the Second Labour Government (1957–60). As the government held a working majority of one careful management was needed in the house to avoid the government losing a division. Macfarlane at times struggled with his hearing, which was known to be poor, which was further impeded when wearing the formal wig inside the chamber. Many MPs, particularly Keith Holyoake the Leader of the Opposition, would take advantage of this and would challenge, ignore and defy his rulings. Regardless a vote was never lost and later Labour leader Bill Rowling credited Macfarlane's use of 'common sense rather than the rule book' with enabling the government to survive its full term in office.

Macfarlane was given the job of speaker after failing to be elected to cabinet. He had wanted to be Minister of Internal Affairs.

Under Arnold Nordmeyer, and more particularly, Norman Kirk Labour wanted to modernise itself and Macfarlane was among several MPs who became increasingly pressured to retire. In defiance of this he was re-nominated again by local members for the 1966 general election and his nomination was queried by head office. He was allowed to stand again on the stipulation that he would not stand at the 1969 general election.

== Honours and awards ==
In 1953, McCormack was awarded the Queen Elizabeth II Coronation Medal. In the 1954 Queen's Birthday Honours, he was appointed a Companion of the Order of St Michael and St George, and in the 1974 New Year Honours he was elevated to Knight Commander of the same order. In the 1985 New Year Honours, his wife, Louisa, Lady Macfarlane, was appointed a Companion of the Queen's Service Order for community service.

== Military service ==
In World War II he served in the Middle East in the ASC of the 2nd New Zealand Expeditionary Force for 2½ years.

== Notes ==
New Zealand Parliament
Preceded by Ted Howard	Member of Parliament for Christchurch South; 1939–1946	Constituency abolished
New constituency	Member of Parliament for Christchurch Central; 1946–1969	Succeeded by Bruce Barclay
Political offices
Preceded by John Beanland	Mayor of Christchurch; 1938–1941 1950–1958	Succeeded by Ernest Andrews
Preceded by Ernest Andrews	Mayor of Christchurch; 1938–1941 1950–1958	Succeeded by George Manning
Preceded by Matthew Oram	Speaker of the New Zealand House of Representatives; 1958–1960	Succeeded by Ronald Algie
Preceded by Harold Smith	Deputy-Mayor of Christchurch; 1971–1974	Succeeded by Peter Skellerup
Party political offices
Preceded by Arthur Shapton Richards	Senior Whip of the Labour Party; 1947–1951	Succeeded by Phil Connolly
