= Dan Sullivan (New Zealand politician) =

New Zealand politician

The Honourable Dan Sullivan
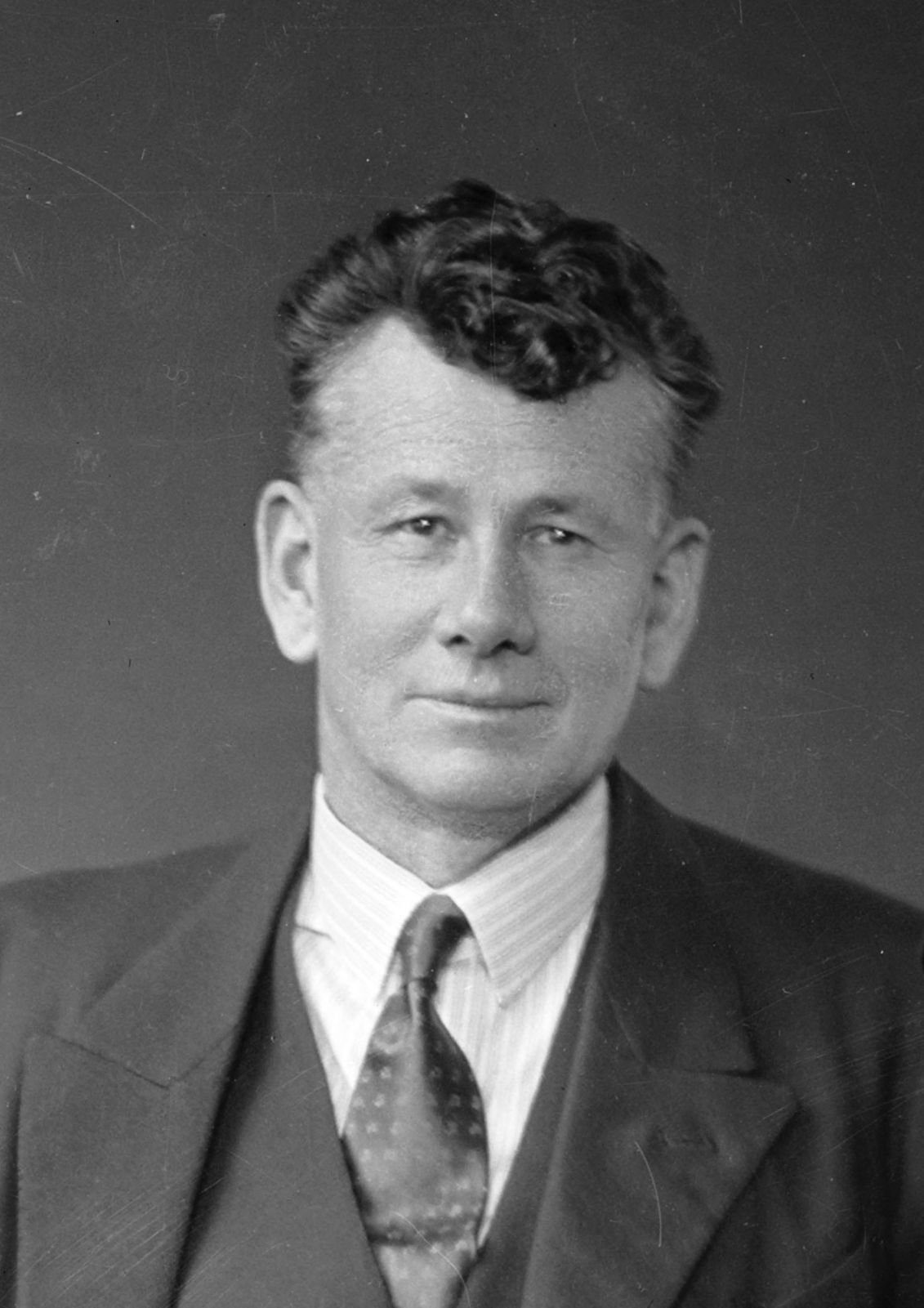
- Sullivan in 1941

15th Minister of Industries and Commerce
- In office 6 December 1935 – 8 April 1947
- Prime Minister: Michael Joseph Savage; Peter Fraser
- Preceded by: Robert Masters
- Succeeded by: Arnold Nordmeyer

4th Minister for Scientific and Industrial Research
- In office 6 December 1935 – 8 April 1947
- Prime Minister: Michael Joseph Savage; Peter Fraser
- Preceded by: George Forbes
- Succeeded by: Arnold Nordmeyer

13th Minister of Railways
- In office 6 December 1935 – 12 December 1941
- Prime Minister: Michael Joseph Savage; Peter Fraser
- Preceded by: George Forbes
- Succeeded by: Bob Semple

35th Mayor of Christchurch
- In office 13 May 1931 – 14 February 1936
- Preceded by: John Archer
- Succeeded by: John Beanland

Member of the New Zealand Parliament for Avon
- In office 17 December 1919 – 8 April 1947
- Preceded by: George Russell
- Succeeded by: John Mathison

Personal details
- Born: 18 July 1882 Waltham
- Died: 8 April 1947 (aged 64) Lewisham Hospital, Wellington
- Party: Labour
- Children: 2
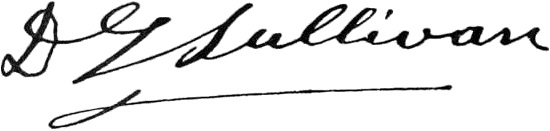
- Signature

Daniel Giles Sullivan (18 July 1882 – 8 April 1947) was a New Zealand Member of Parliament, Cabinet Minister and Mayor of Christchurch.

== Biography ==
=== Early life and career ===
Sullivan was born in Waltham, Christchurch on 18 July 1882. His parents were the Irish-born labourer and carter Florance (Flurence) Sullivan and Mary Dow who was from Scotland. The Sullivans were a large family and rather poor, resulting in Sullivan selling newspapers to financially assist his family. Due to this, his formal education was cut short at age 11 but not before passing proficiency. Regardless, he continued to self-educate and voraciously read on a wide range of topics, but particularly biographies and social history. He was particularly influenced by the ideas of German land nationalisation advocate Michael Flürscheim, but also closely read Henry George and Karl Marx.

After one year working in a market garden he then became an apprentice french polisher. Sullivan joined the trade union movement following the influence of a foreman who was active in the Christchurch United Furniture Trades Union (CUFTU). Aged 16 he became secretary of the committee organising the union's annual picnic (his first elected office) and briefly was a delegate of the union to the Canterbury Trades and Labour Council. He travelled to London in 1900 after completing his apprenticeship. His trip was made under the guise of improving his techniques as a polisher, but he also visited places he had read about and wished to learn more about trade unions. Along the way Sullivan sold furniture that he had hand made himself door to door across Australia to help fund his trip to Britain.

Upon arriving in Britain he was shocked by the levels of poverty he witnessed (at one stage himself reduced to sleeping outside on the Thames Embankment). Sullivan would later maintain that a determination to prevent the kind of poverty he had witnessed abroad strongly influenced his political career as was an aim to emulate the dedication of British trade unionists that he had met. In addition to Britain he visited Northern Ireland, working for a time in the Belfast shipyards, and North America as well before returning to Christchurch after four years. He resumed his union activities upon his return and was to hold many positions in the union movement over the succeeding years. He became both the president and secretary of the CUFTU, French Polishers' Union and New Zealand Federated Furniture Trade Union. He was first vice president, from 1908 to 1910, and president, in 1911, of the Canterbury Trades and Labour Council. He was a member of the Dominion executive of the Trades and Labour Councils' Federation and in 1914, he was elected president of the United Federation of Labour. Through his experiences he became consummate at arguing cases under the industrial conciliation and arbitration system.

In 1912 he began writing for the Lyttelton Times on matters of labour issues. He expanded his newspaper contributions and became a journalist between 1915 and 1920 with the Christchurch Sun and published "Dan Sullivan's Magazine" in 1919. He contributed to the founding of the Christchurch Journalists' Union. He also became a regular speaker on weekends in Cathedral Square, giving him a higher profile and cementing his position as a moderate in the labour movement, both in his approach and positions. He favoured the industrial arbitration system over strike action and advocated for state ownership as a means to improve business and living conditions.

=== Political career ===
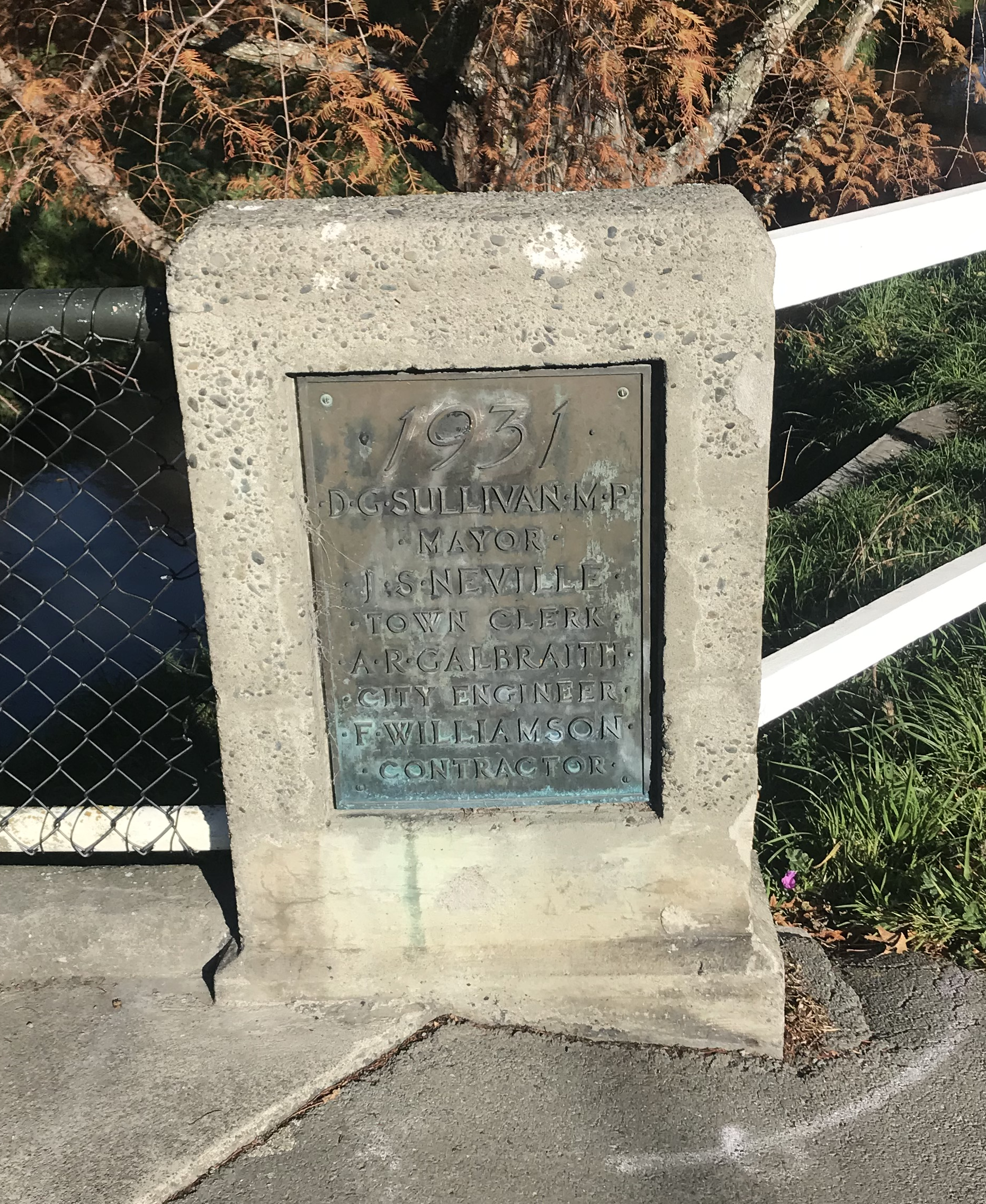
Fairview Street Bridge, built in 1931 during Sullivan's mayoralty

During the 1905 election campaign, Sullivan heard a speech by Jim Thorn inspiring to join the Independent Political Labour League (IPLL). By the next election in 1908, he was the president of the IPLL and stood as their candidate for the Avon seat. He came fourth out of five candidates in the first ballot. The 1908 election was won by George Russell, who would later become a cabinet minister, and was in 1912 considered a possible successor of Joseph Ward as leader of the Liberal Party. Sullivan joined the New Zealand Labour Party, which superseded the IPLL in 1910, and stood as its candidate for the Riccarton electorate in 1911. A year later, Sullivan was appointed secretary of the first of the Labour Unity Conferences that would form the moderate United Labour Party (ULP). He was later part of the faction of the ULP that joined the Social Democratic Party (SDP) after the second of the unity conferences. He then served as a member of the Christchurch strike committee during the Great Strike of 1913. In 1914, he contested Avon again as the SDP candidate but was again unsuccessful. During World War I he opposed conscription though he served on the executive of the Christchurch Patriotic Committee and on the local Citizens' Defence Corps.

He was a member of the Christchurch City Council between 1915 and 1923, when he unsuccessfully stood for the mayoralty. He was a member again from 1925 to 1931 and during the 1927–29 term was deputy mayor. A popular candidate, he topped the poll in four elections. He was chair of the council's housing committee, where he formulated a scheme to allocate funds from the council to be lent to prospective homeowners' mortgages. From 1927 to 1930, he chaired the finance committee. In 1931, he was elected Mayor of Christchurch on his second attempt. As mayor, Sullivan dedicated his time to alleviating poverty in Christchurch during the depression as well as maintaining order. Nevertheless, violent unrest occurred, which peaked during the 1932 Christchurch tramway strike, which Sullivan struggled to resolve. He networked widely in order to raise money for a relief fund to ease peoples' distress. He interviewed thousands of constituents and would frequently help them on a personal level. When Labour won the 1935 general election and Sullivan took on the heavy workload of a cabinet minister, he reluctantly resigned from the mayoralty in February 1936. He was succeeded as mayor by John Beanland of the Citizens' Association.

=== Member of Parliament ===
New Zealand Parliament
Years	Term	Electorate	Party
1919–1922	20th	Avon	Labour
1922–1925	21st	Avon	Labour
1925–1928	22nd	Avon	Labour
1928–1931	23rd	Avon	Labour
1931–1935	24th	Avon	Labour
1935–1938	25th	Avon	Labour
1938–1943	26th	Avon	Labour
1943–1946	27th	Avon	Labour
1946–1947	28th	Avon	Labour

In the 1919 election, the incumbent, George Russell suffered a crushing defeat by Sullivan. As Minister of Public Health, Russell was held responsible by large parts of the population for New Zealand's unpreparedness for the 1918 flu epidemic. Compared to the 1914 election, Sullivan's share of the vote increased by more than 27 percentage points. He represented the Avon electorate in the House of Representatives for 28 years from 1919 to 1947. From 1921 to 1935, he was Labour's senior whip. During the 1920s, Sullivan and James McCombs led the opposition to Harry Holland within the Parliamentary Labour Party caucus. In 1923, he unsuccessfully challenged Holland for the leadership himself, and stood for the deputy leadership subsequently as well, but lost to Michael Joseph Savage 11 votes to 16.

In 1935, Sullivan was awarded the King George V Silver Jubilee Medal.

Sullivan was a leading Cabinet Minister in the First Labour Government of New Zealand. He was appointed by Prime Minister Michael Joseph Savage as the Minister of Industries and Commerce between 1935 and 1947, Minister of Railways from 1935 to 1941 and was later the high-profile wartime Minister of Supply and Munitions. Sullivan had always been a vocal advocate for expanding manufacturing in New Zealand and his role as Minister of Industries and Commerce allowed him to put his ideas into practice. He encouraged the development of new industries but was often frustrated by limited progress. He also oversaw exchange controls particularly due to wartime shortages, but this opened new opportunities to develop a broader range of manufacturing industry in New Zealand, which Sullivan enthusiastically took advantage of.

He was ranked fourth in the cabinet until Savage's death in 1940. With the leadership vacant, Sullivan gave serious consideration to standing to succeed Savage as leader, but eventually decided to support the deputy leader Peter Fraser. Afterwards he was ranked third in the cabinet. As a result of his ranking, he was Acting Prime Minister from April to July 1944 while Fraser and Walter Nash were overseas. He carried a "punishing workload" during the war, which almost certainly contributed to his health declining from the mid-1940s.

=== Death and commemoration ===
Sullivan died in Wellington of coronary disease on 8 April 1947. His body was taken to Christchurch and lay in state in the Civic Theatre visited by crowds of thousands, and a large crowd attended his funeral.

Sullivan Avenue in the Christchurch suburb of Woolston was named in Sullivan's honour in 1929. Sullivan Park in Avonside was named for him in 1948.

== Personal life ==
He married Daisy Ethel Webster on 23 November 1905. Despite Sullivan being a staunch Roman Catholic, the pair were married in Merivale at the Anglican Church of St Mary. His wife, son and daughter survived him. He was described as a "clever attractive and ambitious man".

== Sources ==
- Gustafson, Barry (1980). Labour's path to political independence: The Origins and Establishment of the New Zealand Labour Party, 1900–19. Auckland, New Zealand: Auckland University Press. ISBN 0-19-647986-X.
- Gustafson, Barry (1986). From the Cradle to the Grave: a biography of Michael Joseph Savage. Auckland: Reed Methuen. ISBN 0-474-00138-5. (page 298 of biographical appendix)
- Mansfield, F. W. (1909). The General Election, 1908. National Library.
- Wilson, Jim (1985) [First ed. published 1913]. New Zealand Parliamentary Record, 1840–1984 (4th ed.). Wellington: V.R. Ward, Govt. Printer. OCLC 154283103.

New Zealand Parliament
Preceded by George Russell	Member of Parliament for Avon; 1919–1947	Succeeded by John Mathison
Party political offices
Preceded by James McCombs	Senior Whip of the Labour Party; 1921–1935	Succeeded by Bill Jordan
Political offices
Preceded by Charles Agar	Deputy Mayor of Christchurch; 1927–1929	Succeeded by Henry Thacker
Preceded by John Archer	Mayor of Christchurch; 1931–1936	Succeeded by John Beanland
Preceded by George Forbes	Minister of Railways; 1935–1941	Succeeded by Bob Semple
Preceded by George Forbes	Minister for Scientific and Industrial Research; 1935–1947	Succeeded by Arnold Nordmeyer
Preceded by Robert Masters	Minister of Industries and Commerce; 1935–1947	Succeeded by Arnold Nordmeyer
