= John Archer (New Zealand politician) =

New Zealand politician (1865–1949)

The Reverend and Honourable John Archer
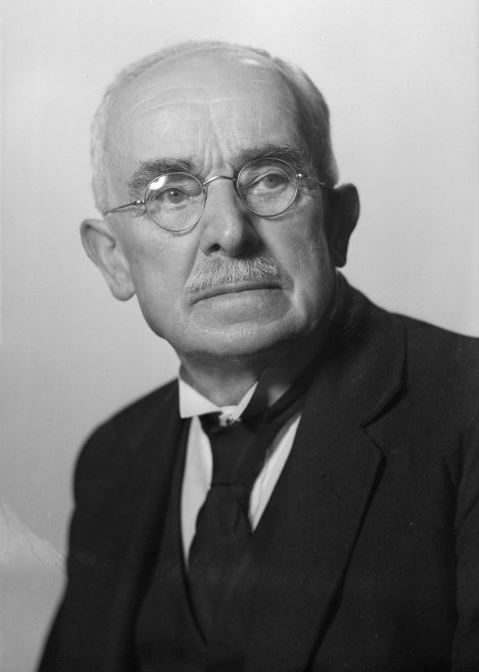
- Archer in 1922

34th Mayor of Christchurch
- In office 1925–1931
- Preceded by: James Flesher
- Succeeded by: Dan Sullivan

Member of the New Zealand Legislative Council
- In office 1937–1949
- Appointed by: Michael Joseph Savage

8th President of the Labour Party
- In office 12 April 1928 – 3 April 1929
- Vice President: Jim Thorn
- Leader: Harry Holland
- Preceded by: Bob Semple
- Succeeded by: Jim Thorn

Personal details
- Born: 3 March 1865 Thornton, Leicestershire, England
- Died: 25 July 1949 (aged 84) Christchurch, New Zealand
- Party: Labour (from 1916)
- Other political affiliations: Social Democratic Party (1913–1916)
- Spouse: Phoebe Elizabeth Gee (m. 1894)
- Children: 2
- Occupation: Baptist minister

John Kendrick Archer (3 March 1865 – 25 July 1949) was a Baptist Minister, Mayor of Christchurch and member of the New Zealand Legislative Council.

== Early life ==
Archer was born in Leicestershire, England on 3 March 1865, the son of Mary Kendrick and her husband, Thomas Archer, a master butcher. John was raised as a Methodist and educated at Market Bosworth Grammar School, Leicestershire, and University College Nottingham. From 1888 to 1891 he attended Midland Baptist College, Nottingham.

In 1901 he made a tentative entry into public life, being elected to the board of Hebden Bridge Grammar School. He was a poor law guardian at Grimsby from 1907 to 1908.

He married Phoebe Elizabeth Gee on 10 July 1894 at the Baptist chapel, Peterborough, Northamptonshire and they had two sons. Rev Archer and his family came to New Zealand in 1908.

== Baptist church involvement ==
After his ordination in 1891 he served in the north of England as pastor at Peterborough (1891–1895), Heptonstall Slack (1895–1903) and Grimsby (1903–1908). When Archer and his family moved to New Zealand in 1908, he became minister of the Baptist Church, Napier until 1913 and serving as chairman of the Main School Committee and the local Technical Education Board. Subsequently, he was minister at Esk Street, Invercargill (1913–1916), and Vivian Street, Wellington (1916–1919). He also served for part of that time as a military chaplain at Tauherenikau Camp, near Featherston. From 1919 until 1932 he was minister of the Baptist Church in Sydenham, Christchurch. After his retirement in 1932 he remained active in the church, serving as president of the Canterbury Auxiliary of the Baptist Union, organising a Sunday school in Christchurch and helping to start a Baptist church at Greymouth.

He was President of the Baptist Union of New Zealand between 1916 and 1918 and Foundation President of the Invercargill WEA (Workers Educational Association) in 1915.

== Political career ==
=== Local body ===
In 1914 he was transferred to Invercargill and, while there, spent 12 months on the borough council. He was a Councillor for Invercargill Borough in 1915–1916. He next went to Wellington, leaving there for the Trentham Military Camp where he served as a chaplain until the end of the war. He served as a Councillor for Christchurch City Council from 1921 to 1925 and from 1931 to 1935. He was Mayor of Christchurch from 1925 to 1931. He was also a top-polling candidate for the North Canterbury Hospital Board and served on the Christchurch Tramway Board and Christchurch Fire Board.

=== Labour Party ===
Archer was not only a prominent leader in the Baptist church but also gave long and influential service to the early New Zealand Labour Party. Prior to its formation in 1916 he was an active advocate of such a party. In 1910 at Napier he delivered six evening lectures on socialism, and in 1913 he was editor of the United Labour Leader.

Following the July 1913 unity congress he joined the new Social Democratic Party, which was absorbed into the Labour Party in 1916. Archer stood unsuccessfully as Labour candidate for the House of Representatives four times: in Invercargill (1919), Christchurch North (1922 and 1928), and Kaiapoi (1931). He was President of the New Zealand Labour Party in 1928–1929, and its Vice-president 1922–1925, 1927–1928 and 1929–1931.

In 1935, he was awarded the King George V Silver Jubilee Medal.

=== Legislative Council ===
He was a member of the New Zealand Legislative Council 1937–1949.

== Death ==
Described as 'a man of war from his youth up', Archer was a blunt, some suggested abrasive, man. Certainly, he was not one to compromise his principles or the message which he believed had been entrusted to him by God. His preaching and actions reflected the moral righteousness and millennialism of British puritanism and the urgent and total commitment to social change of the Old Testament prophets such as Isaiah and Amos. Nonconformist in religion and politics, he argued that 'faith without works is dead' and that imperfect human relationships arose out of economic and social injustice caused by sin, which he defined as selfishness and the worship of material self-interest. To Archer there was no conflict between his political and religious activities; both were the same sacred vocation.

In 1944 the Archers celebrated their golden wedding. In 1949 ill-health forced Archer to retire from the Legislative Council. Rev Archer died in Christchurch on 25 July 1949. He was survived by his wife, Phoebe, and two sons.

Phoebe Elizabeth Archer, 87, died on 13 November 1953. The Baptist Union bought the couple's home at 166 Colombo Street and obtained a pound for pound subsidy from the Government with the intention that this should become 'a home for aged Baptists of the Canterbury-Westland Auxiliary Area'. Eventually the property was vested in the Baptist Union of New Zealand and the emphasis on the residents being Baptists removed. Instead the home would provide the residents with 'a maximum of individuality' and 'comfort and Christian fellowship for their declining years'. The institution was named in John and Phoebe's honour 'as an expression of thanksgiving to Almighty God for the outstanding and devoted service of the late Rev. and Mrs. J. K. Archer and as a permanent memorial'.

One of the Archers' sons, Kendrick Gee, was born at Heptonstall in the historic county of the West Riding, Yorkshire. He was educated at Napier and at Southland Boys' High School. In 1914 the Royal Humane Society awarded him its bronze medal and he graduated with an LL.B. from Canterbury University College, before practising as a barrister and solicitor in Christchurch.

Political offices
Preceded by James Arthur Flesher	Mayor of Christchurch; 1925–1931	Succeeded by Dan Sullivan
Party political offices
Preceded by Bob Semple	President of the Labour Party; 1928–1929	Succeeded by Jim Thorn
