= Ernest Andrews (politician) =

New Zealand mayor (1873–1961)

Sir Ernest Andrews CBE
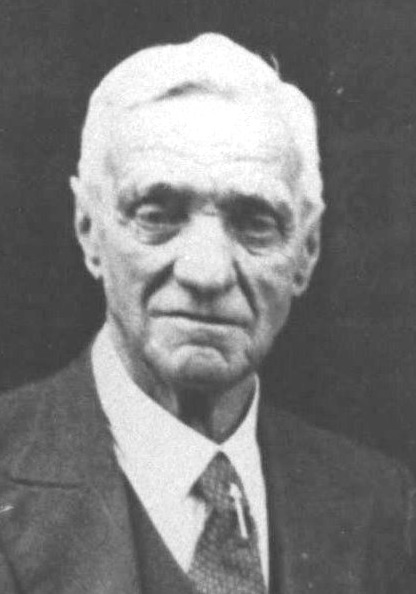
- Andrews c. 1944

38th Mayor of Christchurch
- In office 28 May 1941 – 1950
- Preceded by: Robert Macfarlane
- Succeeded by: Robert Macfarlane

Personal details
- Born: 25 June 1873 Brightwater, New Zealand
- Died: 9 November 1961 (aged 88) Christchurch, New Zealand
- Resting place: Bromley Cemetery
- Spouse(s): Caroline Maria Couzins (1872 – 27 December 1937); Florence May Emmett
- Relations: Eveleyn Charlotte Couzins (1896–1945) (first wife's niece)
- Children: Alpha Herbert (b 1901); Pelham Winter (b 1904); Gwendoline Cynthia (b 1909)
- Education: Canterbury University College

Sir Ernest Herbert Andrews CBE (25 June 1873 – 9 November 1961) was a New Zealand teacher, printer and cricketer and local-body politician. He was on the Christchurch City Council from 1919 and Mayor of Christchurch from 1941 until his retirement in 1950.

== Early life and family ==
Andrews was born in Brightwater near Nelson in 1873. His father was Thomas Andrews, who had come to New Zealand in 1842 and died in 1905. He received his education at Canterbury University College.

Andrews married Caroline Maria Couzins (born 5 August 1872) on 14 March 1900. They had three children: Alpha Herbert (1901–2002), Pelham Winter (1904–1998) and Gwendoline Cynthia (1909–1999). Eveleyn Charlotte Couzins (1896–1945) was his first wife's niece.

After university, Andrews was a teacher; he passed his teachers' examinations in early 1896. In his initial placement, he was a teacher aid at Kaituna on Banks Peninsula. He taught at Heretaunga School in Hastings from late 1896 until March 1899 and then at Riwaka School in the Tasman District until February 1907. He moved to Christchurch and founded a printing firm, Andrews and Sando. His business partner was his cousin Archibald Sando, whose mother was a sister of Thomas Andrews. The business partnership was dissolved in 1908 and Sando became manager of the Wellington Publishing Company, which owned The Dominion newspaper.

Andrews played representative cricket from 1890 to 1907. In 1892, he was a founding member of the Ashburton Union Cricket Club and he became the inaugural secretary. While in Hastings, he played for the Hawke's Bay County Cricket Club. He was then a member of the Riwaka Cricket Club. Later, he played for the Canterbury Druids.

== Political career ==
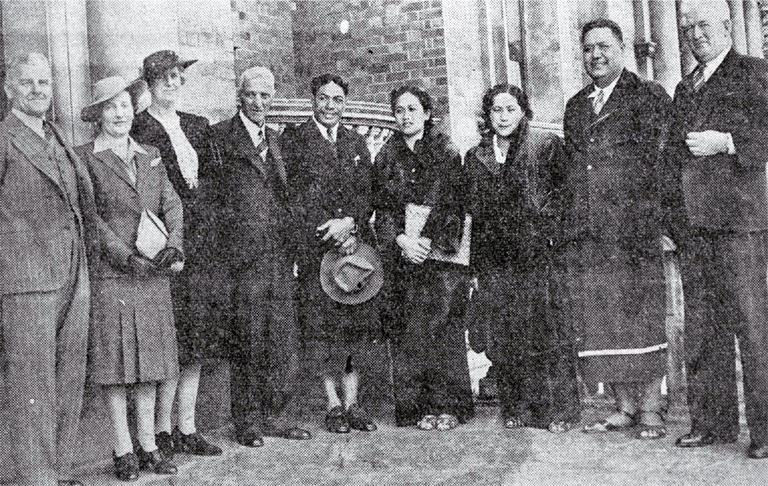
Samoan high chiefs Tupua Tamasese Meaʻole (fifth from left) and Malietoa Tanumafili II (second from right) welcomed to Christchurch in 1945 by Mayor Ernest Andrews (fourth from left) and Deputy-Mayor Melville Lyons (right)

In August 1910, Andrews stood for election for the North Canterbury Education Board in the central ward, but was beaten by Dr. Charles James Russell. In April 1911, he was elected onto the school committee of St Albans School, for which he became secretary. In August 1912, Andrews was successful in standing for the North Canterbury Education Board.

Andrews was elected as councillor onto Christchurch City Council in 1919. He was reported to be under consideration as a possible candidate for the Citizens' Association for the 1929 mayoralty, but he was not chosen. In 1941, he was elected as mayor, a position that he held for three terms until his retirement in 1950. He provided continuous service to Christchurch City Council for 31 years.

Andrews' first wife died in 1937, before he became mayor, and so his niece, Eveleyn Couzins, acted as the mayoress from 1941 until her death in 1945. Couzins made a valued contribution to the community, especially through the organisation of parcels for dispatch to New Zealand servicemen abroad. Although she had suffered from some minor illnesses, she continued to carry out her duties as mayoress until she became seriously ill, two weeks before her death in June 1945. She is buried in B24P188 in Linwood Cemetery. Andrews' daughter Gwendoline then took over the role of mayoress.

Andrews was appointed a Commander of the Order of the British Empire for social welfare and patriotic services in the 1946 New Year Honours, and a Knight Bachelor in the 1950 King's Birthday Honours, the first Christchurch serving mayor to be so honoured. He retired in October 1950, having had been mayor for longer than any other incumbent up to that time.

== Later life ==
Andrews died in Christchurch on 9 November 1961. The funeral service took place at the Rugby Street Methodist church, with which Andrews had been long associated. He is buried at Bromley Cemetery, with his first wife. The simple Andrews grave states that Caroline Andrews lived from 1872 to 1937 and Ernest Andrews from 1873 to 1961.

He was survived by his second wife, Florence May Emmett.

== Honorific eponym ==
Andrews Crescent in the suburb of Spreydon is named in his honour.

== Notes ==
Political offices
Preceded by Robert Macfarlane	Mayor of Christchurch; 1941–1950	Succeeded by Robert Macfarlane
