= Christchurch Citizens' Association =

- Founded: 1911
- Dissolved: 1989
- Ideology: Fiscal conservatism Nonpartisanism; Localism
- Political position: Centre-right
- Colours: Blue & White

The Christchurch Citizens' Association, succeeded by the United Citizens' Association, was a centre-right leaning local body electoral ticket in Christchurch, New Zealand. It was formed in 1911 by the local chamber of commerce. Its main ambitions were to continue to control the Christchurch City Council, reduce local spending and deny left-leaning Labour Party candidates being elected.

== History ==
The Citizens' Association was founded in 1911 at a meeting at the chamber of commerce. The meeting was chaired by Dryden Hall, a son of a former premier, Sir John Hall, and set about selecting candidates for the upcoming municipal elections. It followed newspaper editorials bemoaning the activities of Labour candidates "...to capture a majority of the seats, so as to run the government of the city on Socialistic lines." At the 1911 election the Association achieved its aim of preventing a Labour majority, it also saw a considerable Labour advance with five Labour councillors elected and Labour's supported mayoral candidate, Tommy Taylor, successful.

In a study of the Citizens' Association, David Hyslop found that Citizens' candidates were mostly professional and business people with its candidates largely drawn from among middle-aged, well-to-do, professional businessmen. The Citizens' Association claimed to possess an "anti-party" ideology with a desire to 'keep politics out of local government' as an attack line against Labour. Critics of this stance pointed out that Citizens' Association was a disguise for National Party supporters to camouflage their party members involvement in local government. Many National Party members and parliamentary candidates were active in the Citizens' Association such as Ron Guthrey, Helen Garrett, John Burn and Morgan Fahey.

In early 1989 with impending local-body amalgamations looming, the Citizens Association joined with the Waimairi Independence Team to create the new United Citizens Association in March 1989 headed by Christchurch mayor Sir Hamish Hay and Chair of the Waimairi District Council Margaret Murray. A deal was made for a ticket of Hay for the mayoralty and Murray to be deputy but the deal came under strain by July 1989. It ultimately caused a split with Murray standing for mayor herself claiming the deal for her to be nominated for the deputy mayoralty was reneged. Murray launched her own rival ticket, Christchurch Action, in August 1989. Soon after Hay, withdrew from the election citing ill-health. Doctor Morgan Fahey was chosen to replace him to contest the mayoralty and lead the ticket.
