= Skellerup (disambiguation) =

Skellerup is a New Zealand-based manufacturer of industrial and agricultural rubber products. Skellerup may also refer to:

== People ==
- George Skellerup (1881–1955), New Zealand industrialist
- Peter Skellerup (1918–2006), New Zealand industrialist
- Valdemar Skellerup (1907–1982), New Zealand industrialist

== Places ==
- Skellerup, Denmark, village
- Skellerup Glacier, glacier in Oates Land, Antarctica

== See also ==
- Skjellerup, Danish surname
