= 1965 Christchurch mayoral election =

New Zealand mayoral election

← 1962	9 October 1965	1968 →
- Turnout: 27,480 (32.00%)
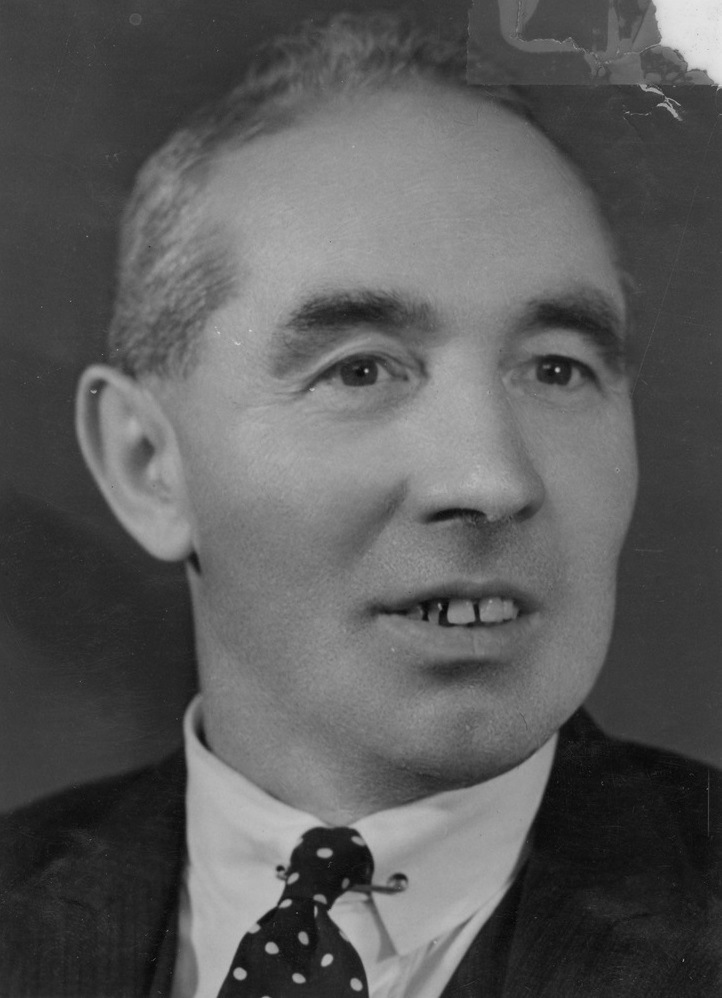

Candidate	George Manning	Peter Skellerup
Party	Labour	Citizens'
Popular vote	17,163	9,220
Percentage	62.45	33.55
Mayor before election
George Manning
Elected mayor
George Manning

The 1965 Christchurch mayoral election was part of the New Zealand local elections held that same year. In 1965, election were held for the Mayor of Christchurch plus other local government positions. The polling was conducted using the standard first-past-the-post electoral method.

== Background ==
Sitting mayor George Manning was re-elected for a fourth time, defeating his main opponent councillor Peter Skellerup of the Citizens' Association and two other candidates. Labour gained an extra seat on the city council, but lost it after special votes were counted. This left the composition of the council at seven seats to twelve in favour of the Citizens' Association.

== Mayoralty results ==
The following table gives the election results:

1965 Christchurch mayoral election
Party	Candidate	Votes	%	±%
Labour	George Manning	17,163	62.45	−3.89
Citizens'	Peter Skellerup	9,220	33.55	
Independent	Tommy Armstrong	530	1.92	
Workers' Action	John Sturt	464	1.68	
Informal votes		103	0.37	−0.90
Majority		7,943	28.90	−4.21
Turnout		27,480	32.00	−7.50

== Councillor results ==
1965 Christchurch local election
Party	Candidate	Votes	%	±%
Citizens'	Ron Guthrey	16,486	59.99	+3.70
Citizens'	Peter Skellerup	14,681	53.42	+0.98
Labour	Reg Stillwell	14,552	52.95	+4.19
Labour	Neville Pickering	14,530	52.87	−1.22
Citizens'	Hamish Hay	14,365	52.27	−0.51
Labour	Robert Macfarlane	14,294	52.01	−0.05
Labour	Mabel Howard	13,489	49.08	−0.53
Citizens'	Les Amos	13,468	49.01	
Citizens'	Maurice Carter	13,260	48.25	−1.55
Citizens'	Bill Glue	12,886	46.89	−5.83
Labour	Lyn Christie	12,796	46.56	+0.88
Citizens'	Buster Cowles	12,311	44.79	
Labour	Harold Denton	11,975	43.57	−0.63
Citizens'	Harold Smith	11,718	42.64	−5.23
Citizens'	Alma Schumacher	11,716	42.63	−2.96
Labour	Bill Mathison	11,596	42.19	
Citizens'	Bruce Britten	11,565	42.08	
Citizens'	William Ernest Olds	11,521	41.92	−5.00
Citizens'	Gordon Hattaway	11,359	41.33	+1.48
Labour	Ted Adcock	11,272	41.01	−0.05
Citizens'	George Griffiths	11,120	40.46	−3.68
Citizens'	Gordon Alison Guy Connal	10,686	38.88	−4.45
Citizens'	Helen Garrett	10,574	38.47	
Citizens'	Reginald George Brown	10,118	36.81	−8.46
Citizens'	Geoffrey Leonard Bradbury	10,047	36.56	
Citizens'	George Ronald Burrowes	9,959	36.24	
Labour	Reg Jones	9,748	35.47	−4.38
Labour	Brian Alderdice	9,590	34.89	
Labour	Walter Baguley	9,503	34.58	
Labour	Reginald John Cunningham	9,441	34.35	
Labour	John F. Davidson	9,403	34.21	
Citizens'	Cyril Steel	9,328	33.94	
Labour	Kenneth Noel Larkin	8,732	31.77	
Labour	Milward James Mathews	8,487	30.88	−3.74
Labour	John A. Gregor	8,529	31.03	
Labour	Rex Laurence T. Sandford	8,176	29.75	−3.19
Labour	Stuart Laurence Lacey	7,812	28.42	
Independent	Tom Flint	7,577	27.57	−23.08
Labour	Patrick Neary	7,518	27.35	
Independent	Tommy Armstrong	5,212	18.96	−25.40
Workers' Action	John Sturt	2,710	9.86	
Liberal	Alexander Mackintosh	2,485	9.04	
Independent	Charles E. Cullen	2,437	8.86	+0.28
Liberal	Eric Lester May	2,175	7.91	
Liberal	James Herbert Moore	2,009	7.31	
Communist	Ralph C. Blacklock	1,504	5.47	
Communist	Jack Locke	1,481	5.38	−0.29
Independent	William John McFaul	1,285	4.67	−0.55
