= 1968 Christchurch mayoral election =

New Zealand mayoral election

← 1965	12 October 1968	1971 →
- Turnout: 36,446 (41.57%)
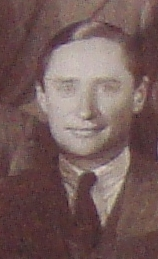

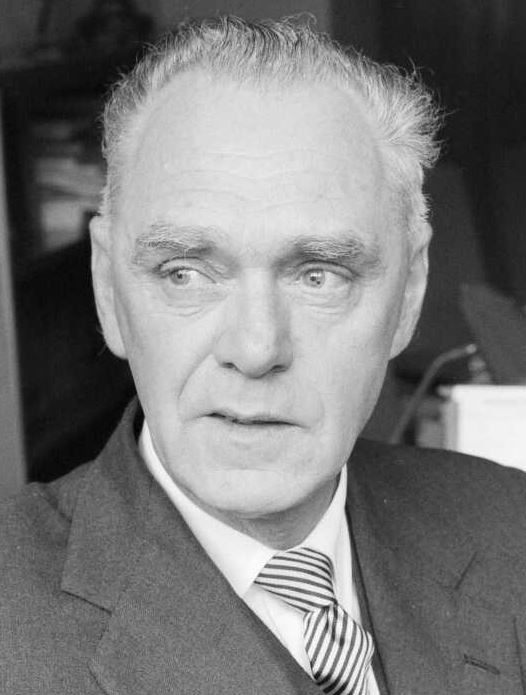
Candidate	Ron Guthrey	John Mathison
Party	Citizens'	Labour
Popular vote	23,273	12,910
Percentage	63.85	35.42
Mayor before election
George Manning
Elected mayor
Ron Guthrey

The 1968 Christchurch mayoral election was part of the New Zealand local elections held that same year. In 1968, election were held for the Mayor of Christchurch plus other local government positions. The polling was conducted using the standard first-past-the-post electoral method.

== Background ==
Sitting mayor George Manning retired leaving an open field to succeed him. The election saw councillor Ron Guthrey of the Citizens' Association defeat former Labour councillor and MP for Avon John Mathison. Labour lost ground on the city council as well, losing four seats leaving the composition of the council at three seats to sixteen in favour of the Citizens' Association.

== Mayoralty results ==
The following table gives the election results:

1968 Christchurch mayoral election
Party	Candidate	Votes	%	±%
Citizens'	Ron Guthrey	23,273	63.85	
Labour	John Mathison	12,910	35.42	
Informal votes		263	0.72	+0.35
Majority		10,363	28.43	
Turnout		36,446	41.57	+9.57

== Councillor results ==
1968 Christchurch local election
Party	Candidate	Votes	%	±%
Citizens'	Hamish Hay	22,831	62.64	+10.37
Citizens'	Peter Skellerup	21,057	57.77	+4.65
Labour	Neville Pickering	19,176	52.61	−0.26
Citizens'	Peter Dunbar	18,881	51.80	
Citizens'	Maurice Carter	18,912	51.89	+3.64
Citizens'	Les Amos	18,742	51.42	+2.41
Citizens'	Buster Cowles	18,684	51.26	+6.47
Labour	Reg Stillwell	18,018	49.43	−3.52
Citizens'	Gordon Hattaway	17,550	48.15	+6.82
Citizens'	Bruce Britten	17,525	48.08	+6.00
Citizens'	Helen Garrett	17,458	47.90	+9.43
Citizens'	Harold Smith	17,318	47.51	+4.87
Citizens'	Ted Taylor	17,115	46.95	
Citizens'	Harry Blazey	17,041	46.75	
Citizens'	Robertson Stewart	16,834	46.18	
Citizens'	Bill Glue	16,820	46.15	−0.74
Citizens'	George Griffiths	16,702	45.82	+5.36
Citizens'	Peter Blaxall	16,469	45.18	
Labour	Robert Macfarlane	16,390	44.97	−7.04
Citizens'	Bruce Dallas	16,373	44.92	
Citizens'	Mina Elisabeth Lawrie	16,101	44.17	
Citizens'	Arthur McGregor	15,560	42.69	
Labour	Lyn Christie	15,250	41.84	−4.72
Labour	Harold Denton	15,081	41.37	−2.20
Labour	Bill Mathison	14,919	40.93	−1.26
Labour	Brian Alderdice	14,534	39.87	+4.98
Labour	Reg Jones	13,281	36.44	+0.97
Labour	Thomas Henry Boyle	13,238	36.32	
Labour	Reginald John Cunningham	12,675	34.77	+0.42
Labour	John F. Davidson	12,669	34.76	+0.55
Labour	Rendel John Stubberfield	12,426	34.09	
Labour	Alexander Fraser Ross	12,268	33.66	
Labour	Mabel Howard	12,286	33.71	−15.37
Labour	Kenneth Noel Larkin	12,119	33.25	+1.48
Labour	Trevor Davey	11,719	32.15	
Labour	Patrick Neary	11,591	31.80	+4.45
Labour	Mel Courtney	11,579	31.77	
Labour	Harold Joseph Henry	11,016	30.22	
Independent	Charles E Cullen	3,389	9.29	+0.43
Communist	Jack Locke	2,327	6.38	+1.00
Independent	William John McFaul	1,745	4.78	+0.11
