= Skjellerup =

Skjellerup, sometimes anglicised as Skellerup, is a surname. Notable people with the surname include:

- Blake Skjellerup (born 1985), New Zealand speed skater
- Frank Skjellerup (1875–1952), Australian astronomer
- Laurs Skjellerup (born 2002), Danish footballer
- Mathies Skjellerup (born 1996), Danish footballer
- George Skellerup (1881–1955), New Zealand industrialist
- Peter Skellerup (1918–2006), New Zealand industrialist and local-body politician
- Valdemar Skellerup (1907–1982), New Zealand industrialist

== See also ==
- Skellerup (disambiguation)
