= Peter Skellerup =

New Zealand industrialist

Peter Skellerup CBE

Deputy mayor of Christchurch
- In office 1974–1980
- Preceded by: Robert Macfarlane
- Succeeded by: Rex Lester

Personal details
- Born: Peter Jensen Reid Skjellerup; 14 January 1918 Christchurch, New Zealand
- Died: 15 May 2006 (aged 88) Christchurch, New Zealand
- Relatives: George Skellerup (father); Valdemar Skellerup (brother); Frank Skjellerup (uncle)
- Occupation: Industrialist
- Known for: Managing director of Skellerup Industries

Military service
- Allegiance: New Zealand
- Branch/service: Army
- Years of service: From 1942
- Unit: 37th Battalion 2NZEF

Peter Jensen Reid Skellerup CBE (also Skjellerup, 14 January 1918 – 15 May 2006) was a New Zealand industrialist and philanthropist.

== Early life ==
Skellerup was born in Christchurch in 1918. His father was George Skellerup (1881–1955), founder of rubber manufacturing company Skellerup Industries. His mother was Elizabeth, née Reid. His father was born in Australia but the family stemmed from Denmark, with his father's birth name including a silent "j" that he dropped from the name at some point. On their birth certificates, the original spelling Skjellerup was used for all five siblings born between 1907 (his brother Valdemar was the oldest) and 1918 (Peter was the youngest). The three middle siblings were girls. (Note: The birth certificate registration numbers are 1908/2923 (Valdemar), 1911/23121 (Gwenda Margaret), 1915/5460 (Margery Berk), 1916/1606 (Winifred Elizabeth), and 1918/4920 (Peter)) Frank Skjellerup, an Australian amateur astronomer, was his uncle. Peter received his education at Christchurch Boys' High School. He saw service in World War II with the 37th Battalion of the 2nd New Zealand Expeditionary Force in the Solomon Islands fighting against Japan.

== Commercial life ==
Upon leaving school in 1934, he became an office boy in one of his father's companies, the Latex Rubber Company.

He took over as joint managing director in 1955 upon his father's death alongside his brother Valdemar. In 1977, he became deputy chairman of the Skellerup parent company. In 1982, he was handed full control by his brother not long before his brother's death.

== Public office ==
Skellerup was first elected to Christchurch City Council in 1958 and served almost continuously until 1980. The Labour Party won the 1957 general election and upon the Second Labour Government being formed, several sitting city councillors received high-ranking positions in government and resigned from their local roles. This triggered the 1958 Christchurch local by-election, where four city councillor positions were contested by nine candidates. Skellerup, standing for the conservative Citizens' ticket, came forth and was thus elected. In the 1959 Christchurch local election, the Citizens' ticket won all 19 city council seats, with Skellerup coming fifth (the mayor, George Manning, was from the Labour Party). Skellerup came sixth in 1962. In the 1965 local election, Skellerup stood for both the city council and the mayoralty. He was decisively defeated by the mayoral incumbent, Manning, but came second in the city council election (once again for 19 positions). In 1968, Skellerup stood for council only and came second. During this term, Skellerup lost his council seat over a technicality. He had breached the Local Authorities (Members’ Interests) Act 1968.

In the lead up to the 1971 election, Skellerup was publicly critical of the Citizens' mayor, Ron Guthrey, over his proposal to build a road through North Hagley Park. Skellerup had never been fond of Guthrey and as a past chairman of the Parks and Reserves Committee, he was extremely annoyed by Guthrey going behind his back and announcing the road proposal without checking with him first. At the election, Guthrey was defeated, Labour gained a majority on the city council, but Skellerup was the highest-polling council candidate by a large margin.

The 1974 election was a turnaround, with Labour's incumbent Pickering defeated by the Citizens' candidate Hamish Hay. According to Hay, Skellerup was not considered as the Citizens' mayoral candidate over the furore that he had caused for Guthrey. The Citizens' ticket also gained a majority on the city council and from 1974 to 1980, Skellerup was deputy-mayor to Hay.

Skellerup was also a member of the Lyttelton Harbour Board for twelve years, for three of those he was the chairman. Since 1964, he was Consul of Denmark, first for the South Island and later for all of New Zealand.

== Family, recognition and death ==
In 1941, he married Rita Margaret Grogan (26 August 1919 – 1985); they had one son and three daughters. His wife died in 1985. His second marriage was to Evelyn Rogers, who died in 1999.

In 1974, he was awarded Knight of the Order of the Dannebrog by Denmark. In the 1979 New Year Honours, Skellerup was appointed a Commander of the Order of the British Empire, for services to the City of Christchurch. Skellerup sponsored the Antarctic wing at Canterbury Museum and to recognise his contribution, Skellerup Glacier in New Zealand's Ross Dependency in Antarctica was named for him.

Skellerup died in Christchurch on 15 May 2006, and was buried at Ruru Lawn Cemetery. He was survived by the four children from his first marriage.

== Sources ==
- Hay, Hamish (1989). Hay Days. Christchurch: Caxton Press. ISBN 0908563310.
- Traue, James Edward (1978). Who's Who in New Zealand, 1978 (11th ed.). Wellington: Reed Publishing.
