= 1947 Christchurch mayoral election =

Mayoral election in New Zealand

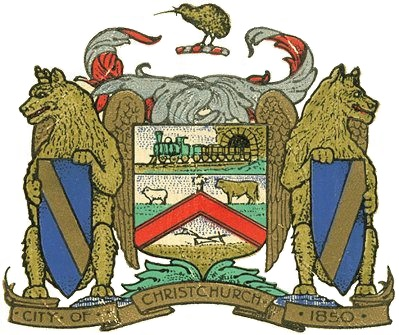
- 19 November 1947
- Turnout: 41,581 (46.20%)
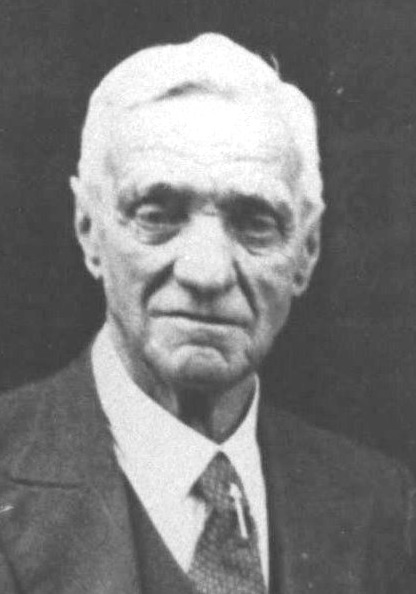

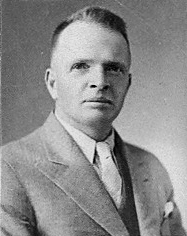

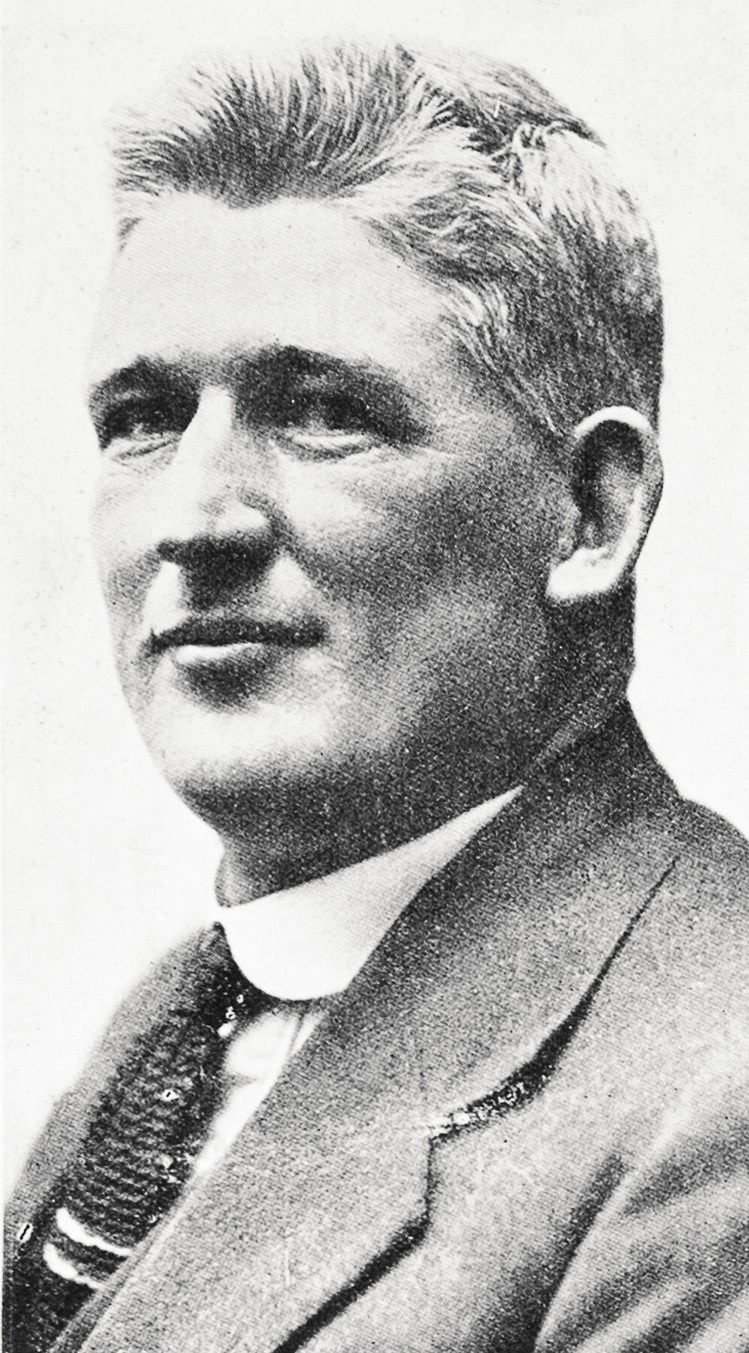
Candidate	Ernest Andrews	David Barnes	Melville Lyons
Party	Citizens'	Labour	Independent
Popular vote	21,183	15,587	4,811
Percentage	50.94	37.48	15,587
Mayor before election
Ernest Andrews
Elected mayor
Ernest Andrews

The 1947 Christchurch mayoral election was part of the New Zealand local elections held that same year. In 1947, election were held for the Mayor of Christchurch plus other local government positions. The polling was conducted using the standard first-past-the-post electoral method.

Incumbent Mayor Ernest Andrews was re-elected, defeating former Labour MP David Barnes and deputy mayor Melville Lyons. Fourteen Citizens' candidates were elected to the Christchurch City Council as well as five from the Labour Party.

== Mayoral results ==
The following table gives the election results:

1947 Christchurch mayoral election
Party	Candidate	Votes	%	±%
Citizens'	Ernest Andrews	21,183	50.94	−11.49
Labour	David Barnes	15,587	37.48	
Independent	Melville Lyons	4,811	11.57	
Informal votes		174	0.41	−0.37
Majority		5,596	13.45	−11.40
Turnout		41,581	46.20	

== Council results ==
1947 Christchurch local election
Party	Candidate	Votes	%	±%
Citizens'	James Hay	24,128	58.02	−3.56
Citizens'	Leslie George Amos	21,726	52.24	−1.96
Labour	George Manning	21,502	51.71	+0.51
Citizens'	Mary McLean	21,353	51.35	−6.28
Citizens'	Bill Glue	19,850	47.73	−5.93
Labour	Teresa Green	19,828	47.68	−0.31
Citizens'	Jim Clarke	19,812	47.64	−7.82
Citizens'	Bill MacGibbon	19,687	47.34	
Citizens'	Ron Guthrey	19,492	46.87	−11.72
Citizens'	John Edward Tait	19,472	46.82	−4.04
Citizens'	Reginald Gilbert Brown	19,309	46.43	−6.74
Citizens'	Clyde Sheppard	19,243	46.27	−6.33
Labour	Thomas Henry Butterfield	18,992	45.67	
Citizens'	Percy Samuel Turnbull	18,200	43.76	
Citizens'	George Griffiths	18,075	43.46	−5.88
Labour	Robert Macfarlane	17,902	43.05	
Labour	John Mathison	17,874	42.98	
Citizens'	Wilfrid Owen	17,700	42.56	
Citizens'	William James Cowles	17,651	42.45	
Labour	Lyn Christie	17,647	42.44	+2.02
Citizens'	Frank Llewellyn Brandt	17,565	42.24	
Citizens'	Arthur Norman Stone	17,293	41.58	
Labour	John Edward Jones	17,239	41.45	+3.95
Citizens'	Michael Francis O'Brien	17,160	41.26	
Citizens'	Frederick Henry Dephoff	17,099	41.12	
Labour	Reg Jones	16,403	39.44	
Citizens'	George Wallace Parmenter	16,294	39.18	
Labour	Norman Reginald Forbes	16,238	39.05	
Labour	Daphne Claudia Fox	16,236	39.04	
Labour	James Shankland	15,940	38.33	+3.36
Labour	John Gordon Power	15,537	37.36	
Labour	Margaret Mackwell	15,527	37.34	
Labour	Archie Grant	15,471	37.20	
Labour	James Sturrock	15,449	37.15	
Labour	Francis George Hayes	15,018	36.11	
Labour	Frederick Kelso	15,018	36.11	+4.11
Labour	Hugh Henry McCaw	14,827	35.65	
Labour	Jack Leslie Laby	13,928	33.49	
Independent	Fred Whiley	4,239	10.19	+1.48
Communist	Jack Locke	3,473	8.35	
Communist	Alec Ostler	3,276	7.87	
