= 1962 Christchurch mayoral election =

New Zealand mayoral election

← 1959	13 October 1962	1965 →
- Turnout: 28,933 (39.50%)
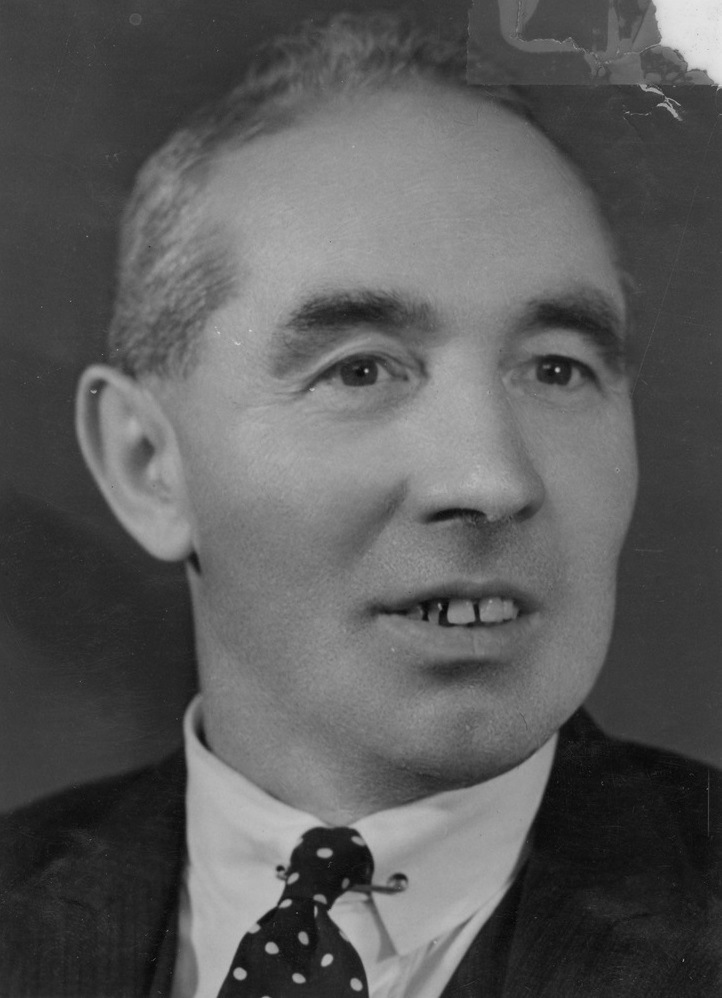

Candidate	George Manning	Harold Smith
Party	Labour	Citizens'
Popular vote	19,194	9,612
Percentage	66.34	33.23
Mayor before election
George Manning
Elected mayor
George Manning

The 1962 Christchurch mayoral election was part of the New Zealand local elections held that same year. In 1962, election were held for the Mayor of Christchurch plus other local government positions. The polling was conducted using the standard first-past-the-post electoral method.

== Background ==
Sitting mayor George Manning was re-elected for a third term, greatly increasing his majority against deputy mayor Harold Smith. There was a large swing to the Labour Party on the city council as well, with Labour gaining seven of the nineteen council seats.

== Mayoralty results ==
The following table gives the election results:

1962 Christchurch mayoral election
Party	Candidate	Votes	%	±%
Labour	George Manning	19,194	66.34	+14.42
Citizens'	Harold Smith	9,612	33.23	−13.92
Informal votes		127	0.43	−0.48
Majority		9,582	33.11	+28.34
Turnout		28,933	39.50	+7.03

== Councillor results ==
1962 Christchurch local election
Party	Candidate	Votes	%	±%
Citizens'	Ron Guthrey	16,287	56.29	+2.19
Labour	Neville Pickering	15,651	54.09	
Citizens'	Hamish Hay	15,271	52.78	−7.22
Labour	Robert Macfarlane	15,063	52.06	+6.11
Citizens'	Bill Glue	15,255	52.72	−5.30
Citizens'	Peter Skellerup	15,175	52.44	−3.90
Citizens'	Mary Mclean	14,707	50.83	−7.36
Citizens'	Tom Flint	14,657	50.65	+1.43
Citizens'	Maurice Carter	14,409	49.80	+4.81
Labour	Mabel Howard	14,356	49.61	
Labour	Reg Stillwell	14,108	48.76	+6.95
Citizens'	Harold Smith	13,852	47.87	−6.53
Labour	Lyn Christie	13,726	47.44	+4.34
Citizens'	William Ernest Olds	13,576	46.92	−4.72
Citizens'	Alma Schumacher	13,193	45.59	−5.94
Citizens'	Reginald George Brown	13,098	45.27	−10.57
Labour	Tommy Armstrong	12,836	44.36	
Labour	Harold Denton	12,791	44.20	+4.31
Citizens'	George Griffiths	12,772	44.14	+6.06
Citizens'	Gordon Alison Guy Connal	12,537	43.33	−5.28
Citizens'	Gordon Hattaway	12,387	42.81	−6.08
Citizens'	Alvan Samuel Hollander	11,899	41.12	−6.92
Labour	Ted Adcock	11,882	41.06	
Citizens'	Philip Maxwell McShane	11,809	40.81	
Citizens'	Eric Munt	11,668	40.32	
Citizens'	Roland Henry Hammond	11,542	39.89	
Labour	Reg Jones	11,531	39.85	
Labour	Gertrude Cree	11,473	39.65	+4.40
Labour	Norman Reginald Forbes	11,286	39.00	+2.75
Labour	Arthur John Smith	11,270	38.95	+2.35
Citizens'	Charles Herbert Reardon	10,775	37.24	
Labour	John Palmer	10,579	36.56	+3.34
Labour	Archibald Edward Lester	10,251	35.43	
Labour	Milward James Mathews	10,017	34.62	
Labour	Harley Robert J. Manson	9,981	34.49	
Labour	Murray Frederick Hartman	9,927	34.31	
Labour	Rex Laurence T. Sandford	9,532	32.94	
Labour	Lyell Charles John Southon	9,375	32.40	+1.97
Independent	Charles E. Cullen	2,484	8.58	+0.08
Independent	Edward Charles Knight	2,462	8.50	
Independent	Joseph John Forster	2,221	7.67	
Communist	Clive William Joseph Walklin	1,999	6.90	
Communist	Jack Locke	1,642	5.67	−0.30
Independent	William John McFaul	1,513	5.22	
