= 1959 Christchurch mayoral election =

New Zealand mayoral election

| ← 1958 | 21 November 1959 | 1962 → |
- Turnout: 30,108 (32.47%)
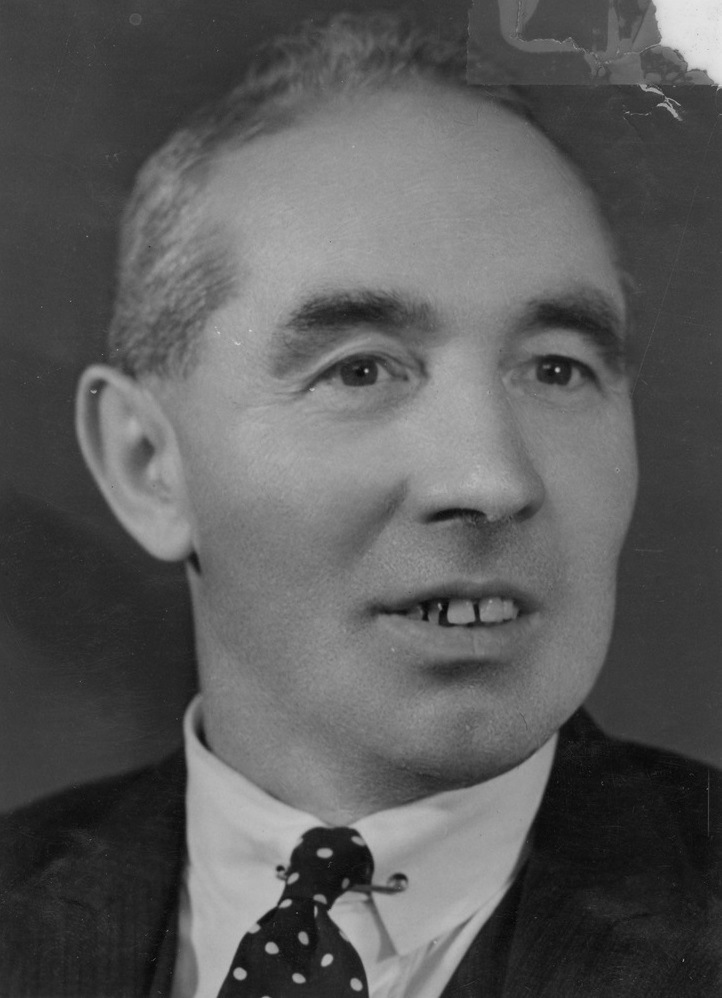

| Candidate | George Manning | Harold Smith |
| Party | Labour | Citizens' |
| Popular vote | 15,635 | 14,197 |
| Percentage | 51.92 | 47.15 |
Mayor before election
George Manning
Elected mayor
George Manning

The 1959 Christchurch mayoral election was part of the New Zealand local elections held that same year. In 1959, election were held for the Mayor of Christchurch plus other local government positions. The polling was conducted using the standard first-past-the-post electoral method.

== Background ==
Sitting mayor George Manning was re-elected for a full term, with a decreased majority, opposed only by Harold Smith of the Citizens' Association. Smith was successful in winning a seat on the council and was appointed deputy mayor. The Citizens' Association won every council seat leaving Manning (who was also elected to the Harbour Board) as the only Labour Party elected representative in Christchurch. The overall anti-Labour vote (which was consistent nationwide) was attributed to the unpopularity of the then Labour government. Prime Minister Walter Nash commented simply "We seem to have held the mayoralties" in reference that in Christchurch (as well as in Wellington and Lower Hutt) Labour mayors were re-elected despite voters electing majority centre-right councils.

== Mayoralty results ==
The following table gives the election results:

1959 Christchurch mayoral election
| Party | Candidate | Votes | % | ±% |
|---|---|---|---|---|
| Labour | George Manning | 15,635 | 51.92 | −5.41 |
| Citizens' | Harold Smith | 14,197 | 47.15 | |
| Informal votes | | 276 | 0.91 | +0.33 |
| Majority | | 1,438 | 4.77 | −10.48 |
| Turnout | | 30,108 | 32.47 | +7.36 |

== Councillor results ==
Councillors were elected at large and 19 positions were available. All councillors were from the Citizens' ticket.

1959 Christchurch local election
| Party | Candidate | Votes | % | ±% |
|---|---|---|---|---|
| Citizens' | Hamish Hay | 18,065 | 60.00 | |
| Citizens' | Ron Guthrey | 17,610 | 58.48 | +10.65 |
| Citizens' | Mary McLean | 17,521 | 58.19 | +6.30 |
| Citizens' | Bill Glue | 17,469 | 58.02 | +6.89 |
| Citizens' | Peter Skellerup | 16,965 | 56.34 | +4.77 |
| Citizens' | Reginald George Brown | 16,815 | 55.84 | +10.95 |
| Citizens' | Maurice Carter | 16,443 | 54.61 | +7.76 |
| Citizens' | Harold Smith | 16,379 | 54.40 | +3.69 |
| Citizens' | Bill MacGibbon | 16,282 | 54.07 | +2.20 |
| Citizens' | William James Cowles | 15,625 | 51.89 | +5.28 |
| Citizens' | William Ernest Olds | 15,550 | 51.64 | −7.28 |
| Citizens' | Alma Schumacher | 15,517 | 51.53 | +8.37 |
| Citizens' | George Griffiths | 15,115 | 50.20 | +8.34 |
| Citizens' | Tom Flint | 14,822 | 49.22 | |
| Citizens' | Gordon Denis Hattaway | 14,721 | 48.89 | |
| Citizens' | James Ronald Smith | 14,679 | 48.75 | |
| Citizens' | Walter Raymond Campbell | 14,670 | 48.72 | +6.47 |
| Citizens' | Gordon Alison Guy Connal | 14,637 | 48.61 | |
| Citizens' | Alvan Samuel Hollander | 14,465 | 48.04 | |
| Labour | Robert Macfarlane (Note: Macfarlane was appointed to the council on 13 May 1961 to fill a vacancy caused by William James Cowles' death) | 13,837 | 45.95 | −9.21 |
| Labour | Lyn Christie | 12,979 | 43.10 | −6.19 |
| Labour | Reg Stillwell | 12,590 | 41.81 | −1.32 |
| Labour | Harold Denton | 12,012 | 39.89 | −3.79 |
| Labour | Mick Connelly | 11,974 | 39.77 | −5.59 |
| Labour | Arthur John Smith | 11,020 | 36.60 | −5.57 |
| Labour | Norman Reginald Forbes | 10,917 | 36.25 | −7.02 |
| Labour | Gertrude Cree | 10,614 | 35.25 | |
| Labour | James Shankland Sr. | 10,367 | 34.43 | −7.02 |
| Labour | Clarence Hall | 10,184 | 33.82 | |
| Labour | John Palmer | 10,004 | 33.22 | −4.78 |
| Labour | Walter William Browne | 9,940 | 33.01 | |
| Labour | Archibald Galbraith | 9,843 | 32.69 | −7.02 |
| Labour | John Gordon Power | 9,792 | 32.52 | |
| Labour | John Athol Gregor | 9,564 | 31.76 | −7.22 |
| Labour | Eric Leach | 9,570 | 31.78 | |
| Labour | Lyell Charles John Southon | 9,162 | 30.43 | |
| Labour | Richard Leach | 8,968 | 29.78 | |
| Labour | James Quickenden | 8,864 | 29.44 | |
| Independent | George Maxwell Edmonds | 4,823 | 16.01 | |
| Independent | Charles E. Cullen | 2,610 | 8.66 | |
| Communist | Jack Locke | 1,800 | 5.97 | +1.14 |

Table footnotes:
