= 1971 Christchurch mayoral election =

New Zealand mayoral election

← 1968	9 October 1971	1974 →
- Turnout: 49,310 (56.57%)
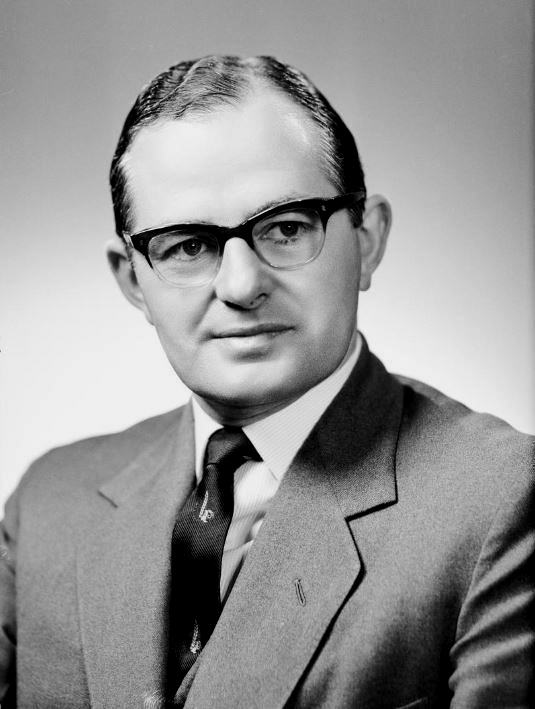

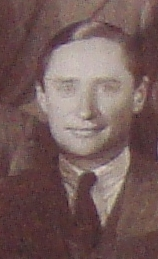
Candidate	Neville Pickering	Ron Guthrey
Party	Labour	Citizens'
Popular vote	25,121	23,212
Percentage	50.94	47.07
Mayor before election
Ron Guthrey
Elected mayor
Neville Pickering

The 1971 Christchurch mayoral election was part of the New Zealand local elections held that same year. In 1971, elections were held for the Mayor of Christchurch plus other local government positions. The polling was conducted using the standard first-past-the-post electoral method. The incumbent, Ron Guthrey of the Citizens' ticket, was defeated by the Labour Party candidate Neville Pickering.

== Background ==
There were two hotly-discussed issues leading up to the 1971 election: a proposal by the mayor to build a road through North Hagley Park, and the venue choice for the 1974 British Commonwealth Games. Senior councillor Peter Skellerup of the Citizens' ticket criticised the incumbent mayor, Ron Guthrey (also of the Citizens' ticket) on the road proposal. According to Hamish Hay, a later mayor, the road proposal was Guthrey's undoing, and he was defeated by Labour councillor Neville Pickering. It was the first occasion in 46 years that a sitting mayor had been defeated. Labour won a majority on the city council as well, winning control of the council for the first time since 1956, resulting in the composition of the council at eleven seats to eight in favour of the Labour Party. The highest-polling councillor, by a margin of 2500 votes, was Skellerup, though.

== Mayoralty results ==
The following table gives the election results:

1971 Christchurch mayoral election
Party	Candidate	Votes	%	±%
Labour	Neville Pickering	25,121	50.95	
Citizens'	Ron Guthrey	23,212	47.07	−16.78
Independent	Tubby Hansen	618	1.25	
Informal votes		359	0.73	±0.00
Majority		1,909	3.90	
Turnout		49,310	56.57	+15.00

This is the first time that Tubby Hansen stood for the Christchurch mayoralty. As of 2022, he has stood in every local election for the mayoralty since.

== Councillor results ==
1971 Christchurch local election
Party	Candidate	Votes	%	±%
Citizens'	Peter Skellerup	27,748	56.27	−1.50
Citizens'	Hamish Hay	25,219	51.14	−11.50
Labour	Robert Macfarlane	24,217	49.11	+4.14
Labour	Albert Orme	23,735	48.13	
Labour	Brian Alderdice	22,952	46.54	+6.67
Labour	Mollie Clark	22,841	46.32	
Labour	David Caygill	22,662	45.95	
Citizens'	Peter Dunbar	22,471	45.57	−6.23
Labour	Durham Dowell	22,270	45.16	
Citizens'	Norman Greenslade	21,944	44.50	
Citizens'	Helen Garrett	21,879	44.37	−3.53
Citizens'	Les Amos	21,780	44.16	−7.26
Labour	Mary Batchelor	21,380	43.35	
Labour	Nancy Sutherland	21,281	43.15	
Citizens'	Maurice Carter	21,278	43.15	+8.74
Labour	Peter William Anderson	21,111	42.81	
Labour	Bill Massey	20,634	41.84	
Citizens'	Buster Cowles	20,024	40.60	−10.66
Labour	Reginald John Cunningham	19,920	40.39	+5.62
Labour	John F. Davidson	19,919	40.39	+5.63
Citizens'	Peter Blaxall	19,914	40.38	−4.80
Labour	Harold Turner	19,675	39.90	
Citizens'	Harry Blazey	19,537	39.62	−7.13
Labour	Bruce John Corkran	19,530	39.60	
Labour	Raymond Hugh Murray	19,405	39.35	
Citizens'	Bruce Britten	19,243	39.02	−9.06
Citizens'	Harold Smith	19,179	38.89	+8.62
Labour	John Gordon Power	19,170	38.87	
Labour	Alexander Fraser Ross	18,963	38.45	+4.79
Labour	David Brine	18,883	38.29	
Labour	David Bernard O'Connell	18,616	37.75	
Citizens'	Robertson Stewart	18,533	37.58	−8.60
Citizens'	Alec S. Farrar	18,415	37.34	
Citizens'	Gordon Hattaway	17,699	35.89	−12.26
Citizens'	Ted Taylor	17,356	35.19	−11.76
Citizens'	Bob Baker	17,118	34.71	
Independent	Reg Stillwell	16,129	32.70	−16.73
Citizens'	Walter Campbell	15,832	32.10	
Citizens'	Leicester Steven	15,708	31.85	
Independent	Roger Anthony Bamford	5,514	11.18	
Independent	Rolfe C. Neville	4,993	10.12	
Independent	Edward Foote	4,935	9.99	
Independent	Tubby Hansen	3,669	7.44	

== Aftermath ==
A local government commission recommended that Christchurch amalgamate with some of the small surrounding local authorities and the area be divided into wards for electoral purposes, with the mayor then the only position elected at large. Pickering promised during the election campaign that wards would be introduced for the 1974 local elections. The Citizens' ticket was also in favour of introducing wards but tied this to amalgamation going ahead. Amalgamation did not proceed but the Labour-led council introduced five wards in time for the 1974 local elections.
