= 1974 Christchurch mayoral election =

New Zealand mayoral election

← 1971	12 October 1974	1977 →
- Turnout: 54,718 (61.00%)
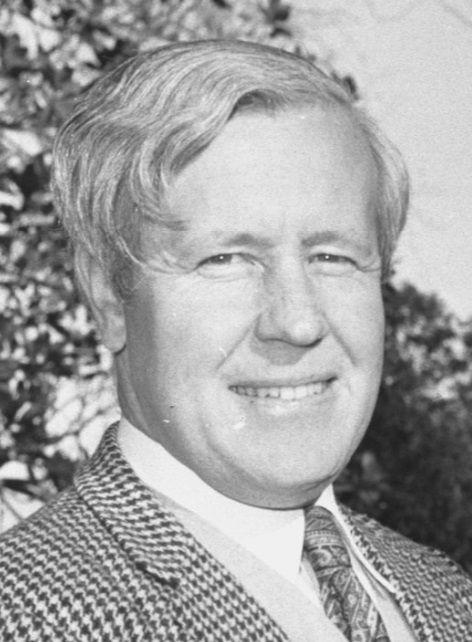

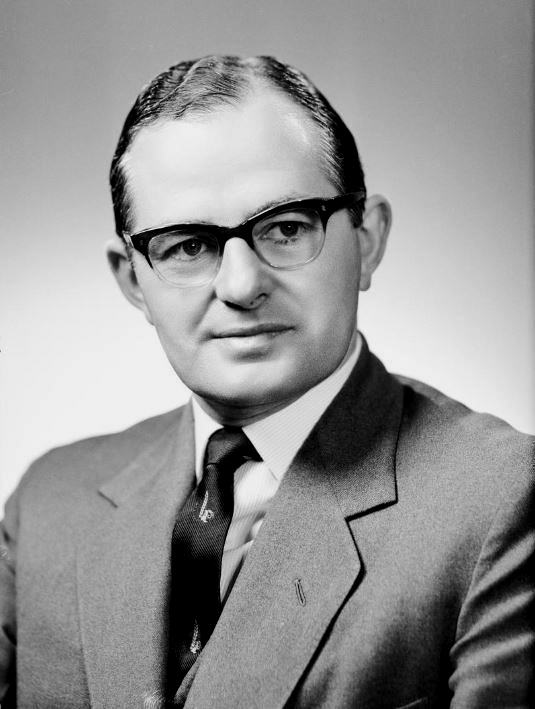
Candidate	Hamish Hay	Neville Pickering
Party	Citizens'	Labour
Popular vote	26,919	25,154
Percentage	49.19	45.97
Mayor before election
Neville Pickering
Elected mayor
Hamish Hay

The 1974 Christchurch mayoral election was part of the New Zealand local elections held that same year. In 1974, election were held for the Mayor of Christchurch plus other local government positions. The polling was conducted using the standard first-past-the-post electoral method. A significant change was the introduction of a ward system, with city councillors elected in five wards.

== Background ==
Sitting mayor Neville Pickering was defeated by Citizens' councillor Hamish Hay in a closely fought race with a large turnout. Pickering actually increased his poll but the increased voter turnout favoured Hay leading The Press to state the result was out of increased interest rather than a swing of public opinion. It was the second consecutive election that an incumbent mayor had been defeated. The Citizens' Association regained their majority on the city council too, resulting in the composition of the council at eleven seats to eight.

== Results ==
The final results were not released until 25 October; the following table gives the election results:

1974 Christchurch mayoral election
Party	Candidate	Votes	%	±%
Citizens'	Hamish Hay	29,482	49.70	
Labour	Neville Pickering	27,237	45.91	−5.03
Values	Gary Williams	2,068	3.49	
Independent	Tubby Hansen	325	0.55	−0.71
Informal votes		212	0.36	−0.37
Majority		2,245	3.80	−0.10
Turnout		59,324		

== Ward results ==
Prior to the 1971 local elections, a local government commission had recommended that Christchurch amalgamate with some of the small surrounding local authorities and the area be divided into wards for electoral purposes, with the mayor then the only position elected at large. Pickering had promised during the 1971 election campaign that wards would be introduced for the 1974 local elections. The Citizens' ticket had also been in favour of introducing wards but tied this to amalgamation going ahead. Amalgamation did not proceed but the Labour-led council introduced five wards, the maximum number permitted by law, in time for the 1974 local elections. The central area, which had been known as Avon, was renamed to Pegasus to avoid confusion with the Avon general electorate, with the Pegasus ward electing four councillors. The other four wards were named after the cardinal points of the compass, electing four councillors each apart from the West ward with three councillors. Therefore, the total number of councillors at 19 remained unchanged.

The overall results of the ward elections to the Christchurch City Council was as follows.

Party/ticket	Councillors
Citizens'	11
Labour	8

The results per ward are shown in the following tables:

Pegasus ward (4)
Party	Candidate	Votes	%	±%
Labour	Mary Batchelor	6,131		
Citizens'	Peter Dunbar	5,958		
Labour	Bill Massey	5,700		
Labour	Peter William Anderson	5,652		
Labour	Vicki Buck	5,527		
Citizens'	Alan Cockburn	4,076		
Citizens'	Carole Evans	3,836		
Citizens'	Alister Hogue	3,250		
Values	Robert Clarkson	1,180		
Independent	Alan Charles Easterbrook	580		
Informal votes		170		

East ward (4)
Party	Candidate	Votes	%	±%
Citizens'	Peter Skellerup	7,114		
Citizens'	Bill Brittenden	6,596		
Labour	Brian Alderdice	5,730		
Citizens'	Rex Arbuckle	5,472		
Citizens'	Alastair Ansell	5,343		
Labour	John F. Davidson	4,780		
Labour	Robert John Todd	4,702		
Labour	John Gordon Power	4,542		
Independent	Te Puke-Watson	1,241		
Values	Andy Lea	1,150		
Values	Leo Taylor	964		
Informal votes		230		

South ward (4)
Party	Candidate	Votes	%	±%
Labour	Mollie Clark	6,679		
Citizens'	Bruce Britten	6,587		
Labour	Robert Macfarlane	6,147		
Labour	Nancy Sutherland	5,518		
Labour	Alex Clark	5,266		
Citizens'	Dan Doyle	5,080		
Citizens'	Joe Tutengaehe	5,035		
Citizens'	Clara Crawford	4,758		
Values	Peter Heal	1,404		
Informal votes		189		

North ward (4)
Party	Candidate	Votes	%	±%
Citizens'	Newton Dodge	6,246		
Citizens'	Peter Blaxall	6,235		
Citizens'	John Burn	5,824		
Labour	David Caygill	5,800		
Citizens'	Bill Hawkey	5,298		
Labour	Malcolm Grenville Reid Drayton	5,226		
Labour	David Jackson	4,256		
Labour	Murray Charles Thomas Marshall	4,113		
Values	Hilde Wright	1,239		
Values	Chris Wilkes	1,096		
Informal votes		217		

West ward (3)
Party	Candidate	Votes	%	±%
Citizens'	Helen Garrett	6,747		
Citizens'	Maurice Carter	6,678		
Citizens'	Gordon Hattaway	6,506		
Labour	Albert Orme	2,598		
Labour	John Patrick Gavigan	2,326		
Labour	Lawrence Albert Mahoney	2,061		
Values	Conway Jack	1,019		
Informal votes		135		

== Aftermath ==
Councillor Massey, who represented the Pegasus ward, died in March 1975 and that triggered a by-election only because Christchurch had introduced the ward system for the 1974 election. Prior to that, when 19 councillors were elected at large, seats had just been left vacant. The Labour Party chose Buck to stand in the by-election. Aged 19, Buck won the by-election on 10 May 1975 by a large margin. She was New Zealand's youngest city councillor at that time.
