= 1953 Christchurch mayoral election =

Mayoral election in New Zealand

- 31 October 1953
- Turnout: 40,930 (48.80%)
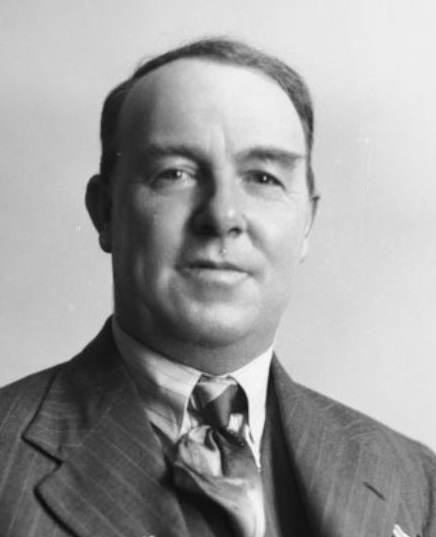

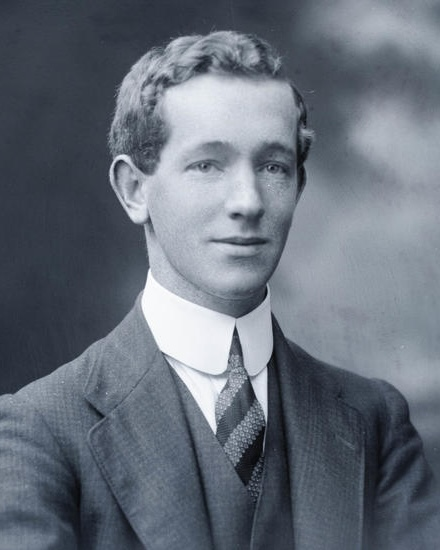
Candidate	Robert Macfarlane	James Hay
Party	Labour	Citizens'
Popular vote	21,316	19,419
Percentage	52.07	47.44
Mayor before election
Robert Macfarlane
Elected mayor
Robert Macfarlane

The 1953 Christchurch mayoral election was part of the New Zealand local elections held that same year. In 1953, election were held for the Mayor of Christchurch plus other local government positions. The polling was conducted using the standard first-past-the-post electoral method.

== Campaign ==
Sitting mayor Robert Macfarlane was re-elected with the largest majority he had won so far against city councillor James Hay. The Labour Party lost two seats on the Council but retained their majority, winning ten seats to the nine won by the Citizens' Association.

A major talking point in the lead up to the election was the potential of a clash with the 1953 Royal Tour. There were proposals to postpone local elections until early 1954 over fears of reduced turnout due to a conflicted schedule. The proposals were considered by the Minister of Internal Affairs William Bodkin, who ultimately decided against it.

== Mayoralty results ==
The following table gives the election results:

1953 Christchurch mayoral election
Party	Candidate	Votes	%	±%
Labour	Robert Macfarlane	21,316	52.07	+6.17
Citizens'	James Hay	19,419	47.44	
Informal votes		195	0.47	−0.62
Majority		1,897	4.63	+1.12
Turnout		40,930	48.80	+11.72

== Council results ==
1953 Christchurch City Council election
Party	Candidate	Votes	%	±%
Labour	George Manning	22,961	56.09	−0.61
Labour	Terry McCombs	22,326	54.54	+2.84
Labour	Mabel Howard	21,145	51.66	−0.52
Labour	John Mathison	20,373	49.77	+1.05
Labour	Teresa Green	20,278	49.54	−2.35
Labour	Lyn Christie	19,548	47.75	−0.70
Citizens'	Mary McLean	19,431	47.47	+0.05
Citizens'	Bill MacGibbon	19,344	47.26	
Citizens'	Ernest Adams	19,198	46.90	
Citizens'	Les Amos	18,784	45.89	−2.83
Citizens'	Bill Glue	18,777	45.87	−0.51
Labour	Charles Baldwin	18,636	45.53	+1.52
Labour	Norman Reginald Forbes	18,253	44.59	+2.02
Citizens'	Clyde Sheppard	17,836	43.57	−0.52
Labour	John Edward Jones	17,692	43.22	+1.81
Citizens'	Ron Guthrey	17,659	43.14	+0.11
Citizens'	John Edward Tait	17,626	43.06	−1.05
Citizens'	Frederick Cuthbert Penfold	17,417	42.55	
Labour	James Shankland Sr.	17,405	42.52	+1.18
Citizens'	William James Cowles	17,132	41.85	+0.58
Citizens'	Harold Smith	16,994	41.51	+2.37
Citizens'	Frank Llewellyn Brandt	16,887	41.25	+0.47
Citizens'	Reginald Gilbert Brown	16,801	41.04	−1.02
Citizens'	Fred Price	16,528	40.38	
Labour	Arthur John Smith	16,479	40.26	−3.99
Labour	James Sturrock	16,479	40.26	−1.91
Labour	James Shankland Jr.	16,475	40.25	
Citizens'	George Griffiths	16,466	40.22	−0.14
Labour	Percy Malcolm Velvin	16,449	40.18	−2.20
Labour	William Percy Warner	16,375	40.00	−3.14
Labour	Robert Newman	16,351	39.94	−1.30
Citizens'	Jack Leslie Laby	16,339	39.91	−0.74
Labour	Roy Smith	16,093	39.31	
Citizens'	Rolfe Neville	15,995	39.07	
Citizens'	Avey Hudson Dale	15,870	38.77	
Labour	John Gordon Wilson Power	15,787	38.57	−1.44
Citizens'	Arthur Norman Stone	15,229	37.20	−1.59
Citizens'	John Morrison	14,991	36.62	
Independent	Charles Trillo	3,977	9.71	
Communist	Jack Locke	2,899	7.08	
Communist	Alec Ostler	2,190	5.35	+1.75
