= David Hay (cardiologist) =

New Zealand cardiologist (1927–2016)

Sir David Hay CBE
- Born: David Russell Hay; 8 December 1927; Christchurch, New Zealand
- Died: 3 December 2016 (aged 88); Christchurch, New Zealand
- Education: University of Otago
- Spouse: Jocelyn Valerie Bell (m. 1958)
- Relatives: James Hay (father); Hamish Hay (brother); Laurie Salas (sister); Ernst Hay (uncle)
- Scientific career
- Fields: Cardiology

Sir David Russell Hay CBE (8 December 1927 – 3 December 2016) was a New Zealand cardiologist and anti-smoking campaigner.

== Biography ==
Born in Christchurch, Hay was one of four children of philanthropist Sir James Hay, including his identical twin brother Sir Hamish Hay and older sister Dame Laurie Salas. Educated at St Andrew's College, he spent 1945 at Canterbury University College, before going on to study medicine at the University of Otago, graduating MB ChB in 1951.

Hay then trained as a cardiologist in Britain, where he was influenced by the work of epidemiologist Sir Richard Doll linking smoking to adverse health outcomes. He returned to Christchurch in 1955.

In Christchurch in 1958, Hay married Jocelyn Valerie Bell, whom he had met while they were both studying medicine at Otago. The couple went on to have two children. Hay graduated MD from the University of Otago in 1960.

From 1959 to 1984, Hay was employed by the North Canterbury Hospital Board, becoming a prominent cardiologist. He was also a clinical academic at the University of Otago's Christchurch School of Medicine from 1973 to 1988. He was a long-time campaigner against smoking and the tobacco industry in his role as inaugural medical director of the New Zealand Heart Foundation (1977–92). In 1999, Hay retired from the New Zealand Heart Foundation after 30 years, having served as its president from 1996 to 1999.

Hay held a range of positions on professional bodies, including vice president of the Royal Australasian College of Physicians from 1988 to 1992, president of the Canterbury branch of the British Medical Association in 1972, and New Zealand chair of the Cardiac Society of Australia and New Zealand from 1977 to 1981. In 1977 he was appointed a member of the World Health Organization Expert Advisory Panel on Tobacco and Health, and in 1987 he became an overseas regional advisor to the Royal College of Physicians.

Hay published his memoirs in 2005, under the title Heart sounds: a life at the forefront of health care.

Hay died in Christchurch on 3 December 2016. His wife, Jocelyn, Lady Hay, died in 2021.

== Honours and awards ==
Hay became a Fellow of the Royal Australasian College of Physicians in 1965, and was elected a Fellow of the Royal College of Physicians in 1971. He was appointed a Commander of the Order of the British Empire in the 1981 Queen's Birthday Honours, and a Knight Bachelor in the 1991 New Year Honours, both for services to the New Zealand Heart Foundation.

In 1990 Hay was awarded the New Zealand 1990 Commemoration Medal, in 1992 he was made a life member of the New Zealand Heart Foundation, and in 1995 he received the World Health Organization Tobacco and Health Medal in recognition of his advocacy of smokefree issues and legislation in New Zealand and internationally.
