= 1958 Christchurch mayoral by-election =

New Zealand mayoral by-election

← 1956	17 May 1958	1959 →
- Turnout: 22,165 (25.11%)
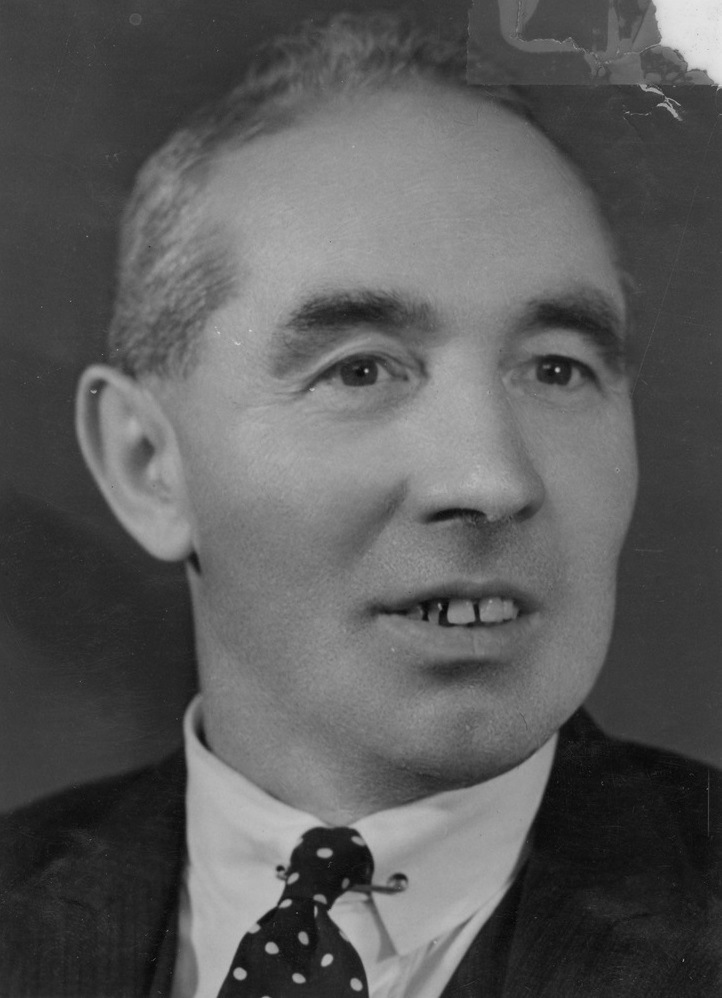
Candidate	George Manning	Bill Glue
Party	Labour	Citizens'
Popular vote	12,708	9,327
Percentage	57.33	42.07
Mayor before election
Robert Macfarlane
Elected mayor
George Manning

The 1958 Christchurch mayoral election was held to elect a successor to Robert Macfarlane who resigned as Mayor of Christchurch upon his selection as Speaker of the New Zealand House of Representatives. The polling was conducted using the standard first-past-the-post electoral method.

== Background ==
Labour councillor George Manning was elected to replace McFarlane, opposed only by councillor William "Bill" Glue of the Citizens' Association.

A by-election for the City Council was also held upon the resignations of both Manning and Glue in order to contest the mayoralty. Councillors Mabel Howard and John Mathison also resigned their seats following their election as cabinet ministers at the formation of the Second Labour government at the November 1957 general election.

McFarlane was elected for a seat on the council, with the remaining three seats being won by the Citizens' Association. Glue was re-elected to the council with Bill MacGibbon and Peter Skellerup the other successful candidates.

== Mayoralty results ==
The following table gives the election results:

1958 Christchurch mayoral by-election
Party	Candidate	Votes	%	±%
Labour	George Manning	12,708	57.33	
Citizens'	Bill Glue	9,327	42.07	
Informal votes		130	0.58	
Majority		3,381	15.25	
Turnout		22,165	25.11	−17.34

Manning polled highest at 84 polling stations with Glue finishing first in remaining 25.

== Council results ==
The following table gives the election results:

1958 Christchurch City Council by-election
Party	Candidate	Votes	%	±%
Labour	Robert Macfarlane	11,691	55.16	
Citizens'	Bill Glue	11,408	53.82	+2.69
Citizens'	Bill MacGibbon	10,993	51.87	
Citizens'	Peter Skellerup	10,931	51.57	
Citizens'	Fred Price	9,696	45.75	+2.63
Labour	Tom McGuigan	9,589	45.24	
Labour	Lawrence Godfrey Graham White	9,399	44.34	
Labour	Edith Tongue	9,322	43.98	+4.68
Independent	Ernest Yealands	1,441	6.79	+1.32
Informal votes		305	1.43	−0.80
Majority		1,235	5.82	
Turnout		21,193	24.01	−18.44
