= Laurie Salas =

New Zealand women's rights and peace activist (1922–2017)

Dame Laurie Salas DBE QSO
- Born: Margaret Laurence Hay; 8 February 1922; Wellington, New Zealand
- Died: 26 January 2017 (aged 94); Karori, New Zealand
- Known for: Women's rights and peace activism
- Spouses: Ian Halliday Webster (m. 1941; died 1943) Jack Reuben Salas (died 2014)
- Relatives: James Hay (father); David Hay (brother); Hamish Hay (brother); Ernst Hay (uncle)

Dame Margaret Laurence Salas DBE QSO (née Hay; 8 February 1922 – 26 January 2017), known as Laurie Salas, was a New Zealand women's rights and peace activist.

== Early life and family ==
Born in Wellington in 1922, Salas was one of four children of philanthropist James Lawrence Hay and Davidina Mertel Hay (née Gunn); her siblings included Sir Hamish Hay and Sir David Hay. She was educated at Rangi Ruru Girls' School in Christchurch, and studied at Canterbury University College, graduating with a Bachelor of Arts in 1942.

On 17 May 1941 she married Ian Halliday Webster at St Ninian's Presbyterian Church, Riccarton, but he died in 1943 from a sting to the neck that became infected. She went on to marry Jack Reuben Salas, an ENT specialist, and the couple had six children.

== Activism ==
Salas was involved with the Playcentre movement, and became that organisation's first representative on the National Council of Women. She went on to serve the latter body as its national secretary between 1976 and 1980, and its vice president between 1982 and 1986. She was president of the United Nations Association of New Zealand, and vice president of the World Federation of United Nations Associations. For nine years she was a member of the public advisory committee for disarmament and arms control. Salas was a New Zealand committee member for the Council for Security Cooperation in the Asia Pacific, and she was also an honorary vice president of the New Zealand Institute of International Affairs.

Salas was active in the peace movement throughout her life, and advocated for improvements in the status, safety and security of women. In 1982 she represented New Zealand at the United Nations session on disarmament and at the Women of the World Working for Peace conference in New York.

== Honours and awards ==
In the 1982 Queen's Birthday Honours, Salas was appointed a Companion of the Queen's Service Order for community service. She was made a Dame Commander of the Order of the British Empire, for services to the community, six years later in the 1988 Queen's Birthday Honours. She also received the Queen Elizabeth II Silver Jubilee Medal in 1977, and the New Zealand 1990 Commemoration Medal.

== Death ==
Salas died at Sprott House in the Wellington suburb of Karori on 26 January 2017, less than two weeks before her 95th birthday.
