= Skjelderup =

Skjelderup is a Norwegian surname. Notable people with the surname include:

- Jacob Worm Skjelderup (1804–1863), Norwegian politician
- Michael Skjelderup (1769–1852), Norwegian physician

== See also ==
- Skjellerup
