= Valdemar Skellerup =

New Zealand industrialist

Sir Valdemar Reid Skellerup CBE (also Skjellerup, 22 December 1907 – 11 June 1982) was a New Zealand industrialist.

Skellerup was born in Christchurch in 1907. His father was George Skellerup (1881–1955), the founder of rubber manufacturing company Skellerup Industries. His mother was Elizabeth, née Reid. His father was born in Australia but the family stemmed from Denmark, with his father's birth name including a silent "j" that he dropped from the name at some point. On their birth certificates, the original spelling Skjellerup was used for all five siblings born between 1907 (Valdemar was the oldest) and 1918 (his brother Peter was the youngest). The three middle siblings were girls. (Note: The birth certificate registration numbers are 1908/2923 (Valdemar), 1911/23121 (Gwenda Margaret), 1915/5460 (Margery Berk), 1916/1606 (Winifred Elizabeth), and 1918/4920 (Peter)) Frank Skjellerup, an Australian amateur astronomer, was his uncle. Skellerup received his education at Ashburton High School and then at the University of Canterbury. In 1933, he married Marion C. Bates; they were to have one son and three daughters.

Skellerup had been involved in his father's companies from a young age. He took over as joint managing director in 1955 upon his father's death alongside his brother Peter. In 1960, he lived in the Christchurch suburb of Shirley.

In the 1973 Queen's Birthday Honours, Skellerup was appointed Commander of the Order of the British Empire, for philanthropy and services to industry. In the 1980 New Year Honours, he was made a Knight Bachelor, for services to industry and the community.

Skellerup died on 11 June 1982.
