= C/1927 X1 (Skjellerup–Maristany) =

Great Comet of 1927

C/1927 X1 (Skjellerup–Maristany) (Great Comet of 1927)
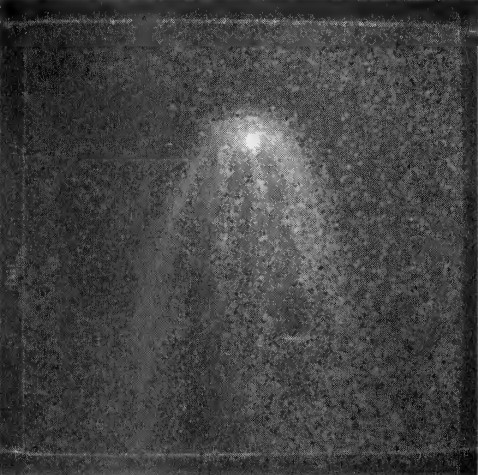
- Drawing of Comet Skjellerup–Maristany by Vesto Slipher on 17 December 1927

Discovery
- Discovered by: John Francis Skjellerup; Edmundo Maristany
- Discovery date: 6 December 1927

Designations
- Alternative designations: 1927 IX, 1927k

Orbital characteristics
- Epoch: 26 December 1927 (JD 2425240.5)
- Aphelion: 2,202 AU
- Perihelion: 0.1761 AU
- Semi-major axis: 1,101 AU
- Eccentricity: 0.9998
- Orbital period: ~36,600 years
- Inclination: 85.1°
- Last perihelion: 18 December 1927

Physical characteristics
- Mean radius: 1.67 km (1.04 mi) (Note: Calculated mean radius using the formula: $\log_{10}\,(\,R\,)\ =\;0.9 +\;0.13 (\,H\,)$ Where $\,H\,$ is the comet's absolute total magnitude (M1))
- Comet total magnitude (M1): 5.2
- Apparent magnitude: –0.5 (1927 apparition)

Comet Skjellerup–Maristany, formally designated C/1927 X1, 1927 IX, and 1927k, was a long-period comet which became very bright in 1927. This great comet was observable to the naked eye for about 32 days.

== Observational history ==
It was independently discovered by amateur astronomers John Francis Skjellerup in Australia on 28 November 1927 and Edmundo Maristany in Argentina on 6 December 1927, and noted for its strong yellow appearance and the detection of emission from sodium atoms.

The comet was already visible with the naked eye upon discovery and was moving towards the Sun. On 3 December its apparent magnitude was reported to be +3 and its tail was 3 degrees long. Forward scattering of light on 15–16 December 1927 allowed the comet to be seen during daylight if the observer blocked the Sun, C/1927 X1 passed only 1.4° from the Sun on 15 December 1927. It was reported many times brighter than Venus on December 16, so bright that it could be measured spectrographically in daylight. On 17.9 December the magnitude of the comet was reported to be -2. The comet passed perihelion 18 December and was located 10 degrees away from the Sun. After perihelion the comet stayed in the morning twilight for several weeks as it faded. George van Biesbroeck reported that the comet could no longer be detected with certainty without optical aid on 23 December. A long but faint tail up to 40 degrees was visible in the sky between 29 December and 2 January.

Comet Skjellerup–Maristany has been more than 105 AU (15.7 billion km) from the Sun since 2010. It was mentioned in J. R. R. Tolkien's book Letters From Father Christmas.
