= New Zealand Liberal Party (1962) =

- Leader: Ronald MacGregor Hutton-Potts
- President: Walter Ellis Christie
- Founded: 1962
- Ideology: Classical Liberalism; Laissez-faire
- Political position: Centre-right
- Colours: Yellow

The New Zealand Liberal Party was a classical-liberal party that was formed to stand candidates in the 1963 general election. It was defunct after the 1966 general election, which it did not stand candidates for.

== History ==
At the election, "the Liberals, with over twenty candidates, collected only 1 per cent of the vote, although they caused the National Party a little concern by drawing financial support from some farmers in Canterbury." The Liberal Party argued the National government was not doing enough to promote private enterprise, but made little influence on the election and did not fulfill expectations that they would split the National Party's vote.

The Liberal Party had five main policy platforms it campaigned on:

1. The abolition of personal income tax, death duties and gift duties
2. The reduction of government spending by £50 million
3. Proposed increases in personal savings, including compulsory saving by those under 21 years old
4. The discontinuation of monopolies
5. To establish an upper house of parliament and a written constitution

The number of candidates put forward was 23, and they attracted 10,339 votes (0.9%). The electorates were: Auckland Central, Awarua, Eastern Maori, Eden, Hamilton, Hauraki, Invercargill, Mount Albert, North Shore, Onehunga, Otaki, Palmerston North, Piako, Raglan, Remuera, Roskill, Selwyn, Tamaki, Waimarino, Waipa, Waitakere, Waitomo and Wallace. The highest number of votes for any Liberal candidate was Invercargill (1,064 votes), then Wallace (828 votes). Invercargill was contested by the party leader Ronald MacGregor Hutton-Potts. Every single Liberal candidate lost their deposit.

In 1965 one of the founders of the party and chairman of the party executive, businessman Alexander Athol Mackintosh, led a small ticket of three Liberal candidates for the Christchurch City Council at that years civic election. All were unsuccessful.

The Liberal Party also contemplated standing a candidate at the 1967 Fendalton by-election, though the party executive ultimately decided against it.

As a 64 year-old, former party president Walter Ellis Christie, contested the seat of Roskill as an independent candidate at the 1990 general election on a similar policy platform to the Liberal Party.
