= Alexia Pickering =

Alexia Pickering CNZM QSO JP
- Born: Alexia Helen Jean Rae Pilcher; 20 May 1930; Petone, New Zealand
- Died: 27 April 2017 (aged 86); Wellington, New Zealand
- Known for: Advocacy for people with disabilities
- Spouses: Neville Pickering (died 1988); George Matthewson (m. 1999, divorced)
- Children: 4

Alexia Helen Jean Rae Pickering CNZM QSO JP (née Pilcher; 20 May 1930 – 27 April 2017) was a New Zealand disabilities rights campaigner.

== Early life and family ==
She was born with spina bifida in Petone in 1930. Aged 10 months, she was operated on by orthopaedic surgeon Alexander Gillies, and they became life-long friends. Her early education was at home or via correspondence. She was head girl at Patea School and won a scholarship to St Mary's School in Stratford, but they would not take her because of her disability. She attended Hawera High School instead.

In the 1950s, she married Neville Pickering, who went on serve as a Member of Parliament (1957–1960) and mayor of Christchurch (1971–1974). The couple adopted three children before having one of their own, having believed that Alexia was unable to bear children.

== Disability rights advocacy ==
During her husband's political career, Pickering began to speak out about issues of access for people with disabilities, drawing on her personal experiences. Following her husband's death in 1988, Pickering became director of the Disability Resource Centre, and her guidebook, Accessible New Zealand: a complete visitor guide for the traveller with restricted mobility, was published in 2000. She was appointed as a justice of the peace in 1990.

Pickering served as a member of the national executive of the New Zealand Paraplegic and Physically Disabled Federation, a member of both the Rehabilitation International's Social Commission and ICTA Commission, and president of the New Zealand Federation of Disability Information Centres. She was appointed to the New Zealand Council for Recreation and Sport, and the New Zealand Building Industry Authority, and chaired the access advisory panel for the Department of Building and Housing.

She was involved in the establishment of the Barrier Free New Zealand Trust, the Laura Fergusson Trust, and the Hamilton Volunteer Centre Trust.

Pickering was a recipient of the New Zealand 1990 Commemoration Medal. In the 1996 New Year Honours, she was appointed a Companion of the Queen's Service Order for community service. She was appointed a Companion of the New Zealand Order of Merit, for services to people with disabilities, in the 2005 New Year Honours.

== Later life and death ==
Pickering remarried George Matthewson, a parliamentary messenger, in 1999. Their marriage was later dissolved. She died on 27 April 2017, aged 86, and was buried with her first husband at Memorial Park Cemetery in Christchurch.
