= David Barnes (politician) =

New Zealand politician

David Barnes MP
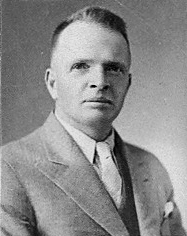

Member of the New Zealand Parliament for Waitaki
- In office 27 November 1935 – 15 October 1938
- Preceded by: John Bitchener
- Succeeded by: David Campbell Kidd

Personal details
- Born: 1895 England
- Died: 4 June 1970 (aged 74–75) New Zealand
- Party: Labour
- Children: 1

David Barnes (1895–4 June 1970) was a New Zealand politician of the Labour Party.

== Biography ==
=== Early life and career ===
Barnes was born in 1895 and educated in England before migrating to New Zealand in 1908 with his parents. After arriving he became a farmer in the North Canterbury area until 1914 when he signed up for the Canterbury Mounted Rifles Regiment in World War I. After being wounded at Gallipoli he returned to New Zealand where he became the first returned serviceman to join the pilot school at Sockburn by the Canterbury Aviation Company before returning to England to completed his pilot training. Subsequently, he served with English coastal defence forces until the end of the war. He returned to New Zealand to resume farming in North Canterbury, and later at Fairlie.

=== Member of Parliament ===
New Zealand Parliament
Years	Term	Electorate	Party
1935–1938	25th	Waitaki	Labour

In Fairlie he started a branch of the Labour Party. He was also a founding member and president of the Fairlie Crown Tenant's Association branch. He represented the Waitaki electorate from 1935 to 1938, when he was defeated by National candidate David Campbell Kidd. While in parliament he was a member of a parliamentary committee tasked with drafting the government's social security policies which later became the Social Security Act 1938.

In 1943 Barnes contested the Mid-Canterbury seat unsuccessfully.

=== Later life and death ===
After exiting parliament he was a member of the Rehabilitation Board and was then a Director of the State Advances Corporation from 1939 to 1954.

He later commanded the Home Guard in the Timaru district. In 1940 he joined the Royal New Zealand Air Force (RNZAF) in 1940, Mr Barnes was made Adjutant of the Rongatai Training School. He later toured the country as a member of the RNZAF recruiting committee. Mr Barnes retired to Christchurch after World War II. He was the Labour Party's candidate for the Christchurch Mayoralty in 1947. He finished second in a three-way contest to the sitting mayor Ernest Andrews.

Barnes died on 4 June 1970, aged 75. He was survived by his wife and daughter.

== Notes ==
New Zealand Parliament
Preceded by John Bitchener	Member of Parliament for Waitaki; 1935–1938	Succeeded by David Campbell Kidd
