= Forward scatter =

Small angle deflection of waves

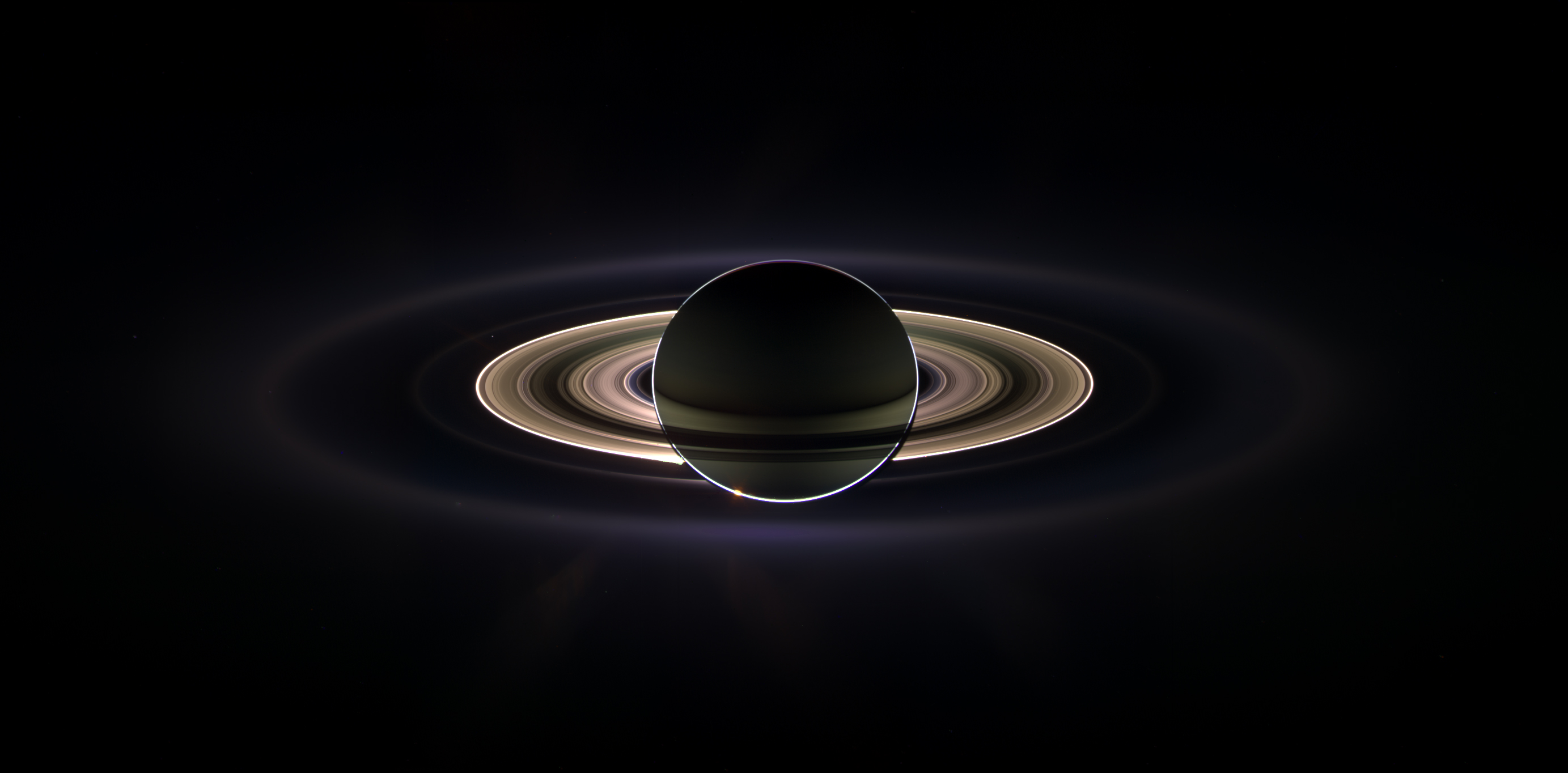
Saturn eclipses the Sun, as seen from the Cassini space probe. The forward scattering of light makes the faint outer rings more visible.

Forward scattering is the deflection of waves by small angles so that they continue to move in close to the same direction as before the scattering. It can occur with all types of waves, for instance light, ultraviolet radiation, X-rays as well as matter waves such as electrons, neutrons and even water waves. It can be due to diffraction, refraction, and low angle reflection. It almost always occurs when the wavelength of the radiation used is small relative to the features which lead to the scattering. Forward scatter is essentially the reverse of backscatter.

Many different examples exist, and there are very large fields where forward scattering dominates, in particular for electron diffraction and electron microscopy, X-ray diffraction and neutron diffraction. In these the relevant waves are transmitted through the samples. One case where there is forward scattering in a reflection geometry is reflection high-energy electron diffraction.

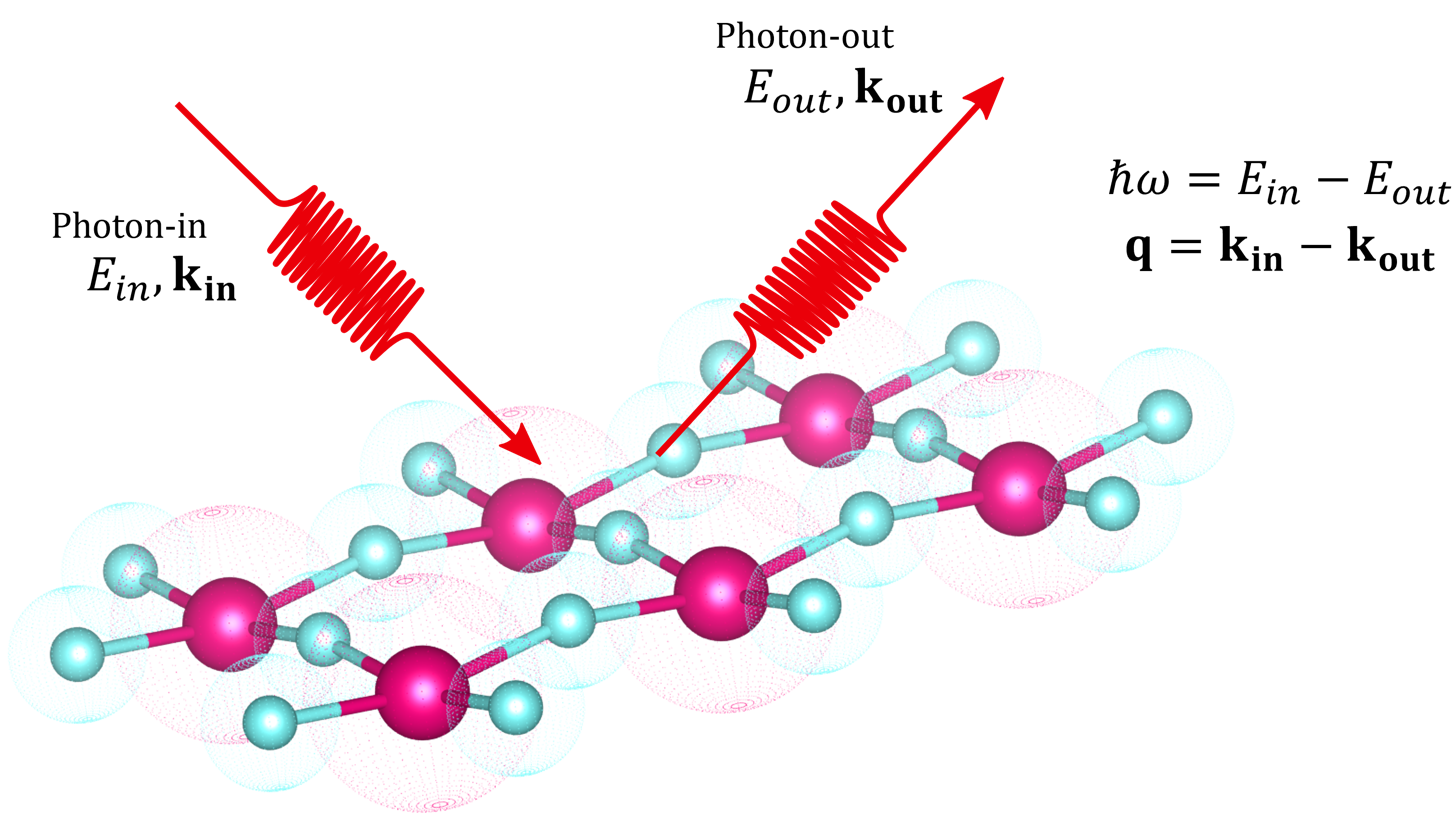
Forward scattering of a photon, with possible energy change.

== General description ==
Whenever waves encounter obstacles of any type there are changes in the direction of the waves (wave vector) by diffraction, and sometimes its energy by inelastic scattering. These processes occur for all types of waves, although how they behave varies with both their type and that of the obstacle. As illustrated in the figure, if the change in the wave vector q is fairly small the scattered wave moves in close to the same direction as the input—it has been scattered. In most cases the change in the wave vector scales inversely with the size of obstacles, so forward scattering is more common when the obstacles are large compared to the wavelength of the radiation.

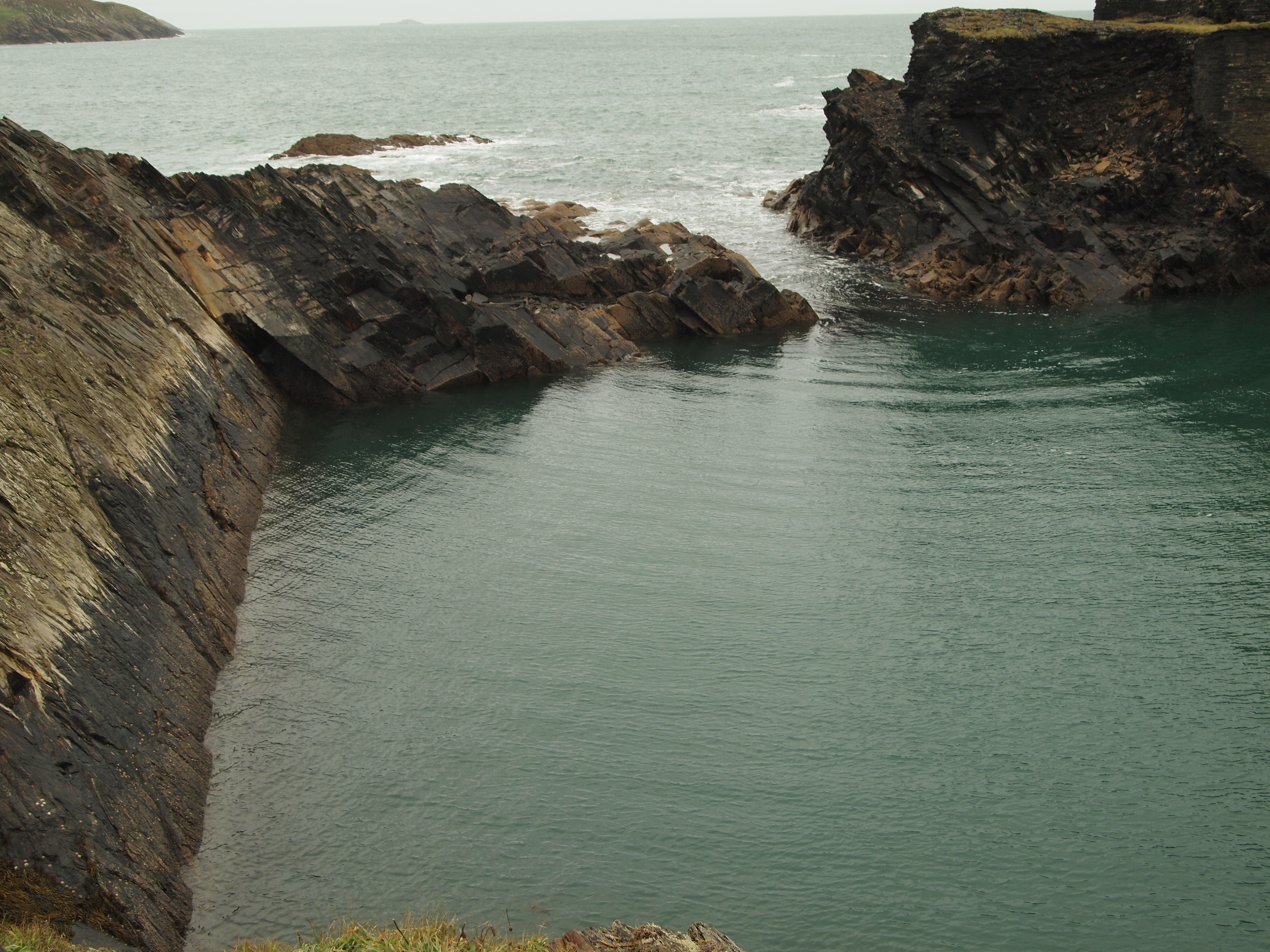
Wave diffraction at the Blue Lagoon, Abereiddy

In many cases the waves of interest have relatively small wavelengths, for instance high-energy electrons or X-rays. However, the process is very general and can also be seen when water flows through a narrow channel as shown in the figure at the Blue Lagoon.

== Comets ==
Forward scattering can make a back-lit comet appear significantly brighter because the dust and ice crystals are reflecting and enhancing the apparent brightness of the comet by scattering that light towards the observer. Comets studied forward-scattering in visible-thermal photometry include C/1927 X1 (Skjellerup–Maristany), C/1975 V1 (West), and C/1980 Y1 (Bradfield). Comets studied forward-scattering in SOHO non-thermal C3 coronograph photometry include 96P/Machholz and C/2004 F4 (Bradfield). The brightness of the great comets C/2006 P1 (McNaught) and Comet Skjellerup–Maristany near perihelion were enhanced by forward scattering.

== See also ==
- Back scattering – Reflection which reverses the direction of a wave, particle, or signal
- Elastic scattering – Particle collisions conserving kinetic energy
- Inelastic scattering – Particle scattering in which kinetic energy is not conserved
- Scattering – Range of physical processes in physics
