= Albert Orme =

Albert Frederick Orme, also known as Albie or Arapeta, (27 March 1937 – 27 November 2008) was a New Zealand rugby player, lawyer, politician, and advocate for Māori Sovereignty.

== Biography ==
Orme was born in 1937 in Te Teko, Bay of Plenty. (Ngāti Awa, Te Arawa) He later moved to Rotorua, where he attended Rotorua Boys High school. As a teenager he was later sent to board at Waitaki Boys' High School in Oamaru, where he was the only Māori student at the school. He starred in Waitaki Boys' first XV rugby team playing in the backline. While studying law, as one of three Maori students, at University of Canterbury he played in the university team as a first-five. He played provincial rugby for Canterbury from 1959 to 1962. He was selected for the New Zealand Māori team to play against France in their 1961 tour and later toured North America with the New Zealand Universities XV in 1962. While at university he was elected to the University of Canterbury Students' Association executive. After he graduated in 1967 he worked for the Public Trust Office in Christchurch.

He was elected, as the first Māori, to the Christchurch City Council, on the Labour Party ticket, in 1971. On the council he served on the museum and airport committees. He forged links with Ngāi Tahu and North Island iwi in the city and was a finalist for the Young Māori of the Year award in 1971. He was awarded a Winston Churchill Fellowship and studied international race relations in London. Based at New Zealand's High Commission offices, he met Lord Louis Mountbatten and leading members of the British legal establishment. He attended the 1972 Munich Olympics as a city council representative, exploring ideas for Christchurch hosting the 1974 Commonwealth Games. During these Games, Orme hosted the Malawi team. By the end of the council term, Orme, a passionate activist for Māori rights, found himself embroiled in a public stoush over parking fines. He suggested at the time that this seemingly mundane issue was, in fact, a quiet act of rebellion against paying for parking on land he believed was not rightfully owned by the Crown, highlighting his ongoing commitment to challenging injustices and advocating for Māori sovereignty.

After leaving the council he first began to suffer health issues but proceeded to study overseas. After returning to New Zealand he settled in Auckland, where he became involved and instrumental in Treaty issues and Māori land claims. He was also involved with Ngā Tamatoa- a Māori activist group that operated throughout the 1970s to promote Māori rights, fight racial discrimination, and confront injustices perpetrated by the New Zealand Government, particularly violations of the Treaty of Waitangi. He also did legal work, mainly for Māori and Pacific Islanders, in court on criminal matters. Orme often did not charge clients. He was also involved in the establishment of law courses in Māori land and Treaty issues at the University of Auckland.

Orme contested the Panmure electorate as a New Zealand Party candidate at the 1984 general election. He finished third out of five contenders. He was one of the party's highest polling candidates nationwide.

In later life he moved back to Rotorua. He died in Auckland where he was living with family on 27 November 2008, aged 71. He was buried in Rotorua Cemetery.

Orme is of Ngāti Awa; Ngā Tamaoki, Te Arawa; Ngāti Tarāwhai, Ngāti Whākaue, Ngāti Pikiao.

He is father to Simon Orme, Sara Orme (Photographer), Justin Macready.
