= Public Trust Office =

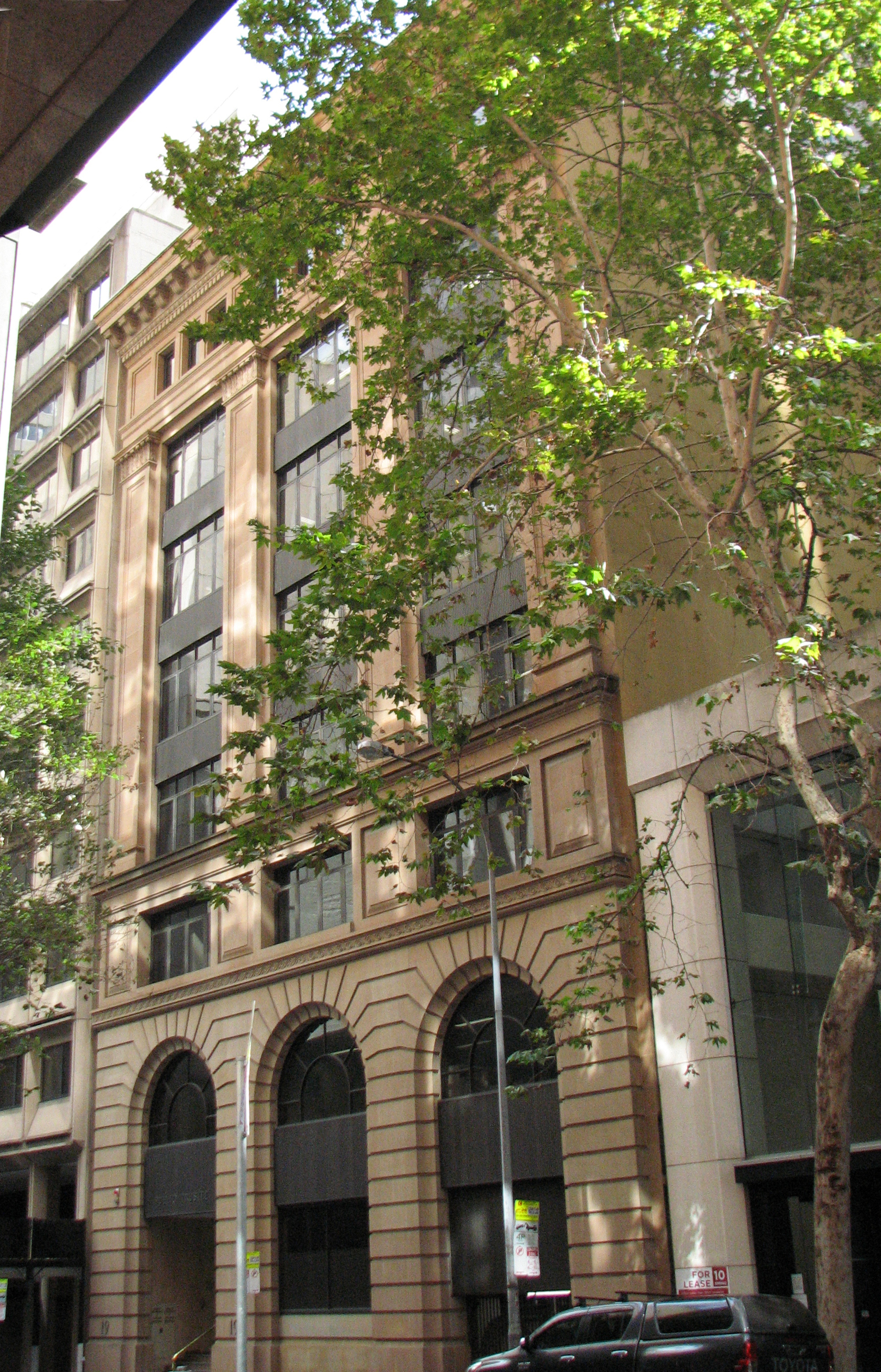
- The Public Trust Office, 19–21 O'Connell Street, Sydney, New South Wales

- Location within Sydney
- 33.8651°S 151.2093°E
- Location: 19–21 O'Connell Street, Sydney, Australia

History
- Built: 1926–

Site notes
- Architect(s): Ross & Rowe

New South Wales Heritage Register
- Official name: Public Trust Office; Rofe Chambers; Public Trustee
- Type: state heritage (built)
- Designated: 2 April 1999
- Reference no.: 1019
- Type: Office building
- Category: Government and Administration

The Public Trust Office is a heritage-listed office building at 19–21 O'Connell Street, Sydney, Australia. It was designed by Ross & Rowe and built from 1926. It is also known as the Public Trustee. It was originally known as Rofe Chambers. It was added to the New South Wales State Heritage Register on 2 April 1999.

== History ==
The Public Trust Office, first known as "Rofe Chambers", was designed in 1924 by M. E. Ross & Rowe for the law firm Alfred Rofe & Sons. It originally housed a branch of the Australian Bank of Commerce Insurance Brokers' offices on the ground floor. Above were offices for professionals including engineers and accountants. The basement was used as a staff dining room. Alterations, generally by the original architects, were carried out on floors five, six and seven between 1926 and 1931.

In 1941, there was an urgent need to find new office accommodation for the Public Trustee, and Rofe Chambers was acquired by the state government for the purpose. The Public Trust Building was officially opened by the premier, William McKell on 2 March 1942. The total cost of acquisition, alterations, and fitouts of the new offices, as certified by the Public Works Department in 1946, was 125,764/15/3 pounds.

There are no major changes recorded for the period 1940s–1950s. In 1967 alterations were carried out to the ground floor. In 1971, the building underwent major refurbishment which substantially removed the original interiors and left only the facade of the building intact. Further internal refurbishment was carried out in 1989.

== Description ==
The Public Trust Building is of the inter-war free classical style. The building consists of eight storeys above a basement level. The sandstone facade fronting O'Connell Street is symmetrical, with three round arches of two-storey high (ground and first floors), and unconventional order of architecture with attenuated pilasters spanning between the third and seventh floors. The second and seventh floor levels each consists of three bays of windows. The parapet is enriched with classical stone cornices and decorative embellishments. The inter-war period of this classical building is emphasised by its large metal framed windows and spandrel panels.

Initially the building has been substantially refurbished in the early 1970s and in the late 1980s, with modern office interiors consisting of plasterboard stud wall and suspended ceilings with glazed partitions predominate. The entry foyer features travertine marble cladding.

== Heritage listing ==
The building is associated with the historical development of the Public Trustee in NSW. It is of social significance because of its association with the management of estates of deceased persons. It is the first office building purchased especially to accommodate the Public Trustee and is still being used as Head Office of the organisation. The building facade contributes to the streetscape character established by former Bank of New South Wales building on the corner of Hunter and Pitt Streets. It is an example of the inter-war free classical style of architecture designed by the well known architects Ross & Rowe.

Public Trust Office was listed on the New South Wales State Heritage Register on 2 April 1999 having satisfied the following criteria.

The place has a strong or special association with a particular community or cultural group in New South Wales for social, cultural or spiritual reasons.

It is of social significance because of its association with the management of estates of deceased persons. It is the first office building purchased especially to accommodate the Public Trustee and is still being used as head office of the organisation.

== See also ==
- Australian non-residential architectural styles
