= Skellerup =

New Zealand rubber product manufacturer

Skellerup Holdings Limited
- Type: Public
- Traded as: NZX: SKL
- Industry: Manufacturing
- Headquarters: Christchurch, New Zealand

Skellerup Holdings Limited is a New Zealand manufacturer and distributor of engineered polymer products for agriculture and industrial applications. Founded by George Skellerup in 1910, the company supplies products used in dairy farming, potable water and wastewater infrastructure, construction, roofing, footwear, automotive and other specialist markets. The company operates through two divisions, Agri and Industrial, and sells products into 94 countries worldwide. In FY26, Skellerup reported revenue of NZD $390.1 million and employed 838 people globally.

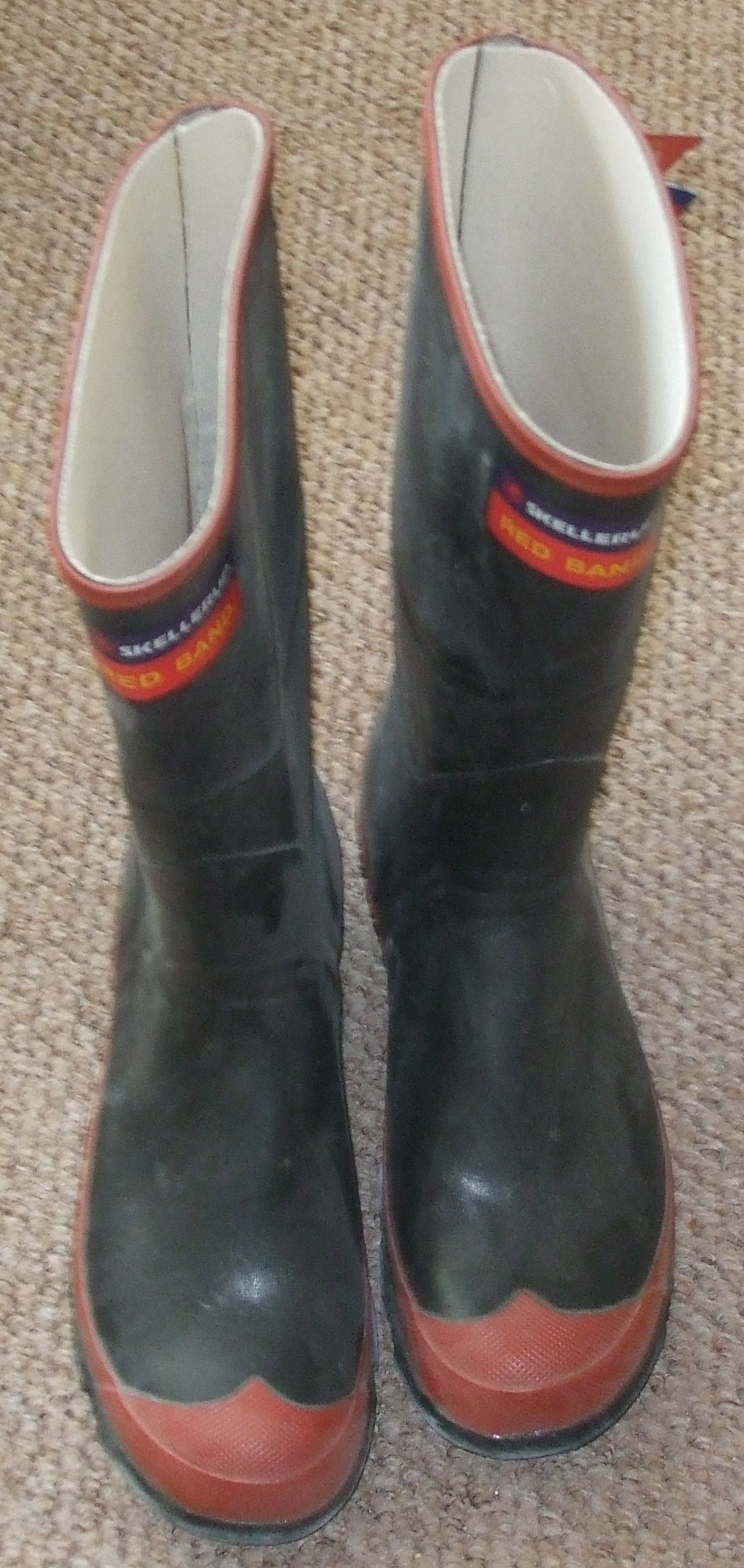
Skellerup Red Band rubber knee boots popular in New Zealand

== History ==
Skellerup was founded in 1910 by Danish immigrant George Skellerup. The company initially manufactured and distributed rubber products in New Zealand before expanding into a broader range of engineered polymer products for agricultural and industrial applications. Skellerup now operates manufacturing and distribution facilities in New Zealand, Australia, China, the United Kingdom, Italy, the Netherlands and the United States.

== Operations ==
Skellerup operates through two business divisions:

- The Agri division supplies products for the dairy industry including milking liners, tubing, calf-feeding products and other dairy consumables. The division also manufactures and distributes agricultural, safety and lifestyle footwear.
- The Industrial division manufactures and distributes engineered products used in potable water and wastewater infrastructure, roofing and construction, automotive, electrical, health and hygiene, sport and leisure, and other industrial applications.

== Financial performance ==
For the financial year ended 30 June 2026, Skellerup reported revenue of NZ$390.1 million, an increase from NZ$353.5 million in the previous financial year. Net profit after tax was NZ$67.7 million, while normalised earnings before interest and tax (EBIT) were NZ$89.3 million. Operating cash flow for FY26 was NZ$83.6 million and the company declared total dividends of 30.0 cents per share. The company employed 838 people globally and sold products to customers in 94 countries during FY26.

== Leadership ==
The company's chair is John Strowger and the chief executive officer is Graham Leaming.
