= James Hay (philanthropist) =

New Zealand businessman, local politician and philanthropist

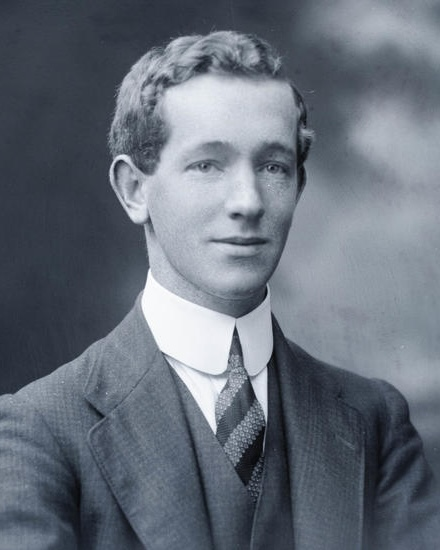
Hay, c. 1914

Sir James Lawrence Hay OBE (17 May 1888 – 26 March 1971) was a New Zealand businessman, local politician and philanthropist.

== Early life and family ==
James Hay was born in Lawrence, South Otago, New Zealand, on 17 May 1888 to Scottish parents, Isabella McLean and her blacksmith husband, William Hay. William Hay was killed in an accident when James was aged 7. He received his education at Lawrence District High School, until age 13 when he left school to support his family. He worked for drapers in rural Otago and South Canterbury and eventually joined J. Ballantyne and Co, Christchurch's leading department store then moved to management in Beath's. His brother was judge and Lower Hutt mayor Ernst Hay.

Hay married Davidina Mertel Gunn, a New Zealand Nurse, in England in 1917 while running YMCA support services for 20,000 New Zealand Division troops in the Middle East and Europe. He stayed with YMCA after the war as their general secretary then took his organising ability to Ballantyne's in 1925.

== Hay's department store ==
Hay joined an Auckland manufacturer and wholesaler to create an entirely new Christchurch retail outlet. They built a new store at the corner of Gloucester Street and Colombo Street, and opened it in 1929. Hay's organising skills and flair for publicity, elephants were hired to advertise a sale, helped the new store become profitable but in 1933 in the Great Depression the Auckland parent company collapsed. He managed to find enough financial support to buy out the former parent and raise the capital to pay for it by public subscription. Branches were opened in Otago and the West Coast. Hay's built Christchurch's first shopping centre in Upper Riccarton in 1960 and Northlands in 1970. Haywrights, the nation's second largest department store chain, was the result of a merger with stock and station agents Wright Stephenson & Co. Haywrights is now Farmers.

== Local politics and community activities ==
Hay was first elected onto Christchurch City Council in the 1944 local election. He served until 1953, when he unsuccessfully challenged the incumbent mayor, Robert Macfarlane, for the mayoralty. When an incorporated society, Town Hall Promotion Inc., was formed for the promotion of a Christchurch Town Hall, he became its first president.

== Death and legacy ==
Hay died on 26 March 1971 at his home in Christchurch, and was buried in Waimairi Cemetery. The town hall was opened some 18 months after his death, and the second largest performance space was named the James Hay Theatre in his honour. His son, Hamish Hay, was later the Christchurch mayor for 15 years.

== Honours ==
Hay was appointed a Member of the Order of the British Empire as of 1 January 1918 for services as Young Men's Christian Association secretary to the New Zealand Division in Egypt and France, and was promoted to Officer of the same order in the 1918 King's Birthday Honours only a few months later in connection with the same work. In 1935, he was awarded the King George V Silver Jubilee Medal, and in 1953 he was awarded the Queen Elizabeth II Coronation Medal. In the 1961 Queen's Birthday Honours, Hay was appointed a Knight Bachelor, for civic and charitable services.

In 2000, Hay was posthumously inducted into the New Zealand Business Hall of Fame.
