= Neville Pickering =

New Zealand politician (1923–1988)

Neville Pickering MBE JP
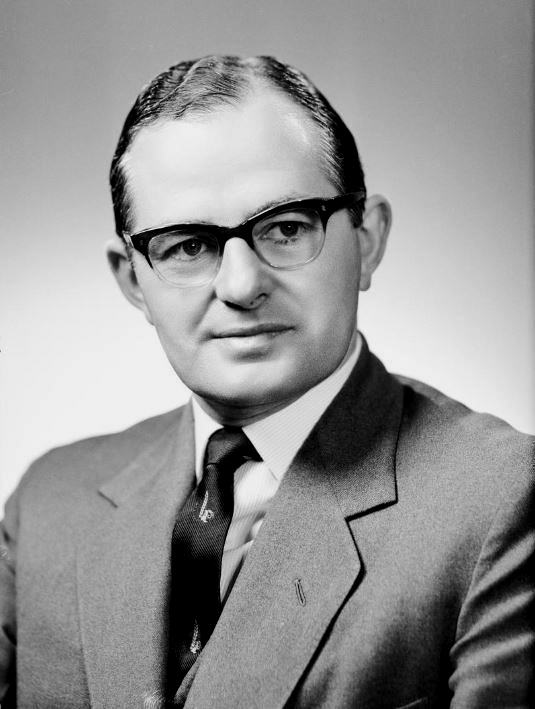
- Pickering in 1964

41st Mayor of Christchurch
- In office 9 October 1971 – 12 October 1974
- Deputy: Robert Macfarlane
- Preceded by: Ron Guthrey
- Succeeded by: Hamish Hay

Member of the New Zealand Parliament for St Albans
- In office 30 November 1957 – 31 October 1960
- Preceded by: Jack Watts
- Succeeded by: Bert Walker

Personal details
- Born: 18 November 1923 Hāwera, New Zealand
- Died: 25 June 1988 (aged 64) Wellington, New Zealand
- Resting place: Memorial Park Cemetery, Christchurch
- Party: Labour
- Spouse: Alexia Pickering
- Children: 4

Neville George Pickering MBE JP (18 November 1923 – 25 June 1988) was a New Zealand politician of the Labour Party.

== Biography ==
=== Early life ===
Pickering was born in Hāwera in 1923. He was educated at Hamilton Technical College where he was also keen sportsman. In his youth he represented both Hamilton and Bay of Plenty at cricket. He married Alexia Pickering, who would become a notable disability advocate. They adopted three children before she had another child of her own. He was also vice-president of the South Canterbury Rugby Referees' Association.

=== Political career ===
New Zealand Parliament
Years	Term	Electorate	Party
1957–1960	32nd	St Albans	Labour

In 1948, Pickering began his first posting in the Labour Party as their Southland party organiser, leading to him standing in the 1949 and 1951 elections, in the Awarua electorate, but lost against the incumbent, George Richard Herron of the National Party. From 1950 to 1952, Pickering was the business manager of the Grey River Argus, a Labour newspaper in Greymouth, before leaving for Wellington in 1953 to become an assistant research officer at Labour's head office. In 1956, he took up position as Labour's South Island organiser. In the 1954 election, he lost against Alfred Davey in the Waimate electorate. He settled in the electorate nonetheless to work for the Prudential life insurance company in Timaru.

After initially refusing nomination, Pickering stood in the 1957 election in the St Albans electorate (Labour's initial candidate Desmond J. Scott withdrew for health reasons). This time he was successful and became one of six new Labour MPs. He was defeated in the 1960 election by Bert Walker.

Following his defeat, Pickering gained employment as manager of the Atlas Rubber Company. He was later a contender for the Labour nomination at the 1962 Buller by-election, though lost the nomination race to Bill Rowling. Pickering also declared his intention to seek the Labour nomination at the 1962 Timaru by-election after Clyde Carr announced his resignation. As a former resident his intentions were welcomed and received endorsement from trade union leader Fintan Patrick Walsh. Several weeks later he withdrew his name from the race at the insistence of the chairman of the St Albans electorate who wanted to retain him in Christchurch, convinced Pickering could win the seat back in 1963. He later reconsidered after receiving "overwhelming representations" from various union and party members urging him to seek nomination. He was ultimately not selected for the nomination.

In October 1962, Pickering was elected a member of the Christchurch City Council. He served for nine years as a councillor before he was elected Mayor of Christchurch in 1971. Upon his election as mayor he resigned his job at Atlas Rubber to be Mayor full-time which he saw the role of as bringing the people closer to the council. As one of his first acts as mayor he reinstituted the wearing of full mayoral robes and regalia, which many saw as a contradiction to his status as a Labour mayor.

Pickering's time as mayor was marked by stormy debates among councillors and disagreements with officials where Pickering's style of leadership drew contrary descriptions; some describing him as a vigorous and decisive leader with keen political acumen, others saw him as arrogant. Pickering's time as mayor was not helped by the fact he was leading a largely inexperienced council. Aside from himself only two Labour council members (Durham Dowell and Robert Macfarlane) had any previous local-body experience. This became especially difficult when it came to appointing committee chairmanships which were allocated largely according to party strength and thusly several more experienced Citizens' candidates were passed over. In 1972, Pickering boycotted an Anzac Day wreath-laying at Cathedral Square, protesting against the Returned Services' Association's restrictions on who could lay wreaths.

The dominant issue during Pickering's time as mayor was Christchurch's hosting of the 1974 British Commonwealth Games. He fulfilled an election pledge to leave Hagley Park untouched and build a purpose built facility for the games athletic events, which resulted in the construction of Queen Elizabeth II Park. Pickering insisted on the construction of a permanent facility for the city to have after the games' completion. This caused some concern by the games organising committee, who worried that the facilities might not be built to meet the deadlines and/or quality standards, though they were both met comfortably. In recognition to his contribution to the games, Pickering was given the honorary title of "President of the Tenth Commonwealth Games".

In 1974, Pickering was defeated for the mayoralty by Hamish Hay. It was a closely fought election with a large turnout. Pickering actually increased his vote share, but overall the increased voter turnout favoured Hay leading The Press to state the result was out of increased interest rather than a swing of public opinion. Pickering adopted novel campaign advertising strategies, including printed matchboxes with his face and the slogan, "The 'Bright Spark' This City Needs". Having lost the mayoralty, his wife insisted on moving back to Wellington. There, in early 1975, he was appointed by the Third Labour Government to a post with the Local Government Commission. The posting was short-lived, however, as the incoming Third National Government were to abolish the commission after winning power later that year. Following the commission's end, Pickering opened a cycle shop in Wellington.

In 1977, Pickering sought the Labour nomination for two Christchurch electorates. The first was the Lyttelton seat, but lost to Ann Hercus, soon after in the Papanui electorate, but was again beaten this time by former Eden MP Mike Moore. In the 1978 election, he stood in the Wellington Central electorate but lost against Ken Comber. Soon afterwards he stood for the Labour candidacy for the Christchurch Central seat in a 1979 by-election, but was again unsuccessful. A year later he stood for the Wellington City Council at the 1980 local elections and narrowly missed out on election. At the 1983 local elections he was a Labour candidate for the Wellington Harbour Board. Standing in the Lower Hutt constituency, he was unsuccessful. At both the 1983 and 1986 local elections he stood as a Labour candidate for a seat on the Lower Hutt City Council but was unsuccessful.

=== Later life and death ===
Pickering died on 25 June 1988 and is buried at Memorial Park Cemetery in Christchurch. His wife, who subsequently remarried, died in 2017.

== Honours and legacy ==
In the 1985 New Year Honours, Pickering was appointed a Member of the Order of the British Empire, for services to local government. Pickering Courts, a 25-unit council housing project for the elderly built in St Albans in 1978, was named in his honour. After Pickering's death, both his successor as mayor, Sir Hamish Hay, and the chairman of the organising committee for the 1974 Commonwealth Games, Sir Ron Scott, described Queen Elizabeth II Park as a memorial to Pickering and his vision.

New Zealand Parliament
Preceded by Jack Watts	Member of Parliament for St Albans; 1957–1960	Succeeded by Bert Walker
Political offices
Preceded by Ron Guthrey	Mayor of Christchurch; 1971–1974	Succeeded by Hamish Hay
