= George Skellerup =

New Zealand businessman

George Waldemar Skellerup (14 February 1881 – 5 June 1955) was a New Zealand businessman, company director and industrialist.

== Early life ==
Skjellerup was born in 1881 in Cobden, a small town in Victoria, Australia, 200 kilometres (120 mi) south-west of Melbourne. He was the 13th and final child of Margaret Williamson and Peder Jensen Skjellerup, one of his siblings being the astronomer Frank Skjellerup. His father worked as a farmer before dying in an accident when Skellerup was two years old.

== Professional life ==
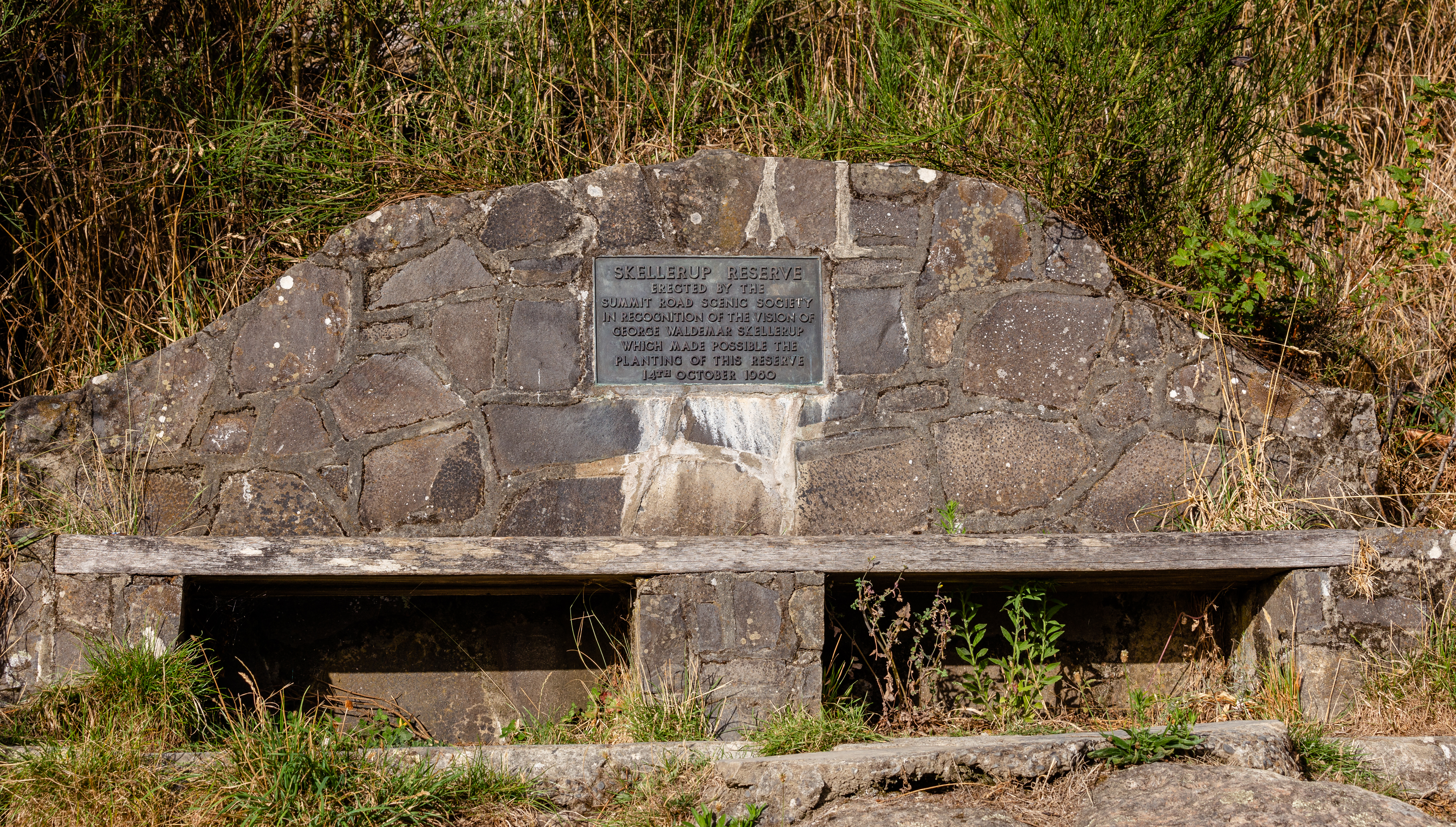
Skellerup's memorial in Christchurch

He moved to Fremantle in 1897 after leaving school aged 12 to be apprenticed to a surveyor. In Fremantle he worked under a Perth businessman before returning to Cobden in 1899. He soon left to make bicycle tyres for Dunlop Pneumatic Tyre Company. In 1902 Skjellerup sailed to New Zealand with little money, in Dunedin claiming to make the first New Zealand-made pneumatic bicycle tyres. Later he moved to Canterbury, eventually getting a job in Christchurch for the Dunlop Pneumatic Tyre Company, who he previously worked for in Melbourne.

Skellerup became self employed in 1910 with the manufacture of rubber products; his company was called the Para Rubber Company. By 1918, he had four retail outlets. After floating his company on the stock exchange in 1919, he had the capital to open further shops in both the North and South Island. Being hard hit by the Great Depression, he set up further companies in the late 1930s: the Latex Rubber Company (waterproof coats), the Empire Rubber Mills (milking machine components), and the Marathon Rubber Footwear (gumboots). He was denied a licence by the government for manufacturing car tyres. Caused by the shortages of World War II, he was asked by the government to reclaim rubber from old car tyres. There was not enough salt in the country for this venture and in 1942, he started the project to obtain salt from Lake Grassmere. He set up Skellerup Solar Salt Ltd, which later became Dominion Salt when the government took over the company.

At his death in 1955, he was succeeded by his eldest son Sir Valdemar Skellerup (1907–1982) who was chairman and joint managing director of Skellerup Industries for 26 years.
