= Frank Skjellerup =

Australian astronomer (1875–1952)

John Francis Skjellerup (a.k.a. James Francis Skjellerup; 16 May 1875 – 6 January 1952) was an Australian amateur astronomer who spent two decades working as a telegraphist in South Africa.

His father Peder Jensen Skjellerup was Danish and died when he was young; his mother was Margaret Williamson, born in England. He was born in Cobden, Victoria, Australia, the tenth of thirteen children. His youngest brother, George Skellerup (who dropped the silent "j" from his surname later in life), became a successful industrialist in New Zealand.

Trained as a telegraphist, Skjellerup went to South Africa when that country needed telegraphists after the Second Boer War; 18 telegraphists left Australia on 21 February 1900 on the SS Australasian for Cape Town. Apparently, he was an excellent golfer as well as an astronomer. He married South African Mary Peterson and returned with her to Australia in 1923 where they settled in Melbourne; she died in 1950 and there were no children. He lived in the Melbourne suburb of Oakleigh and died in his hometown on 6 January 1952.

Skjellerup took up astronomy in South Africa. There was no family history in science, let alone astronomy, and Skjellerup was unable to establish a family connection to the Danish astronomer Hans Schjellerup (1827–1887). In 1912, he was a foundation member of the Cape Astronomical Association. He discovered or co-discovered various comets in both South Africa and Australia, including the periodic comet 26P/Grigg–Skjellerup in South Africa and the very bright Skjellerup–Maristany (C/1927 X1) (visible mostly from the Southern Hemisphere) in Australia. In addition to comets, he was also a variable star observer.
