= Hamish Hay =

New Zealand politician (1927–2008)

Sir Hamish Hay
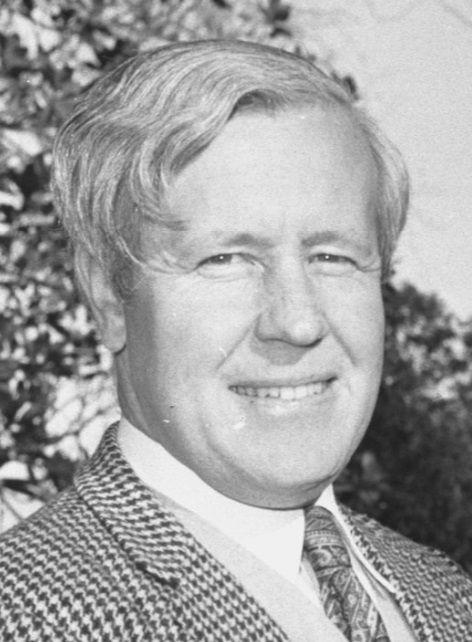
- Hay in 1971

42nd Mayor of Christchurch
- In office 12 October 1974 – 14 October 1989
- Deputy: See list: Peter Skellerup (1974–1980); Rex Lester (1980–1983); Maurice Carter (1983–1989)
- Preceded by: Neville Pickering
- Succeeded by: Vicki Buck

Personal details
- Born: Hamish Grenfell Hay; 8 December 1927 Christchurch, New Zealand
- Died: 7 September 2008 (aged 80)
- Spouse: Judith Leicester Gill (m. 1955)
- Relations: James Hay (father); David Hay (brother); Laurie Salas (sister); Ernst Hay (uncle)
- Children: 5

Sir Hamish Grenfell Hay (8 December 1927 – 7 September 2008) was a New Zealand politician. He served as mayor of Christchurch for fifteen years, from 1974 to 1989, and is the city's longest-serving mayor.

== Early life and family ==
Hay was one of four children of philanthropist Sir James Hay; David was his identical twin brother. He was educated at St Andrew's College from 1940 to 1944, and became an accounting clerk in 1945. In 1947, he joined the staff of Hay's, a department store, which was founded by his father and later became a publicly listed company. He became deputy managing director of the company in 1962, a position he held until 1974, when Hay's Ltd was merged with Wright Stephenson & Co. Hay retired from his business interests when he became the Mayor of Christchurch in 1974.

His engagement to Judith Leicester Gill was announced in February 1955; at the time he lived in Riccarton and she lived in Sumner. They were married three months later at Christchurch on 14 May 1955. They were to have five children.

== Political career ==
Hay entered local politics in 1959, when he stood as a candidate for the Christchurch City Council. Topping the poll, he went on to serve as a councillor for five consecutive terms. Like his father, he was a strong proponent of a town hall (as a performing arts centre) for Christchurch. He had been involved in the 'Town Hall Promotion' lobbying organisation, serving as the chairman of its finance committee from 1958. After his election as a Councillor, he continued to press for a town hall, and was instrumental in achieving that goal, eventually chairing the Town Hall Committee, which oversaw the construction of the Christchurch Town Hall, which opened in 1972. The second largest auditorium in the town hall, the James Hay Theatre, is named after his father. During his final term as a councillor, Christchurch hosted the 1974 British Commonwealth Games.

He stood for mayor in the election of 1974, defeating Labour incumbent Neville Pickering. He went on to become Christchurch's longest-serving mayor, holding the position for five consecutive terms.

Hay retired as Mayor in 1989 for health reasons. Victoria Street through Victoria Square was closed towards the end of his mayoralty for the square's redevelopment, and the Victoria Bridge was renamed Hamish Hay Bridge in his honour. He was succeeded by Vicki Buck. He published his autobiography, Hay Days, in the year of his retirement from the mayoralty.

In 1995, Hay returned to the political scene, representing Christchurch North on the Canterbury Regional Council until 2001.

Hay served for some years as chairman of the New Zealand Museums Trust, which oversaw the construction of New Zealand's national museum Te Papa, and as deputy chairman of the Charles Upham Trust.

== Honours ==
Hay was made a Knight Bachelor in the 1982 Queen's Birthday Honours.

Judith, Lady Hay, was appointed a Companion of the Queen's Service Order (QSO) for community service in the 1987 New Year Honours. In 1993, she was awarded the New Zealand Suffrage Centennial Medal. In the 1998 Birthday Honours, she was made a Companion of the New Zealand Order of Merit (CNZM) for services to the community.

== Later life ==
Having retired from public office in 2001, Hay began suffering from Alzheimer's disease. He died in September 2008, aged 80. His funeral service was held at Knox Church. Lady Hay moved to her family home in Akaroa after the 2011 Christchurch earthquake and lived there until she started to need care. She died on 26 December 2014.

== Bibliography ==
- Hay, Hamish (1989). Hay Days. Christchurch: Caxton Press. ISBN 0908563310.

Political offices
Preceded by Neville Pickering	Mayor of Christchurch; 1974–1989	Succeeded by Vicki Buck
