= Ron Guthrey =

New Zealand politician (1916–2008)

Ron Guthrey OBE MC
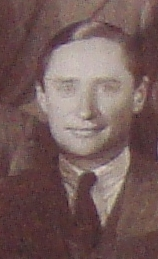
- Guthrey in 1950

40th Mayor of Christchurch
- In office 1968–1971
- Preceded by: George Manning
- Succeeded by: Neville Pickering

Personal details
- Born: 15 January 1916 Rawene, New Zealand
- Died: 8 September 2008 (aged 92) Christchurch, New Zealand
- Spouse: Mary Guthrey
- Awards: Military Cross

Military service
- Allegiance: New Zealand
- Branch/service: New Zealand Army
- Rank: Second Lieutenant
- Unit: 20th Battalion
- Battles/wars: World War II; Operation Crusader

Albert Ronald Guthrey OBE MC (15 January 1916 – 8 September 2008) was a New Zealand local politician. He served as a Christchurch City Councillor for 22 years before being elected Mayor of Christchurch. He was a World War II veteran and he and his family were (and still are) well-known business operators in Christchurch.

== Early life ==
Guthrey was born in Rawene, Hokianga on 15 January 1916. He attended Waitaki Boys' High School. He was an entrepreneur from a young age, as shown by his insurance scheme for caning. Guthrey charged a shilling a term and paid out a penny per whack. The insurance scheme folded when a number of boarders staged a sleep in and were disciplined accordingly. He saved himself by walking into town, buying a case of small apples, and because there was no tuck shop at school, was able to sell them at 100% mark-up.

== Military service ==
Guthrey was a member of the New Zealand 20th Battalion during World War II. The battalion left Lyttelton on 5 January 1940 for Egypt.

In November 1941 Guthrey's battalion was part of the New Zealand 4th Infantry Brigade in the 2nd New Zealand Division, he was the second lieutenant commanding the Bren Gun Carrier platoon. For a series of actions on 22 November, 23 November and on 25 November, he was recommended for the Military Cross by his battalion commander, Lieutenant-Colonel Howard Kippenberger. Kippenberger praised Guthrey's "skill and dash" on the Bardia Road on 22 November, and called Guthey's flank attack on Bir Cleta on 23 November "probably decisive"; but most praise was reserved for his rescue of the crew of another Bren Gun Carrier under heavy artillery fire on 25 November. A few days later, during the Battle of Belhamed on 1 December 1941, Guthrey was wounded and lost a leg. He lay on the battlefield until a German burial party in a captured New Zealand truck found him and took him to a hospital. His MC was duly gazetted on 20 January 1942. He did not learn of it until some time later when his parents sent him a newspaper clipping containing this news.

== Political career ==
Guthrey contested the Christchurch South electorate in the 1943 election for the National Party and came a distant second to the incumbent, Labour's Robert Macfarlane. Guthrey was a Christchurch city councillor from the 1944 local election to 1968, and served as mayor from 1968 to 1971. He was appointed an Officer of the Order of the British Empire in the 1968 Queen's Birthday Honours, for services to local government. He was strong proponent of the Lyttelton road tunnel, and of the Christchurch International Airport. He chaired the Airport Committee at the time of the opening of the new terminal building in 1960. Ron Guthrey Road near the airport is named in commemoration of his influence on the airport's development.

He championed the opening up of Hagley Park through the Armagh Street bridge and supported the development of the Botanic Gardens car park, and implemented the "toast rack" (an electrically powered cart with commentary for Botanic Gardens tours). He was responsible for the motorway development (Brougham Street), the first flyover (at the Colombo Street-Moorhouse Avenue intersection), the first parking building, the saving of Mona Vale as a public park for the citizens, and the beginning of local body amalgamation.

He was also responsible for the introduction of the one-way street system.

=== Controversies ===
Guthrey is remembered for two main controversies.

The major controversy is the "road through the park proposal", which would have seen Harper Avenue diverted to connect with Salisbury Street through North Hagley Park. Work on the deviation began in 1970. The outcry from opponents to the scheme and the 1971 local body election result put a stop to the work. Guthrey lost the mayoralty to Neville Pickering, who stopped the works. Peter Skellerup, a Christchurch City Councillor from 1958 to 1980, was parks and recreation chairman at that time. Skellerup fought against the scheme and took great satisfaction from his victory in this battle.

The other controversy occurred when he removed a placard from the Cenotaph monument in Cathedral Square on Anzac Day, 1970. It had been placed by the Progressive Youth Movement, and read "to the victims of fascism". He condemned the act as an insult to the war dead.

== Life outside politics ==
After having lost a leg in the war, he returned to New Zealand and continued to play sports (tennis and golf).

An article in the Christchurch Press described him as a "go-getter from way back" with "a list of accomplishments that fill a book". The Guthrey family is a well-known Christchurch family, having established Guthrey Travel and Guthrey Coachlines, among other businesses.

Established in 2001, Paralympics New Zealand recognises individuals who have given outstanding service to the organisation and Paralympic sport by awarding them a Paralympics New Zealand Order of Merit, which Guthrey honoured in the inaugural year for his contribution of service to the Paralympic movement, replacing his life membership. He was a vice president and a Foundation Representative of the Finance Committee of the New Zealand Paraplegic & Physically Disabled Federation from 1978 to 1986.

On 8 September 2008, Ron Guthrey and his wife Mary died within 90 minutes of each other. Mary Guthrey had been sick for some time and died at 8:45 pm Ron Guthrey died at 10:15 pm, only 5 minutes after having been told that his wife had died. Their son Peter Guthrey described them as a very close couple: "They just lived for each other. Mum had a stroke some time ago and I think dad was just hanging in there for her. When she went it was like dad decided it was time to go too."

Son of Ron is John Guthrey, famously known for his outspoken character, and his controversial cardboard coffins.

== Works ==
- Dare to achieve: an autobiography (1997), ISBN 0-473-04801-9

Political offices
Preceded by George Manning	Mayor of Christchurch; 1968–1971	Succeeded by Neville Pickering
