= George Manning (New Zealand politician) =

New Zealand politician

Sir George Manning CMG
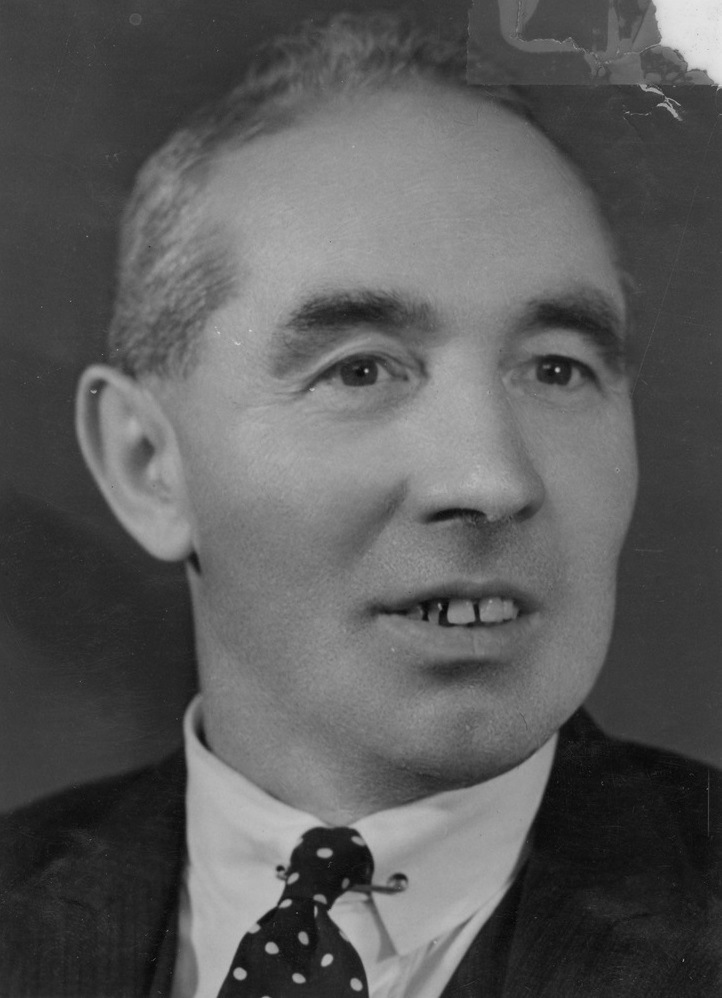
- George Manning in 1938

39th Mayor of Christchurch
- In office 1958–1968
- Preceded by: Robert Macfarlane
- Succeeded by: Ron Guthrey

Personal details
- Born: 11 February 1887 Gowerton, Wales
- Died: 29 December 1976 (aged 89) Christchurch, New Zealand
- Party: Labour
- Spouse: Sarah Edith Willmore (m. 1923)
- Children: one son

Sir George Manning CMG (11 February 1887 – 29 December 1976) was Mayor of Christchurch from 1958 to October 1968, when he retired. He served a total of 34 years on the Christchurch City Council.

== Biography ==
=== Early life and career ===
Manning was born in Gowerton, Wales, on 11 February 1887. He was the son of Richard Manning (a steel worker) and Sarah Davies. Aged 12, he won a scholarship to attend Gowerton School, but he left after 15 months in order to enter work. At age 14, he became a steel worker like his father. In 1907 he attended his first union meeting at a local pub and joined both the General Labourers' Union and Independent Labour Party. beginning a lifetime association with the labour movement.

Together with a friend he emigrated to Christchurch, New Zealand, in 1910. He said many years later that the working conditions were hard for contemporary workers to believe and frequently said that if there was one "black spot" on the history of Great Britain it would be the working conditions of the nineteenth century.

His first job upon arrival was at the New Zealand Railways Department shoveling coal. Shortly afterwards he entered the employment of the local drainage board digging ditches. He was then taken on by the Government Life Insurance Office for a three-month probationary period as an insurance officer before being offered a position with the Christchurch Tramway Board in 1911 as a conductor on the Sumner line. He then joined the Tramway Workers' Union.

He married Scottish-born Sarah Edith Willmore at the Trinity Congregational Church, Christchurch Central City, on 11 October 1923. He was involved in a multitude of clubs and community groups including the Cambrian Society, the board of governors of the University of Canterbury, the Adult Cerebral Palsy Society (of which he was a life member and patron) and the Victory Park Board.

=== Local politics ===
Manning stood unsuccessfully for Christchurch City Council in 1917 and 1919 as a Labour Party candidate. In 1920, he got offered a position as organising secretary of the Canterbury Workers' Educational Association (WEA) on the condition that he abstained from political office. This restriction was lifted in 1925. He served WEA from February 1921 to 1948, and a room at the WEA building in Gloucester Street is dedicated to Manning. Through WEA classes he took a degree course at University of Canterbury and eventually earned a Master of Arts majoring in economics.

He was elected onto Christchurch City Council in 1927 and served one term until 1929. He was again successful in a 1936 by-election and served a continuous 32 years, first as councillor (until 1958) and then mayor. In 1945, there was an undertaking to widen Burnside Road that connected the city with the aerodrome in Harewood and dedicate it as a memorial to fallen airmen. As Burwood Road was located outside of the city boundary, being the responsibility of Waimairi and Paparua county councils, Manning opposed the city council financing much of the proposal, but the scheme went ahead and the road is today known as Memorial Avenue.

He also served as a member of the Christchurch Transport Board from 1937 to 1951 (including ten years as chairman) and was also a member of the Lyttelton Harbour Board for several terms.

=== Mayor of Christchurch ===
Manning served as Deputy Mayor from 1950 to 1958, and was elected as Mayor in 1958. In 1959, he was re-elected as mayor despite not a single Labour councillor being returned alongside him. This was interpreted as a testament to Manning's personal popularity which came to be regarded as above party politics despite a lifelong affiliation with Labour.

In 1966 he led a delegation to bid for the hosting rights for the 1970 Commonwealth Games which, while unsuccessful, laid the groundwork for Christchurch being awarded the 1974 Commonwealth Games. In the 1968 election, he did not stand as a candidate again, but was re-elected to the Lyttelton Harbour Board for one final term before retiring.

In 1953, Manning was awarded the Queen Elizabeth II Coronation Medal. In the 1960 Queen's Birthday Honours, he was appointed a Companion of the Order of St Michael and St George, for services to education and local government. Manning was appointed a Knight Bachelor in the 1967 Queen's Birthday Honours, for public services, especially to education and local government.

=== National politics ===
Manning stood for the Labour Party in the 1943 election in the Christchurch North electorate, but lost against Sidney Holland. He was also set to stand there in the cancelled 1941 general election. He stood as a candidate for the Labour nomination for the 1947 Avon by-election, but lost to John Mathison. He then contested the St Albans electorate in the 1949 election, but was unsuccessful against Jack Watts.

=== Later life and death ===
For his contributions to adult education, the University of Canterbury awarded him an honorary doctorate (LLD) in 1972.

From 1973, onwards Manning was mostly restricted to a private hospital as a result of failing health. He died in Christchurch on 29 December 1976, survived by his wife and their son Penrhy. His wife died in 1998.

Political offices
Preceded by Robert Macfarlane	Mayor of Christchurch; 1958–1968	Succeeded by Ron Guthrey
