= 1989 Christchurch City Council election =

Local election in New Zealand

- 14 October 1989
- Turnout: 121,680 (60.56%)
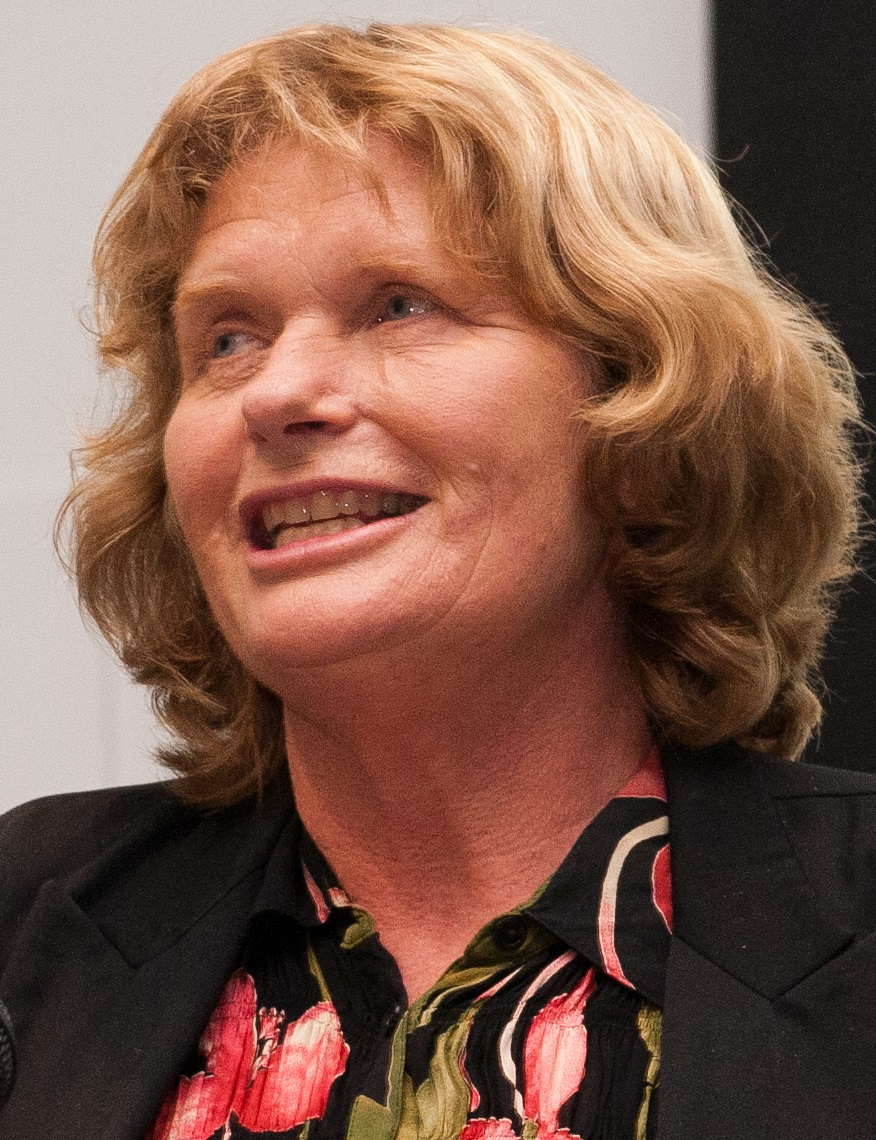

Candidate	Vicki Buck	Morgan Fahey	Margaret Murray
Party	Independent	United Citizens	Christchurch Action
Popular vote	63,824	30,891	25,666
Percentage	52.45	25.39	21.09
Mayor before election
Hamish Hay
Christchurch Citizens' Association
Elected mayor
Vicki Buck
Independent
- Councillors
- All 24 seats on the City Council; 13 seats needed for a majority
Party	Leader	Vote %	Seats	+/–
United Citizens	Dennis Rich	30.49	7	−3
Labour	Alex Clark, succeeded by David Close (Note: Alex Clark was the Labour Party leader, but he resigned from the party within a week of the election to become an independent.)	21.62	6	−3
Christchurch Action	Margaret Murray	26.16	6	New
Independents for Papanui ward	Des King & Gordon Freeman	4.51	2	New
Independent	n/a (Note: Two independents won seats, but the Labour Party's Alex Clark resigned from the party within a week of the election and became the third independent.)		3	+3
This lists parties that won seats. See the complete results below.

Results by ward

The 1989 Christchurch City Council election was a local election held from September to 14 October in Christchurch, New Zealand, as part of that year's nation-wide local elections. Voters elected the mayor of Christchurch and 24 city councillors for the 1989–1992 term of the Christchurch City Council. Postal voting and the first-past-the-post voting system were used. These were the first elections held after the Fourth Labour Government's 1989 local government reforms.

Vicki Buck, an independent, was elected with more than double second place. The council was split mainly into three camps; conservative United Citizens on 7, Labour also on 7, and the new conservative Christchurch Action group on 6.

== Election schedule ==
Key dates relating to the local elections were as follows:

2 September	Final possible day for returning officers to give public notice of location and closing date for candidate nominations.
8 September	Last day of candidate nominations and withdrawals, closed at noon. Unopposed candidates are declared nominated to office.
28 September – 6 October	Postal ballots to be sent out where required.
14 October	Polling day – Polls open 9am to 7pm. Postal ballots must be returned to returning officer before poll close.
1 November	New councils come into existence, elected members take office.

== Mayoral election ==
Incumbent mayor Hamish Hay had been mayor for five terms, and his intention was to contest another mayoralty. Less than two months out from the election, he pulled out of the contest due to ill health. Prior to the election there was a schism on the right wing Citizens' Association resulting in two conservative tickets running against each other. The first to leave the union was councillor Carol Evans. United Citizens was the successor of the Citizens' Association and Christchurch Action was founded by Margaret Murray. Christchurch Action was set up, comprising former councillors from districts that merged with the city as part of the 1989 local government reforms. The three main contenders were Vicki Buck (Independent), Morgan Fahey (United Citizens), and Murray (Christchurch Action). Buck won the election with 52% of the vote.

== Ward results ==
As part of the 1989 local government reforms the number of local government wards increased from five to twelve with each ward electing two members, as opposed to the three or four that wards previously elected. The number of councillors increased from 18 to 24.

The Christchurch Action team was founded on 13 August by Margaret Murray. The ticket's goals were based on improving city services, additional police, and improving efficiency of the council.

There were changes in political affiliations during the council term. Carole Evans, councillor for the West Ward who ran under the Citizens' team in 1986 ran as an independent. Two sitting councillors from the abolished Waimairi district council, Gordon Freeman and Des King, stood under the Independents for Papanui ward team. Philip Carter, who was the son of councillor and deputy mayor Maurice Carter ran for the Action team as opposed to his father's affiliation of Citizens.

Councillor Alex Clark seemingly endorsed Buck for mayor at the Labour council campaign launch on 16 August as well as endorsing the Independents for Papanui Ward ticket. However, chairman of the local body committee of Canterbury Labour, Maggie Hillock, clarified that Clark's endorsement did not represent the views of the party. The accidental endorsement was seen to offend Councillor David Close who had considered standing for Labour on the mayoral ticket.

=== Burwood ward ===
Burwood ward (2)
Party	Candidate	Votes	%	±%
Independent	Carole Evans*	4,461	46.87	
Independent	Mike Stevens	3,183	33.44	
Labour	Arthur Adcock	3,181	33.42	
Labour	Alister James*	2,540	26.69	
United Citizens	Judith Bruce	1,767	18.56	
United Citizens	Colin Harry Russel	1,442	15.15	
Action	Roger Maaka	1,363	14.31	
Action	Butler Graham	1,099	11.55	
Informal votes		432		
Turnout		19,468		

=== Fendalton ward ===
Fendalton ward (2)
Party	Candidate	Votes	%	±%
United Citizens	Ron Wright*	4,559	42.02	
Action	Philip Carter*	4,531	41.76	
Action	Barbara Stewart	4,231	39.00	
United Citizens	Bea Stokes	4,127	38.04	
Independent	Alan Falloon	2,891	26.65	
Independent	Daniel Visser	1,359	12.53	
Informal votes		724		
Turnout		21,698		

=== Ferrymead ward ===
Ferrymead ward (2)
Party	Candidate	Votes	%	±%
United Citizens	David Cox*	4,486	45.53	
Labour	Charles Manning*	3,644	36.99	
United Citizens	Clive Cotton*	2,859	35.40	
Labour	Carl Horn	2,871	29.14	
Action	Jamie Tulloch	1,869	18.97	
Independent	Sara (Sadie) Scott	1,773	18.00	
Action	Roy Hughes	1,573	15.97	
Informal votes		370		
Turnout		19,704		

=== Hagley ward ===
Hagley ward (2)
Party	Candidate	Votes	%	±%
Labour	Linda Constable*	4,046	59.57	
Labour	Denis O'Rourke	3,126	46.02	
United Citizens	Noel Wesney	1,926	28.35	
United Citizens	Rae Mills	1,757	25.87	
Action	Don Donnithorne	1,405	20.68	
Action	Phillip Donnelly	1,325	19.51	
Informal votes		461		
Turnout		13,585		

=== Heathcote ward ===
Heathcote ward (2)
Party	Candidate	Votes	%	±%
United Citizens	Rex Arbuckle*	3,803	37.86	
Action	Oscar Alpers	3,450	34.34	
Independent	Ann Lewis	2,877	28.64	
United Citizens	Gil Laurenson	2,372	23.61	
Action	Raywyn Ramage	2,099	20.89	
Labour	Richard Budd	1,885	18.76	
Labour	Peter McGrail	1,805	17.97	
Independent	David Drayton	1,801	17.93	
Informal votes		489		
Turnout		20,092		

=== Papanui ward ===
Papanui ward (2)
Party	Candidate	Votes	%	±%
Papanui Independent	Gordon Freeman	5,253	50.65	
Papanui Independent	Des King	4,889	47.14	
Action	Bruce McFadden	4,113	39.65	
Action	Gil Simpson	2,783	26.83	
United Citizens	Gail McIntosh	1,933	18.64	
United Citizens	Kate Fraser	1,773	17.09	
Informal votes		500		
Turnout		20,744		

=== Pegasus ward ===
Pegasus ward (2)
Party	Candidate	Votes	%	±%
Labour	David Close*	5,103	57.14	
Labour	Noala Massey*	4,301	48.16	
United Citizens	Bob Andrews	2,884	32.29	
United Citizens	Bill Morgan	2,051	22.97	
Action	Denise Ward	1,840	20.60	
Action	Christian Birch	1,301	14.57	
Progression with Pride	David Nation	381	4.27	
Informal votes		485		
Turnout		17,861		

=== Riccarton ward ===
Riccarton ward (2)
Party	Candidate	Votes	%	±%
Action	David Buist	3,654	38.06	
Action	Derek Anderson	3,598	37.48	
United Citizens	Brian Harman	3,342	34.81	
Independent	Jim Adlam	3,173	33.05	
Independent	Peter Yarrel	3,037	31.63	
United Citizens	Mervyn Cooper	2,397	24.97	
Informal votes		711		
Turnout		19,201		

=== Shirley ward ===
Shirley ward (2)
Party	Candidate	Votes	%	±%
United Citizens	Newton Dodge	3,992	45.07	
United Citizens	Dennis Rich*	3,556	40.15	
Labour	Linda Purves	2,836	32.02	
Labour	Hinemoa Conner	2,151	24.29	
Independent	Phillip Norman	2,007	22.66	
Action	Sarah Armstrong	1,670	18.86	
Action	Ian Shrimpton	1,502	16.96	
Informal votes		444		
Turnout		17,714		

=== Spreydon ward ===
Spreydon ward (2)
Party	Candidate	Votes	%	±%
United Citizens	Morgan Fahey*	4,319	49.79	
Independent	Alex Clark* (Note: Clark was elected on a Labour Party ticket, but resigned from the party within a week of the election and became an independent.)	3,671	42.32	
Labour	Ruby Fowler*	3,186	36.73	
United Citizens	Pearl Quigley	2,686	30.97	
Action	Kevin Trerise	1175	13.55	
Action	Graham Catley	1,077	12.42	
Progressive Independent	Peter Yearbury	1,065	12.28	
Economic Euthenics	Tubby Hansen	169	1.95	
Informal votes		362		
Turnout		17,348		

=== Waimairi ward ===
Waimairi ward (2)
Party	Candidate	Votes	%	±%
Action	Pat Harrow	5,019	47.01	
Action	John Hanafin	4,877	45.68	
Independent	Fred Blogg	3,509	32.86	
United Citizens	Ralph Skjellerup	2,942	27.55	
United Citizens	Honor M. Bonisch	2,423	22.69	
Town & Country	Angus Mackenzie	1,053	9.86	
Independent	Paul Telfer	1,053	9.86%	
Independent	Te Waikanau Taylor	479	4.49	
Informal votes		633		
Turnout		21,355		

=== Wigram ward ===
Wigram ward (2)
Party	Candidate	Votes	%	±%
United Citizens	Mary Corbett	2,866	35.15	
Labour	Ishwar Ganda	2,489	30.53	
Independent	Barry Anderson	2,413	29.59	
Labour	Rod Falconer	1,741	21.35	
Action	Dennis J. Cunningham	1,625	19.93	
United Citizens	John Butler	1,614	19.80	
Action	John Dunnett	1,581	19.39	
Independent	Norman Davey	1,054	12.93	
Independent	Leslie Fibbens	924	11.33	
Informal votes		448		
Turnout		16,307		

=== Ward summary ===
Christchurch city councillors elected
Ward	Party	Elected
Burwood	Independent	Carole Evans*
Burwood	Independent	Mike Stevens
Fendalton	United Citizens	Ron Wright*
Fendalton	Action	Philip Carter
Ferrymead	United Citizens	David Cox*
Ferrymead	Labour	Charles Manning*
Hagley	Labour	Linda Constable*
Hagley	Labour	Denis O'Rourke*
Heathcote	United Citizens	Rex Arbuckle*
Heathcote	Action	Oscar Alpers
Papanui	Papanui Independent	Gordon Freeman
Papanui	Papanui Independent	Des King
Pegasus	Labour	David Close*
Pegasus	Labour	Noala Massey*
Riccarton	Action	David Buist
Riccarton	Action	Derek Anderson
Shirley	United Citizens	Newton Dodge
Shirley	United Citizens	Dennis Rich*
Spreydon	United Citizens	Morgan Fahey*
Spreydon	Labour	Alex Clark* (Note: Clark was elected on a Labour Party ticket, but resigned from the party within a week of the election and became an independent.)
Waimairi	Action	Pat Harrow
Waimairi	Action	John Hanafin
Wigram	United Citizens	Mary Corbett
Wigram	Labour	Ishwar Ganda

Footnotes: * denotes incumbents

== Aftermath ==
Within a week of the election, Clark resigned from the Labour Party without publicly stating the reasons. David Close took over as leader of the party on the city council. The Labour Party and United Citizens' formed an alliance for determining the various committees and their chairpersonship, blocking Christchurch Action and Clark from any influential positions.
