= Ruth Dyson =

New Zealand Labour Party politician

The Honourable Ruth Dyson QSO
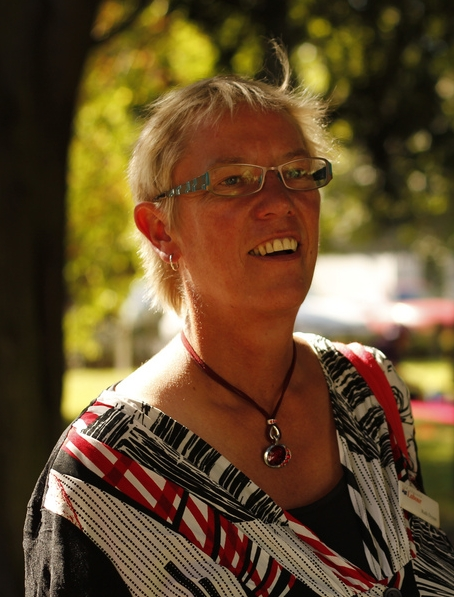
- Ruth Dyson in 2011

Assistant Speaker of the House of Representatives
- In office 3 July 2019 – 17 October 2020
- Preceded by: Poto Williams
- Succeeded by: Jenny Salesa

Chief Government Whip in the House of Representatives
- In office 26 October 2017 – 27 June 2019
- Prime Minister: Jacinda Ardern
- Preceded by: Jami-Lee Ross
- Succeeded by: Michael Wood

24th Minister for Social Development
- In office 31 October 2007 – 19 November 2008
- Prime Minister: Helen Clark
- Preceded by: Steve Maharey
- Succeeded by: Paula Bennett

8th Minister for Senior Citizens
- In office 28 January 2003 – 19 November 2008
- Prime Minister: Helen Clark
- Preceded by: Lianne Dalziel
- Succeeded by: John Carter

7th Minister for ACC
- In office 15 August 2002 – 5 November 2007
- Prime Minister: Helen Clark
- Preceded by: Lianne Dalziel
- Succeeded by: Maryan Street

Member of the New Zealand Parliament for Port Hills Banks Peninsula (1999–2008)
- In office 27 November 1999 – 17 October 2020
- Preceded by: David Carter
- Succeeded by: Tracey McLellan

Member of the New Zealand Parliament for Labour party list
- In office 12 October 1996 – 27 November 1999

Member of the New Zealand Parliament for Lyttelton
- In office 6 November 1993 – 12 October 1996
- Preceded by: Gail McIntosh
- Succeeded by: Constituency abolished

28th President of the Labour Party
- In office 4 September 1988 – 18 April 1993
- Vice President: Fred Anderson (1988–90); Maryan Street (1990–93)
- Preceded by: Rex Jones
- Succeeded by: Maryan Street

Personal details
- Born: Ruth Suzanne Dyson; 11 August 1957 (age 69) Wellington, New Zealand
- Party: Labour Party
- Occupation: Politician

Ruth Suzanne Dyson QSO (born 11 August 1957) is a former New Zealand politician. She was a Labour Party Member of Parliament from 1993 to 2020. She represented the Port Hills electorate from the 2008 election election to 2020. She also held a number of senior offices in the Labour Party, including president.

== Early life and career ==
Dyson was born in Lower Hutt in 1957. Her father served in the New Zealand Army, and so Dyson's family frequently moved around the country. Dyson joined the Labour Party in Westport in 1979, and worked as a campaign organiser for West Coast Labour MP Kerry Burke in the 1981 and 1984 election campaigns. In 1985, she moved to Wellington, where she worked with Labour MP Fran Wilde on the Homosexual Law Reform Bill before taking up a position as an advisor to Burke in the office of the Minister of Employment in 1986. She worked as an organiser for Wilde's re-election campaign in Wellington Central for the 1987 election. Dyson was then employed as an executive officer at Wellington Regional Employment and ACCESS Control.

She held several senior positions in the Labour Party hierarchy. In 1984 she was elected the women's representative on Labour's New Zealand Council before becoming a member of the party executive in 1986. She was the elected vice president of the party at the 1987 Labour conference. At the 1988 conference in Dunedin Dyson won a highly contested campaign to win the party president from former president and maverick MP Jim Anderton by 99 votes (575 to 473). After the defeat of the controversial Fourth Labour Government Dyson was self-employed as a training and employment consultant from 1990 to 1993.

In the lead up to the 1993 election Dyson stood for the Labour nomination in the Christchurch seat of Lyttelton. She beat 5 other local aspirants for the nomination and pledged to move from Wellington into the electorate before the election.

== Member of Parliament ==
New Zealand Parliament
Years	Term	Electorate	List	Party
1993–1996	44th	Lyttelton		Labour
1996–1999	45th	List	19	Labour
1999–2002	46th	Banks Peninsula	15	Labour
2002–2005	47th	Banks Peninsula	22	Labour
2005–2008	48th	Banks Peninsula	14	Labour
2008–2011	49th	Port Hills	14	Labour
2011–2014	50th	Port Hills	5	Labour
2014–2017	51st	Port Hills	none	Labour
2017–2020	52nd	Port Hills	24	Labour

Dyson first entered Parliament in the 1993 election, winning the Lyttelton electorate against National's David Carter. In the 1996 election, the Lyttelton electorate was abolished, and Dyson stood in Banks Peninsula, losing to Carter, who had in the meantime become an MP through winning the 1994 Selwyn by-election. She became a list MP owing to her position on the Labour Party's list. After the 1996 election Dyson was appointed Labour's spokesperson for ACC and Disability Services by leader Helen Clark. In the 1999 election she in turn defeated Carter to win Banks Peninsula. She has remained the MP for the area (later renamed Port Hills) since that time, holding the seat until her retirement in 2020.

Dyson was a senior member of the Labour Party during the Helen Clark-led Fifth Labour Government, serving in a range of health and employment-related portfolios including Minister for Disability Issues (1999–2000; 2001–2008), Minister for ACC (2002–2007), Minister of Labour (2005–2007) and Minister for Social Development and Employment (2007–2008).

=== Fifth Labour Government, 1999–2008 ===
When the Labour Party won power in the 1999 general election, Dyson was appointed to a number of minor ministerial roles, including Disability Issues and Associate Health and Associate Social Development. However, she resigned them on 31 October 2000 after being caught drink driving. She regained most of her ministerial responsibilities on 4 June 2001. She acknowledged after her resignation that she had been convicted and fined for possession of cannabis when she was a teenager stating "I find it sickening that some 25 years later someone has anonymously passed this information to journalists."

As Minister for Disability Issues, she led the development of what would become the New Zealand Sign Language Act 2006, which gave New Zealand Sign Language the status of an official language of New Zealand. In her valedictory statement in 2020, Dyson reflected on the Act: "I regret that it wasn't more prescriptive in its implementation, because its roll-out has been slower than it could have been. That should be fixed."

In a reshuffle on 31 October 2007, Dyson was promoted to Minister for Social Development, which she held until the Clark government lost power at the 2008 general election. Despite the swing against Labour at that election, Dyson won the new Port Hills electorate with an increased margin.

=== Opposition, 2008–2017 ===
The National Party won the 2008 election, putting Labour in Opposition where it would remain for the next nine years. During this time Dyson held a range of portfolios, including health (2008–2011), internal affairs (2011–2013), conservation and disability issues (2013–2015), Canterbury Earthquake Recovery (2013–2014) and senior citizens (2013–2017). She was also deputy chair of the Health select committee (2008–2011) and chair of the Government Administration select committee (2011–2017).

In December 2009 Dyson's Resource Management (Requiring Authorities) Amendment Bill, which would amend the Resource Management Act 1991 to reintroduce a public interest test for projects seeking requiring authority, was drawn from the member's ballot. The bill was defeated at its first reading.

Dyson was criticised in December 2015 for describing National's Speaker David Carter as "incompetent, biased... lazy [and] sexist" on Twitter.

=== Sixth Labour Government 2017–2020 and retirement ===
Dyson had been positioned to be Deputy Speaker of the House of Representatives (to Trevor Mallard) if Labour won the 2017 general election. While Labour was able to form a Government (in coalition with New Zealand First), the National Party's Anne Tolley was appointed as Deputy Speaker instead. Dyson was put in the role of Labour's Senior Whip. However, when the Assistant Speaker Poto Williams was appointed as a Minister outside Cabinet in July 2019, Dyson was named as her replacement.

Dyson was also chair of the Abortion Legislation Committee (a special select committee that examined the Abortion Legislation Bill) and a member of the Epidemic Response Committee (which considered the government's response to the COVID-19 pandemic).

In March 2019, Dyson indicated that she would not seek re-election at the 2020 general election. While the Port Hills electorate was disestablished for that election, Labour's candidate for the replacement electorate of Banks Peninsula was Tracey McLellan.

In the 2021 Queen's Birthday Honours, Dyson was appointed a Companion of the Queen's Service Order, for services as a member of Parliament and to people with disabilities.

In March 2023, Dyson was accused of not being politically impartial in her roles as deputy chair of the Earthquake Commission and Fire and Emergency New Zealand as is the expectation of public servants and government-appointed board members. She admitted to not having read the code of conduct governing her position as a Crown entity board member. She said "I'm prepared to review all my social media engagement and reflect on whether it meets the standard. I haven't done that yet," She had written on Twitter "Oh no. It sounds like some cruel junior staffer gave Mr Luxon the wrong speech! #Waitangi2023," Prime Minister Chris Hipkins said "I would certainly expect her to be reading it [Code of Conduct] ... my understanding is she has subsequently been in touch with the relevant minister's office to indicate she will read the code of conduct and she will follow it".

New Zealand Parliament
Preceded by Gail McIntosh	Member of Parliament for Lyttelton; 1993–1996	Constituencies abolished
Preceded by David Carter	Member of Parliament for Banks Peninsula; 1999–2008	Constituencies abolished
New constituency	Member of Parliament for Port Hills; 2008–2020	Constituencies abolished
Political offices
Preceded by Lianne Dalziel	Minister for Senior Citizens; 2003–2008	Succeeded by John Carter
Preceded by Lianne Dalziel	Minister for ACC; 2002–2007	Succeeded by Maryan Street
Party political offices
Preceded by Rex Jones	President of the Labour Party; 1988–1993	Succeeded by Maryan Street
Preceded by Kris Faafoi	Senior Whip of the Labour Party; 2017–2019	Succeeded by Michael Wood
