= Philip Carter (developer) =

New Zealand property developer and local politician

Member of the Christchurch City Council for the Fendalton ward
- In office 1989–1995

Personal details
- Born: Philip Maurice Carter; 1954 or 1955
- Relatives: Maurice Carter (father); David Carter (brother); Matt Doocey (nephew)
- Occupation: Property developer
- Known for: Property development

Philip Maurice Carter (born 1954 or 1955) is a property developer and former local politician from Christchurch, New Zealand. He is the owner of the Carter Group, a property development company. Intensely private, he is an influential property developer in Christchurch and surrounding districts. Like his father Maurice before him and followed by his son Tim, he spent time as an elected member of Christchurch City Council. His personal wealth is estimated as NZ$350 million in 2025.

== Early life ==
Carter was born in 1954 or 1955. Merle and Maurice Carter were his parents. Philip Carter has four siblings, including the older brother David (born 1952), a former speaker of the House of Representatives. He is an uncle of Matt Doocey.

Carter attended St Bede's College from 1967 to 1971. He received a civil engineering degree with first class honours from the University of Canterbury.

== Political career ==
Carter was first elected to public office in October 1980 at the age of 25. He was successful in the 1980 local election and was elected in the Fendalton riding of Waimairi County Council. By the 1983 local election, the county had been upgraded to a district council, and Carter was re-elected in the Fendalton riding. Carter did not seek re-election in the 1986 local election.

Following the 1989 local government reforms, Waimairi District was amalgamated with Christchurch City. Maurice Carter retired in 1989 after having been a Christchurch city councillor since 1956. Philip Carter stood as a candidate in the Fendalton ward. Prior to the 1989 Christchurch City Council election, there was a schism on the right wing Citizens' Association resulting in two conservative tickets running against each other. The breakaway group, Christchurch Action, was founded by Margaret Murray, alongside whom Carter had served on Waimairi District Council; Carter joined this ticket. Carter was successful in the election. He was a city councillor for two terms until 1995.

Carter took a part in establishing Christchurch City Holdings in 1993, the commercial entity that manages council-owned companies. He was the group's founding chairperson.

== Business career ==
Carter took over the Carter Group in the 1980s from his father, who had founded the company in 1946. The Carter Group is a significant landowner and developer in Christchurch City and Selwyn District. Traditionally, the company focussed on residential and hotel developments. This later diversified. More recent large projects include the IPort business park (NZ$500 million) in the Rolleston industrial subdivision Izone and the retail precinct The Crossing (NZ$140 million) in the Christchurch Central City. The Christchurch Bus Exchange, opened in 2000, was a joint venture between the Carter Group and Christchurch City Council. The Carter Group has a subdivision with 2,100 sections underway in Lincoln. An 850-section subdivision in Ohoka was rejected by Waimakariri District Council, and the Carter Group appealed to the Environment Court in September 2025.

In 2024, Carter was the recipient of the Property Council's long service award. In the same year, Carter was anointed as the most powerful person in The Press Power List, the first time that the list was headed by a private individual. The editor of The Press, Kamala Hayman, wrote an article about how Christchurch had morphed from having a "sense of decay" in 2019—as opined by travel writer Brook Sabin—to "the capital of cool" in 2025. Hayman credits the six largest property developers in Christchurch with the turnaround, of which Carter is one.

== Personal life ==
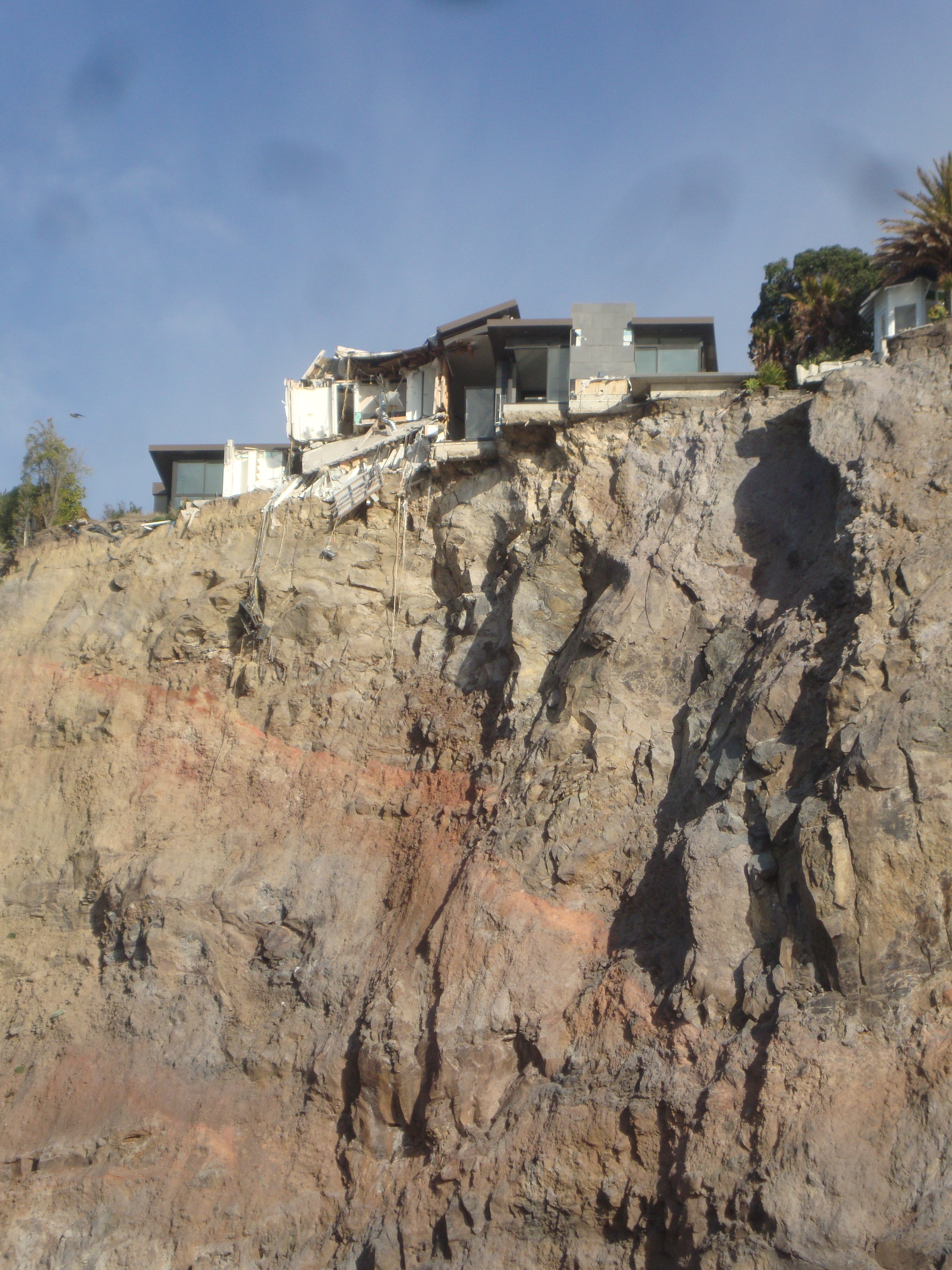
Carter's house after the June 2011 Christchurch earthquake

Carter is described as elusive and secretive. He is a private person and concerned with his public profile. He employed a public relations company to deal with media enquiries on his behalf. Garry Moore, who served alongside Carter on Christchurch City Council from 1989 for six years, describes Carter as an astute politician, "hugely skilled", and "one of the brains behind forming Christchurch City Holdings".

Carter's son Tim was a city councillor for one term (2010–2013); otherwise, he works for the Carter Group. Another son is a civil engineer; he also works for the Carter Group. A daughter is a lawyer.

The National Business Review estimated Carter's wealth at NZ$95 million in 2012, NZ$120 million in 2014, NZ$340 million in 2024, at NZ$350 million in 2025.

Carter lived for three years in a house overlooking Peacocks Gallop, a coastal reserve, in Sumner. He had to vacate the house after the February 2011 earthquake. In the June 2011 earthquake, the front of the house fell down the cliff. In 2012, Carter bought another house in Sumner, locally known as "The Rocks".
