= Maurice Carter (developer) =

New Zealand property developer, philanthropist and politician

Maurice Carter CBE

Deputy mayor of Christchurch
- In office 1983–1989
- Preceded by: Rex Lester
- Succeeded by: Morgan Fahey

Personal details
- Born: Maurice Rhodes Carter; 1 July 1917 Bradford, Yorkshire, England
- Died: 9 May 2011 (aged 93) Christchurch, New Zealand
- Spouse: Merle Cunningham (m. 1942; died 2008)
- Children: 5
- Relatives: David Carter (son); Philip Carter (son); Matt Doocey (grandson)
- Occupation: Property developer
- Known for: Property development, philanthropy

Maurice Rhodes Carter CBE (1 July 1917 – 9 May 2011) was a New Zealand property developer, philanthropist and local politician.

== Biography ==
Carter was born on 1 July 1917 in Bradford, Yorkshire, England. He spent much of his youth in Kettlewell, and Kettlewell Lane in the Christchurch Central City is named after him. He was apprenticed as a carpenter and in 1936, he went with friends on an overseas experience to Argentina where they worked on a plantation. He emigrated to New Zealand in 1938. Although he enlisted for service in World War II, he did not go overseas as the army got him to work on army facilities in Burnham and Weedons. In 1946, he founded his construction company that he named The Carter Group. The company built many of the houses in the Christchurch suburbs of Bryndwr and Burnside and at the peak, the company built 100 houses per year. Known for their quality, houses are still advertised as "Maurice Carter homes" years after his death.

Carter was a local politician. An elected member of Christchurch City Council for 33 years (1956–1989), he was deputy mayor under Hamish Hay from 1983 to 1989. In addition, he held membership of the Christchurch Drainage Board (27 years, with 9 as chairman), the Regional Planning Authority and then the Canterbury United Council (both predecessors to the Canterbury Regional Council), and was then a member of the Canterbury Regional Council for six years (1989–1995).

Carter and his wife set up the Maurice Carter Charitable Trust in 1969; their shops in Bryndwr were vested into this trust. The trust provides grants to a variety of causes.

== Family and death ==
Carter met his wife-to-be—Merle Cunningham—at Burnham Military Camp, where she gave a concert to the troops. On 28 August 1942, Carter and Cunningham were married at Sumner. They were to have five children.

Carter's son David is a National Party politician who has been a member of Parliament since 1994. He was the Speaker of the House from 2013 to 2017. Carter's son Philip and grandson Tim have taken over the Carter Group from him and both have served on Christchurch City Council. Carter's grandson Matt Doocey has been a member of Parliament, also for the National Party, since 2014.

Merle Carter died in 2008. Maurice Carter died at Princess Margaret Hospital in Christchurch on 9 May 2011. He is buried at Bromley Cemetery.

== Honours and awards ==
In the 1976 Queen's Birthday Honours, Carter was appointed an Officer of the Order of the British Empire, for services to local-body and community affairs. In the 1992 Queen's Birthday Honours, he was promoted to Commander of the Order of the British Empire, again for services to local-body and community affairs.
