= David Carter (politician) =

New Zealand politician (born 1952)

The Right Honourable Sir David Carter KNZM
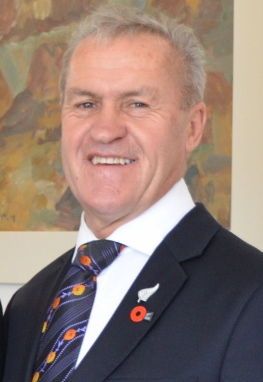

29th Speaker of the New Zealand House of Representatives
- In office 31 January 2013 – 7 November 2017
- Prime Minister: John Key; Bill English; Jacinda Ardern
- Preceded by: Lockwood Smith
- Succeeded by: Trevor Mallard

1st Minister for Primary Industries
- In office 14 December 2011 – 29 January 2013
- Prime Minister: John Key
- Preceded by: Himself (portfolios merged)
- Succeeded by: Nathan Guy

15th Minister of Local Government
- In office 3 August 2012 – 29 January 2013
- Prime Minister: John Key
- Preceded by: Nick Smith
- Succeeded by: Chris Tremain

33rd Minister of Agriculture
- In office 19 November 2008 – 14 December 2011
- Prime Minister: John Key
- Preceded by: Jim Anderton
- Succeeded by: Himself as Minister for Primary Industries

Minister for Biosecurity
- In office 19 November 2008 – 14 December 2011
- Prime Minister: John Key
- Preceded by: Jim Anderton
- Succeeded by: Himself as Minister for Primary Industries

29th Minister for Forestry
- In office 19 November 2008 – 14 December 2011
- Prime Minister: John Key
- Preceded by: Jim Anderton
- Succeeded by: Himself as Minister for Primary Industries

6th Minister for Senior Citizens
- In office 31 August 1998 – 10 December 1999
- Prime Minister: Jenny Shipley
- Preceded by: Robyn McDonald
- Succeeded by: Lianne Dalziel

Member of the New Zealand Parliament for National Party List
- In office 1999–2020

Personal details
- Born: David Cunningham Carter; 3 April 1952 (age 74) Christchurch, New Zealand
- Party: National Party
- Relations: Maurice Carter (father); Philip Carter (brother); Matt Doocey (nephew)
- Education: Lincoln University
- Occupation: Farmer

Sir David Cunningham Carter KNZM (born 3 April 1952) is a New Zealand National Party politician who served as the 29th Speaker of the New Zealand House of Representatives from 2013 to 2017 and as a Cabinet Minister in the Fourth and Fifth National Governments. He represented the Selwyn electorate in the 44th Parliament and the Banks Peninsula electorate in the 45th Parliament. He served as a list MP from 1999 until he retired at the 2020 election.

== Early life ==
Carter was born in Christchurch in 1952, the son of Merle and Maurice Carter. Philip is a younger brother. He attended St Bede's College, and has a Bachelor of Agricultural Science degree from Lincoln University. He has farmed sheep and cattle for over 30 years, and established the first commercial cattle-embryo transplant company in New Zealand in 1974.

== Member of Parliament ==
New Zealand Parliament
Years	Term	Electorate	List	Party
1994–1996	44th	Selwyn		National
1996–1999	45th	Banks Peninsula	41	National
1999–2002	46th	List	21	National
2002–2005	47th	List	4	National
2005–2008	48th	List	8	National
2008–2011	49th	List	9	National
2011–2014	50th	List	10	National
2014–2017	51st	List	3	National
2017–2020	52nd	List	3	National

Carter stood in the Lyttelton electorate in the 1993 election as a successor to Gail McIntosh, but was defeated by Labour's Ruth Dyson. Carter was first elected to Parliament in the 1994 by-election in Selwyn, replacing the resigning Ruth Richardson. In the 1996 general election he won the Banks Peninsula electorate against Dyson. In the 1999 election he was defeated by Dyson, but entered Parliament as a list MP. In the 2002 election, he failed to recapture the seat and remained a list MP.

From 1998 until the National Party's defeat in 1999 Carter was Minister for Senior Citizens, Associate Minister of Revenue, and Associate Minister for Food, Fibre, Biosecurity and Border Control. At the very end of National's term in office, he was also Associate Minister of Education.

In 2008, Carter was initially chosen as the National candidate for the resurrected safe National seat of Selwyn, but opposition to this saw the National candidacy up for grabs again. He pulled out and the candidacy was eventually won by Amy Adams, who won the seat. Carter was given a high list placing of nine instead and did not contest an electorate. After National's election victory, he took the portfolios of Agriculture, Biosecurity and Forestry.

=== Minister of Agriculture ===
In May 2010, Carter issued a ban on kosher slaughter, rejecting the recommendations of his advisers. Carter held shares in a firm that exports meat, and prior to instituting the ban he met senior managers of the firm who wanted a ban on kosher slaughter to reduce their competition.

=== Minister of Primary Industries ===
After the 2011 election, Carter was appointed Minister of the new Ministry of Primary Industries. In November 2012 he approved the increased squid fishery SQU6T by 140%, despite recommendations from scientists and the Department of Conservation that this would be detrimental to the endangered New Zealand sealion.

=== Speaker of the House ===
On 22 January 2013, the Prime Minister John Key announced that Carter was his preference to replace Lockwood Smith as Speaker of the House. Carter's appointment was not without controversy, and the Labour Party questioned whether he actually wanted the job.

As the opposition was not consulted as per convention, Trevor Mallard was nominated by Labour and the position was put to a vote on 31 January 2013. Carter won by 62 votes to 52. Consistent with the tradition of newly elected speakers, Carter had to be "dragged to the chair" following the election.

The office of speaker entitles Carter to the title The Right Honourable following a reform of the New Zealand royal honours system in 2010.

Carter cited his intention to continue as Speaker, "if that is the will of Parliament", as the basis for his decision to stand as a list-only candidate in the 2014 general election.

On 10 November 2015, Carter controversially failed to acknowledge offence caused to significant numbers of Labour and Green MPs after John Key had accused them of "backing rapists" during a debate about the Christmas Island Detention Centre. The following day, Carter silenced seven female MPs who stated that they were victims of sexual abuse and stood up to express personal offence to Key's statement, which they called on Key to apologise for. Carter ruled that the manner in which they stood to address the house was contrary to the House's standing orders and dismissed several of the seven; the remainder walked out.

On 11 May 2016, Carter dismissed the Prime Minister, John Key, from the debating chamber. Key had ignored several of the Speaker's warnings about behaviour contrary to the standing orders. Carter stated, "He is to be treated no differently to any other in this house".

=== In opposition, 2017–2020 ===
Carter was returned as an MP through the National Party list in the 2017 election. Following the election, a Labour-led coalition government was formed with the support of the New Zealand First and Green parties. Carter was succeeded as Speaker by Labour MP Trevor Mallard, who assumed the position on 7 November 2017.

In mid-October 2018, Carter confirmed that he along with fellow National MP Chris Finlayson would retire before the next general election. Carter denied that his resignation came as a result of a secret tape by National Party leader Simon Bridges suggesting that Finlayson should resign in order to clear the way for newer National MPs.

In late July 2020, Carter submitted a private member's bill seeking to repeal the Labour-led government's Electoral (Integrity) Amendment Act 2018. The bill passed its first reading and was referred to the justice select committee. Following the bill's first reading, Carter indicated that he would retire at the 2020 New Zealand general election. Carter's private member bill was assigned to fellow National MP Nick Smith.

== Post-parliament ==
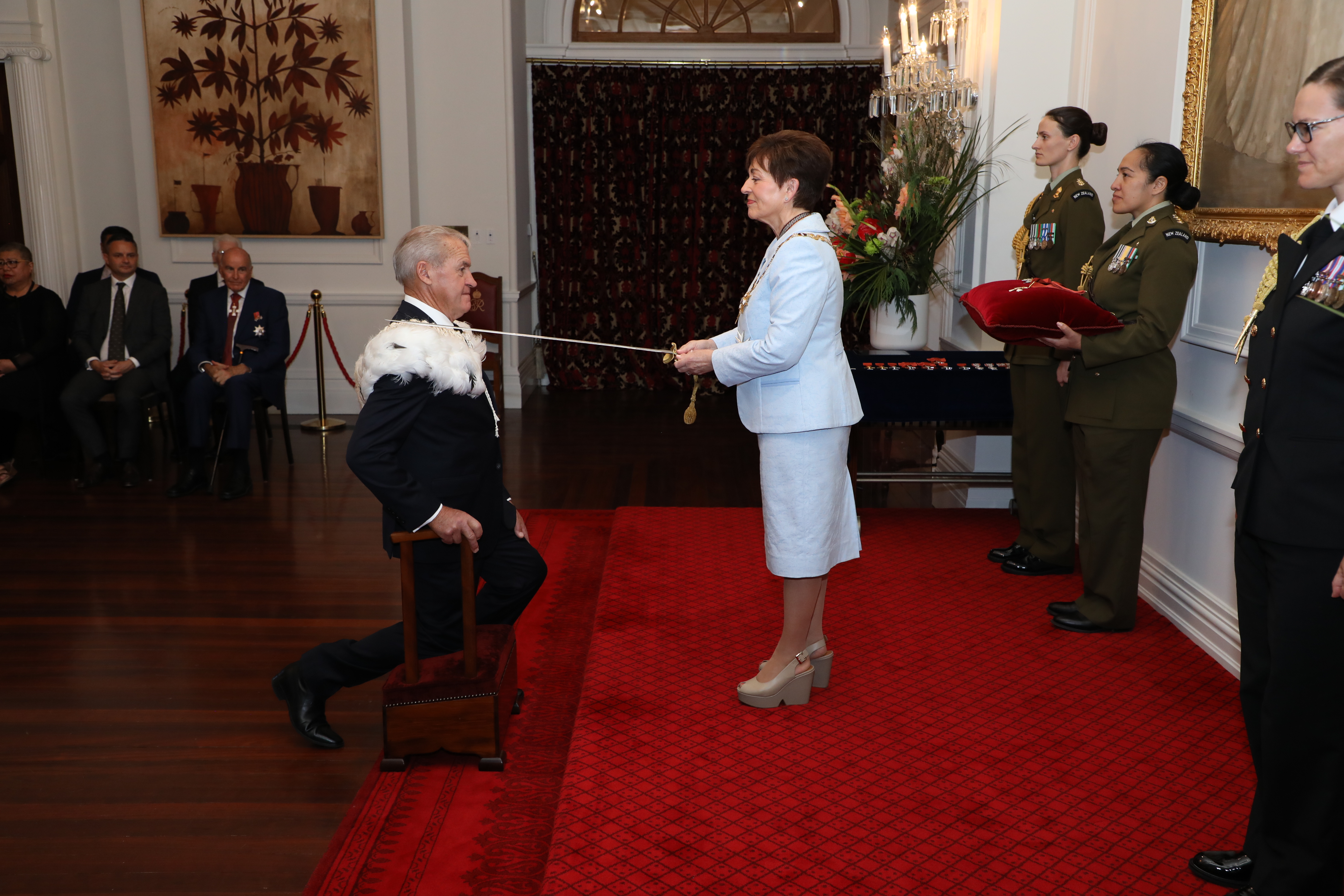
Carter's investiture as a Knight Companion of the New Zealand Order of Merit by the governor-general, Dame Patsy Reddy, at Government House, Wellington, on 5 May 2021

In the 2021 New Year Honours, Carter was appointed a Knight Companion of the New Zealand Order of Merit, for services as a Member of Parliament and Speaker of the House of Representatives.

Following his retirement from parliament, Carter was elected to the National Party's Board of Directors on 21 November 2020. He challenged Peter Goodfellow for the role of President but was unsuccessful. On 8 August 2021 he resigned from the board after another unsuccessful challenge to Goodfellow. He stated that he has "zero confidence" in Goodfellow, criticising the alleged "dysfunctional governance" of the party and lack of money to run a suitable campaign.

In August 2024, Carter became chair of the Canterbury A&P Association board.

New Zealand Parliament
Preceded by Ruth Richardson	Member of Parliament for Selwyn; 1994–1996	In abeyance Title next held by Amy Adams
New constituency	Member of Parliament for Banks Peninsula; 1996–1999	Succeeded by Ruth Dyson
Political offices
Preceded by Lockwood Smith	Speaker of the New Zealand House of Representatives; 2013–2017	Succeeded by Trevor Mallard
Preceded by Robyn McDonald	Minister for Senior Citizens; 1998–1999	Succeeded by Lianne Dalziel
Preceded by Jim Anderton	Minister of Agriculture; 2008–2011	Ministries merged
Preceded by Jim Anderton	Minister for Biosecurity; 2008–2011	Ministries merged
Preceded by Jim Anderton	Minister for Forestry; 2008–2011	Ministries merged
New title New Ministry	Minister for Primary Industries; 2011–2013	Succeeded by Nathan Guy
Preceded by Nick Smith	Minister of Local Government; 2012–2013	Succeeded by Chris Tremain
