= Eileen Savell =

New Zealand farmer and volunteer nurse

Edith Alma Eileen Savell (née Neilson; 1883 – 27 August 1970) was a New Zealand farmer and volunteer nurse. She was born in Lyttelton, New Zealand in 1883. She died on 27 August 1970 in Feilding and was buried at Palmerston North Cemetery.
