= Vanessa Weenink =

New Zealand National Party politician

Vanessa Weenink MP
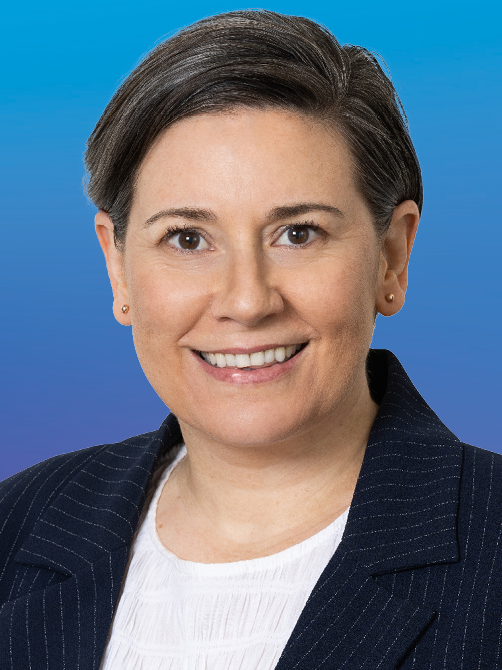
- Weenink in 2023

Member of the New Zealand Parliament for Banks Peninsula
- In office 14 October 2023 – 7 November 2026
- Preceded by: Tracey McLellan
- Succeeded by: Tracey McLellan

Personal details
- Born: 8 November 1978 (age 48)
- Party: National
- Children: 1
- Education: University of Otago

Vanessa Joan Weenink (born 8 November 1978) is a New Zealand politician. She was elected as a Member of the New Zealand House of Representatives for Banks Peninsula, representing the National Party, in the 2023 New Zealand general election. She served one term, having been defeated in the 2026 general election. She is a doctor by training.

== Early life and family ==
Weenink was born on 8 November 1978 at Holmdale, the maternity hospital in Blenheim. Her parents were Ross and Joan Weenink. She grew up in Canvastown.

== Medical and military career ==
Weenink trained as a doctor and worked as a general practitioner for 20 years. She was also an army medical officer. Weenink served nearly 22 years in the New Zealand Army and the New Zealand Territorials. During that time, she was deployed three times with two tours in Afghanistan and one in East Timor in 2006.

Weenink became involved in medical advocacy in 2019, and was the deputy chair of the New Zealand Medical Association (NZMA) and chair of the NZMA's General Practitioners Council. She had previously been a member of the Labour Party and had campaigned alongside Duncan Webb in Christchurch Central in 2017, but resigned in order to be more involved with the NZMA. After the NZMA was disestablished in 2022, she joined the National Party.

== Political career ==
New Zealand Parliament
Years	Term	Electorate	List	Party
2023–2026	54th	Banks Peninsula	40	National

Weenink had previously been a member of the Labour Party and had campaigned alongside Duncan Webb in Christchurch Central in 2017, but resigned in order to be more involved with the NZMA. After the NZMA was disestablished in 2022, she joined the National Party. She sought the National Party nomination for Ilam for the 2023 general election, but was unsuccessful.

She was announced as National's candidate for Banks Peninsula in March 2023 and was also ranked 40th on the National Party. According to final results, Weenink won the electorate with an 396-vote lead over incumbent Tracey McLellan, flipping the seat to National for the first time in over two decades (the electorate was last won by National in the 1996 election).

In Weenink's maiden parliamentary speech, she described herself as socially liberal and fiscally conservative.

In December 2023, it was revealed that Weenink disagreed with her party’s position on smoke-free legislation. Newshub uncovered previous Facebook comments from Weenink in April 2021 on the Facebook page of Labour Party MP Duncan Webb in which she stated her belief that "The nicotine level idea is a good one." in relation to the Labour governments smoke-free plans and legislation. She went on to refuse to provide comment on this stating that she now had a role as a backbench MP and it was not appropriate for her to comment.

During the 2026 New Zealand general election, Weenink contested Banks Peninsula for National. She was ranked 38th on the National Party list. Weenink was not returned to parliament and defeated by 2,261 votes (preliminary count) to Labour MP Tracey McLellan. After losing her seat, Weenink revealed that she had been approached by Opportunity leader Qiulae Wong to stand as a candidate in Banks Peninsula. She also said that she encountered criticism of the party's perceived far right tilt while campaigning.

New Zealand Parliament
Preceded by Tracey McLellan	Member of Parliament for Banks Peninsula; 2023–2026	Succeeded by Tracey McLellan
