= Tracey McLellan =

New Zealand politician

Tracey McLellan MP
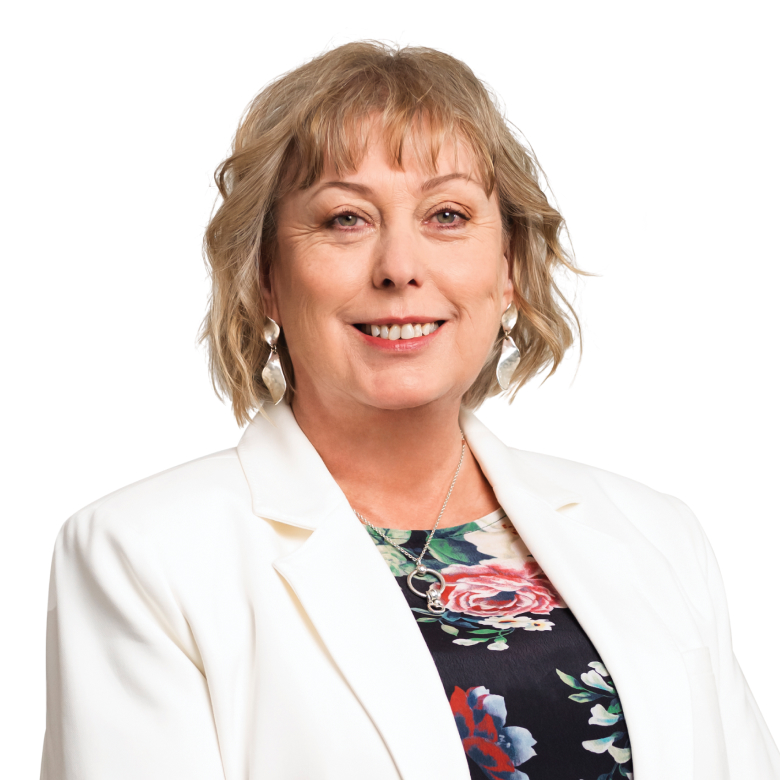
- McLellan in 2023

Member of the New Zealand Parliament for Labour Party list
- Incumbent
- Assumed office 29 January 2024
- Preceded by: Rino Tirikatene

Member of the New Zealand Parliament for Banks Peninsula
- In office 17 October 2020 – 14 October 2023
- Preceded by: Ruth Dyson (as MP for Port Hills)
- Succeeded by: Vanessa Weenink

Vice-president of the New Zealand Labour Party
- In office 20 May 2019 – 7 May 2021
- Preceded by: Beth Houston
- Succeeded by: Carol Beaumont

Personal details
- Born: 20 May 1970 (age 56)
- Party: Labour
- Children: 2
- Education: University of Canterbury

Tracey Lee McLellan (born 20 May 1970) is a New Zealand politician. From 2020 to 2023, she was a Member of Parliament in the House of Representatives for the Labour Party. In 2024, she re-entered parliament after the resignation of fellow Labour List MP Rino Tirikatene.

== Early life ==
McLellan was born in Sydney, Australia in May 1970, before moving to Southland, where she grew up in a state house. Her mother was disabled and unable to work. McLellan moved to Christchurch in 2002. McLellan has a master's degree from Massey University, and a PhD in psychology from the University of Canterbury and worked in academic psychology specialising in sports injuries and concussion, as a research scientist at the University of Canterbury. Later she became a union organiser for the New Zealand Nurses Organisation.

== Political career ==
New Zealand Parliament
Years	Term	Electorate	List	Party
2020–2023	53rd	Banks Peninsula	53	Labour
2024–2026	54th	List	27	Labour
2026–present	55th	Banks Peninsula	28	Labour

=== Labour Party activism ===
McLellan has been a member of the Labour Party since 2011. She was chair of the electorate committee and was joint campaign manager to Ruth Dyson's campaign in the Port Hills electorate at the 2014 election. In May 2019 she won a by-election to become vice president of the Labour Party. Following Nigel Haworth's resignation over his handling of abuse allegations within the party, McLellan (who was a member of a panel which dismissed initial complaints) became acting party president.

She was selected as its candidate for the Banks Peninsula electorate in November 2019, ahead of three other nominees: Reuben Davidson, Joe Davies and Tyrone Fields. In January 2020, McLellan identified ACC and health as portfolios in which she would like to make a difference, but says that her electorate has diverse needs from climate change effects in Sumner and Lyttelton, to education, health, housing and water issues.

=== Member of Parliament ===
During the 2020 general election held on 17 October, McLellan was elected with a majority of 13,156 over National's Catherine Chu and Green Party Member of Parliament Eugenie Sage.

In 2023 general election McLellan led the contest for Banks Peninsula on the election night preliminary count, but lost the seat to National's Vanessa Weenink after special votes were counted. She was ranked 27th on Labour's party list, too low to win a list seat given Labour's collapse in the election, and so left Parliament.

In late January 2024 she returned to parliament as a List MP following the resignation of Rino Tirikatene. Following the resignation of Grant Robertson in mid-February 2024, McLellan assumed the Corrections and Associate Health portfolios in the Shadow Cabinet of Chris Hipkins.

In early March 2025, McLellan gained the Christchurch Issues portfolio. While she retained the corrections portfolio, she lost the associate health portfolio. On 11 March 2025, McLellan was appointed junior whip of the Labour Party.

On 20 August 2025, Parliament passed McLellan's private member's bill extending the range of protections for those giving evidence of sexual assaults or family harm in the Family Court passed into law with unanimous support from all parties.

During the 2026 New Zealand general election, McLellan won the Banks Peninsula electorate back from Weenink. She was ranked 28th on the Labour Party list.

== Family ==
McLellan is a single mother to two sons. One son, Jake, was elected a member of the Christchurch City Council in 2019. She credits her son with pushing her to join the Labour Party.

New Zealand Parliament
Vacant Constituency recreated after abolition in 2008 Title last held by Ruth Dyson	Member of Parliament for Banks Peninsula; 2020–2023	Succeeded by Vanessa Weenink
Party political offices
Preceded by Beth Houston	Vice-President of the New Zealand Labour Party; 2019–2021	Succeeded by Carol Beaumont
