= Banks Peninsula (electorate) =

- Single-member general constituency for the New Zealand House of Representatives
- Interactive map of boundaries from the 2026 election
- Formation: 1996, 2020
- Region: Canterbury
- Character: Rural and suburban
- Term: 3 years

Member for Banks Peninsula
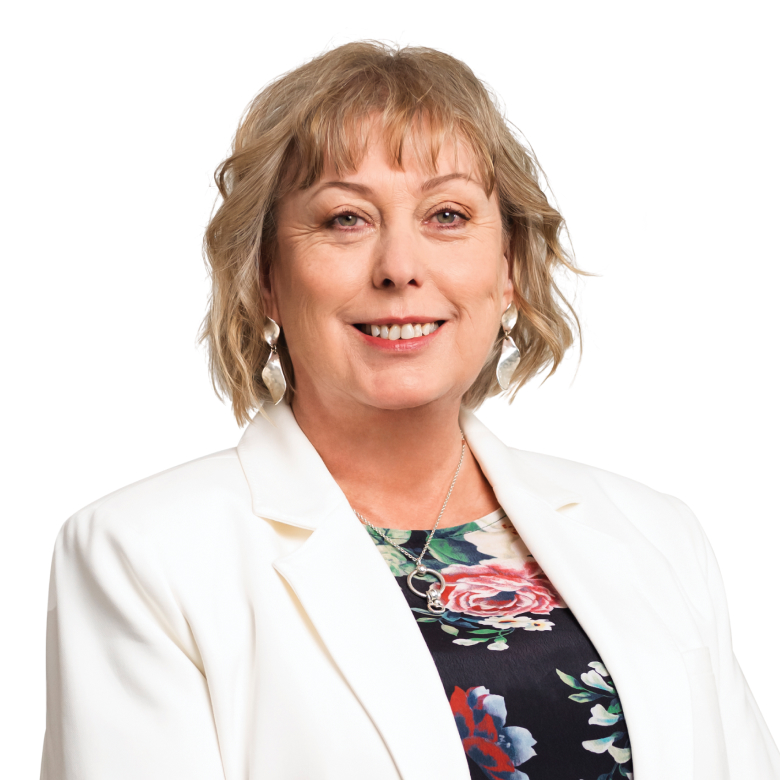
- Tracey McLellan since 7 November 2026
- Party: Labour
- List MPs: Lan Pham (Green); Laura Trask (ACT)
- Previous MP: Tracey McLellan (Labour)
Party vote distribution

Banks Peninsula is a New Zealand parliamentary electorate which initially existed from 1996 to 2008, and was later recreated in 2020 ahead of the 2020 election. It was held by National's David Carter for the initial term, and then by Labour's Ruth Dyson from 1999 to 2008. As of 2023, the seat is currently held by National's Vanessa Weenink.

== Population centres ==
The Banks Peninsula electorate, as defined in 2020, includes some of southern Christchurch, including the suburbs of Oaklands, Somerfield, Cashmere, Kennedys Bush, Woolston, Halswell, Heathcote Valley, and Sumner. It also includes some towns immediately south of Christchurch such as Lyttelton, Governors Bay, Rāpaki, Lansdowne and all of Banks Peninsula itself including the towns of Akaroa, Diamond Harbour, Duvauchelle and Little River.

== History ==
The 1996 election was notable for the significant change of electorate boundaries, based on the provisions of the Electoral Act 1993. Because of the introduction of the mixed-member proportional (MMP) electoral system, the number of electorates had to be reduced, leading to significant changes. More than half of the electorates contested in 1996 were newly constituted, and most of the remainder had seen significant boundary changes. In total, 73 electorates were abolished, 29 electorates were newly created (including Banks Peninsula), and 10 electorates were recreated, giving a net loss of 34 electorates. Banks Peninsula replaced the previous Lyttelton electorate.

In boundary changes for the 2008 general election, the electorate lost its rural population centres to the newly formed Selwyn, and became a solely urban electorate that was renamed Port Hills. Labour's Ruth Dyson retained Port Hills for all four elections with a greater lead than she had seen for Banks Peninsula. Dyson chose not to seek reelection in 2020 with Labour's Tracey McLellan succeeding Dyson.

Map of boundaries at the 2020 and 2023 general elections

In the boundary review of 2019/2020, the Representation Commission decided to make large changes to the boundaries of Port Hills, taking area in Halswell and parts of Bromley out and adding Banks Peninsula in, to manage large changes in population in the Christchurch and Selwyn areas. The electorate was also re-recreated as Banks Peninsula. At its first election, the electorate was won easily by Labour's Tracey McLellan amidst the nationwide Labour landslide.

=== Members of Parliament ===
Key

National Labour Alliance Green

Election	Winner
1996 election	David Carter
1999 election	Ruth Dyson
2002 election	Ruth Dyson
2005 election	Ruth Dyson
(Electorate abolished 2008–2020; see Port Hills)
2020 election	Tracey McLellan
2023 election	Vanessa Weenink
2026 election	Tracey McLellan

=== List MPs ===
Election	Winner
1996 election	Rod Donald
1996 election	Ruth Dyson
1999 election	David Carter
1999 election	Rod Donald
2002 election	David Carter
2002 election	Rod Donald
2005 election	David Carter
2005 election	Rod Donald (Note: Rod Donald was elected from the Green Party list, but died before he was sworn into the 48th New Zealand Parliament. Nándor Tánczos was next on the list and so took Donald's place.)
(Electorate abolished 2008–2020; see Port Hills)
2020 election	Eugenie Sage
2023 election	Lan Pham
2023 election	Laura Trask
2024	Tracey McLellan (Note: Re-entered Parliament following the resignation of Labour MP Rino Tirikatene.)

== Election results ==
=== 2023 election ===
2023 general election: Banks Peninsula
Notes:	Blue background denotes the winner of the electorate vote. Pink background denotes a candidate elected from their party list. Yellow background denotes an electorate win by a list member, or other incumbent. A ✓ or ✗ denotes status of any incumbent, win or lose respectively.						
Party	Candidate	Votes	%	±%	Party votes	%	±%
National	Vanessa Weenink	17,860	36.54	+11.91	15,839	31.97	+11.05
Labour	✗ Tracey McLellan	17,464	35.69	−15.42	13,200	26.66	−23.57
Green	Lan Pham	8,325	17.02	+4.05	9,763	19.71	+5.52
ACT	Laura Trask	2,073	4.24	+0.89	3,919	7.92	+0.96
NZ First	Lindsay Kerslake	1,598	3.27	+1.91	2,658	5.37	+3.39
NewZeal	Lisa Mead	544	1.11	+1.11	323	0.65	+0.65
DemocracyNZ	Doug Allington	474	0.96	+0.96	146	0.29	+0.29
Animal Justice	Paran Jeet	369	0.75	+0.75	111	0.22	+0.22
Independent	Peter Wakeman	184	0.38	+0.38			
Opportunities					2,401	4.85	+2.69
NZ Loyal					389	0.79	+0.79
Te Pāti Māori					388	0.78	+0.50
Legalise Cannabis					182	0.37	+0.11
New Conservatives					62	0.13	−1.12
Freedoms NZ					61	0.12	+0.12
Leighton Baker Party					53	0.11	+0.11
Women's Rights					42	0.09	+0.09
New Nation					22	0.04	+0.04
Informal votes		440			194		
Total valid votes		49,331			49,753		
National gain from Labour	Majority	396	0.85	—			

=== 2020 election ===
2020 general election: Banks Peninsula
Notes:	Blue background denotes the winner of the electorate vote. Pink background denotes a candidate elected from their party list. Yellow background denotes an electorate win by a list member, or other incumbent. A ✓ or ✗ denotes status of any incumbent, win or lose respectively.						
Party	Candidate	Votes	%	±%	Party votes	%	±%
Labour	Tracey McLellan	25,393	51.11	—	25,091	50.23	—
National	Catherine Chu	12,237	24.63	—	10,453	20.92	—
Green	Eugenie Sage	6,222	12.52	—	7,089	14.19	—
ACT	David Fox	1,715	3.45	—	3,478	6.96	—
Opportunities	Ben Atkinson	1,518	3.05	—	1,083	2.16	—
NZ First	Denis O'Rourke	679	1.36	—	991	1.98	—
New Conservative	Caleb Honiss	639	1.28	—	626	1.25	—
Advance NZ	Tiamara Williams	506	1.01	—	424	0.84	—
Māori Party					144	0.28	—
Legalise Cannabis					133	0.26	—
ONE					69	0.13	—
Sustainable NZ					41	0.08	—
Outdoors					37	0.07	—
Social Credit					22	0.04	—
Vision NZ					15	0.03	—
TEA					10	0.02	—
Heartland					4	0.01	—
Informal votes		772			241		
Total valid votes		49,681			49,951		
Labour win new seat	Majority	13,156	26.48				

=== 2005 election ===
2005 election: Banks Peninsula
Notes:	Blue background denotes the winner of the electorate vote. Pink background denotes a candidate elected from their party list. Yellow background denotes an electorate win by a list member, or other incumbent. A ✓ or ✗ denotes status of any incumbent, win or lose respectively.						
Party	Candidate	Votes	%	±%	Party votes	%	±%
Labour	✓ Ruth Dyson	17,639	43.83	−1.13	16,355	40.10	−0.13
National	David Carter	15,716	39.05	+5.33	15,697	38.48	+16.89
Green	Rod Donald	4,542	11.29	−0.41	4,255	10.43	+0.20
United Future	Robin Loomes	984	2.45	−1.11	1,434	3.52	−3.91
Progressive	Phil Clearwater	898	2.23	+0.44	808	1.98	−0.62
ACT	Alex Mann	346	0.86	−1.45	443	1.09	−6.42
Alliance	Andrew McKenzie	118	0.29	−0.36	39	0.10	−1.18
NZ First					1,421	3.48	−2.92
Destiny					81	0.20	+0.20
Māori Party					80	0.20	+0.20
Legalise Cannabis					61	0.15	−0.32
Christian Heritage					45	0.11	−0.92
Libertarianz					19	0.05	+0.05
Democrats					17	0.04	+0.04
One NZ					10	0.02	−0.02
99 MP					9	0.02	+0.02
Direct Democracy					5	0.01	+0.01
RONZ					5	0.01	+0.01
Family Rights					4	0.01	+0.01
Informal votes		342			112		
Total valid votes		40,243			40,788		
Turnout		41,006	86.07	+3.71			
Labour hold	Majority	1,923	4.78	−6.32			

=== 2002 election ===
2002 election: Banks Peninsula
Notes:	Blue background denotes the winner of the electorate vote. Pink background denotes a candidate elected from their party list. Yellow background denotes an electorate win by a list member, or other incumbent. A ✓ or ✗ denotes status of any incumbent, win or lose respectively.						
Party	Candidate	Votes	%	±%	Party votes	%	±%
Labour	✓ Ruth Dyson	16,233	44.96	+3.56	14,704	40.23	+2.88
National	David Carter	12,176	33.72	+0.03	7,892	21.59	−12.10
Green	Rod Donald	4,223	11.70	+1.42	3,739	10.23	+2.93
United Future	Stephanie McEwin	1,284	3.56	+2.55^{a}	2,717	7.43	+5.78^{a}
ACT	Paul King	834	2.31	+0.43	2,744	7.51	+0.77
Progressive	Phil Clearwater	646	1.79	+1.79	952	2.60	+2.60
Christian Heritage	Gerald Barker	476	1.32	−0.49	378	1.03	−1.02
Alliance	Francis (Val) McClimont	234	0.65	−3.29	469	1.28	−6.30
NZ First					2,340	6.40	+4.30
ORNZ					424	1.16	+1.16
Legalise Cannabis					172	0.47	−0.29
One NZ					13	0.04	+0.01
Mana Māori					5	0.01	+0.003
NMP					2	0.01	+0.01
Informal votes		326			96		
Total valid votes		36,106			36,551		
Turnout		36,743	82.36				
Labour hold	Majority	4,057	11.10	+7.22			

^{a} United Future swing is compared to the combined 1999 results of United NZ and Future NZ, who merged in 2000.

=== 1999 election ===
1999 election: Banks Peninsula
Notes:	Blue background denotes the winner of the electorate vote. Pink background denotes a candidate elected from their party list. Yellow background denotes an electorate win by a list member, or other incumbent. A ✓ or ✗ denotes status of any incumbent, win or lose respectively.						
Party	Candidate	Votes	%	±%	Party votes	%	±%
Labour	Ruth Dyson	15,475	41.40		14,018	37.35	
National	✗ David Carter	14,020	37.51		12,643	33.69	
Green	Rod Donald	3,842	10.28		2,739	7.30	
Alliance	Maevis Watson	1,474	3.94		2,844	7.58	
ACT	Paul King	704	1.88		2,530	6.74	
Christian Heritage	Rosemary Francis	675	1.81		769	2.05	
NZ First	Charlie Crofts	510	1.36		788	2.10	
Christian Democrats	Simon Melville Hadfield	379	1.01		409	1.09	
Independent	Ann Lewis	202	0.54				
Natural Law	David Lovell-Smith	98	0.26		48	0.13	
Legalise Cannabis					286	0.76	
United NZ					212	0.56	
Libertarianz					95	0.25	
South Island					56	0.15	
Animals First					39	0.10	
McGillicuddy Serious					30	0.08	
One NZ					12	0.03	
Mana Māori					4	0.01	
Freedom Movement					3	0.01	
Republican					3	0.01	
People's Choice					2	0.01	
Mauri Pacific					1	0.00	
NMP					1	0.00	
Informal votes		390			237		
Total valid votes		37,379			37,532		
Labour gain from National	Majority	1,455	3.88				

=== 1996 election ===
1996 general election: Banks Peninsula
Notes:	Blue background denotes the winner of the electorate vote. Pink background denotes a candidate elected from their party list. Yellow background denotes an electorate win by a list member, or other incumbent. A ✓ or ✗ denotes status of any incumbent, win or lose respectively.						
Party	Candidate	Votes	%	±%	Party votes	%	±%
National	David Carter	15,694	41.13		14,284	37.30	
Labour	Ruth Dyson	11,316	29.66		10,597	27.67	
Alliance	Rod Donald	7,235	18.96		5,352	13.97	
NZ First	Ross Gluer	1,782	4.67		2,839	7.41	
Christian Coalition	Neville Chamberlain	808	2.12		1,650	4.31	
ACT	Jeff Lopas	571	1.50		2,378	6.21	
Independent	Ann Lewis	351	0.92				
McGillicuddy Serious	Elizabeth Holland	199	0.52		81	0.21	
Natural Law	David Lovell-Smith	176	0.46		84	0.22	
Dominion Workers	Anton Bailey	25	0.07				
Legalise Cannabis					511	1.33	
United NZ					336	0.88	
Progressive Green					72	0.19	
Animals First					43	0.11	
Green Society					24	0.06	
Mana Māori					15	0.04	
Ethnic Minority Party					12	0.03	
Superannuitants & Youth					10	0.03	
Advance New Zealand					3	0.01	
Libertarianz					3	0.01	
Conservatives					2	0.01	
Asia Pacific United					1	0.00	
Te Tawharau					0	0.00	
Informal votes		228			88		
Total valid votes		38,157			38,297		
National win new seat	Majority	4,378	11.47				
