= Lyttelton, New Zealand =

Settlement in Christchurch, New Zealand

Lyttelton
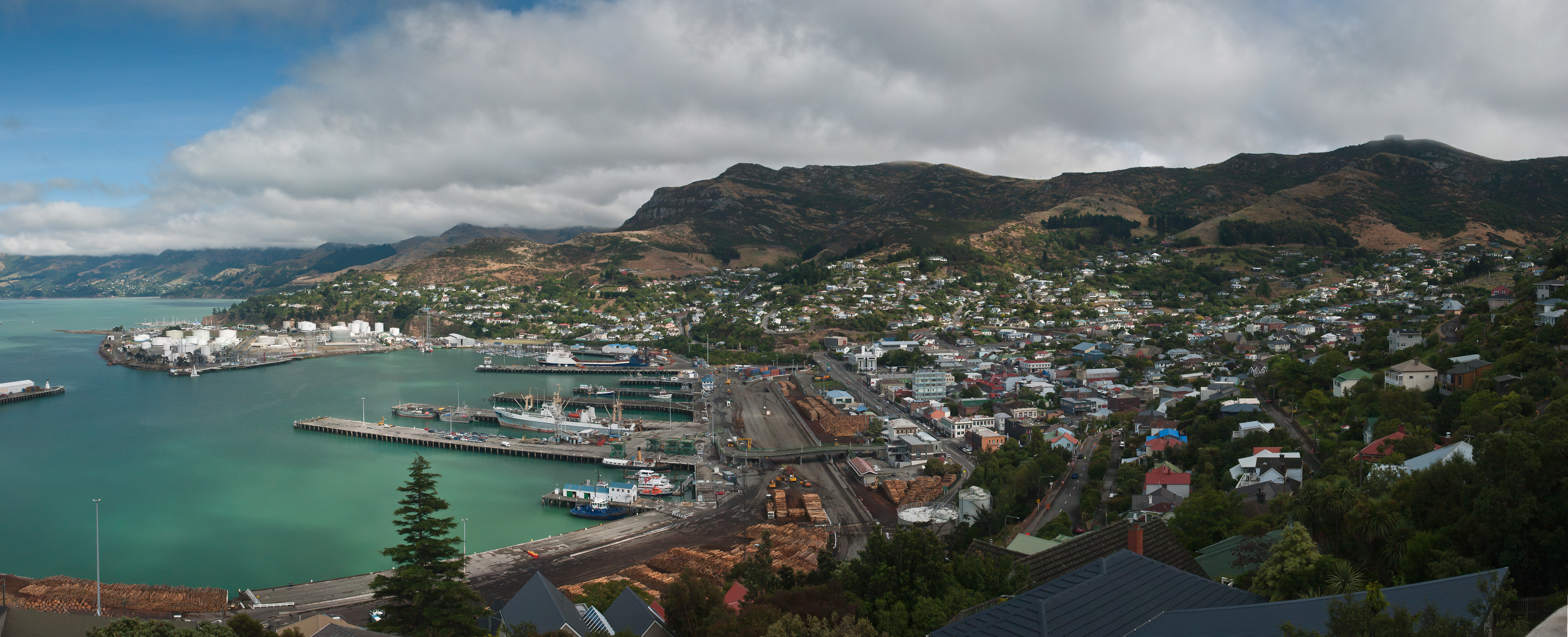
- Lyttelton inner harbour and township in February 2010
- Interactive map of Lyttelton
- Coordinates: 43.60°S 172.72°E
- Country: New Zealand
- Region: Canterbury
- Local authority: Christchurch City Council
- Ward: Banks Peninsula
- Community: Te Pātaka o Rākaihautū Banks Peninsula
- Electorates: Banks Peninsula; Te Tai Tonga (Māori)

Government
  - Territorial Authority: Christchurch City Council
  - Regional council: Environment Canterbury
  - Mayor of Christchurch: Phil Mauger
  - Banks Peninsula MP: Tracey McLellan
  - Te Tai Tonga MP: Mananui Ramsden

Area
  - Total: 4.52 km^{2} (1.75 sq mi)

Population (June 2025)
  - Total: 3,220
  - Density: 712/km^{2} (1,850/sq mi)
- Postcode: 8082

Lyttelton (Māori: Ōhinehou or Riritana) is a port town on the north shore of Lyttelton Harbour / Whakaraupō, on the eastern coast of the South Island of New Zealand. The town is separated from Christchurch by the Port Hills, an eroded remnant of the extinct Banks Peninsula Volcano.

The Port of Lyttelton was historically regarded as the "Gateway to Canterbury" for colonial settlers. It is the South Island's principal goods-transport terminal, handling 34% of exports and 61% of imports by value, and is also a regular destination for cruise ships.

== Toponymy ==
Lyttelton was formerly called both Port Cooper (after Daniel Cooper) and Port Victoria. The name Lyttelton was formalised by the governor in 1858, in honour of George Lyttelton, 4th Baron Lyttelton of the Canterbury Association, an organisation that led early British colonisation of the region.

== History ==
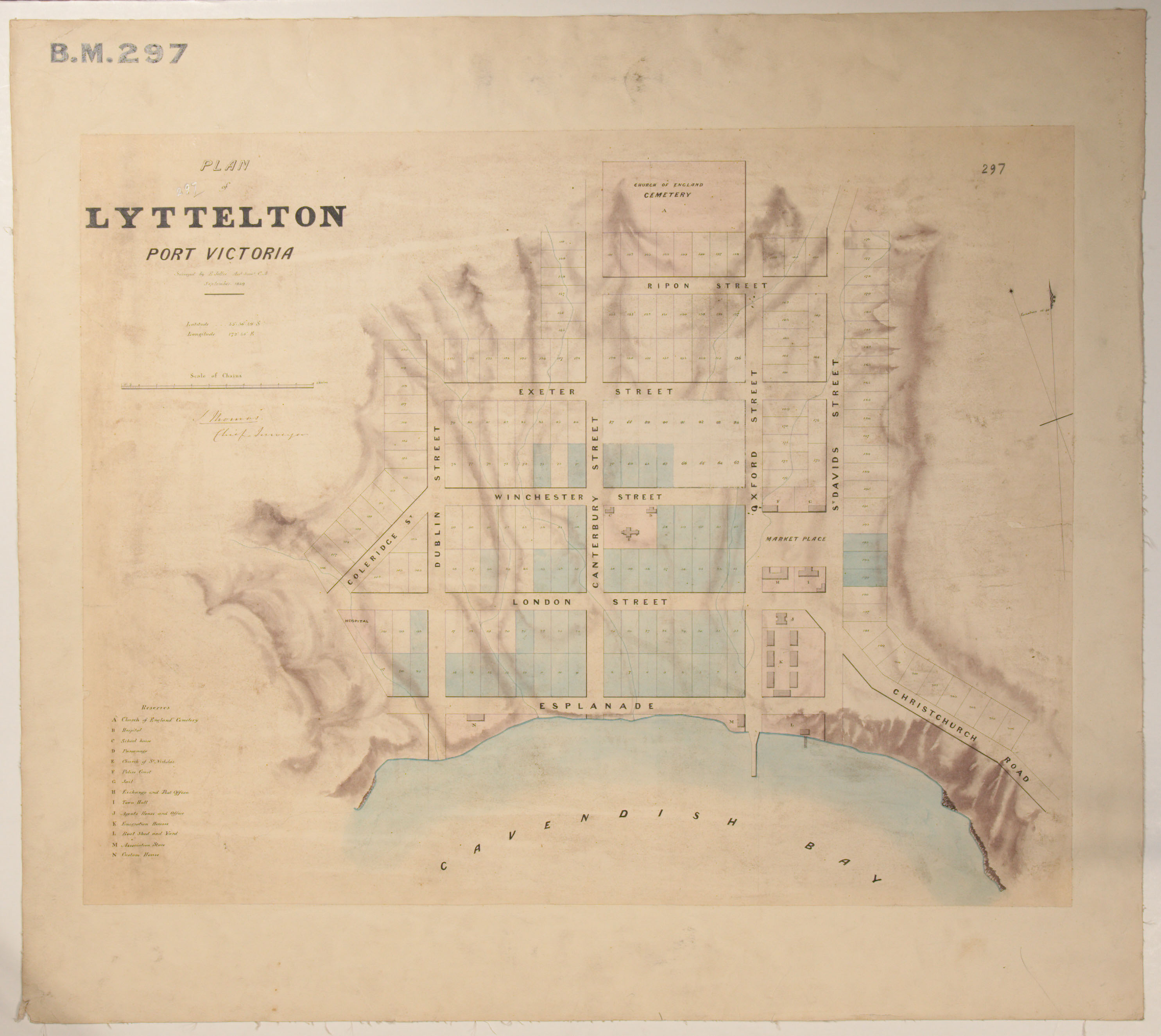
Black Map of Lyttelton from September 1849

James Cook recorded his sighting of Lyttelton Harbour / Whakaraupō in 1770 during his first voyage to New Zealand. The first ship recorded entering the harbour was the sealer Pegasus in 1809.

=== Establishment ===
Aiming to establish a Church of England colony in New Zealand, the Canterbury Association was founded in 1848 and was led by George Lyttelton, 4th Baron Lyttelton.

Joseph Thomas, as the agent of the Canterbury Association and its chief surveyor, was in charge of preparing the settlement for the settlers. He initially placed the port town at Rāpaki and the settlement's capital, Christchurch, at the head of the harbour at present-day Teddington. But none of these initial ideas proved feasible. Rāpaki was not available, as it had been promised to Māori as a reserve, and reclamation required at the head of the harbour for the capital was estimated as too expensive. Thomas decided on the "Port Cooper Plains", the present-day site of Christchurch, for the new settlement.

Early survey work in Lyttelton was done by Thomas and Charles Torlesse, but most of the work until completion in September 1849 was done by Edward Jollie. In his diary, Jollie explained how the streets got their names:

The names of the streets of the three towns I surveyed were taken from Bishoprics and the way it was done was this; as soon as I completed the map I took it to Thomas who putting on his gold spectacles and opening his would read out a Bishop's name to hear if it sounded well. If I agreed with him that it did, I put the name to one of the streets requiring baptism. Lyttelton being the first-born town got the best names for its streets, Sumner being next had the next best and Christchurch being the youngest had to be content with chiefly Irish and Colonial bishoprics as names for its streets. This accounts for, what to anyone not knowing the circumstances, appears strange, viz: that many of the best English Bishoprics are not represented [editorial note: not represented "in Christchurch"] while Irish and Colonial ones are.

In August 1849 Lyttelton was officially proclaimed a port. Pilgrim's Rock shows the place where European settlers first set foot in the harbour. The present location of the rock is well inland from the sea, as much of Lyttelton's dockside has been reclaimed from the harbour waters in recent years.

Before any building had begun in Christchurch, Thomas ordered the construction of a jetty and immigration barracks at Lyttelton, so before any Canterbury Association settlers arrived the town had 60 buildings and a population of around 300. Between 16 and 27 December 1850, four ships (the Randolph, Cressy, Sir George Seymour, and Charlotte Jane) arrived in Lyttelton Harbour, carrying the first of what were to be known as the 'Canterbury pilgrims'. Their arrival swelled Lyttelton's population to around 1,100. Over the next three years, 3,549 settlers arrived in Lyttelton.

=== 19th century ===
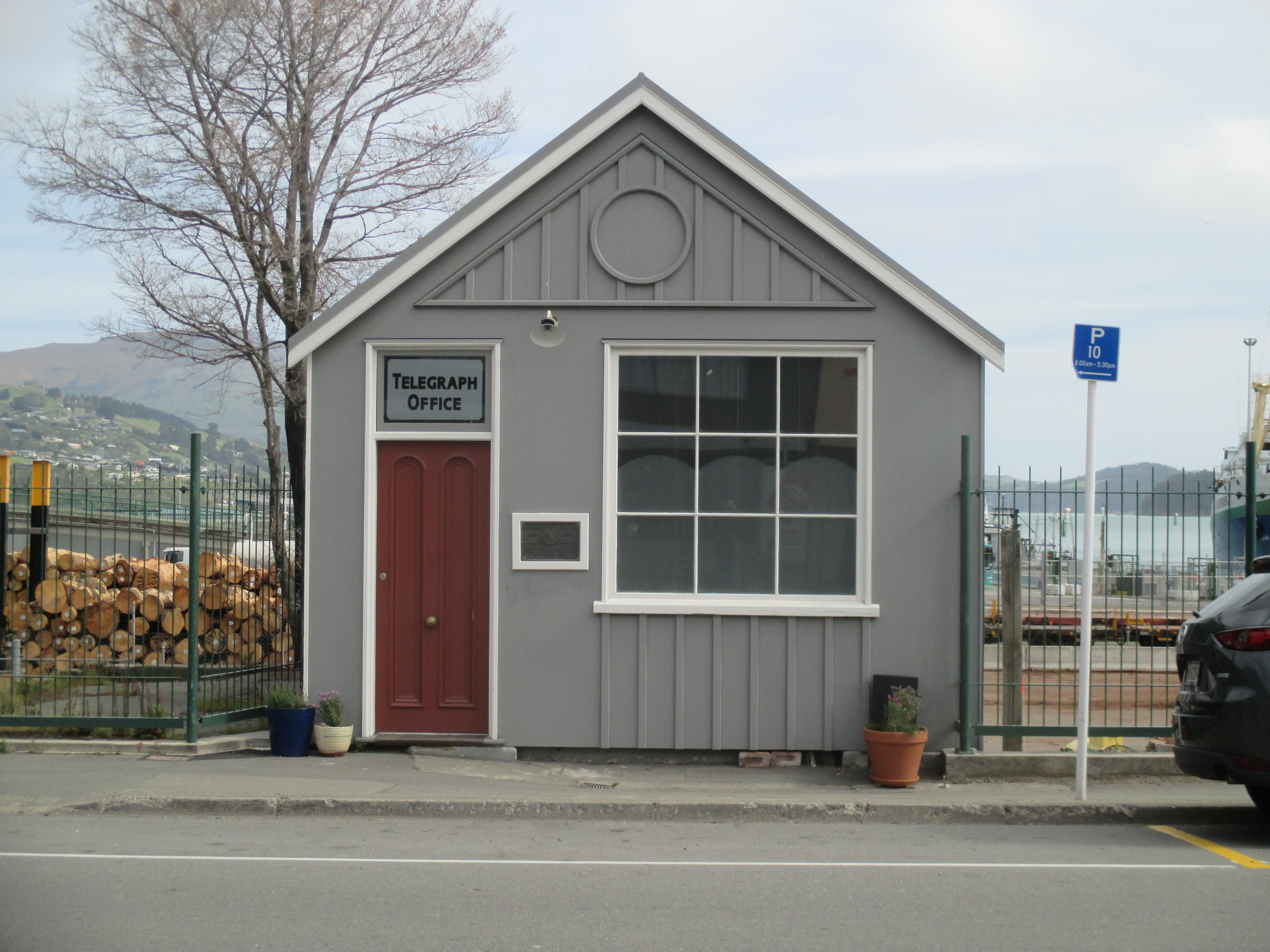
The historic telegraph office near the Port of Lyttelton

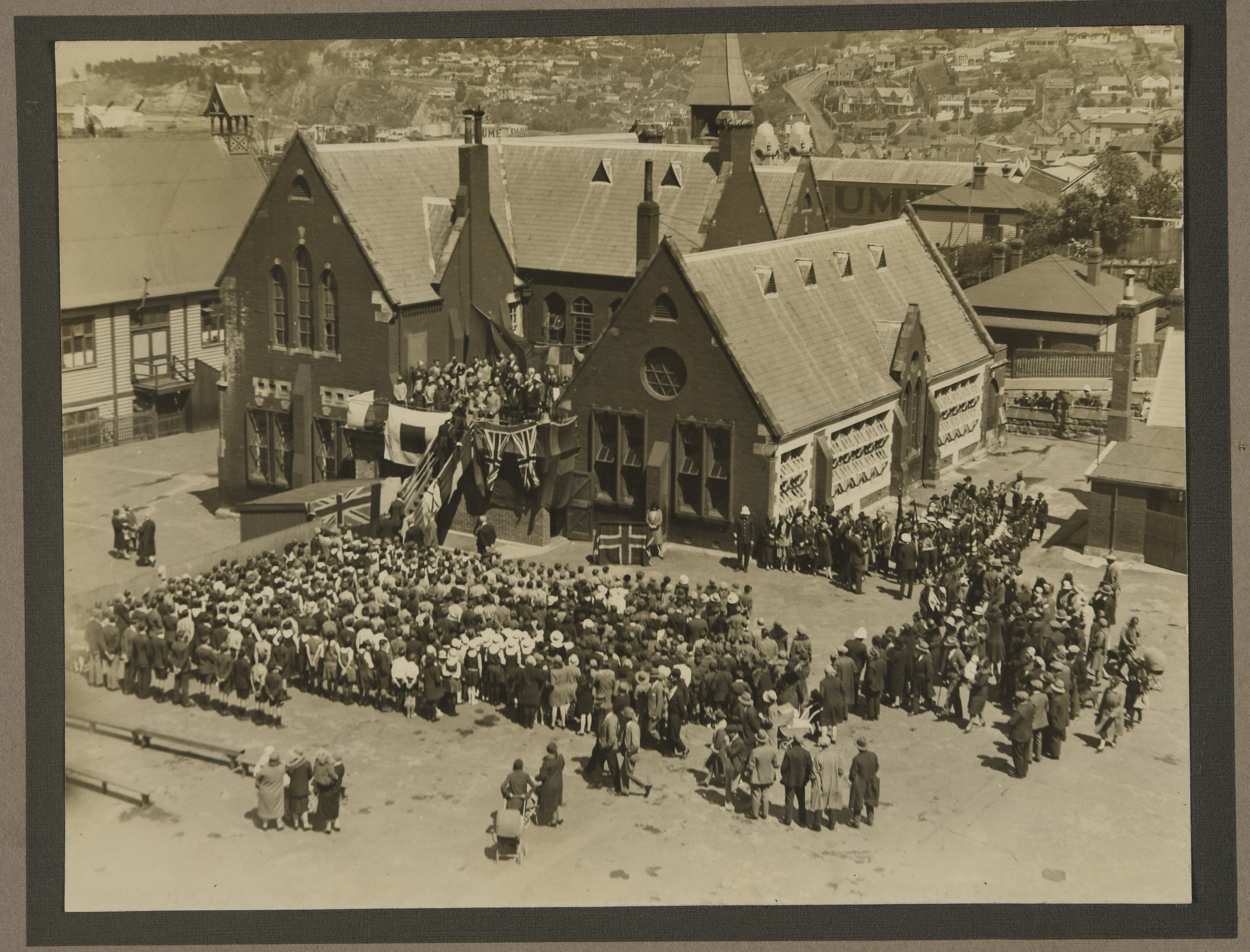
The Governor-General, Charles Bathurst, 1st Viscount Bledisloe, and Lady Bledisloe visit Lyttelton, 24 November 1930

The Lyttelton Times was one of the principal newspapers of the Canterbury region for 80 years. It was published from 1851 until 1929, at which time it became the Christchurch Times, until publication ceased in 1935.

On 1 July 1862, the first telegraph transmission in New Zealand was made from Lyttelton Post Office.

On 1 January 1908, the Nimrod Expedition, headed by Ernest Shackleton to explore Antarctica left from the harbour here.

Terra Nova Expedition member Apsley Cherry-Garrard makes mention of Lyttelton's importance to Antarctic explorers in his book, The Worst Journey in the World:

And so it was with some anticipation that on Monday morning, October 24 (presumably 1910), we could smell the land — New Zealand, that home of so many Antarctic expeditions, where we knew that we should be welcomed. Scott's Discovery, Shackleton's Nimrod, and now again Scott's Terra Nova have all in turn been berthed at the same quay in Lyttelton, for aught I know at the same No. 5 Shed, into which they have spilled out their holds, and from which they have been restowed with the addition of all that New Zealand, scorning payment, could give. And from there they have sailed, and thither their relief ships have returned year after year.

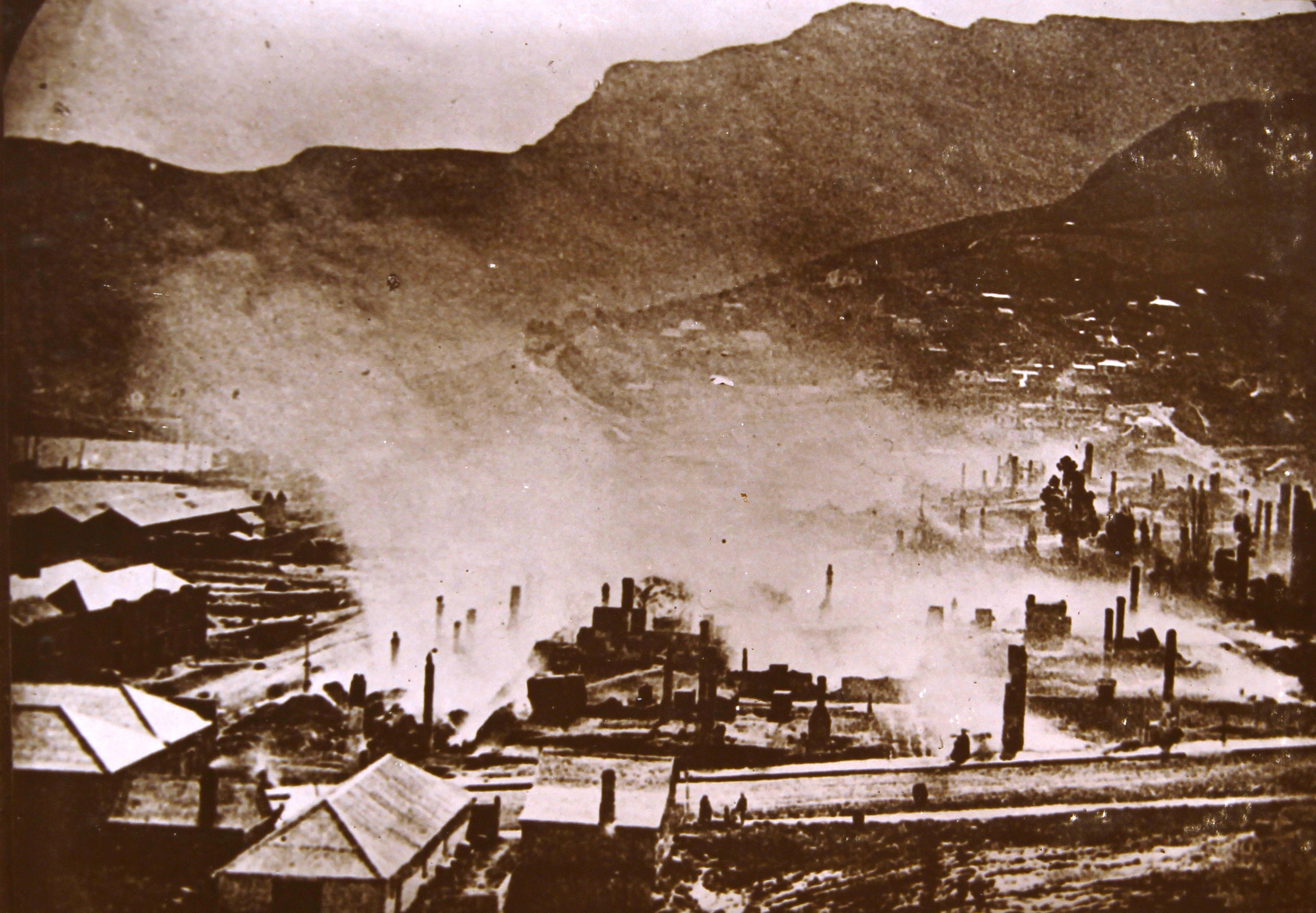
Lyttelton fire

On 24 October 1870, a fire broke out in the Queen's Hotel on London Street and soon engulfed the main centre of Lyttelton. Prisoners of the Lyttelton Gaol were let out from their cells to help combat the flames. Two thirds of Lyttelton was destroyed, with 30 businesses and many private homes burned.

The Lyttelton Harbour Board was created in 1877 to be in charge of managing the harbour.

=== 20th century ===
Modern changes in cargo shipping had a notable effect on Lyttelton. Before the introduction of shipping containers, goods were moved by hand from railway cars to coastal shipping with cranes and slings. Warehouses were needed to store wool and grain, and a large workforce of watersiders or "wharfies" needed accommodation as well as eating and drinking establishments. The advent of containerisation and the opening of the road tunnel in 1964 reduced both this workforce and the need for goods storage. Many shops and businesses, especially those catering to seamen, closed from lack of custom.

By the late 20th century, Lyttelton's rough, working-class character changed as it became a fashionable place to live, as a suburb within easy driving distance of central Christchurch. Many surviving 19th century buildings were renovated, and the cafes and boutiques opened on the main street.

==== 2010–2011 earthquakes ====
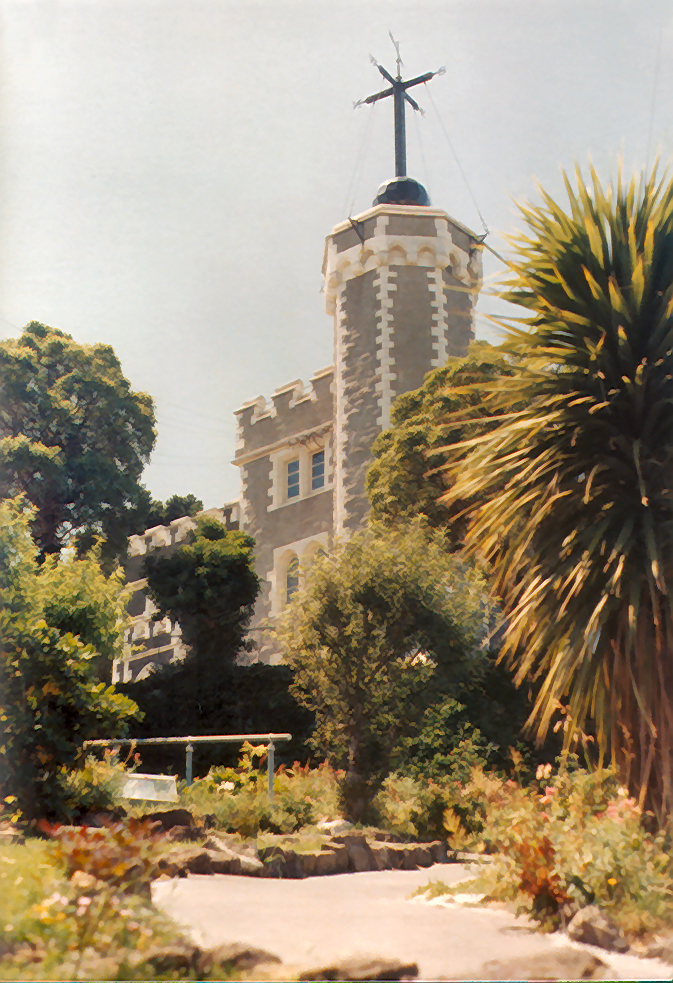
The Lyttelton Timeball Station started signalling Greenwich Mean Time to ships in the harbour in 1876, but was destroyed in the June 2011 Christchurch earthquake.

The 2010 Canterbury earthquake damaged some of Lyttelton's historic buildings, including the Timeball Station. There was some damage to the town's infrastructure, but the port facilities and tunnel quickly returned to operation. Overall quake damage was less significant than in Christchurch itself, due to the dampening effects of the solid rock that the town rests on and its moderate distance from the epicentre.

On 22 February 2011 a magnitude 6.3 aftershock caused much more widespread damage in Lyttelton than its predecessor due to its proximity to Lyttelton and a shallow depth of 5 kilometres (3.1 mi). Some walls of the Timeball Station collapsed and there was extensive damage to residential and commercial property, leading to the demolition of a number of high-profile heritage buildings such as the Harbour Light Theatre and the Empire Hotel. Many other unreinforced masonry buildings were severely damaged.

Following the February earthquake it was suggested that the Timeball Station be dismantled for safety reasons. Bruce Chapman, chief executive of the New Zealand Historic Places Trust (NZHPT) said there was a possibility that it might be reconstructed. "If we can find a way to dismantle the Timeball Station that allows us to retain as much of the building's materials as possible, we will do so." However, on Monday 13 June 2011 a further 6.3 M_{L} aftershock brought down the tower and remaining walls while workmen were preparing to dismantle it.

Much of Lyttelton's architectural heritage was lost as a result of the earthquakes, as damage was deemed too extensive for reconstruction. By June 2011, six buildings in London Street in Lyttelton had been demolished, along with another four on Norwich Quay. The town's oldest churches collapsed, including Canterbury's oldest stone church, the Holy Trinity. Following the demolition of Holy Trinity Church, St Saviour's Chapel was returned to Lyttelton to the site of Holy Trinity in 2013. The wooden St Saviour's Chapel had been relocated from West Lyttelton to Christchurch's Cathedral Grammar School in the 1970s. The Anglican church is now named St Saviour's at Holy Trinity.

== Geography ==
Lyttelton is the largest settlement on Lyttelton Harbour / Whakaraupō, an inlet on the northwestern side of Banks Peninsula extending 18 km inland from the southern end of Pegasus Bay. The town is situated on the lower slopes of the Port Hills, which form the northern side of the harbour and effectively separate Lyttelton from the city of Christchurch. This steep-sided crater rim acts as a natural amphitheatre and a boundary to urban development.

A tunnel through the Port Hills provides direct road access to Christchurch, 12 km to the northwest. The town of Sumner, some 6 km to the northeast, is accessed via Evans Pass. This road was closed after the 2011 Christchurch earthquake and reopened on 29 March 2019. Another settlement at Governors Bay lies 10 km to the west, and a frequent ferry service connects the suburb of Diamond Harbour on the southern shore of the harbour.

=== Climate ===
Climate data for Lyttelton (1991–2020)
Month	Jan	Feb	Mar	Apr	May	Jun	Jul	Aug	Sep	Oct	Nov	Dec	Year
Mean daily maximum °C (°F)	21.6 (70.9)	21.0 (69.8)	19.8 (67.6)	17.2 (63.0)	14.4 (57.9)	12.1 (53.8)	11.2 (52.2)	12.2 (54.0)	14.7 (58.5)	16.6 (61.9)	18.1 (64.6)	20.1 (68.2)	16.6 (61.9)
Daily mean °C (°F)	17.7 (63.9)	17.3 (63.1)	16.0 (60.8)	13.5 (56.3)	10.6 (51.1)	8.2 (46.8)	7.4 (45.3)	8.6 (47.5)	10.7 (51.3)	12.6 (54.7)	14.3 (57.7)	16.2 (61.2)	12.8 (55.0)
Mean daily minimum °C (°F)	13.8 (56.8)	13.7 (56.7)	12.2 (54.0)	9.7 (49.5)	6.9 (44.4)	4.4 (39.9)	3.6 (38.5)	4.9 (40.8)	6.7 (44.1)	8.6 (47.5)	10.5 (50.9)	12.3 (54.1)	8.9 (48.1)
Average rainfall mm (inches)	41.9 (1.65)	30.2 (1.19)	44.6 (1.76)	62.2 (2.45)	55.5 (2.19)	60.9 (2.40)	65.4 (2.57)	64.4 (2.54)	32.8 (1.29)	37.0 (1.46)	34.4 (1.35)	41.1 (1.62)	570.4 (22.47)
Source: NIWA (rainfall 1961–2015

== Governance ==
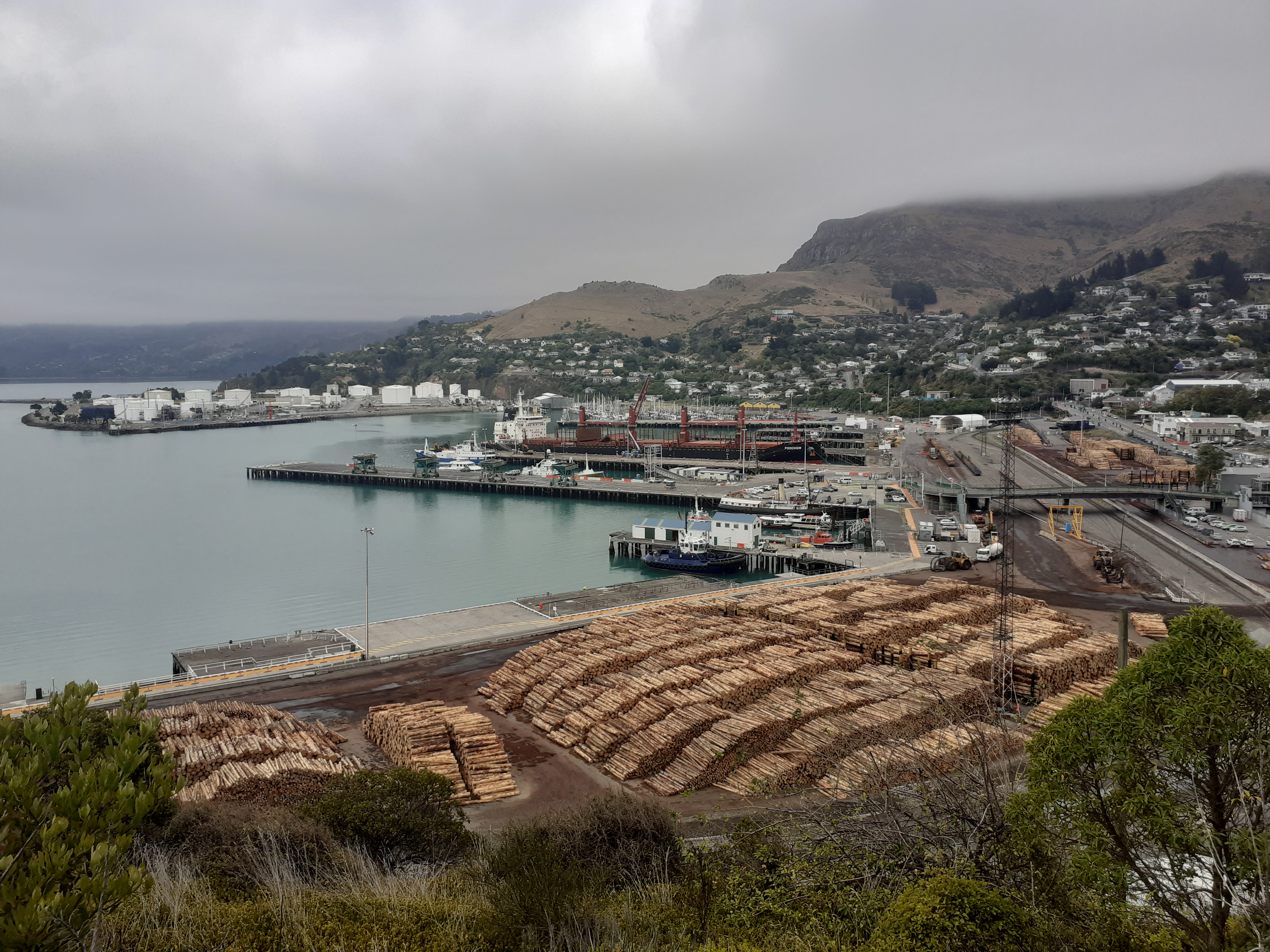
Logs awaiting export at Lyttelton Port (2021)

The Lyttelton Municipal Council was established on 3 February 1862 with elections for the members of the council. On 28 May 1868, Lyttelton was proclaimed as a borough under the Municipal Corporations Act 1867, and the functions of the Municipal Council were transferred to Lyttelton Borough.

As part of the nationwide local government reforms in 1989, the Akaroa, Mt Herbert, and Wairewa County Councils, and Lyttelton Borough Council merged to become the Banks Peninsula District Council. In November 2005, 60% of the Banks Peninsula District ratepayers who returned a postal vote chose to amalgamate with the neighbouring Christchurch City Council. The merger took place on 6 March 2006. This resulted in the creation of a new Christchurch City Council seat for the new ward of Banks Peninsula, and the creation of two Community Boards, the Lyttelton/Mt Herbert Community Board encompassing Lyttelton, Rāpaki, Governors Bay, Diamond Harbour and Port Levy, and the Akaroa/Wairewa Community Board, encompassing Akaroa, Little River, Birdlings Flat, and the settlements of the Eastern and Southern Bays of Banks Peninsula. The Akaroa/Wairewa Community Board was further divided into two subdivisions, namely the Akaroa subdivision, and the Wairewa subdivision. In October 2016 the two community boards were merged to form Te Pātaka o Rākaihautū Banks Peninsula Community Board.

== Demographics ==
Lyttelton is described by Stats NZ as a small urban area. Including the neighbouring communities of Te Rāpaki-o-Te Rakiwhakaputa, Cass Bay and Corsair Bay, it covers 4.52 km^{2} (1.75 sq mi). It had an estimated population of 3,220 as of June 2025, with a population density of 712 people per km^{2}.

Historical population
Year	Pop.	±% p.a.
2006	2,991	—
2013	2,766	−1.11%
2018	2,982	+1.52%
2023	3,123	+0.93%

Lyttelton had a population of 3,123 in the 2023 New Zealand census, an increase of 141 people (4.7%) since the 2018 census, and an increase of 357 people (12.9%) since the 2013 census. There were 1,524 males, 1,575 females, and 27 people of other genders in 1,365 dwellings. 6.6% of people identified as LGBTIQ+. The median age was 46.3 years (compared with 38.1 years nationally). There were 462 people (14.8%) aged under 15 years, 417 (13.4%) aged 15 to 29, 1,707 (54.7%) aged 30 to 64, and 537 (17.2%) aged 65 or older.

People could identify as more than one ethnicity. The results were 92.2% European (Pākehā); 11.5% Māori; 1.7% Pasifika; 3.3% Asian; 1.2% Middle Eastern, Latin American and African New Zealanders (MELAA); and 1.7% other, which includes people giving their ethnicity as "New Zealander". English was spoken by 98.0%, Māori by 3.6%, Samoan by 0.1%, and other languages by 11.9%. No language could be spoken by 1.8% (e.g. too young to talk). New Zealand Sign Language was known by 0.5%. The percentage of people born overseas was 27.3, compared with 28.8% nationally.

Religious affiliations in 2023 were 18.5% Christian, 0.1% Hindu, 0.2% Islam, 0.7% Māori religious beliefs, 0.5% Buddhist, 0.9% New Age, 0.2% Jewish, and 1.4% other religions. People who answered that they had no religion were 71.0%, and 6.4% of people did not answer the census question. Most Lyttelton residents were Protestant in the 1951 census.

Of those at least 15 years old, 1,098 (41.3%) people had a bachelor's or higher degree, 1,134 (42.6%) had a post-high school certificate or diploma, and 423 (15.9%) people exclusively held high school qualifications. The median income was $44,100, compared with $41,500 nationally. 432 people (16.2%) earned over $100,000 compared to 12.1% nationally. The employment status of those at least 15 was 1,323 (49.7%) full-time, 522 (19.6%) part-time, and 54 (2.0%) unemployed.

== Lyttelton Port ==
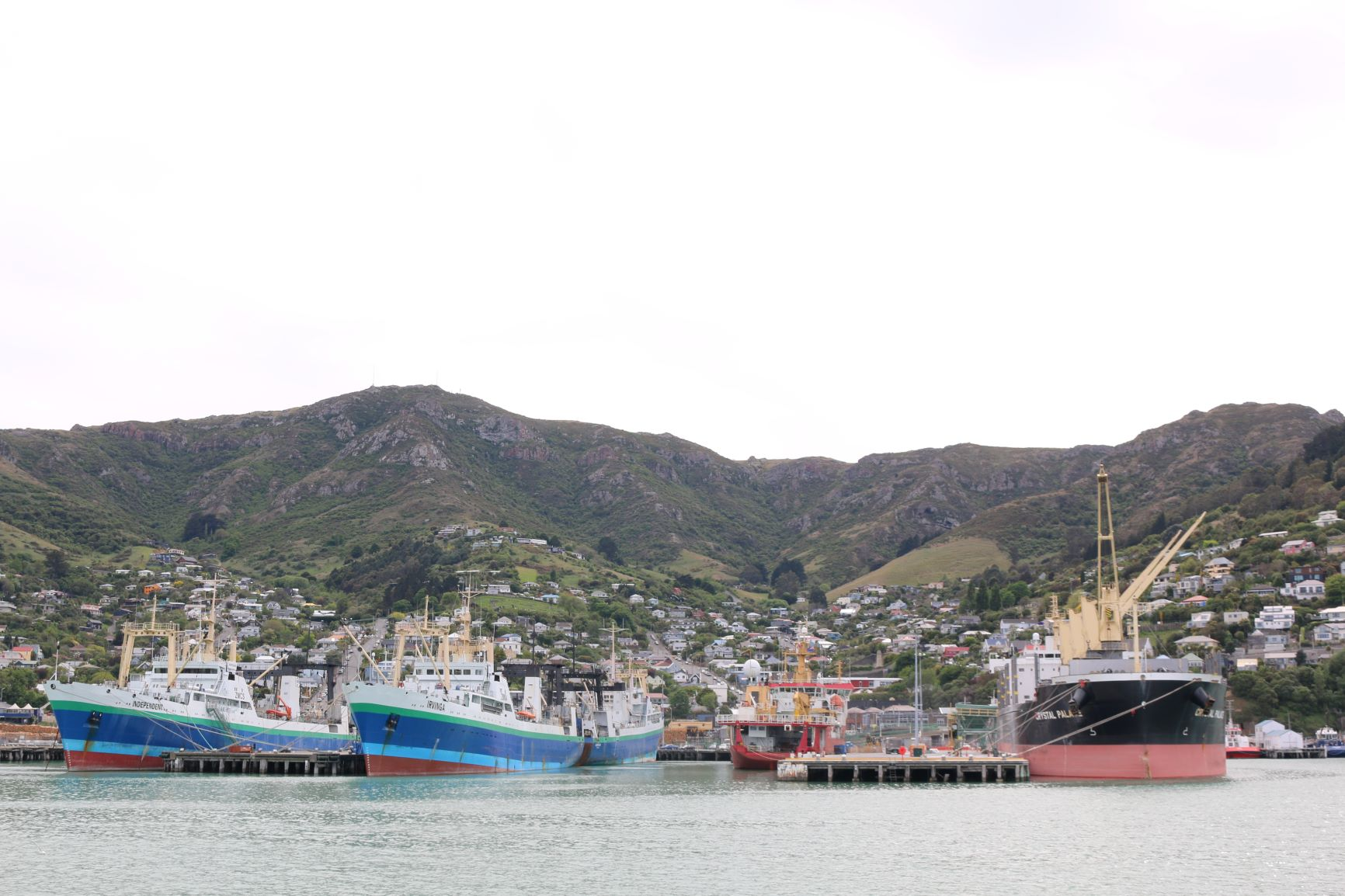
Boats tied up at the Port of Lyttelton, October 2020

Lyttelton has long been the main port of the Canterbury / Christchurch area, having been opened in 1877 by the Lyttelton Harbour Board, later becoming the Lyttelton Port Company with the introduction of the Port Companies Act in 1988.

Between 1958 and 1967 the port saw such prosperity that Kaiapoi, on the coast north of Christchurch, briefly reopened its closed port facilities for a decade, to allow smaller ships to bypass the congested Lyttelton wharves.

In the 1970s the port was chosen as one of the main ports in the South Island to be dredged and upgraded for containerisation, with the container facility opening in 1977, the centenary of the initial opening.

Substantial quantities of South Island coal have been shipped from this port for the past 100 years. The port facilities have provided for LP gas and petrol for the past 50 years. In essence the port could be viewed (based on quantities of materials shipped in or out) as the primary port for energy shipments in the South Island.

The Lyttelton Harbour Board was dissolved in 1989 after the passing of the 1988 Port Companies Act. The Harbour Board was forced to split into two separate organisations, one commercial (the Lyttelton Port Company, currently owned by Christchurch City Holdings, the commercial arm of the city council) and one non-commercial. In 1996 the Lyttelton Port Company registered on the New Zealand Stock Exchange.

A regular port of call for cruise ships, the port opened a new purpose-built pier in November 2020, able to handle the largest modern ships.

== Historic buildings ==
None of the buildings that greeted Canterbury Association settlers in 1850 survive, but many of Lyttelton's historic buildings and structures survived the changes in the shipping industry and persisted into the late 20th century. In 2009 Lyttelton was awarded Category I Historic Area status by the Historic Places Trust (NZHPT), defined as "an area of special or outstanding historical or cultural heritage significance or value", not long before many of the town's historic qualities were destroyed in the 2011 Christchurch earthquake.

=== Timeball Station ===
The Lyttelton Timeball Station was erected in 1876 and started signalling Greenwich Mean Time to ships in the harbour that year.

The castle-like building was located high on a ridge above the port with extensive views over the harbour. It was one of the world's five remaining working timeball stations until it was destroyed by the June 2011 Christchurch earthquake. The tower, but not the rest of the building, has been faithfully reconstructed and was once again in working order at the end of 2018.

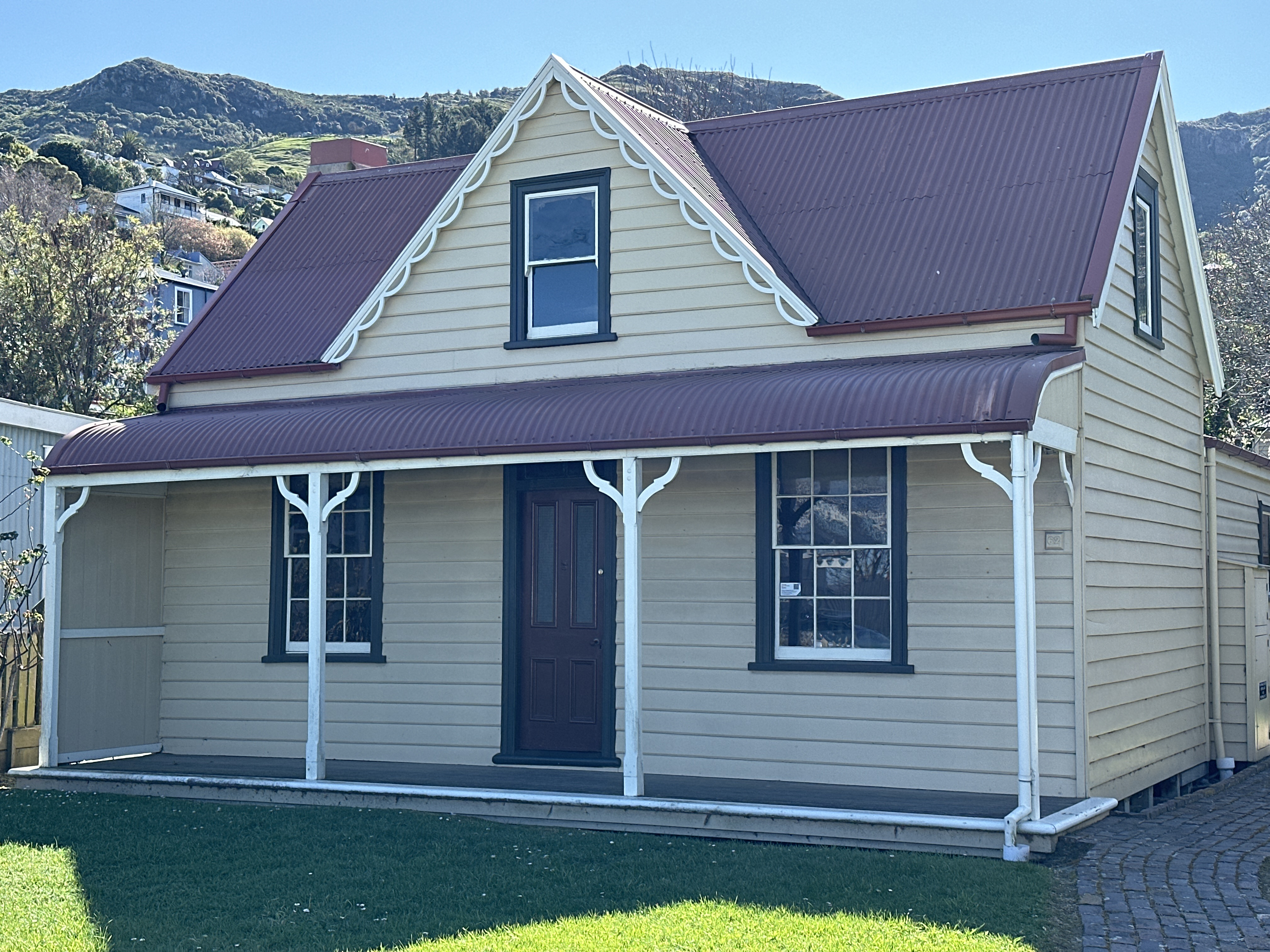
Grubb Cottage (1851/1870s)

=== Grubb Cottage ===
Shipwright John Grubb built Lyttelton's first jetty in 1850 to prepare for the arrival of Canterbury Association settlers. Afterwards he stayed in the settlement and opened a boatyard and slipway. His home still survives: the rear part was built as early as 1851 and the street-facing front portion was added in the 1870s. The house was owned by the Grubb family until 1961. A community trust bought the cottage in 2006 with the help of the Christchurch City Council and restored it.

=== Lyttelton Gaol ===
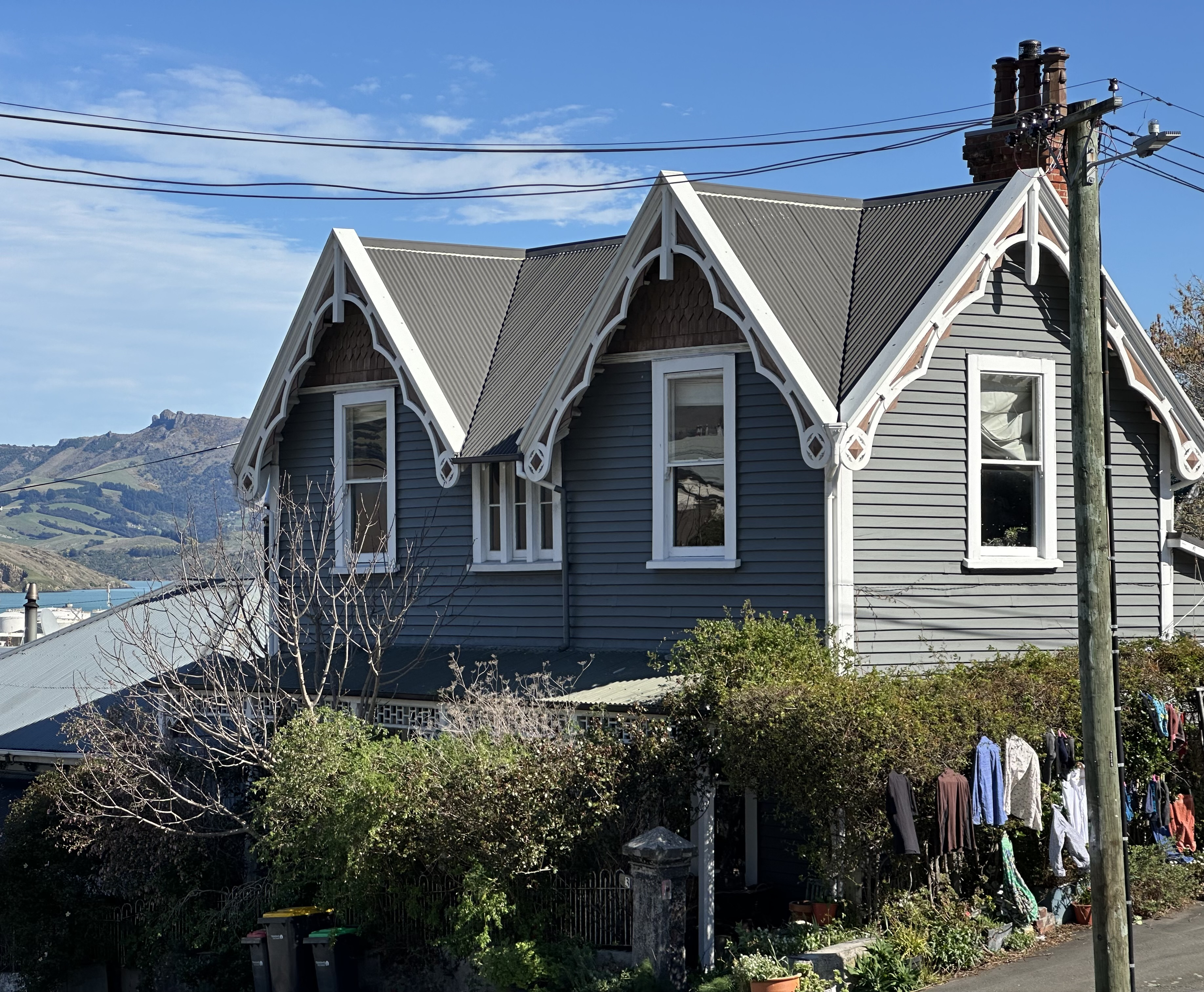
House of Lyttelton Gaol's Chief Warder (1876)

This Gothic stone and concrete gaol was designed by Benjamin Mountfort and built in stages from the 1860s. It remained the main gaol of Canterbury province until 1919, when Paparua Prison opened. Seven men were hanged at the gaol between 1868 and 1918. It was mostly demolished in 1922: the high concrete walls from the rear of the building remain as well as four cells. The Lyttelton Gaol site is now a rose garden; in the middle is the Upham Clock, a memorial to a local doctor. Charles Upham was a ship's doctor who arrived in Lyttelton in 1898, bought the local medical practice, and practised for 52 years until his death in 1950.

The 1876 house of the Chief Warder survives, across the street from the gaol. It is gabled house with notable scalloped bargeboards and an ornate verandah.

=== Churches ===
Lyttelton formerly had three 1860s churches, all on Winchester Street. All were damaged in the Christchurch earthquakes and demolished in 2011.

==== Holy Trinity ====
The first instance of this building, designed by Benjamin Mountfort, was built in 1852 of native timber which shrunk disastrously, and the church was demolished in 1857. It was replaced by a stone building designed by George Mallinson, built in 1869, and consecrated in April 1860.

==== St Joseph's ====
This Catholic church, also designed by Benjamin Mountfort in partnership with Maxwell Bury. It was built in 1865 across the road from the Holy Trinity, a simple stone building with a muklticoloured frontage.

==== St John's ====
Built in 1864 and opening on 1 January 1865, this Gothic Revival Presbyterian church was designed by S.C. Farr and built in locally-quarried stone, with a broach steeple on a square tower. It had buttresses reminiscent of Christchurch's Durham Street Methodist Church, also designed by Farr.

== Transport ==
The town is linked to Christchurch by railway and road tunnels through the Port Hills. At 1.9 km long, the Lyttelton road tunnel (opened in 1964) was the country's longest road tunnel until the Waterview Tunnel in Auckland opened in July 2017; and the railway tunnel of the Lyttelton Line section of the Main South Line, officially opened on 9 December 1867, is the country's oldest.

== Education ==
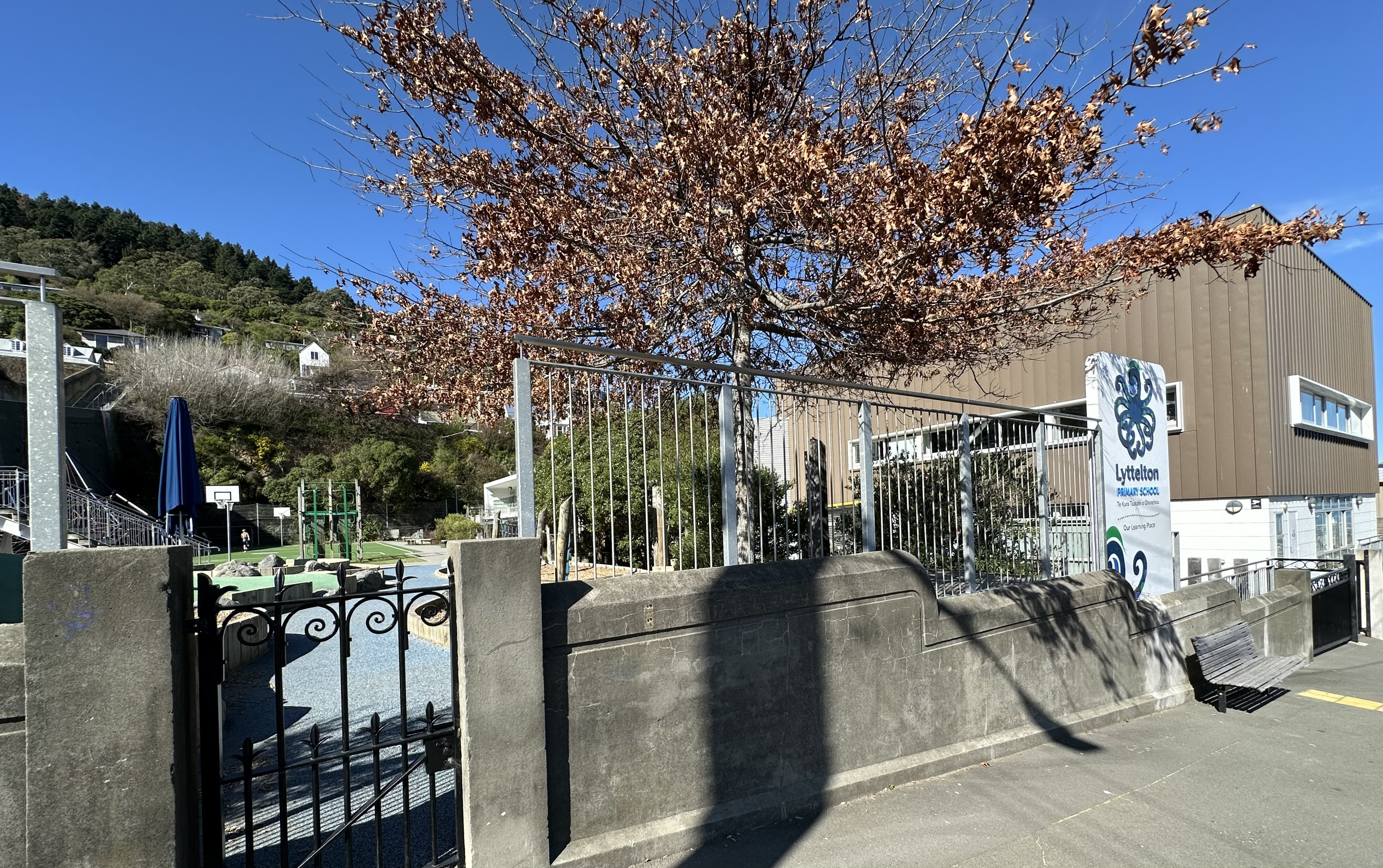
Lyttelton Primary School in 2024

Lyttelton Primary School is a full primary school catering for years 1 to 8. It had a roll of 130 as of July 2026. The school was created in 2014 by a merger of Lyttelton West and Lyttelton Main schools.

Lyttelton Borough School opened in 1874. It was replaced by Lyttelton Main School in 1941. That was torn down after the 2011 earthquakes. Lyttelton West School opened in 1887.

== In popular culture ==
Lyttelton was the location for most of the exterior scenes in Peter Jackson's 1996 horror movie The Frighteners. Paul Theroux described Lyttelton as having "pretty houses" but was frustrated by having to cycle over the Port Hills to get back to Christchurch, as cycling through the Lyttelton tunnel is not permitted, and told his wife "what an awful time I was having".

Melanie Dixon's young adult science fiction novel New Dawning is set in a future Lyttelton affected by climate change. It was released in April 2023 as the first part of a projected trilogy, The Edge of Light.

== Notable people ==
- Bill Hammond (1947–2021), artist
- Delaney Davidson (born 1972), artist and musician
- Joe Bennett (born 1957), writer and columnist
- Aldous Harding (born 1990), folk singer-songwriter
- Eileen Savell (1883–1970), farmer and volunteer nurse
- Marlon Williams (born 1990), singer-songwriter, guitarist and actor
- Mel Parsons (born 1981), singer-songwriter

== Sources ==
- Hight, James; Straubel, C. R. (1957). A History of Canterbury: Volume I : to 1854. Christchurch: Whitcombe and Tombs Ltd.
