= 1994 Selwyn by-election =

New Zealand by-election

- 13 August 1994
- Turnout: 21,667 (77.79%)

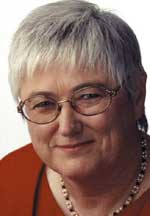

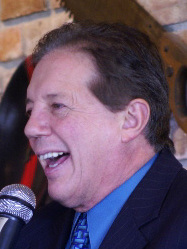
	First party	Second party
		All
Candidate	David Carter	John Wright
Party	National	Alliance
Popular vote	8,906	8,488
Percentage	42.32%	40.34%
	Third party	Fourth party
Candidate	Marian Hobbs	Tim Shadbolt
Party	Labour	NZ First
Popular vote	2,173	1,165
Percentage	10.33%	5.54%
- Carter: 40–50% 50–60% 60–70% 70–80% Wright: 40–50% 60–70% No polling places
Member before election
Ruth Richardson
National
Elected Member
David Carter
National

The Selwyn by-election, a by-election in the New Zealand electorate of Selwyn – a predominantly rural district in the Canterbury Plains in New Zealand's South Island – took place on 13 August 1994. The previous sitting MP, Ruth Richardson, precipitated the poll by resigning from parliament. Richardson planned to retire from politics, having been removed as Minister of Finance the previous year.

== Background ==
The by-election was significant, as National held on to the majority of the House of Representatives by only one seat (50 to 49). This meant the party would have lost its majority in the House if it failed to retain the seat, and it would have required the formation of a coalition or a confidence-and-supply agreement with another parliamentary party – probably New Zealand First or the Alliance – to maintain governance.

All "major" New Zealand political parties of the day contested the by-election. David Carter, the National Party candidate, won the seat, and therefore the distribution of seats in Parliament did not change. In second place, and only around four hundred votes behind Carter, came the Alliance's John Wright, with National's traditional opponent, the Labour Party, placed a distant third. The fourth "major" candidate represented the New Zealand First party: Tim Shadbolt, then Mayor of Invercargill.

== Candidates ==
Alliance

There were four nominations for the Alliance:

- Judy Hunt, a personnel manager from Geraldine who was the Alliance candidate for Rakaia in 1993
- Maureen Love, a former union delegate and teacher studying a commerce degree at Canterbury University from Christchurch
- John Wright, the leader of the Democratic Party who was the Alliance candidate for Rangiora in 1993
- Maevis Watson, a member of the Wairewa-Akaroa Community Board and registered nurse from Little River who was the NewLabour Party candidate for Selwyn in 1990

John McCaskey, the Alliance candidate for Selwyn in 1993 had also been named as a prospective candidate, but he decided not proceed with his nomination.

At a selection meeting of 150 members in Halswell, a panel of 10 chose Wright from the four nominees to be the Alliance candidate.

Labour

Labour's candidate from the 1993 election who cut Richardson's majority from 5,441 votes to 888, Ron Mark declined to stand again. Mark was a supporter of ousted Labour leader Mike Moore, which media speculated was the reason he did not stand. Mark stated that he would not stand for personal and political reasons, while both Labour leader, Helen Clark, and her deputy, David Caygill, had also made it clear they would have welcomed Mark as a candidate. Two candidates were nominated to represent Labour in the by-election:

- Marian Hobbs, principal of Avonside Girls' High School
- Geoff Stone, an Ashburton District Councillor and former Christchurch City Councillor

A third nominee, Greg Coyle, who was Labour's candidate in 1993 for Sydenham withdrew saying Hobbs' selection was a foregone conclusion.

At a selection meeting held in Belfast, Hobbs was selected as Labour's candidate. At the meeting, attended by about 100 party members, Hobbs said voters had the chance to choose between "fiscal purity" and "a system of social justice." User-pays meant that only those who could pay could use. "If you can't pay, you can't use, and that is not good enough" in her acceptance speech. She also acknowledged Mark, who had attended the selection meeting, but had left before the announcement was made.

National

The 11 nominees were narrowed to a shortlist of five candidates which went to a selection meeting ballot. The candidates were:

- Russell Bain, an executive assistant to Cabinet Minister John Luxton and former Waimakairi District Councillor
- Stuart Boag, a former Amuri County Councillor and Young Nationals chairman
- David Carter, a farm manager who was National's candidate for Lyttelton in 1993
- Christine Kelland, a banker and Canterbury Regional Councillor
- Margaret Murray, a Christchurch City Councillor who was National's candidate for Yaldhurst in 1981

At the selection meeting held at West Melton Hall delegates voted in an exhaustive ballot for the candidate. Kelland was eliminated on the first ballot, Murray on the second and Bain on the third. Carter beat Boag on the last ballot, which party sources indicated was a very close result.

New Zealand First

The New Zealand First candidate for Lyttelton in 1993, Ross Gluer, ruled himself out of standing but was named the party's campaign manager. Gluer said three people had put their names forward as potential candidates, two of them being previous candidates. Two names were made public, that of Jenny Bloxham who was the party's health spokesperson and candidate for Timaru in 1993, and Tim Shadbolt, the Mayor of Invercargill. The party selected Shadbolt. Ron Woods, the former Canterbury regional chairman for the party, who had recently been replaced by Gluer, claimed members had been kept "completely in the dark" about the selection process and said he could not think of anyone less suited to Selwyn voters than Shadbolt. Shadbolt's selection led to accusations of secret meetings and backroom dealings. However, the chairman of the party's management committee, Doug Woolerton, denied this saying the choice had been "totally democratic" and had the backing of the local party organisation.

Others

- Bruce Annan, an automobile repairer from Christchurch, stood for Kiwis Against Further Immigration
- Kieron Doak, a psychopedic assistant at the Templeton Centre, was selected as the candidate of the New Zealand Coalition. The coalition labelled itself as a moderate centre grouping made up of member of the Social Credit Party, the New Zealand Party, the United Party and some independents.
- Rosemary Francis, a teacher who had stood in Fendalton in both 1990 and 1993, was selected by the Christian Heritage Party.
- Peter Wakeman was the first person to declare their candidacy, as an independent. He had stood at the 1993 Tauranga by-election placing third. He had hoped the opposition parties might have backed him as a neutral single candidate against whoever stood for National. He later withdrew his candidacy after no parties withdrew.
- Bill Woods, the Mayor of Selwyn, contemplated standing as an independent candidate. He said he would only stand provided someone else paid his deposit stating "That's a way of telling if there is any real feeling out there."

== Results ==
The following table shows the official results as published by the Electoral Commission.

1994 Selwyn by-election
Party	Candidate	Votes	%	±%
National	David Carter	8,906	42.32	
Alliance	John Wright	8,488	40.33	
Labour	Marian Hobbs	2,173	10.33	
NZ First	Tim Shadbolt	1,165	5.54	
Christian Heritage	Rosemary Francis	182	0.86	
NORML	Warren Bryson	39	0.19	
Kiwis Against Further Immigration	Bruce Annan	29	0.14	
McGillicuddy Serious	Tim Owens	26	0.12	
Natural Law	Warwick Jones	22	0.10	
NZ Coalition	Kieron Daok	10	0.05	
Christ's Ambassadors Union	Victor Bryer	2	0.01	
Majority		418	1.99	
Turnout		21,042		

=== By polling place ===
Results by polling place
Polling place (Note: Geocoded polling place data can be found here)	Carter (NAT)	Wright (ALL)	Hobbs (LAB)	Shadbolt (NZF)	Francis (CH)	Bryson (NML)	Annan (KAFI)	Owens (MSP)	Jones (NLP)	Daok (NZ)	Bryer (CAU)	Valid	Informal
Gaiety Hall, Rue Jolie, Akaroa	241	185	77	30	1	2	2	0	0	0	0	538	0
Public Hall, Duvauchelle	76	57	23	19	2	3	0	1	0	0	0	181	1
School, Le Bons Bay	26	17	9	6	0	0	0	0	0	0	0	58	0
Public Hall, Little Akaloa	20	15	3	0	0	0	0	0	0	0	0	38	2
NZ Post Agency, Little River	154	126	32	23	3	1	0	0	0	1	0	340	0
Public School, Okains Bay	30	12	8	0	0	0	0	1	1	0	0	52	0
Public School, Piegeon Bay	36	14	0	3	0	0	0	0	0	0	0	53	0
Correspondence School, Wainui	40	9	4	2	0	0	0	0	0	0	0	55	0
School, Broadfield	174	71	5	16	1	0	0	0	0	0	0	267	0
Burnham School, Chaytor Avenue, Burnham	210	147	41	43	5	1	3	0	1	0	0	451	1
Darfield Public School, Ross Street, Darfield	231	174	32	31	9	2	2	0	0	0	0	481	0
St. Johns Ambulance HQ, Darfield	261	238	23	25	6	0	1	0	1	0	0	555	1
Public School, Grendale	64	37	5	4	1	0	1	0	0	0	0	112	0
Oaklands Public School, Cunningham Place, Halswell	243	382	60	25	5	3	0	1	1	0	0	720	1
St. Mary’s Anglican Church Hall, 329 Halswell Road, Halswell	638	753	160	72	11	3	1	3	2	0	0	1,643	2
Halswell Public School, 437 Halswell Road, Halswell	520	415	113	31	5	2	0	1	2	0	0	1,089	1
Catholic Church Hall, Nicholls Road, Halswell	449	408	108	47	5	2	1	0	1	0	0	1,021	1
Kirwee Model School, School Lane, Kirwee	211	109	21	15	5	0	2	3	0	4	0	370	1
Public School, Ladbrooks	126	58	7	11	0	0	0	0	0	0	0	202	0
DOC Nursery, Motukarara	113	47	7	8	2	1	0	0	0	0	0	178	0
Prebbleton Public School, Blakes Road, Prebbleton	308	279	73	47	10	0	2	2	0	0	0	721	1
Rolleston School, Springston-Rolleston Road, Rolleston	288	386	52	50	9	0	0	0	1	0	0	786	1
Public School, Tai Tapu	244	140	22	14	3	0	0	0	2	0	0	425	0
Templeton Public School, Kirk Road, Templeton	390	504	97	79	3	0	1	1	1	1	0	1,077	0
Public School, Weedons	173	97	22	16	0	0	2	0	0	0	0	310	0
Public School, West Melton	562	210	41	46	22	1	2	0	0	0	1	885	1
Blackburn’s Garage, 38 Woodside Common, Westmorland	274	114	32	13	5	0	1	1	3	0	0	443	0
Yaldhurst School, School Road, Yaldhurst	214	125	28	25	2	1	1	0	0	0	0	396	0
Belfast School, Main North Road, Belfast	368	455	136	57	7	3	2	1	2	0	0	1,031	2
Salvation Army Hall, 794 Main North Road, Belfast	226	327	142	48	13	3	0	1	0	2	0	762	2
St. James Church Hall, Harewood Road, Harewood	170	101	24	10	6	0	0	1	2	0	0	314	1
Public Hall, Kainga	29	160	40	17	1	0	2	0	1	0	0	250	0
Charles Street Community Centre, Kaiapoi	275	542	154	85	4	2	1	0	0	0	0	1,063	2
St. John Ambulance Hall, Hilton Street, Kaiapoi	266	439	126	54	12	3	1	2	1	1	0	905	2
Kaiapoi High School Auditorium, Ohoka Road, Kaiapoi	425	603	189	81	10	3	0	3	0	0	0	1,314	3
Kaiapoi North School, 278 Williams Street, Kaiapoi	138	271	100	43	5	0	0	0	0	0	0	557	0
Ouruhia Model School, 21 Turners Road, Ouruhia	102	34	12	7	0	1	1	0	0	0	0	157	1
Hospital votes	48	28	24	5	2	0	0	1	0	0	1	109	0
Ordinary votes before polling day	257	179	48	21	3	1	0	0	0	1	0	510	0
Special votes before polling day	144	116	48	15	3	1	0	1	0	0	0	328	0
Special votes on polling day	115	83	19	19	1	0	0	0	0	0	0	237	0
Overseas special votes including defence force votes	27	21	6	2	0	0	0	2	0	0	0	58	0
Total	8,906	8,488	2,173	1,165	182	39	29	26	22	10	2	2,1042	27
