= 1947 Avon by-election =

New Zealand by-election

← 1946 general	28 May 1947	1949 general →
- Turnout: 13,035 (84.43%)
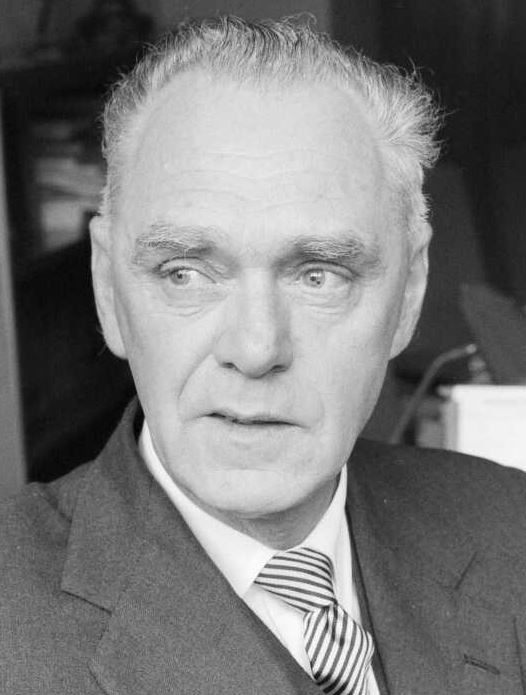

Candidate	John Mathison	Robert Alexander McDowell
Party	Labour	National
Popular vote	8,513	4,422
Percentage	65.31	33.92
Member before election
Dan Sullivan
Labour
Elected Member
John Mathison
Labour

The 1947 Avon by-election was a by-election held during the 28th New Zealand Parliament in the Christchurch electorate of Avon. The by-election occurred following the death of MP Dan Sullivan and was won by John Mathison.

== Background ==
Dan Sullivan, who was first elected to represent Avon for the Labour Party in 1919, died on 8 April 1947. This triggered the Avon by-election, which occurred on 28 May 1947.

== Candidates ==
=== Labour ===
There were six nominations for the Labour Party nomination:

- Archie Grant, secretary of the Canterbury Trades Council of the Federation of Labour
- Mrs. A. J. Jones, a charity worker and member of Labour's Aranui branch
- Margaret Mackwell, the matron of the Glendower Maternity Hospital and member of the Canterbury Trained Nurses' Association
- George Manning, a Christchurch City Councillor and secretary of the Canterbury branch of the Workers' Educational Association
- John Mathison, a member of the Christchurch Transport Board and Labour candidate for Hurunui in 1946
- Alan Williams, secretary of the North Canterbury Labour Representation Committee and Labour candidate for Fendalton in 1946

Two other expected candidates, Jack Roberts and Alan Sharp, declined nomination. Roberts, president of both the North Canterbury Labour Representation Committee and Canterbury Trades Council of the Federation of Labour, committed himself to union activities while Sharp (who was Labour's candidate for Selwyn in 1946) wished to run in Selwyn again at the next general election. With Roberts' declination Mathison was seen as the frontrunner for the nomination. Mathison was subsequently selected as Labour's nominee.

=== National ===
Dr. Robert Alexander McDowell, a medical doctor from Kaiapoi and representative of the Canterbury division on the council of the New Zealand branch of the British Medical Association, was the only nominee for the National Party candidacy. He was National candidate for Avon in 1946.

=== Others ===
John Ramby Robertson was an independent candidate. Robertson was a member of the Democratic Labour Party (DLP) but his nomination was refused endorsement by DLP leader John A. Lee. Robertson had stood unsuccessfully as a DLP candidate for the Christchurch City Council in 1944.

The Communist Party decided not to put forward a candidate. The party's Christchurch secretary, Jack Locke, stated his party had no wish to embarrass the Government (whose policies they mostly supported) by drawing away votes.

== Previous election ==
1946 general election: Avon
Party	Candidate	Votes	%	±%
Labour	Dan Sullivan	9,539	68.64	+7.44
National	Robert Alexander McDowell	4,359	31.36	
Majority		5,180	37.27	+5.83
Turnout		13,898	92.74	+2.11
Registered electors		15,092		

== Results ==
The following table gives the election results:

1947 Avon by-election
Party	Candidate	Votes	%	±%
Labour	John Mathison	8,513	65.31	
National	Robert Alexander McDowell	4,422	33.92	+2.56
Independent	John Ramby Robertson	100	0.77	
Majority		4,091	31.38	−5.89
Turnout		13,035	84.43	−9.31
Labour hold		Swing	−3.33	

Mathison obtained 65.31% of the votes and was successful.

== See also ==
- List of New Zealand by-elections
- 1887 Avon by-election
