= 1868 Avon by-election =

New Zealand by-election

| ← 1867 by-election | 8 June 1868 | 1871 general → |
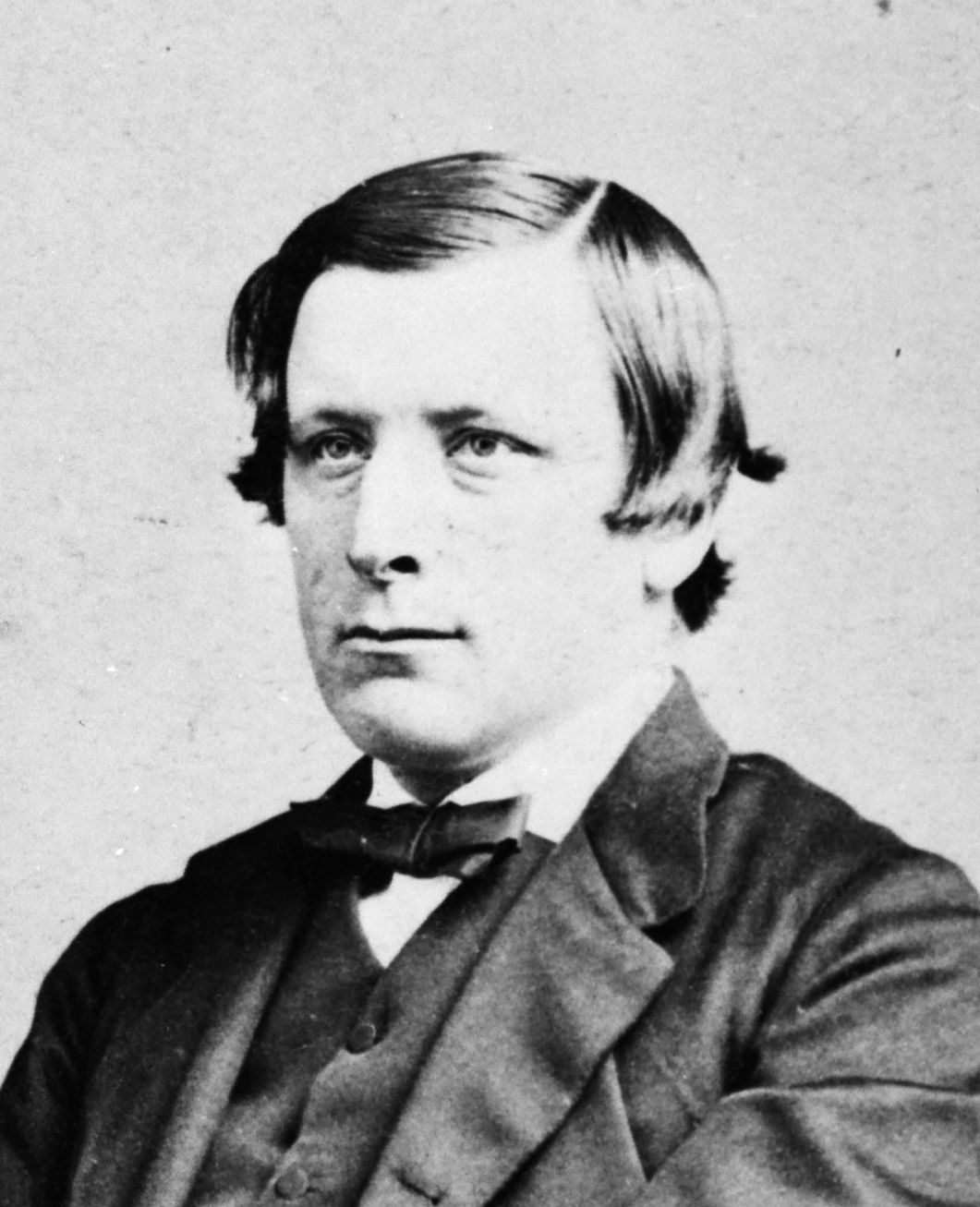
| Candidate | William Rolleston |
| Party | Independent |
MP before election
William Reeves
Independent
Elected MP
William Rolleston
Independent

The 1868 Avon by-election was a by-election held on 8 June during the 4th New Zealand Parliament in the Christchurch electorate of Avon.

The by-election was caused by the resignation of the incumbent MP William Reeves on 2 May 1868. Reeves had been elected in the 11 March 1867 Avon by-election and after attending the 1867 parliamentary session, he resigned as his business partner had died in late 1867.

Reeves' notice of resignation, dated 2 May, first appeared in newspapers on 5 May. On that same day, the local newspapers The Press and the Lyttelton Times published a requisition signed by 362 electors addressed to William Rolleston, urging him to stand, as well as his lengthy response acceding to that request. In his response, Rolleston outlined his political views: in contrast to the outgoing Superintendent of Canterbury, William Sefton Moorhouse, Rolleston wanted to be prudent with his capital programme and cut back public debts; he favoured the careful and deliberate abolition of provincial governments but saw no haste to action this measure; he advocated a better system of distribution of the provincial revenues handed to the central government (as Canterbury paid more than its fair share).

The by-election unfolded during the upcoming election for the superintendency of the Canterbury Province. Moorhouse, whose popularity had sunk to a low, had resigned in early April 1868 over personal financial difficulties. Moorhouse was encouraged by some voters to make himself available for the Avon by-election but he stated that he was not prepared to stand; his financial difficulties were not public knowledge at the time. On 22 May 1868, Rolleston was elected unopposed to the highest political office in Canterbury.

Rolleston had since 1865 been a public servant, appointed by Premier Frederick Weld as the Under Secretary in the Native Department. Rolleston needed to wind up his role in Wellington and left for the capital after he announced his candidacy for both the Superintendency and the Avon electorate. Rolleston's resignation from the Native Department was gazetted later in May. On 19 May, Rolleston arrived back at Lyttelton from Wellington.

The nomination meeting was set for Tuesday, 8 June 1868 at the Papanui school, with an election (if necessary) to be held the following day. Thomas Maude (the father of Nurse Maude) acted as the returning officer. The Papanui land owner Henry Matson proposed Rolleston and William Lane—best known for his ownership of Mill Island in the Avon River—seconded the nomination. As there were no other nominations, Rolleston won the Avon by-election unopposed.

The by-election success was the beginning of Rolleston's long parliamentary career. He remained a member of parliament until 1899, with two three-year breaks. In total, he spent 25 years in Parliament.
