= List of strikes in New Zealand =

Throughout the history of New Zealand, there have been a number of strikes, labour disputes, student strikes, hunger strikes and other industrial actions.

== 19th century ==
- 1821 Māori timber workers' strike
- 1889 Wellington schoolboys' strike

== 20th century ==
=== 1900s ===
- 1908 Blackball miners' strike

=== 1910s ===
- Waihi miners' strike
- 1913 Great Strike

=== 1930s ===
- 1932 Christchurch tramway strike

=== 1940s ===
- Featherston prisoner of war camp incident

=== 1950s ===
- 1951 New Zealand waterfront dispute

=== 1970s ===
- 1979 New Zealand general strike

=== 1980s ===
- 1984 Air New Zealand strike, by Air New Zealand flight attendants.

== 21st century ==
=== 2000s ===
- 2006 Progressive Enterprises dispute
- 2007 Spotless dispute

=== 2020s ===
- 2021 New Zealand nurses strike

== See also ==
- Labour rights in New Zealand
