= Alfred Richard Creyke =

New Zealand politician (1831–1892)

Alfred Richard Creyke JP

Member of the New Zealand Parliament for Avon
- In office 1861–1862

Personal details
- Born: 1 September 1831 England
- Died: 30 November 1892 (aged 61) London, England
- Spouse: Elizabeth Rose Rebecca Creyke (née Bradshaw)
- Profession: Runholder

Alfred Richard Creyke JP (1 September 1831 – 30 November 1892) was an Englishman who was briefly Member of the New Zealand Parliament for Avon. He was a significant landholder in Canterbury, New Zealand and spent just over ten years in the colony before returning home.

== Early life ==
Creyke was the third son of the Rev.d Stephen Creyke, vicar of Okeover, Staffordshire, north-east of Ashbourne, Derbyshire, England. His father was later archdeacon of York.

Creyke emigrated to New Zealand, travelling on the Canterbury (at the time a new ship). The ship left the East India Docks in London on 18 June 1851 and arrived in Lyttelton on 18 October with 143 passengers and staff on board.

== Life in New Zealand ==
=== Commercial interests ===
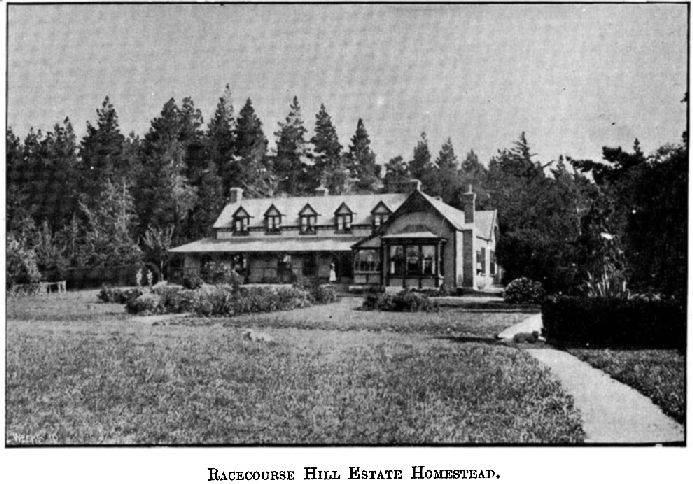
Racecourse Hill Estate homestead (date unknown, but pre-1903)

Creyke had a large sheep run on the Canterbury Plains that he managed together with his friend and business partner John Watts-Russell on behalf of an absentee land holder, and had his own land. The run's homestead was located at Racecourse Hill, about halfway between Darfield and Waddington. He sold the station in 1860 or 1861.

Watts-Russell bought the Dalethorpe run off the Deans brothers from Riccarton in 1851 and owned it until 1866, when he sold most of his property prior to going overseas. In the early years, he had this run managed by Creyke. Watts-Russell had named it Dalethorpe after a family property back in his native Staffordshire. It is located in the Malvern Hills (named after the English Malvern Hills) behind Homebush, with Dalethorpe Road leading into the area.

Creyke also bought rural sections RS 238 and 239 in Sydenham. The area is these days the largest remaining length of strip shopping in Christchurch, with Colombo Street running through it. He had land in Kaiapoi. He owned a significant amount of property in Linwood in the area that is now Linwood Avenue (Rural Sections 1144–1151, coming to 509 acres).

=== Okeover homestead ===
In 1858, he built a homestead that he called Okeover. These days, the homestead and the land belong to the University of Canterbury. The Ilam School of Fine Arts moved into the Okeover homestead in 1957 (it was the first department to move to the new site in Ilam), and moved into a new building in 1979. These days, the Continuing & Bridging Education department uses the building.

=== Other ===
Creyke was one of the first members of the Canterbury Jockey Club. Creyke was described as being "anything but easy-going".

== Political career ==
New Zealand Parliament
Years	Term	Electorate	Party
1861–1862	3rd	Avon	Independent

Creyke was elected unopposed in the 1861 general election in the new Avon electorate for Parliament, whilst William Thomson stood in the same electorate for the Canterbury Provincial Council. Thomson proposed Creyke and vice versa; both were elected unopposed. Creyke resigned from Parliament on 21 April 1862. Creyke was succeeded by William Thomson, who was elected in the 11 June 1862 by-election and took his oath on 30 July 1862.

All Canterbury MPs who stood for election for the Canterbury Provincial Council later in 1861 had in common that they did not get elected. The ones affected were Crosbie Ward (representing Lyttelton in Parliament, standing for Lyttelton in the Provincial Council), Isaac Cookson (representing Kaiapoi, standing for Lyttelton), John Cracroft Wilson (representing the City of Christchurch electorate, standing for Christchurch), and Creyke (standing for the Avon district).

== Later life ==
Creyke returned to England in the early 1860s.

On 28 April 1877 at the British Embassy in Paris, he married Elizabeth Rose Rebecca Watts-Russell (née Bradshaw), the widow of Watts-Russell (who had died on 2 April 1875).

Alfred Creyke died on 30 November 1892 at 112, Eaton Square, London. His address at death was Eaton Square and Holbrook, a suburb of Horsham in West Sussex. He left a considerable estate in excess of £180,000. Through his will, he distributed his wealth to his wider family plus his wife, who also inherited all his remaining estate in New Zealand.

In 1894, his widow arranged for the western porch of the Christ Church Cathedral to be built in his memory. On the south side of the Cathedral's nave, there is also a Watts-Russell Memorial Window in memory of her first husband. His wife died on 7 October 1905 at Horsham.

Creyke Road in Ilam is named after him. The University of Canterbury has used the name Okeover for various features. Okeover Stream is a tributary to the Avon River and flows through the university grounds. The name was gazetted upon the university's suggestion by the New Zealand Geographic Board in 1968. Okeover Street is located in Linwood.

New Zealand Parliament
New constituency	Member of Parliament for Avon; 1861–1862	Succeeded by William Thomson
