= Avon (New Zealand electorate) =

Avon is a former New Zealand parliamentary electorate. It was created for the 1861 general election and existed until 1996. It was represented by 13 Members of Parliament and was held by Independents, Liberal Party or Labour Party representatives.

== Population centres ==
The electorate was in Christchurch, New Zealand, named after the Avon River. For the 1887 by-election, polling booths were in Riccarton and Papanui. For the 1887 general election, polling booths were in Papanui, Bright's Road, Spreydon and New Brighton. For the 1890 election, polling booths were in Papanui, Richmond, Belfast, Ohoka and Clarkville.

== History ==
The electorate was created in 1861, and existed continuously until 1996, when with MMP it was absorbed into the new Christchurch East electorate.

Alfred Richard Creyke stood in the 1861 general election (held on 1 February) in the Avon electorate for Parliament, whilst William Thomson stood in the same electorate for the Canterbury Provincial Council. Thomson proposed Creyke and vice versa; both were elected unopposed. Creyke thus became the first representative. Creyke resigned from Parliament on 21 April 1862.

Creyke was succeeded by William Thomson, who was elected in the 11 June 1862 by-election and took his oath on 30 July 1862. He retired on 27 January 1866. Thomson was succeeded by Crosbie Ward, who won the 1866 election against Charles Wellington Bishop (brother of Edward Bishop). Ward resigned in the following year.

William Reeves won the resulting 1867 by-election by-election. He resigned in the following year. William Rolleston represented the electorate from the resulting 1868 by-election (elected unopposed) to 1884. In the 1879 general election, he was returned unopposed. Rolleston did not stand in the Avon electorate in the 1884 election, but (successfully) contested Geraldine instead.

Rolleston was succeeded by Leonard Harper in the Avon electorate. Harper resigned on 3 May 1887, and the resulting by-election was contested by Edwin Blake and William Dunlop, who received 255 and 252 votes, respectively. The 1887 general election was contested by Edwin Blake and E. G. Wright. Blake won the election by a good margin. In the 1890 election, Edwin Blake and George Gatonby Stead received 774 and 587 votes, respectively. At the end of the parliamentary term in 1893, Blake retired from politics.

William Tanner won the 1893 election. In the previous Parliament, he had represented the Heathcote electorate. Tanner was initially an independent, but joined the Liberal Party for the 1905 election. In the 1908 election, he was beaten by George Russell in the second ballot (the voting system in place from 1908 until 1913). In the 1911 election, four candidates contested the electorate, with Russell representing the liberal Ward Government, James McCombs standing as an Independent Liberal, J. O. Jamieson as an opposition candidate and W. R. Smith representing labour interests. Russell and McCombs polled 3,040 and 2,817 votes, respectively, and proceeded to the second ballot. Russell won the second ballot with 3,854 to 3,583 votes. Russell was defeated in the 1919 election by Labour's Dan Sullivan. Sullivan was successful at the next eight subsequent elections. In the 1943 election, he was opposed by James Neil Clarke of the National Party, who a few years later became Deputy-Mayor of Christchurch. Sullivan died in office on 8 April 1947.

Sullivan's death caused the 1947 by-election by-election, which was won by John Mathison of the Labour Party. He was a cabinet minister from 1957 to 1960 in the Second Labour Government and retired from Parliament in 1972.

Mathison was succeeded by Mary Batchelor, who represented the electorate for five parliamentary terms. Batchelor in turn was succeeded by Larry Sutherland, who won the 1987 election. He served the electorate until its abolition in 1996. He successfully contested the replacement electorate of Christchurch East in the 1996 election.

=== Members of Parliament ===
Key

Independent Liberal–Labour Liberal Labour

Election	Winner
1861 election	Alfred Richard Creyke
1862 by-election	William Thomson
1866 election	Crosbie Ward
1867 by-election	William Reeves
1868 by-election	William Rolleston
1871 election	William Rolleston
1875 election	William Rolleston
1879 election	William Rolleston
1881 election	William Rolleston
1884 election	Leonard Harper
1887 by-election	Edwin Blake
1887 election	Edwin Blake
1890 election	Edwin Blake
1893 election	William Tanner
1896 election	William Tanner
1899 election	William Tanner
1902 election	William Tanner
1905 election	William Tanner
1908 election	George Russell
1911 election	George Russell
1914 election	George Russell
1919 election	Dan Sullivan
1922 election	Dan Sullivan
1925 election	Dan Sullivan
1928 election	Dan Sullivan
1931 election	Dan Sullivan
1935 election	Dan Sullivan
1938 election	Dan Sullivan
1943 election	Dan Sullivan
1946 election	Dan Sullivan
1947 by-election	John Mathison
1949 election	John Mathison
1951 election	John Mathison
1954 election	John Mathison
1957 election	John Mathison
1960 election	John Mathison
1963 election	John Mathison
1966 election	John Mathison
1969 election	John Mathison
1972 election	Mary Batchelor
1975 election	Mary Batchelor
1978 election	Mary Batchelor
1981 election	Mary Batchelor
1984 election	Mary Batchelor
1987 election	Larry Sutherland
1990 election	Larry Sutherland
1993 election	Larry Sutherland
(Electorate abolished in 1996; see Christchurch East)

== Election results ==
=== 1993 election ===
1993 general election: Avon
Party	Candidate	Votes	%	±%
Labour	Larry Sutherland	9,835	50.68	+0.03
Alliance	Marie Venning	4,192	21.60	
National	David Kearns	3,799	19.57	
NZ First	Celeste Ryall	906	4.66	
Christian Heritage	Bill Smith	396	2.04	
Independent	Dave Penney	110	0.56	−0.03
McGillicuddy Serious	Kate Middleton	97	0.49	
Natural Law	David Lees	69	0.35	
Majority		5,643	29.08	+6.05
Turnout		19,404	82.52	+1.67
Registered electors		23,514		

=== 1990 election ===
1990 general election: Avon
Party	Candidate	Votes	%	±%
Labour	Larry Sutherland	9,345	50.65	−13.29
National	Wendy Rush	5,095	27.61	−1.43
NewLabour	Val Quinn	2,170	11.76	
Green	Dan-mark Gibson	1,238	6.71	
Democrats	Sue Stevens	275	1.49	−7.70
Social Credit	Kevin Earle	110	0.59	
Independent	Dave Penney	109	0.59	
Independent	Colin Mehlhopt	63	0.34	
Independent	Roger Keys	28	0.15	
Communist League	Eugen LePou	16	0.08	
Majority		4,250	23.03	−11.86
Turnout		18,449	80.85	−1.62
Registered electors		22,818		

=== 1987 election ===
1987 general election: Avon
Party	Candidate	Votes	%	±%
Labour	Larry Sutherland	11,585	63.94	
National	Wendy Rush	5,263	29.04	
Democrats	Sue Stevens	1,065	9.19	
Wizard Party	Ian David Costello	205	1.76	
Majority		6,322	34.89	
Turnout		18,118	82.47	−9.72
Registered electors		21,968		

=== 1984 election ===
1984 general election: Avon
Party	Candidate	Votes	%	±%
Labour	Mary Batchelor	11,838	60.00	−0.42
National	Andrew Cowie	4,067	20.61	
NZ Party	Robin Groufsky	2,701	13.69	
Social Credit	Bill Morgan	941	4.77	
Values	Denise Anker	180	0.91	
Majority		7,771	39.39	−0.64
Turnout		19,727	92.19	+5.14
Registered electors		21,397		

=== 1981 election ===
1981 general election: Avon
Party	Candidate	Votes	%	±%
Labour	Mary Batchelor	11,500	60.42	+4.35
National	Colin McNicholl	3,880	20.38	
Social Credit	Peter Barrow	3,557	18.68	+6.05
Wizard Party	Ian David Costello	95	0.49	
Majority		7,620	40.03	−4.41
Turnout		19,032	87.05	+18.15
Registered electors		21,861		

=== 1978 election ===
1978 general election: Avon
Party	Candidate	Votes	%	±%
Labour	Mary Batchelor	11,972	64.77	+5.35
National	Tom George	3,757	20.32	−7.64
Social Credit	Peter Barrow	2,335	12.63	+6.54
Values	Robert Clarkson	399	2.15	−4.36
Socialist Action	Lois McGregor	20	0.10	
Majority		8,215	44.44	+12.99
Turnout		18,483	68.90	−10.78
Registered electors		26,824		

=== 1975 election ===
1975 general election: Avon
Party	Candidate	Votes	%	±%
Labour	Mary Batchelor	10,395	59.42	−6.14
National	Tom George	4,892	27.96	
Values	Robert Clarkson	1,140	6.51	
Social Credit	Peter Barrow	1,067	6.09	−1.76
Majority		5,503	31.45	−8.19
Turnout		17,494	79.68	−6.45
Registered electors		21,954		

=== 1972 election ===
1972 general election: Avon
Party	Candidate	Votes	%	±%
Labour	Mary Batchelor	10,013	65.56	
National	Gordon Thomas	3,958	25.91	
Social Credit	Peter Barrow	1,200	7.85	−0.79
New Democratic	Rona Thelning	101	0.66	
Majority		6,055	39.64	
Turnout		15,272	86.13	−0.13
Registered electors		17,730		

=== 1969 election ===
1969 general election: Avon
Party	Candidate	Votes	%	±%
Labour	John Mathison	9,389	64.63	+5.83
National	Alistair Ansell	3,789	26.08	
Social Credit	Peter Barrow	1,256	8.64	−7.66
Communist	Jack Locke	92	0.63	
Majority		5,600	38.55	+4.63
Turnout		14,526	86.26	+4.07
Registered electors		16,839		

=== 1966 election ===
1966 general election: Avon
Party	Candidate	Votes	%	±%
Labour	John Mathison	9,069	58.80	−2.81
National	Dick Dawson	3,837	24.88	
Social Credit	Peter Barrow	2,515	16.30	
Majority		5,232	33.92	−0.74
Turnout		15,421	82.19	−3.42
Registered electors		18,761		

=== 1963 election ===
1963 general election: Avon
Party	Candidate	Votes	%	±%
Labour	John Mathison	9,095	61.61	+4.67
National	Stan Dodwell	3,978	26.94	
Social Credit	Henry Parker	1,544	10.45	
Communist	Ralph Blackcock	145	0.98	
Majority		5,117	34.66	−7.02
Turnout		14,762	85.61	−1.97
Registered electors		17,242		

=== 1960 election ===
1960 general election: Avon
Party	Candidate	Votes	%	±%
Labour	John Mathison	8,683	56.94	−10.55
National	Lorrie Pickering	4,467	29.29	
Social Credit	George Maxwell Edmonds	1,973	12.93	
Communist	Frank McNulty	126	0.82	
Majority		4,216	27.64	−14.61
Turnout		15,249	87.58	−4.08
Registered electors		17,411		

=== 1957 election ===
1957 general election: Avon
Party	Candidate	Votes	%	±%
Labour	John Mathison	9,743	67.49	+9.17
National	William Ernest Olds	3,643	25.23	
Social Credit	Charles E. Cullen	1,049	7.26	
Majority		6,100	42.25	+5.76
Turnout		14,435	91.66	+1.61
Registered electors		15,748		

=== 1954 election ===
1954 general election: Avon
Party	Candidate	Votes	%	±%
Labour	John Mathison	7,919	58.32	−5.02
National	Arthur Norman Stone	2,964	21.83	
Social Credit	Frederick William Stevens	2,694	19.84	
Majority		4,955	36.49	+9.82
Turnout		13,577	90.05	−1.87
Registered electors		15,076		

=== 1951 election ===
1951 general election: Avon
Party	Candidate	Votes	%	±%
Labour	John Mathison	10,001	63.34	−1.80
National	Douglas Warren Russell	5,789	36.66	
Majority		4,212	26.67	−3.62
Turnout		15,790	88.18	−3.44
Registered electors		17,906		

=== 1949 election ===
1949 general election: Avon
Party	Candidate	Votes	%	±%
Labour	John Mathison	9,877	65.14	−0.17
National	George Nelson Kinzett	5,284	34.85	
Majority		4,593	30.29	−1.09
Turnout		15,161	91.62	+7.19
Registered electors		16,547		

=== 1947 by-election ===
1947 Avon by-election
Party	Candidate	Votes	%	±%
Labour	John Mathison	8,513	65.31	
National	Robert Alexander McDowell	4,422	33.92	+2.56
Independent	John Ramby Robertson	100	0.77	
Majority		4,091	31.38	−5.89
Turnout		13,035	84.43	−9.31
Labour hold		Swing	−3.33	

Robertson was a member of the Democratic Labour Party (DLP) but his nomination was refused endorsement by DLP leader John A. Lee.

=== 1946 election ===
1946 general election: Avon
Party	Candidate	Votes	%	±%
Labour	Dan Sullivan	9,539	68.64	+7.44
National	Robert Alexander McDowell	4,359	31.36	
Majority		5,180	37.27	+5.83
Turnout		13,898	92.74	+2.11
Registered electors		15,092		

=== 1943 election ===
1943 general election: Avon
Party	Candidate	Votes	%	±%
Labour	Dan Sullivan	8,682	61.20	
National	Jim Clarke	4,222	29.76	
Democratic Labour	David John Upton	1,085	7.64	
Informal votes		196	1.38	
Majority		4,460	31.44	
Turnout		14,185	90.63	
Registered electors		15,650		

=== 1935 election ===
1935 general election: Avon
Party	Candidate	Votes	%	±%
Labour	Dan Sullivan	8,955	71.11	+7.65
Independent	Lancelot Charles Walker	3,545	28.15	
Informal votes		93	0.73	+0.46
Majority		5,410	57.76	
Turnout		12,593		

=== 1931 election ===
1931 general election: Avon
Party	Candidate	Votes	%	±%
Labour	Dan Sullivan	7,166	63.46	+7.00
United	Harben Robert Young	4,127	36.54	
Majority		3,039	26.91	−7.13
Informal votes		31	0.27	−0.92
Turnout		11,324	84.82	−3.42
Registered electors		13,350		

=== 1928 election ===
1928 general election: Avon
Party	Candidate	Votes	%	±%
Labour	Dan Sullivan	6,376	56.45	−1.70
United	George Thomas Baker	2,531	22.41	
Reform	Frederick Boulton Hughes	2,387	21.14	
Majority		3,845	34.04	+17.73
Informal votes		136	1.19	+0.22
Turnout		11,430	88.24	−3.35
Registered electors		12,953		

=== 1925 election ===
1925 general election: Avon
Party	Candidate	Votes	%	±%
Labour	Dan Sullivan	6,377	58.16	+13.65
Reform	Walter Edmund Leadley	4,588	41.84	
Majority		1,789	16.32	−3.99
Informal votes		107	0.97	−0.24
Turnout		11,072	91.59	−0.17
Registered electors		12,088		

=== 1922 election ===
1922 general election: Avon
Party	Candidate	Votes	%	±%
Labour	Dan Sullivan	4,462	44.50	−13.52
Liberal	George Russell	2,426	24.20	−15.33
Reform	Albert Edward Loach	1,731	17.27	
Independent	Ann Elizabeth Herbert	1,407	14.03	
Majority		2,036	20.31	+1.80
Informal votes		122	1.20	−1.05
Turnout		10,148	91.76	+9.95
Registered electors		11,059		

=== 1919 election ===
1919 general election: Avon
Party	Candidate	Votes	%	±%
Labour	Dan Sullivan	5,168	58.03	+27.70
Liberal	George Russell	3,520	39.52	−3.46
Reform	John Louis "Jack" Carl	218	2.45	
Majority		1,648	18.50	+5.84
Informal votes		205	2.25	+1.64
Turnout		9,111	81.81	−6.31
Registered electors		11,137		

=== 1914 election ===
1914 general election: Avon
Party	Candidate	Votes	%	±%
Liberal	George Russell	3,642	42.99	−8.83
Social Democrat	Dan Sullivan	2,569	30.32	
Reform	Henry Acland	2,261	26.69	
Majority		1,073	12.67	+9.02
Informal votes		52	0.61	+0.42
Turnout		8,524	88.12	+3.30
Registered electors		9,673		

=== 1911 election ===
Avon general election, 1911, first ballot
Party	Candidate	Votes	%	±%
Liberal	George Russell	3,040	39.39	+6.12
Independent Labour	James McCombs	2,817	36.50	
Conservative	John Owen Jameson	1,062	13.76	
Labour	William Robert Smith	798	10.34	+7.01
Majority		223	2.89	+2.54
Informal votes		66	0.85	
Registered electors		8,784		
Turnout		7,783	88.60	+9.07

Avon general election, 1911, second ballot
Party	Candidate	Votes	%	±%
Liberal	George Russell	3,854	51.82	−0.20
Labour	James McCombs	3,583	48.18	
Majority		271	3.64	−4.59
Informal votes		14	0.19	
Turnout		7,451	84.82	+8.63
Registered electors		8,784		

=== 1908 election ===
1908 general election: Avon, first ballot
Party	Candidate	Votes	%	±%
Liberal	George Russell	2,185	33.27	
Liberal–Labour	William Tanner	2,162	32.92	
Conservative	John Jamieson	1,322	20.13	
Ind. Labour League	Dan Sullivan	679	10.34	
Liberal	William Robert Smith	219	3.33	
Majority		23	0.35	
Turnout		6,567	79.53	
Registered electors		8,257		

1908 general election: Avon, second ballot
Party	Candidate	Votes	%	±%
Liberal	George Russell	3,416	52.02	
Liberal–Labour	William Tanner	2,875	43.78	
Majority		541	8.24	
Turnout		6,291	76.19	
Registered electors		8,257		

=== 1899 election ===
1899 general election: Avon
Party	Candidate	Votes	%	±%
Liberal–Labour	William Tanner	2,074	51.85	+0.76
Conservative	Arthur Rhodes	1,926	48.15	
Majority		148	3.70	−11.34
Turnout		4,000	81.75	+10.92
Registered electors		4,893		

=== 1896 election ===
1896 general election: Avon
Party	Candidate	Votes	%	±%
Liberal–Labour	William Tanner	1,552	51.09	−2.80
Conservative	George McIntyre	1,095	36.04	+2.63
Conservative	George Swann	307	10.11	
Independent	Charles Burgess	84	2.76	
Majority		457	15.04	−5.43
Turnout		3,038	70.83	
Registered electors		4,289		

=== 1893 election ===
1893 general election: Avon
Party	Candidate	Votes	%	±%
Liberal–Labour	William Tanner	1,719	53.89	
Independent	George McIntyre	1,066	33.42	
Conservative	John Leaf Wilson	405	12.70	
Majority		653	20.47	+6.81
Turnout		3,190	73.83	+19.13
Registered electors		4,321		

=== 1890 election ===
1890 general election: Avon
Party	Candidate	Votes	%	±%
Liberal	Edwin Blake	774	59.44	
Conservative	George Stead	588	45.16	
Majority		186	14.28	
Turnout		1,302	54.70	
Registered electors		2,380		

=== 1866 election ===
1866 general election: Avon
Party	Candidate	Votes	%	±%
Independent	Crosbie Ward	265	58.76	
Independent	Charles Wellington Bishop	186	41.24	
Majority		79	17.52	
Turnout		451		
Registered electors				
