= Mary Batchelor =

New Zealand politician (1927–2009)

Mary Batchelor QSO

Member of the New Zealand Parliament for Avon
- In office 25 November 1972 – 15 August 1987
- Preceded by: John Mathison
- Succeeded by: Larry Sutherland

Christchurch City Councillor
- In office 12 October 1971 – 8 October 1977
- Ward: At-large (1971–74); Pegasus (1974–77)
- Succeeded by: David Close

Personal details
- Born: Mary Dorothy Foley; 7 January 1927 Christchurch, New Zealand
- Died: 12 March 2009 (aged 82) Christchurch, New Zealand
- Party: Labour
- Spouse: Arthur Batchelor
- Children: 2

Mary Dorothy Batchelor QSO (née Foley, 7 January 1927 – 12 March 2009) was a New Zealand trade unionist, feminist and Labour Party politician.

== Biography ==
=== Early life and career ===
Batchelor was born in Christchurch in 1927, the elder of two daughters, to parents from the West Coast. She attended St Mary's College until she left at 13 to begin work. She began training as a hat maker, but depreciating eyesight forced her to leave the trade. She married young to Arthur Batchelor and had two children. When her children reached school age, she returned to work. Initially she worked in retail later as a sewing machine demonstrator and then manager of a grocery store. After divorcing her husband, her subsequent experiences as a solo working mother strengthened her motivation to further women's rights and employment opportunities which led her to become active politically.

In 1964 she became an organiser for the 5000 member strong Canterbury Clerical Workers' Union. She was later elected both president of the Canterbury branch of the Council for Equal Pay and Opportunity and appointed a delegate to the Canterbury Trades Council and the National Council of Women.

=== Political career ===
New Zealand Parliament
Years	Term	Electorate	Party
1972–1975	38th	Avon	Labour
1975–1978	39th	Avon	Labour
1978–1981	40th	Avon	Labour
1981–1984	41st	Avon	Labour
1984–1987	42nd	Avon	Labour

In the 1960s she was living in St Albans and was an officeholder in the local branch of the Labour Party and was a member of its electorate committee. She worked as a campaign manager for Roger Drayton, Labour's successful St Albans candidate in 1969.

Batchelor was then elected a member of the Christchurch City Council in 1971. She was appointed chairperson of the council's health and general committee in her first term. She was re-elected three years later but in 1977 decided not to seek another term. She also served as Member of Parliament for the Avon electorate in Christchurch for 15 years from 1972 to 1987. She was New Zealand's twelfth female MP. During the Third Labour Government she clashed with socially conservative Prime Minister Norman Kirk over abortion and homosexual law reform, both of which he opposed. She became known as a champion of the underdog, but later said she did not push feminist issues too strongly to avoid alienating others. "She advocated firmly for equality of women in work, and for women generally, without being anti-male".

After Labour was surprisingly defeated in 1975 Batchelor was designated as Labour's spokesperson on women's affairs by leader Bill Rowling. Despite clashing with National Prime Minister Robert Muldoon in the house several times, the two got on well with each other. She notably became a victim of Muldoon's routine name-calling. He referred to her as "orange roughy" after she dyed her hair a startling shade of red, one of the few times she achieved any semblance of prominence in her parliamentary career. In March 1983 she was appointed as Labour's spokesperson for Urban Affairs by Labour leader David Lange. On 5 April 1983 she collapsed while attending a function at the Christchurch Town Hall. She was taken to hospital and had several tests before being discharged to her home. Batchelor later stated that she was overcome by exhaustion following a strenuous travel schedule.

Dissatisfaction with her low-profile performance in Parliament was beginning to show by the 1980s. In the lead up to the 1984 election she narrowly survived an electorate committee vote of no confidence and a challenge from local union leader Paul Piesse and automotive surveyor David John Penny for the Labour Party nomination in Avon. The battle went to a second vote before Batchelor finally emerged victorious. She was re-elected that year, which saw the formation of the Fourth Labour Government. Despite having served in Parliament since 1972, and therefore one of Labour's most experienced MPs, she was overlooked for a place in Cabinet after the government was formed. The challenge against her for the nomination, combined with her Cabinet snub lead her to announce her retirement at the 1987 election.

=== Later life and death ===
After Parliament, Batchelor purchased a second house on Australia's Gold Coast, so that she could avoid the Christchurch winters and be near her daughter and granddaughter. She took up painting and was a member of the Royal Queensland Art Society.

Batchelor died on 12 March 2009 aged 82.

== Honours and awards ==
In the 1987 Queen's Birthday Honours, Batchelor was appointed a Companion of the Queen's Service Order for public services. She was awarded the Queen Elizabeth II Silver Jubilee Medal in 1977, the New Zealand 1990 Commemoration Medal, and, in 1993, the New Zealand Suffrage Centennial Medal.

New Zealand Parliament
Preceded by John Mathison	Member of Parliament for Avon; 1972–1987	Succeeded by Larry Sutherland
