= John Mathison =

New Zealand politician (1901–1982)

The Honourable John Mathison OBE JP
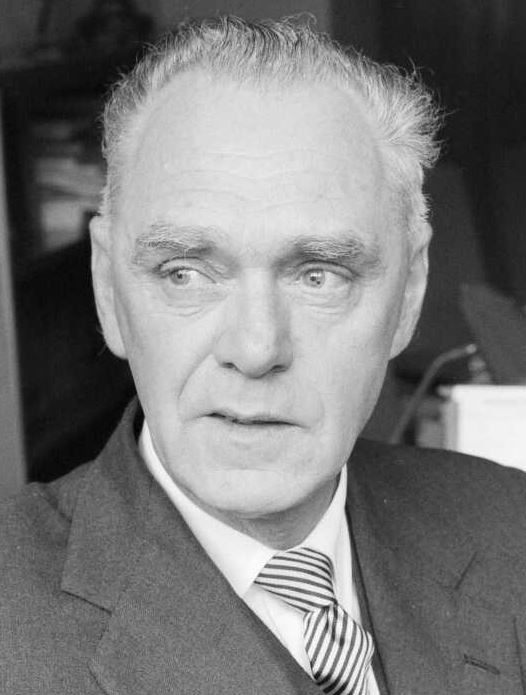
- Mathison in 1959

8th Minister of Transport
- In office 12 December 1957 – 12 December 1960
- Prime Minister: Walter Nash
- Preceded by: Stan Goosman
- Succeeded by: John McAlpine

14th Minister of Island Territories
- In office 12 December 1957 – 12 December 1960
- Prime Minister: Walter Nash
- Preceded by: Tom Macdonald
- Succeeded by: Leon Götz

15th Minister of Tourism
- In office 12 December 1957 – 12 December 1960
- Prime Minister: Walter Nash
- Preceded by: Dean Eyre
- Succeeded by: Tom Shand

Member of the New Zealand Parliament for Avon
- In office 28 May 1947 – 25 November 1972
- Preceded by: Dan Sullivan
- Succeeded by: Mary Batchelor

Personal details
- Born: 29 September 1901 Peebles, Scotland
- Died: 12 October 1982 (aged 81) Christchurch, New Zealand
- Party: Labour
- Spouse: Agnes Anderson
- Profession: Wool spinner

John Mathison OBE JP (29 September 1901 – 12 October 1982) was a New Zealand politician of the Labour Party. He was famed for his skills as a chairman and well known for his "unmistakably Scottish" accent, eloquent speeches and dry sense of humour.

== Biography ==
=== Early life and career ===
He was born in Peebles, Scotland, in 1901. He worked as a shop steward for a wool mill where he first became involved in trade unionism, joining the National Union of General Workers. After being laid off from his job he emigrated to New Zealand in 1921. Shortly after arriving he married Agnes Anderson, a fellow Scottish emigrant whom he had met on the voyage.

He then found employment as a woollen worker (spinner) at the Kaiapoi woolen mills. A short while later he briefly worked as an industrial insurance salesman before joining the Christchurch Tramways Board as a conductor in 1924, later becoming a tram driver. He became the president of the Tramway Workers' Union from 1928 to 1932. During his tenure as president there was a 10-day strike in 1932. The strike was protesting 12 layoffs (including Mathison himself) when the Christchurch Tramway Board looked to cut expenditure in the face of financial problems from falling ticket revenue. At the meeting where the union voted to strike Mathison cautioned against it stating that if a strike was to occur Christchurch "will be plunged into the first installment of an industrial war". The strike had spells of violence between the unemployed and police proving his prediction true. The strike ultimately ended in failure and a total of 60 men were not reinstated.

During the strike Mathison left the tramways and accepted employment, to much criticism, at the Christchurch Star-Sun newspaper where he worked as a publisher for many years. He resigned from his role there upon his election to Parliament. Mathison was also the chairman of the Christchurch Unemployed Workers' Union.

=== Local politics ===
Mathison joined the Labour Party two weeks after arriving in New Zealand. He was a member of the Christchurch City Council from 1933 to 1958 when he resigned upon being elected a cabinet minister. His brother, William Houston Mathison, was elected a member of the city council from 1965 to 1968.

He stood as the Labour Party's candidate for Mayor of Christchurch in the 1968 election, but was beaten by councillor Ron Guthrey.

In 1933 he became a member of the Christchurch Transport Board and was a member, over separate spells, for decades. During his first term as a member of the board he fulfilled a commitment to re-employ all the workers who were dismissed as a result of the 1932 strike. As vacancies arose on the tramways the positions were offered to former employees and by 1935 all those who desired it were once again employed there. Following the 1980 local elections he was appointed chairman. He was still chairman at the time of his death.

=== Member of Parliament ===
New Zealand Parliament
| Years | Term | Electorate | Party |
|---|---|---|---|
| 1947–1949 | 28th | Avon | Labour |
| 1949–1951 | 29th | Avon | Labour |
| 1951–1954 | 30th | Avon | Labour |
| 1954–1957 | 31st | Avon | Labour |
| 1957–1960 | 32nd | Avon | Labour |
| 1960–1963 | 33rd | Avon | Labour |
| 1963–1966 | 34th | Avon | Labour |
| 1966–1969 | 35th | Avon | Labour |
| 1969–1972 | 36th | Avon | Labour |

He unsuccessfully stood for the Hurunui electorate in 1946. He represented the Christchurch electorate of Avon from a by-election in 1947 to 1972, when he retired. He became the chairman of the caucus transport committee and from 1952 until 1958 he was the Labour Party's junior whip. For many years he was Parliament billiards champion, leading him to later become patron of first the Canterbury Billiards Association and later the New Zealand Billiards Council.

In 1953, Mathison was awarded the Queen Elizabeth II Coronation Medal.

At the 1957 Labour Party annual conference, Mathison challenged Mick Moohan for the party presidency, but was defeated in the delegate ballot. He also stood for the vice-presidency but was likewise unsuccessful losing to the incumbent, Martyn Finlay.

He was a cabinet minister from 1957 to 1960 in the Second Labour Government. Mathison served as Minister of Transport, Minister of Island Territories, Minister of Tourism and Minister of Civil Aviation.

As Minister of Island Territories he did the preliminary work which lead to the independence of Western Samoa as well as establishing self-government in the Cook Islands. As Minister of Civil Aviation he was responsible for the arrangement that safeguarded New Zealand's interests in Tasman Empire Airways.

When in opposition, Mathison was Shadow Minister of Transport, Marine, Railways and Tourism under Norman Kirk who had a fond respect for him, despite Mathison voting for Arnold Nordmeyer in the 1965 leadership challenge. Mathison considered Kirk the most democratic leader Labour had ever had and appreciated how he let caucus members openly "say their piece" in ways never allowed under Fraser, Nash or Nordmeyer, and he regretted that the newer (and future) Labour MPs would be unable to make this comparison. Kirk had wanted Mathison to remain in Parliament in order to appoint him Speaker of the House following a Labour victory, thinking that he would be 'firm but fair' to assist an inevitably inexperienced Labour government. However Kirk was unable to convince the party executive to overlook the statutory retirement age of 70 which necessitated Mathison's retirement.

=== Later life and death ===
Mathison was appointed an Officer of the Order of the British Empire in the 1973 New Year Honours, for services to politics.

After retiring from politics he was a board member of the New Zealand Ports Authority for three years. He also became a trustee of the Canterbury Savings Bank and was president of the board for two years.

He died in Christchurch on 12 October 1982, aged 81. He was survived by a son and daughter.

== Notes ==
Political offices
| Preceded by Stan Goosman | Minister of Transport; 1957–1960 | Succeeded by John McAlpine |
| Preceded by Tom Shand | Minister of Civil Aviation; 1957–1960 | Succeeded by John McAlpine |
| Preceded by Dean Eyre | Minister of Tourism; 1957–1960 | Succeeded by Tom Shand |
| Preceded by Tom Macdonald | Minister of Island Territories; 1957–1960 | Succeeded by Leon Götz |
New Zealand Parliament
| Preceded by Dan Sullivan | Member of Parliament for Avon; 1947–1972 | Succeeded by Mary Batchelor |
