= William Thomson (politician) =

Scottish-born New Zealand politician (1818–1866)

- Born: 1818; Edinburgh, Scotland
- Died: 2 April 1866 aged 48
- Occupations: Auctioneer; Accountant; Commission agent
- Known for: Political life in New Zealand
- Relatives: Arthur Ollivier (son-in-law)

William Thomson (1818 – 20 April 1866) was a 19th-century politician from Christchurch, New Zealand, originally from Scotland. He held office at all levels of government, from Parliament and Provincial Council to chairman of a road board. In his professional life, Thomson was an auctioneer, accountant and commission agent. He had rural holdings in Governors Bay and at the Esk River.

== Early life ==
Thomson was born in Edinburgh in 1818; his father was a printer. He worked as an accountant in Glasgow. He married Georgina Scott, a daughter of a Glasgow merchant. They had four boys and four girls; some of these were born in New Zealand.

== Life in New Zealand ==
Thomson and his family came to Christchurch on the Hampshire, arriving in Lyttelton in 1853. He bought a property at Governors Bay that he called 'Hemingford', from where he ran a dairy farm and supplied Lyttelton with firewood. These pursuits not proving sufficiently lucrative, he sold his property to William Sefton Moorhouse. It later changed ownership to Thomas Potts and became known as Ohinetahi; the building is these days a Category I heritage listing registered by Heritage New Zealand.

Thomson bought a 50-acre (0.20 km^{2}) section in Papanui and called this property Scotstown, Scottstoun or Scottstown. The name still exists today as a street name, although it is corrupted to Scotston Avenue (with the area now regarded as belonging to the suburb of St Albans).

Thomson worked as an auctioneer, accountant and commission agent. He set up the first auction mart in the city. He was a shareholder in the Canterbury Standard, a Christchurch newspaper that was published from June 1854 until 1866 by Joseph Brittan. From the late 1850s until 1861, he owned Lochinvar Station in North Canterbury, on the Esk River, which he stocked with cattle. Thomson took a very active part in forming the Canterbury Agricultural and Pastoral Association. He was also a member of the Canterbury Jockey Club, and one of the promoters of the old stone grand stand.

== Political career ==
New Zealand Parliament
| Years | Term | Electorate | Party |
|---|---|---|---|
| 1862–1866 | 3rd | Avon | Independent |

Thomson was on the Canterbury Provincial Council from 1855 until 1861, representing the interests of pastoralists. He initially opposed William Sefton Moorhouse on the tunnel proposal, but by 1861 had changed his mind, when he was presiding at a dinner to celebrate Moorhouse's successful engagement of the Australian contractors Holmes & Richardson. Alfred Richard Creyke stood in the 1861 general election (held on 1 February) in the Avon electorate for Parliament, whilst William Thomson stood in the same electorate for the Canterbury Provincial Council. Thomson proposed Creyke and vice versa; both were elected unopposed.

In the September 1861 election to the Provincial Council, Thomson was the highest polling candidate. Other successful candidates were Thomas Smith Duncan, Charles Bowen and Edward Templer; John Shand and Alfred Richard Creyke (who at the time was still representing the Avon electorate in Parliament) were unsuccessful. Thomson was elected as Provincial Auditor on 25 October 1861, proposed by John Ollivier but opposed by James FitzGerald. He was succeeded in this role upon his death by John Ollivier. When road boards, the predecessors of district councils, were first established, Thomson became the chairman of the Avon Road Board.

Thomson represented the Avon electorate from an 1862 by-election, following the resignation of Alfred Richard Creyke, until the end of the term in 1866, when he retired. He was succeeded by Crosbie Ward in the 1866 election, which was held on 20 February in the Avon electorate.

Thomson had a loud voice and could be intimidating. Crosbie Ward wrote about him:

First rose burly Scotie – Thomson

he the portly, big and bulky,
round proportioned, talking loudly,

making little men to tremble.

William Ellison Burke, in his Burke Manuscript, wrote about Thomson that he was "portly in presence and strong in voice, could both be seen and heard."

== Death ==
Thomson was a Captain with the Canterbury Yeomanry Cavalry. He died on 20 April 1866 at his home Scotstown, aged 48. He was buried at Papanui Cemetery four days later with military honours. Other Captains of the Yeomanry Cavalry were pallbearers, including Crosbie Ward, William Sefton Moorhouse and John Cracroft Wilson.

Debt incurred through the Canterbury Standard forced the surviving family members to sell Scotstown. His wife Georgiana survived him by many years and died in January 1894. In 1876, his daughter Florence Agnes May (Agnes) married Arthur Ollivier, the son of John Ollivier.

== Notes ==
New Zealand Parliament
| Preceded by Alfred Richard Creyke | Member of Parliament for Avon; 1862–1866 | Succeeded by Crosbie Ward |
