= Ilam, New Zealand =

Suburb of Christchurch, New Zealand

Ilam
- Suburb
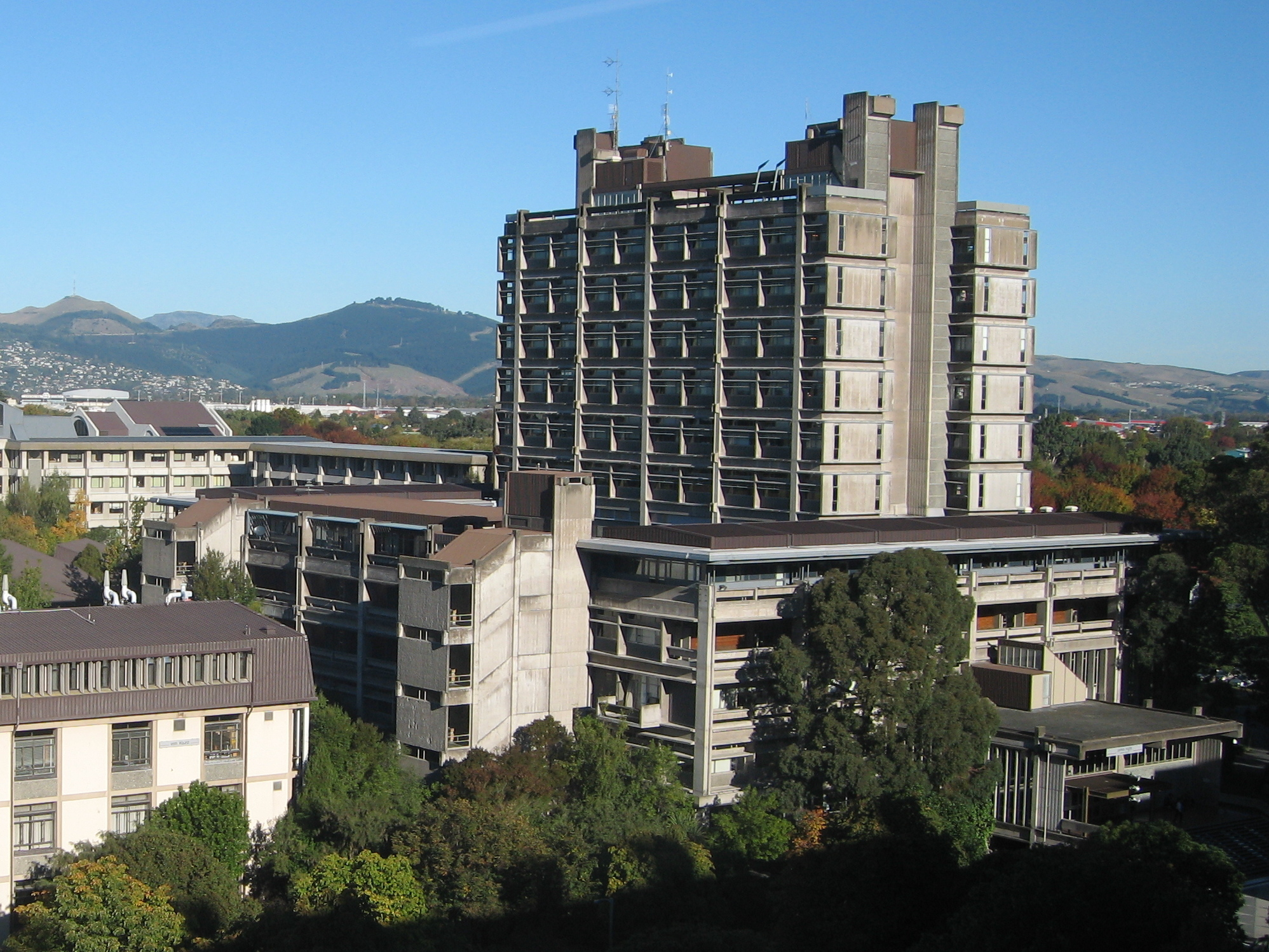
- Puaka-James Hight, home to the University of Canterbury Central Library and centrepiece of the University's Ilam campus.
- Interactive map of Ilam
- Coordinates: 43.526111°S 172.580278°E
- Country: New Zealand
- City: Christchurch
- Local authority: Christchurch City Council
- Electoral ward: Waimairi; Riccarton
- Community board: Waimāero Fendalton-Waimairi-Harewood; Waipuna Halswell-Hornby-Riccarton

Area
  - Land: 337 ha (830 acres)

Population (June 2025)
  - Total: 10,730
  - Density: 3,180/km^{2} (8,250/sq mi)

	Burnside	Bryndwr
Avonhead	Ilam	Fendalton
	Upper Riccarton	Riccarton

Ilam (/ˈaɪləm/) is a suburb of Christchurch, New Zealand, about five kilometres west of the city centre. It is the location of the University of Canterbury.

Located adjacent to State Highway 1 and Christchurch Airport, it is handily placed for transportation. It is also located close to the major retail area of Riccarton.

== History ==
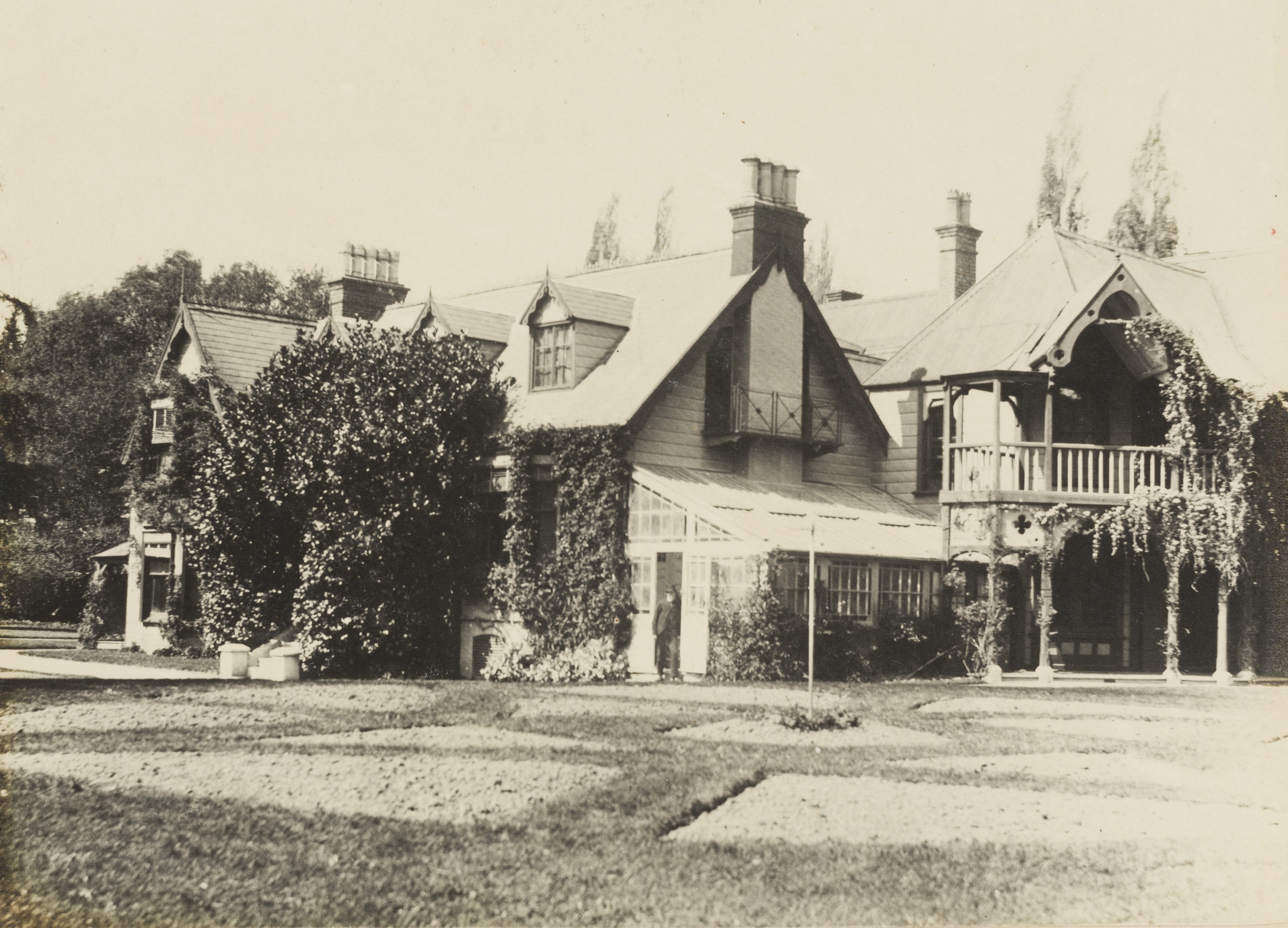
Ilam, home of the John Watts-Russell, Christchurch, New Zealand

The suburb was named after the ancestral home of the Hon. John Watts-Russell (1825–75), who hailed from Ilam Hall in Staffordshire, England. He settled in Canterbury in 1850, arriving on Sir George Seymour and named his property Ilam.

The Ilam homestead was in the 1950s inhabited by the rector of Canterbury College, Henry Rainsford Hulme. In 1954 the homestead gained notoriety as Hulme's 16-year-old daughter Juliet was involved in the Parker–Hulme murder case. The homestead was used as a major location for Peter Jackson's film about the murders, Heavenly Creatures. The homestead has been the University of Canterbury Staff Club since 1971.

== Demographics ==
Ilam, comprising the statistical areas of Ilam North, Ilam South and Ilam University, covers 3.37 km^{2} (1.30 sq mi). It had an estimated population of 10,730 as of June 2025, with a population density of 3,184 people per km^{2}.

Historical population
Year	Pop.	±% p.a.
2006	8,532	—
2013	9,000	+0.77%
2018	9,357	+0.78%
2023	10,218	+1.78%

Ilam had a population of 10,218 in the 2023 New Zealand census, an increase of 861 people (9.2%) since the 2018 census, and an increase of 1,218 people (13.5%) since the 2013 census. There were 5,142 males, 5,004 females, and 69 people of other genders in 2,727 dwellings. 7.0% of people identified as LGBTIQ+. There were 1,017 people (10.0%) aged under 15 years, 5,289 (51.8%) aged 15 to 29, 2,862 (28.0%) aged 30 to 64, and 1,056 (10.3%) aged 65 or older.

People could identify as more than one ethnicity. The results were 69.1% European (Pākehā); 6.8% Māori; 3.5% Pasifika; 27.4% Asian; 1.9% Middle Eastern, Latin American and African New Zealanders (MELAA); and 1.5% other, which includes people giving their ethnicity as "New Zealander". English was spoken by 95.0%, Māori by 1.3%, Samoan by 0.8%, and other languages by 25.6%. No language could be spoken by 1.1% (e.g. too young to talk). New Zealand Sign Language was known by 0.5%. The percentage of people born overseas was 35.9, compared with 28.8% nationally.

Religious affiliations were 29.5% Christian, 1.9% Hindu, 1.8% Islam, 0.1% Māori religious beliefs, 1.8% Buddhist, 0.2% New Age, 0.2% Jewish, and 2.3% other religions. People who answered that they had no religion were 57.3%, and 5.0% of people did not answer the census question.

Of those at least 15 years old, 2,547 (27.7%) people had a bachelor's or higher degree, 5,406 (58.8%) had a post-high school certificate or diploma, and 1,254 (13.6%) people exclusively held high school qualifications. 621 people (6.7%) earned over $100,000 compared to 12.1% nationally. The employment status of those at least 15 was 2,988 (32.5%) full-time, 1,920 (20.9%) part-time, and 420 (4.6%) unemployed.

Individual statistical areas
Name	Area (km^{2})	Population	Density (per km^{2})	Dwellings	Median age	Median income
Ilam North	1.23	3,951	3,212	1,257	27.3 years	$27,700
Ilam South	0.91	3,270	3,593	1,068	28.8 years	$28,100
Ilam University	1.23	2,997	2,437	402	19.3 years	$10,200
New Zealand					38.1 years	$41,500

== Education ==
Ilam Primary School, located on Ilam Road, is a coeducational contributing primary school (years 1–6) situated next to the University of Canterbury whose facilities the school uses. The school educates many children from overseas. It has a roll of 359. It opened in 1950.

Westburn Te Kura o Hereora is a state coeducational full primary school (years 1–8) with a roll of 431. The school was founded in 1962.

Medbury School is a private full primary boys' school (years 1–8) with a roll of 371. It was established in 1923.

Rolls are as of March 2026.

The Canterbury Japanese Supplementary School (カンタベリー日本語補習校 Kantaberī Nihongo Hoshūkō), a weekend Japanese school, holds its classes at the Ilam School in Ilam.
