= 1867 Avon by-election =

New Zealand by-election

The 1867 Avon by-election was a by-election held on 11 March 1867 during the 4th New Zealand Parliament in the Christchurch electorate of Avon.

The by-election was caused by the resignation of the incumbent MP Crosbie Ward.

The by-election was won by William Reeves, the business partner of Ward. As there were no other candidates, he was declared elected unopposed.

Ward died in November 1867 and in May 1868, Reeves resigned as he was unable to stay away from his business for the upcoming 1868 parliamentary session in Wellington. This triggered the 1868 Avon by-election.
