= Tom Macdonald (politician) =

New Zealand politician (1898–1980)

Sir Tom Macdonald KCMG
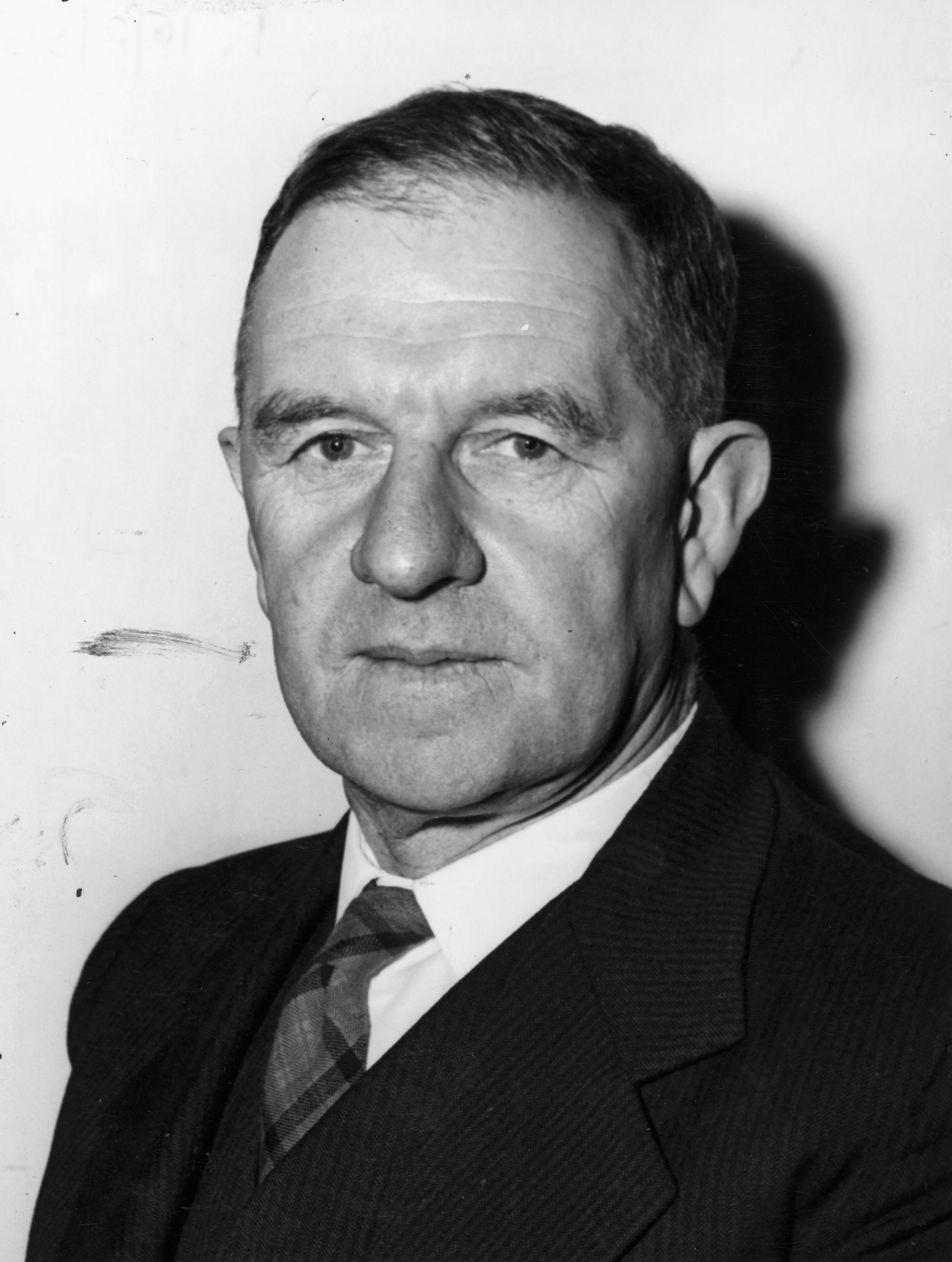
- Thomas Macdonald in 1954

High Commissioner of New Zealand to the United Kingdom
- In office March 1961 – May 1968
- Monarch: Elizabeth II
- Preceded by: Sir Clifton Webb
- Succeeded by: Sir Denis Blundell

Minister of Defence
- In office 13 December 1949 – 26 September 1957
- Prime Minister: Sidney Holland
- Preceded by: Fred Jones
- Succeeded by: Dean Eyre

Minister of External Affairs
- In office 26 November 1954 – 12 December 1957
- Prime Minister: Sidney Holland; Keith Holyoake
- Preceded by: Clifton Webb
- Succeeded by: Walter Nash

Minister of Island Territories
- In office 26 November 1954 – 12 December 1957
- Prime Minister: Sidney Holland; Keith Holyoake
- Preceded by: Clifton Webb
- Succeeded by: John Mathison

Personal details
- Born: Thomas Lachlan Macdonald; 14 December 1898 Invercargill, New Zealand
- Died: 11 April 1980 (aged 81) Wellington, New Zealand
- Party: National Party

Military service
- Allegiance: New Zealand
- Branch/service: New Zealand Expeditionary Force
- Years of service: 1918–1919; 1940–1943
- Rank: Captain
- Battles/wars: First World War; Sinai and Palestine campaign; Second World War; North African campaign

Sir Thomas Lachlan Macdonald KCMG (14 December 1898 – 11 April 1980) was a New Zealand politician of the National Party. He served as Minister of Defence (1949–1957), Minister of External Affairs (1954–1957), and Minister of Island Territories (1955–1957), and was New Zealand High Commissioner to the United Kingdom (1961–1968).

== Early life and war service ==
Macdonald was born in Invercargill on 14 December 1898, to parents Thomas Forsaith Macdonald, a farmer, and Margaret Ann Matheson. One of his great-grandfathers, Thomas Forsaith, was a member of the 1st New Zealand Parliament. Macdonald was educated at South School and Southland Boys' High School. He served in the New Zealand Expeditionary Force in Palestine in the First World War, and in the Second World War he served in Egypt, rising to the rank of captain until he was invalided home in 1943.

== Political career ==
New Zealand Parliament
Years	Term	Electorate	Party
1938–1943	26th	Mataura	National
1943–1946	27th	Mataura	National
1946–1949	28th	Wallace	National
1949–1951	29th	Wallace	National
1951–1954	30th	Wallace	National
1954–1957	31st	Wallace	National

Macdonald was the Member of Parliament for Mataura 1938 to 1946, then Wallace 1946 to 1957, when he retired.

He was Minister of Defence (1949–1957), Minister of External Affairs (1954–1957), and Minister of Island Territories (1955–1957) in the First National Government.

From 1961 to 1968 he was the New Zealand High Commissioner to the United Kingdom. Concurrently, he was accredited as non-resident Ambassador to Ireland for his 2 last years of diplomatic services, from 1966 to 1968.

He died in 1980.

== Awards and honours ==
In 1953, Macdonald was awarded the Queen Elizabeth II Coronation Medal.

In the 1963 New Year Honours, Macdonald was appointed a Knight Commander of the Order of St Michael and St George.

Mount Macdonald in Antarctica was named for him by the New Zealand Geological Survey Antarctic Expedition (1961–62).

== Notes ==
New Zealand Parliament
Preceded by David McDougall	Member of Parliament for Mataura; 1938–1946	Constituency abolished
Preceded by Adam Hamilton	Member of Parliament for Wallace; 1946–1957	Succeeded by Brian Talboys
Diplomatic posts
Preceded by Sir Clifton Webb; Dick Campbell (acting); George Laking (acting)	High Commissioner of New Zealand to the United Kingdom; 1961–1968	Succeeded by Denis Blundell
