= John Watts-Russell =

New Zealand politician (1825–1875)

The Honourable John Charles Watts-Russell JP

New Zealand Legislative Council
- In office 1854–1855
- In office 1858–1868

Canterbury Provincial Council

Personal details
- Born: 1825 Ilam Hall, Staffordshire, England
- Died: 2 April 1875 (aged 49–50) Christchurch, New Zealand
- Resting place: St. Peter’s Anglican Church cemetery, Upper Riccarton (43.53170°S 172.56990°E)
- Spouse: Elizabeth Watts-Russell
- Children: nil
- Profession: politician, runholder

John Charles Watts-Russell JP (1825 – 2 April 1875) was a 19th-century New Zealand politician, a member of the Canterbury Provincial Council and a member of the Legislative Council. He was supposedly the wealthiest of the early settlers, and his homestead became the centre of entertainment in Christchurch. He was a significant runholder and, together with a business partner, was responsible for building up the Canterbury sheep stock.

== Early life ==
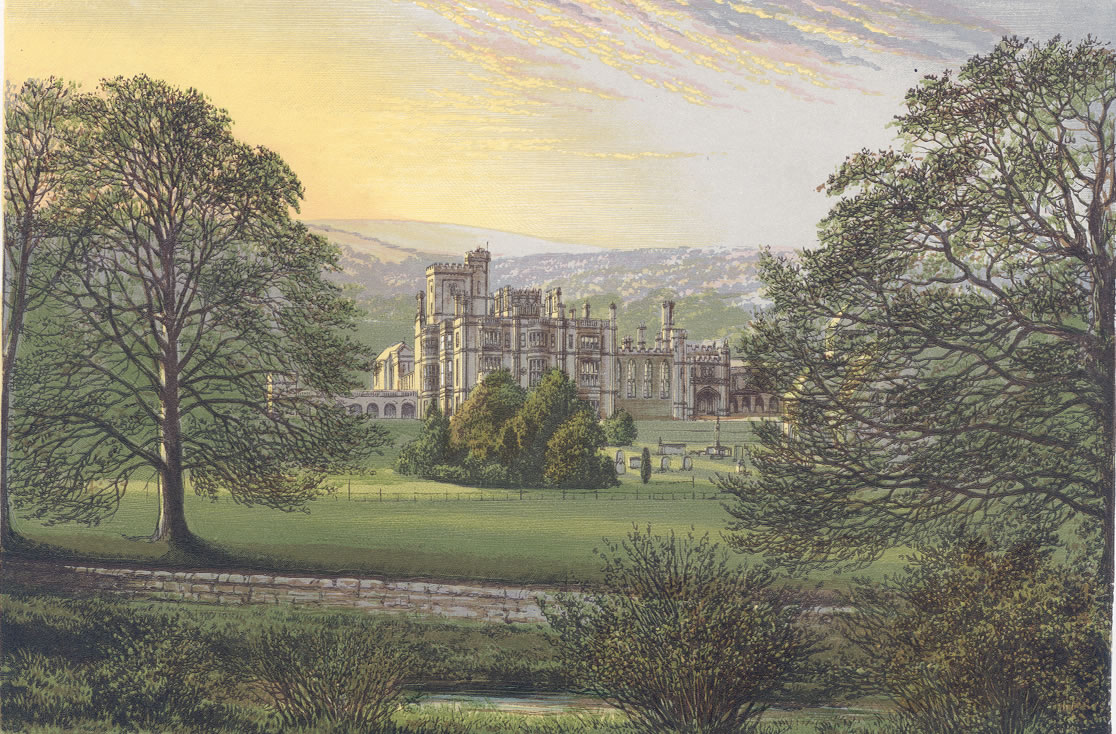
Ilam Hall circa 1880

Watts-Russell was born in Ilam Hall in Staffordshire, England in 1825, one of nine children and the youngest son of the family. His father was Jesse Watts-Russell (1786–1875), a wealthy landowner and Conservative MP for the rotten borough of Gatton, and his mother was Mary Watts. His father, who was originally called Jesse Russell, took on the new family name of Watts-Russell in March 1817. Ilam in Staffordshire was built by his father. The valley and surrounding hills reminded his father of the Alps, and consequently he had some new cottages built in a Swiss chalet style and rehoused most of the villagers. In 1857 he built a school matching in style and funded its operation, at a time when schooling was not compulsory.

Watts-Russell purchased a commission in the 17th Regiment of Light Dragoons in 1845. While he was stationed in Ireland in 1850, he married Elizabeth Rose Rebecca Bradshaw. They decided to emigrate, and this decision might have been influenced by him wanting to escape the social stigma of having married beneath his social class. He was also a chronic asthmatic and was hoping for improved health from the change in climate. This was at a time when the Canterbury Association was actively selling land in New Zealand. He sold his commission as lieutenant and purchased 500 acres (2.0 km^{2}) of land in the colony.

== Life in New Zealand ==
The couple plus some of their staff (Elizabeth's personal maid, Johanna Wornall; Sarah Hodgkinson née Mellor and her husband Charles) arrived in Lyttelton on 17 December 1850, on Sir George Seymour, one of the First Four Ships. For the first while, they lived on the ship. Returning to the ship from shore on 5 January 1851, their boat with nine passengers capsized. Elizabeth managed to hold onto a rope, but her husband, thinking that she was in trouble, attempted to rescue her. As he could not swim, he himself got into difficulty, so now Elizabeth tried to save him. They had already sunk twice before they got pulled out of the water.

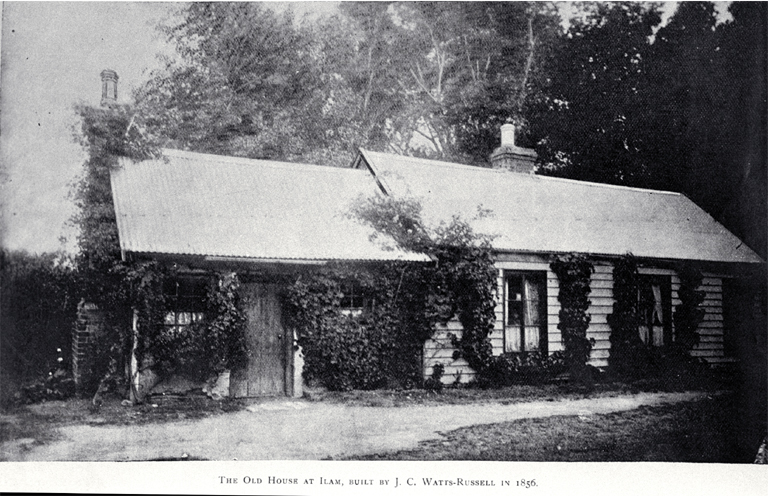
Watts-Russell's 1856 cottage (ca. 1900)

Land parcels were allocated in early 1851. The order by which the settlers could choose was determined by ballot. Watts-Russell's name came up early and he chose land adjacent to the farm established by the Deans brothers in the early 1840s at Riccarton Bush. That land parcel was bounded by what are now Riccarton, Waimairi and Clyde Roads and the Waimairi Stream. While a cob house was built for them on their land, they lived with Charlotte and John Robert Godley; Godley is considered the founder of Canterbury. He called their home Ilam after his birthplace.

The Watts-Russells were wealthy and could afford staff; they were supposedly the richest settlers from the First Four Ships. This allowed them the time to participate in social and charitable activities. His wife was known for her charm and vivacity, and their home became one of the centres of entertainment in Christchurch.

Watts-Russell took an interest in sheep and horses when most other farmers concentrated on arable farming. He and his friend and business partner, Alfred Richard Creyke, were instrumental in establishing and building up the Canterbury sheep stock. Creyke was employed by him to manage his runs.

Creyke had a large sheep run on the Canterbury Plains that he managed together with Watts-Russell on behalf of an absentee land holder. Creyke also owned some of the land. The run's homestead was located at Racecourse Hill, about halfway between Darfield and Waddington. Creyke sold the station in 1860 or 1861.

Watts-Russell bought the Dalethorpe run off the Deans brothers in 1851 and owned it until 1866. In the early years, he had this run managed by Creyke. Watts-Russell had named it Dalethorpe after a family property back in his native Staffordshire. It was located in the Malvern Hills (named after the English Malvern Hills) behind Homebush, with Dalethorpe Road leading into the area.

Whilst their sheep ventures were most beneficial to the South Island economy, another of their ventures proved disastrous, as they introduced rabbits.

James FitzGerald founded The Press, and it was conceived at Watts-Russell's homestead. FitzGerald documented the occasion in a letter dated 5 June 1861:

Sitting after dinner at Ilam about a month ago, I said I saw no hope for a better state of public policy here unless there was a new newspaper started which would tell the truth without fear or favour. In five minutes the thing was settled. If I would undertake the management of it, it was to be started and five hundred pound was put down on the spot; it was soon found there was a little press and some types to be bought. I promised I would write and would exercise a general superintendence over the matter... The first number appeared three weeks after the conversation referred to.

=== Overseas travel ===
England

In February 1856, they returned to England after having leased their house and sold all their furniture. His wife was quite sick at the time. They returned in January 1858 on the Westminster and had Elizabeth's sister, Mary Ann Bradshaw, with them. They also brought 20,000 bricks with them for a new house.

France

In 1866, Watts-Russell sold many of his properties and leased their homestead. This implies that they may not have intended to return to New Zealand. They spend much of their time away in France. They did return in 1871, though, and lived adjacent to Cathedral Square until his death.

== Ilam homestead ==
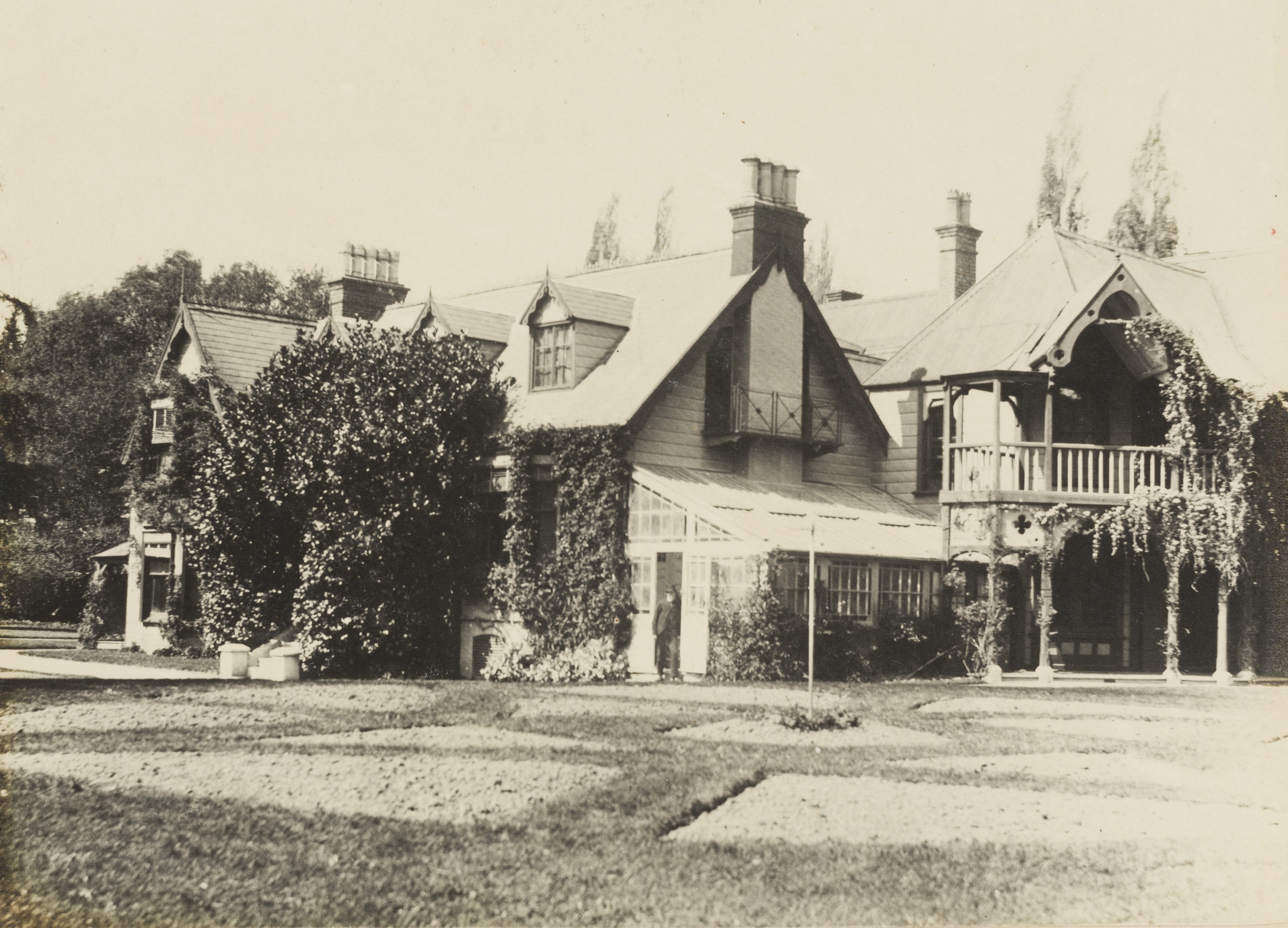
Ilam, home of John Watts-Russell, Christchurch, New Zealand, c. 1900

The bricks that they imported in 1858 were used for building the ground floor of their new Ilam homestead (43.52442°S 172.57703°E). A much larger house, it was an excellent entertainment venue; it was the largest private residence in Christchurch at the time. It was built in the style of an English mansion and had eight bedrooms, a conservatory, a drawing room and a dining room. The 10 acres (40,000 m^{2}) of garden were laid out with extensive lawns, including a croquet lawn, with the Avon River / Ōtākaro winding through.

Watts-Russell sold the homestead in 1866. It burned down on 22 August 1910, but was rebuilt by the then-owner, ornithologist Edgar Stead. The house and grounds passed to Canterbury College, now the University of Canterbury, in 1950. For many years, the house was the residence of the rector (now the vice-chancellor), and is these days used as the staff club for the university.

== Political career ==
Watts-Russell was a member of the Canterbury Provincial Council. He was appointed to the New Zealand Legislative Council in 1854 and resigned in 1855. He was again appointed by the first Stafford Ministry in 1858 and was a member for ten years.

He was the first Grand Master of the Freemasons in Canterbury.

== Death and commemoration ==
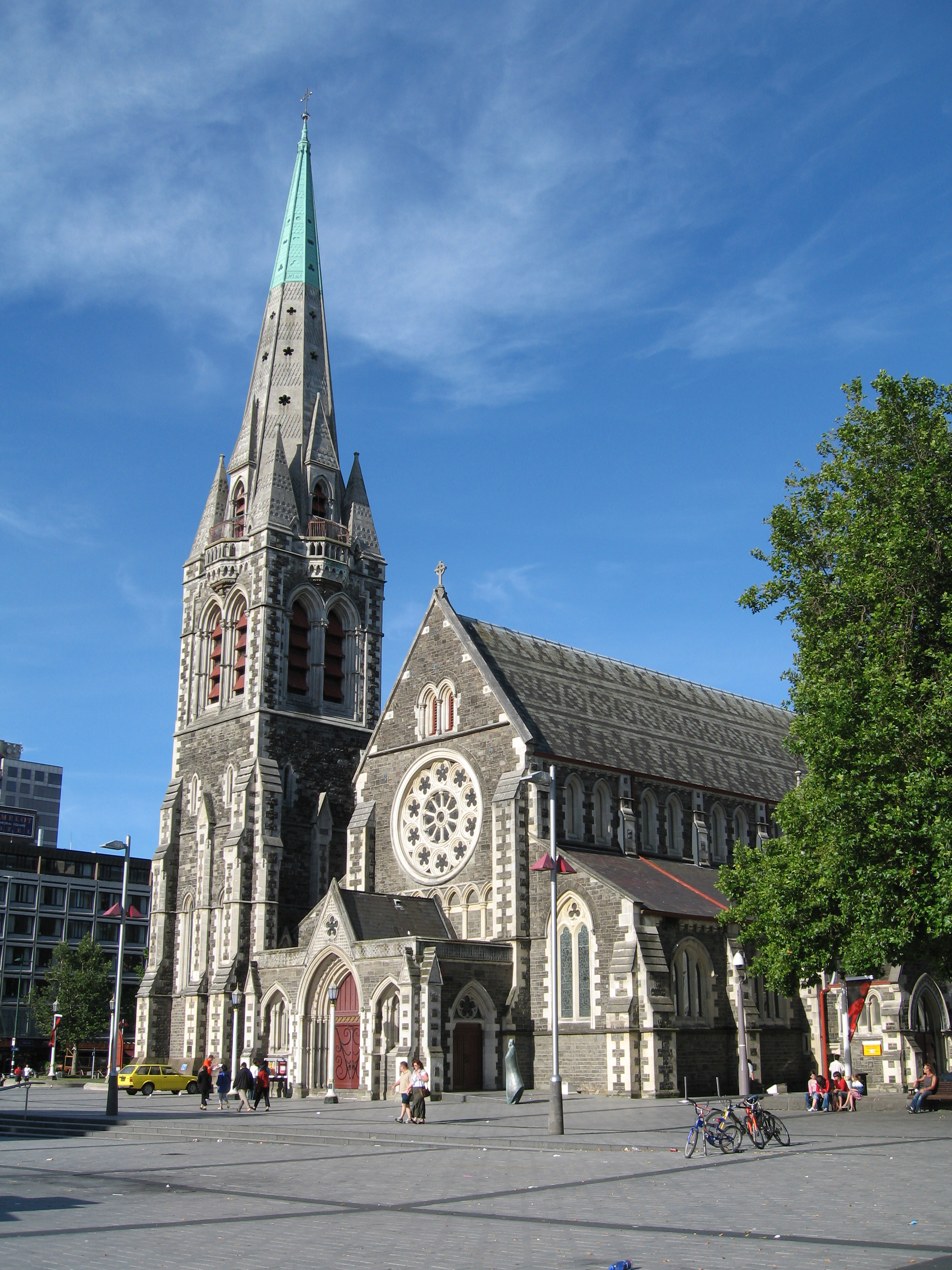
ChristChurch Cathedral in Christchurch, New Zealand

Watts-Russell died after a short and severe illness on 2 April 1875 in Christchurch. He is buried in Upper Riccarton in the churchyard of St Peter's Church, Riccarton.

His wife's sister died only four months later, and Elizabeth left for England, never to return to New Zealand. In 1877 the widow married Alfred Richard Creyke, who had worked for her first husband as a station manager. After Creyke died in 1893, she arranged for the western porch of the ChristChurch Cathedral to be built in his memory. On the south side of the cathedral's nave, there is also a Watts-Russell Memorial Window. She died on 7 October 1905 at Horsham, West Sussex.

The suburb of Ilam was named after his homestead. The name was formalised by the Waimairi County Council in 1959. Dovedale Avenue in Ilam is named after their staff member Sarah Hodgkinson's birthplace.
