= Larry Sutherland =

New Zealand politician

Member of the New Zealand Parliament for Avon
- In office 15 August 1987 – 12 October 1996
- Preceded by: Mary Batchelor
- Succeeded by: seat abolished

Member of the New Zealand Parliament for Christchurch East
- In office 12 October 1996 – 27 November 1999
- Preceded by: In abeyance
- Succeeded by: Lianne Dalziel

Personal details
- Born: 15 April 1951 Christchurch, New Zealand
- Died: 21 June 2005 (aged 54) Christchurch, New Zealand
- Party: Labour
- Spouse: Verna
- Children: 2
- Occupation: sawfiler

Larry Walter Sutherland (15 April 1951 – 21 June 2005) was a New Zealand politician, and an MP from 1987 to 1999, representing the Labour Party.

== Early life and career ==
Sutherland was born in Christchurch in 1951 and was raised in a Halswell orphanage. He attended Lincoln High School and after completing his education he worked many different jobs as a labourer, farm worker and forester. He eventually moved to Nelson where he trained as a sawfiler. There he became involved in the trade union movement, serving as a union secretary. He also became regional representative of the Wellington and Nelson Shop Employees' Union and president of the Nelson Trades Council. He was also a member of the Nelson Community Education Council, Nelson Polytechnic Council and the Nelson Public Relations and Promotion Committee.

His work in the union movement around Nelson brought him into close contact with the Labour MP for Tasman (and later Prime Minister) Bill Rowling. Sutherland joined the Labour Party himself and worked with Rowling, first as treasurer of the Tasman Labour Party electorate committee, and subsequently as its chairman. Sutherland would later attribute his political acumen to Rowling's tutelage. He then sought nomination as Labour candidate for Nelson, in 1980 during Mel Courtney's split with the Labour Party. He was narrowly defeated for the nomination by Philip Woollaston. That same year he unsuccessfully sought the position of vice-president of the Labour Party.

He moved back to Christchurch in 1984 and worked as a union official and continued his political involvement. He was assistant secretary of the Canterbury, Westland and Nelson Shop Employees' Union and chairman of the Labour Party's Canterbury Regional Council.

== Political career ==
New Zealand Parliament
Years	Term	Electorate	List	Party
1987–1990	42nd	Avon		Labour
1990–1993	43rd	Avon		Labour
1993–1996	44th	Avon		Labour
1996–1999	45th	Christchurch East	none	Labour

Sutherland was first elected to Parliament in the 1987 election as MP for the Christchurch electorate of Avon, replacing the retiring Mary Batchelor after a tight three-way contest for the Labour candidacy. His first term in Parliament was a very stressful time for him. Labour ministers such as Roger Douglas and Richard Prebble were leading the party down a right-wing track (Rogernomics). Traditional Labour members resisted but were outnumbered and Sutherland saw himself as "in opposition in his own caucus". When high-profile Labour MP Jim Anderton quit the party to form the NewLabour Party in protest of Rogernomics, Sutherland was widely tipped to follow him to the new party. His decision to stay and fight for "old Labour" values drew criticism from some in the union movement. He was vindicated in this regard when the party later turned its back on Rogernomics following the governments defeat in 1990 election.

Sutherland supported Helen Clark's leadership coup bid after the 1993 election and, in perhaps his most outspoken moment, called on disgruntled MPs to "pull their heads in" and listen to rank-and-file members who wanted an end to Labour's internal bickering. He retained that electorate until it was abolished in the 1996 election, when he successfully contested the reconstituted Christchurch East electorate. He opted not to be placed on Labour's 1996 party list. He retired from politics at the 1999 election. When announcing his retirement he said he wanted to look for new career directions and spend more time with his family and also reaffirmed his opposition to Rogernomics stating "I hope we are now at a turning point in New Zealand history where the absolute waste and stupidity of free market ideology is coming under scrutiny".

Sutherland's most notable incident as an MP was a late night escapade where he swam a length of the parliamentary swimming pool whilst wearing National Prime Minister Jenny Shipley's togs. While a shock to the public, he was renowned around Parliament by colleagues as a prankster and possessing an active sense of humour.

From 1990 to 1993 he was Labour's spokesperson for Consumer Affairs and Civil Defense and spokesperson for Family Affairs from 1996 to 1999. Sutherland did not hold any ministerial portfolios, but became Labour's Junior Whip in 1993. He was noted among his colleagues as a hard worker behind the scenes as junior whip, contributing much to party unity through a time of frequent rifts.

== Later life and death ==
After leaving politics, he went into business as owner of a video store. He had always been a technology enthusiast and liked to possess state of the art stereo and television equipment.

Sutherland died suddenly in Christchurch on 21 June 2005, aged 54. He was survived by wife Verna, son David, daughter Christine and one grandchild.

== Notes ==
New Zealand Parliament
Preceded by Mary Batchelor	Member of Parliament for Avon; 1987–1996	abolished
In abeyance Title last held by Mabel Howard	Member of Parliament for Christchurch East; 1996–1999	Succeeded by Lianne Dalziel
