= Elizabeth Watts-Russell =

New Zealand community leader

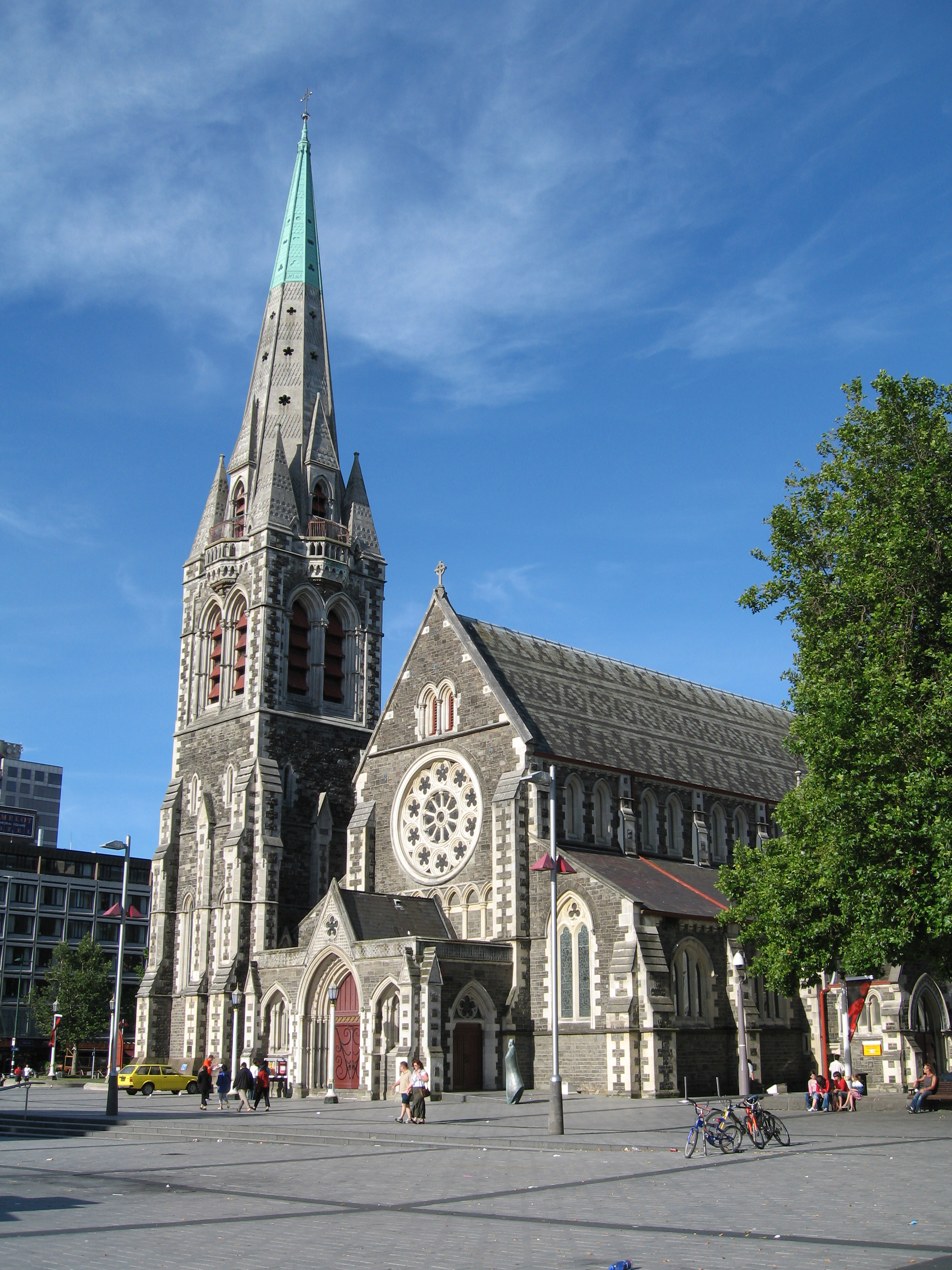
ChristChurch Cathedral, with the western porch paid for by Watts-Russell

Elizabeth Rose Rebecca Watts-Russell (1833/34 – 7 October 1905) was a New Zealand community leader. As Elizabeth Rose Rebecca Bradshaw, she was born in Ireland in about 1833.

She married John Watts-Russell and they emigrated to Canterbury on Sir George Seymour in 1850. After her husband's death on 2 April 1875, she married his friend, Alfred Richard Creyke on 28 April 1877 at the British Embassy in Paris. After Creyke died in 1893, she arranged for the western porch of the ChristChurch Cathedral to be built in his memory. On the south side of the cathedral's nave, there is also a Watts-Russell Memorial Window.

She died, aged 71, on 7 October 1905 at Holbrook, Horsham in West Sussex. She was buried at Brompton Cemetery, London.
