= 1862 Avon by-election =

New Zealand by-election

The 1862 Avon by-election was a by-election held on 11 June 1862 during the 3rd New Zealand Parliament in the Christchurch electorate of Avon.

The by-election was caused by the resignation of the incumbent MP Alfred Richard Creyke.

The by-election was won by William Thomson. He was unopposed.

At two other Canterbury by-elections held in June 1862 for Ellesmere and Heathcote the candidates were also returned unopposed; see 1862 by-election and 1862 by-election.
