= Department of Island Territories =

The Department of Island Territories was a New Zealand government department that was tasked with administrating New Zealand's three Pacific Islands territories—the Cook Islands (until 1965), Niue, and Tokelau—and the country's League of Nations mandate, Samoa (until 1962). It was established on 3 October 1919 under the "External Affairs Bill" as the Department of External Affairs. In 1943, the department was renamed the Department of Island Territories after a separate Department of External Affairs was created to conduct the country's external relations. In 1975, the department was dissolved and its functions were absorbed back into the Ministry of Foreign Affairs, the successor to the External Affairs Department.

The department was headed by a minister of island territories who oversaw the Resident-Commissioners of the Cook Islands and of Niue, and the Administrator of the Tokelau Islands. Until the appointment of John Mathison in 1957, the Minister of Island Territories was contemporaneously the Minister of External Affairs.

The Island Territories Department was responsible for the formulation and development of New Zealand government policy towards its Island Territories. The department's other functions included transmitting advice and assistance from other New Zealand government departments to local Island governments, operating the ship GMV Moana Roa, and acting as a purchasing agent for the Island Territories. The department had offices in both the capital, Wellington, and the New Zealand's largest city, Auckland.

== List of ministers ==
The following ministers have held the office of Minister of Island Territories.

Key

Reform United Labour National

No.	Name	Portrait	Term of office		Prime Minister
1	James Allen		24 November 1919	28 April 1920	Massey
2	Ernest Lee		17 May 1920	13 January 1923	Massey
3	Francis Bell		7 June 1923	18 January 1926	Massey
3	Francis Bell		7 June 1923	18 January 1926	Bell
3	Francis Bell		7 June 1923	18 January 1926	Coates
4	William Nosworthy		24 May 1926	24 August 1928	Coates
5	Gordon Coates		25 August 1928	10 December 1928	Coates
6	Joseph Ward		10 December 1928	28 May 1930	Ward
7	George Forbes		28 May 1930	6 December 1935	Forbes
8	Michael Joseph Savage		6 December 1935	27 March 1940	Savage
9	Frank Langstone		1 April 1940	21 December 1942	Fraser
10	Peter Fraser		7 July 1943	13 December 1949	Fraser
11	Frederick Doidge		13 December 1949	19 September 1951	Holland
12	Clifton Webb		19 September 1951	26 November 1954	Holland
13	Tom Macdonald		26 November 1954	12 December 1957	Holland
13	Tom Macdonald		26 November 1954	12 December 1957	Holyoake
14	John Mathison		12 December 1957	12 December 1960	Nash
15	Leon Götz		12 December 1960	20 December 1963	Holyoake
16	Ralph Hanan		20 December 1963	24 July 1969	Holyoake
17	Duncan MacIntyre		24 July 1969	8 December 1972	Holyoake
17	Duncan MacIntyre		24 July 1969	8 December 1972	Marshall
18	Phil Amos		8 December 1972	10 September 1974	Kirk
18	Phil Amos		8 December 1972	10 September 1974	Rowling
