= Edwin Blake =

New Zealand politician

New Zealand Parliament
| Years | Term | Electorate | Party |
|---|---|---|---|
| 1887 | 9th | Avon | Independent |
| 1887–1890 | 10th | Avon | Independent |
| 1890–1893 | 11th | Avon | Liberal |

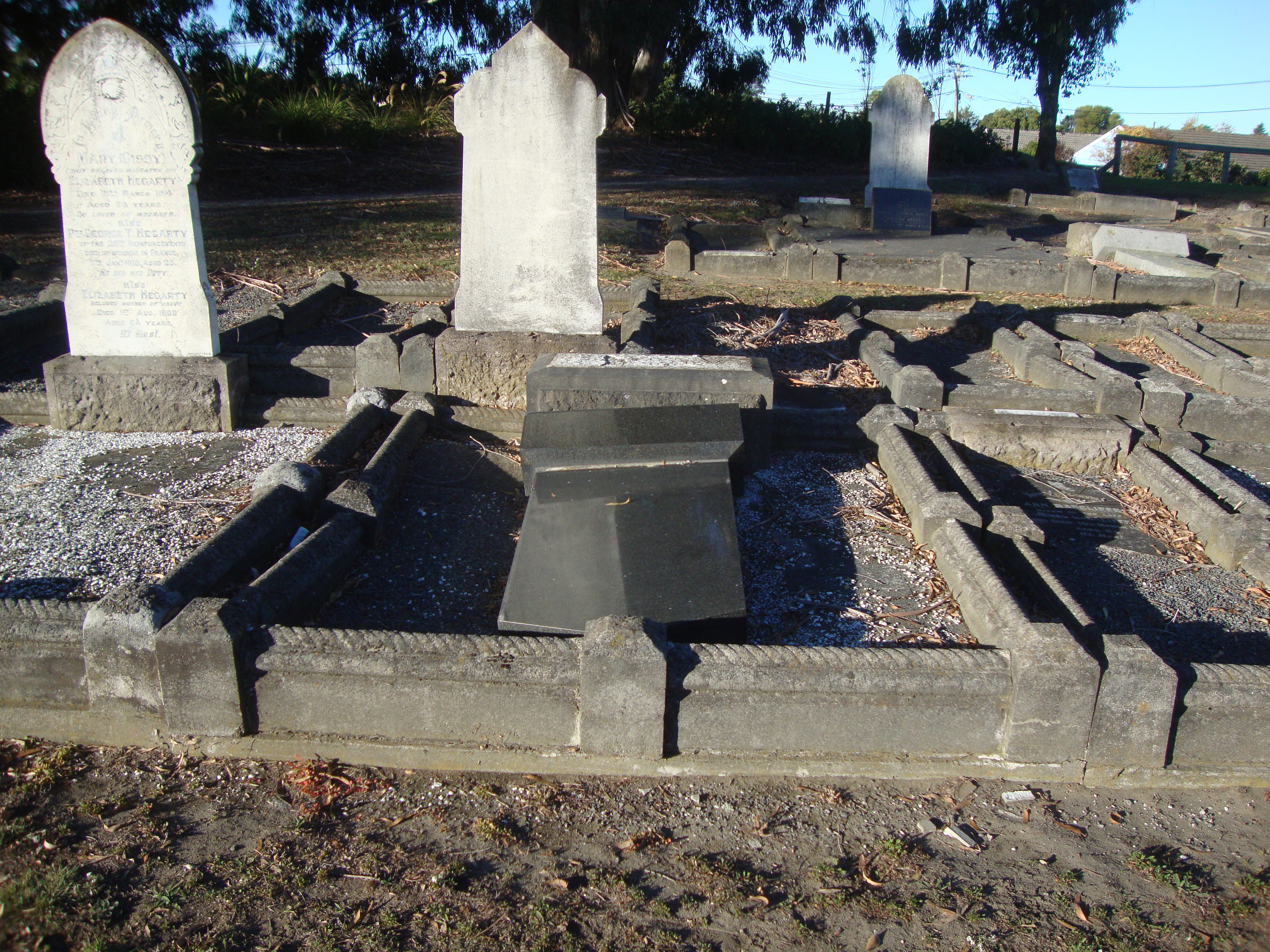
The headstone of Edwin Blake at Linwood Cemetery, probably fallen over in the 22 February 2011 Christchurch earthquake

Edwin Blake (1830 – 18 March 1914) was a 19th-century Liberal Party Member of Parliament in Canterbury, New Zealand.

== Early life ==
Blake was born in Hampstead, England. He and his brother Walter were both educated at Wimborne and then Eton College. Edwin Blake was a civil engineer and surveyor. In England, he worked on railway projects.

== New Zealand ==
Edwin Blake came to Otago in 1861 and moved to Christchurch in 1863. The West Coast gold rush necessitated overland connections between Christchurch and the West Coast. Early in 1865, the Blake brothers had a contract with the Canterbury Provincial Council to improve the track over Harper Pass, the 962 metres (3,156 ft) high pass connecting the Hurunui and Taramakau Rivers. This contract was completed by April of that year, and Walter Blake was then put in charge of sections of the dray road built over Arthur's Pass, but the contract was soon assigned to Edwin Blake. One of the sections was adjacent to Lake Brunner, at the time still part of the route to the West Coast. This was soon superseded by a more direct route built by Walter Blake that followed the Taramakau River. Edwin Blake was then commissioned to widen the track through the Otira Valley down to the Taipo River. When the road construction projects were completed, Blake settled on the West Coast.

In the 1881 election, Blake contested the Kumara electorate, but was beaten by 700 to 624 votes by Richard Seddon. He moved back to Christchurch in 1882, but contested the Kumara electorate once again in the 1884 election; the incumbent Seddon again won the contest. Blake represented the Avon electorate from the 1887 Avon by-election to 1893, when he was defeated standing in the Lyttelton electorate.

He died on 18 March 1914 and was buried at Linwood Cemetery. Blakes Road in Belfast is named for him and his younger brother John William.

== Notes ==
New Zealand Parliament
| Preceded by Leonard Harper | Member of Parliament for Avon; 1887–1893 | Succeeded by William Tanner |
