= 1932 Christchurch tramway strike =

Labour dispute in New Zealand

The 1932 Christchurch tramway strike was an industrial dispute between tramway workers and their employers that took place in the city of Christchurch, New Zealand during the Great Depression. It lasted 16 days and led to the injury and arrest of many local people on both sides of the dispute.

== Origins ==
During the Great Depression the Christchurch Tramway Board faced financial problems from falling revenue. In 1931 the Tramway Board attempted to cut salaries and working conditions, exploiting a legal loophole in the Industrial Conciliation and Arbitration Act. The Tramway Workers' Union rejected the proposed changes and as a result the board dismissed the entire traffic staff and opened applications for replacement positions under the new conditions. To settle the dispute an independent mediator was brought in and largely found in the union's favour. Nonetheless, an atmosphere of mistrust between the board and workers manifested.

In early 1932 the board proposed to rationing work hours for a period of two months to prevent redundancies, to which the union grudgingly agreed. When the period ended the board sought to extend the arrangement the union refused. The board responded by dismissing 12 employees (including the union president John Mathison) as a way to reduce costs. The board's decision was seen as provocative and deliberate and the union retaliated by threatening industrial action if the 12 employees were not reinstated. The board refused and the union met on 1 May to vote on whether to take strike action. Mathison warned the meeting that if a strike was to occur the city "will be plunged into the first instalment of an industrial war", which was a grimly apt prediction. Tensions were high nationwide at the time with major unemployment riots having broken out in Auckland, Wellington and Dunedin already.

The union voted in favour of striking and the 700 members then marched, brandishing red banners, through the city to Cranmer Square as part of a planned celebration of International Workers' Day. Police forecasted unrest and warned local shopkeepers to secure their windows, though the day's events were peaceful in conduct. The tramway workers joined other activists and unemployed men (the newspaper The Press estimated the number exceeding 10,000) to hear speeches and resolutions. Such a display of industrial unity worried the board who cabled the government to request a suspension of the Act requiring certified motormen on trams.

On Monday morning newspapers were published containing advertisements for new positions and notices to all employees that failure to report for work on Wednesday would result in their immediate dismissal. The same day the union offered to renegotiate the work rationing scheme if all employees were reinstated, but it was rejected by the board. Due to the high number of unemployed men there was no shortage of applicants for the newly advertised positions.

== Strike action ==
The first day of the strike was a peaceful one in which the board could only offer a greatly reduced daytime only service, resulting in many usual patrons walking to and from work that day. Several hundred strikers and their supporters had gathered at 6 am to watch trams go out of the yard and identified 39 employees who had refused to join the strike (scabs). A police escort was then given to subsequent services to prevent reprisals against the scab workers. On Thursday there were multiple police reports of mainly minor incidents of attempts at impeding the tram services, including shorting overhead wires with a length of steel. The homes of many scabs were also visited by groups of threatening unionists.

The next day a tram was pelted with a volley of rocks heading up Fitzgerald Avenue. Many windows were smashed and the driver suffered minor injuries. Police confronted the assailants and melee combat broke out with police attacking with batons while some unionists and their supporters fashioned improvised clubs. Initially outnumbered the police were reinforced by dozens of previously sworn-in "special" constables, civilians sworn in under oath to act under police command, causing the unionists to flee. A total of 19 people were arrested, including 5 scabs. News of the open brawling shocked the city and prominent citizens worked to bring the two parties together while overall public sympathy for the strikers grew. A silent march of 300 strikers that night to Cathedral Square who were met at their arrival by a crowd of over 4000 supporters. The crowd was so large that people were blocking tramlines. When requested they cooperated in moving, only to shift on to tracks elsewhere. Tempers grew and fist fighting broke out between the attendees and police. The outnumbered police were forced into a corner by the Chief Post Office before drawing batons and driving the crowd back defusing a potential riot. Many were arrested and transported away using a fleet of commandeered taxis.

A bus-load of police forestalled a potential attack on a tram in Hagley Park the next morning after which police discovered an assortment of clubs, discarded by the would-be attackers. At midday leaders of the two parties made their first attempt at a settlement. Each group was seated in separate rooms and unable to reach an agreement. The disagreement was due to the board's refusal to renege on its promise of permanent employment to the new workers it had hired since the start of the strike and the union would not end the strike until their members were reinstated in place of the replacements workers. The proposals were later passed by both parties to the head mediator Sir Arthur Donnelly, Q.C. who had the casting vote.

Most of the strikers’ antagonism was against the "special" constables. Most were members of the middle class and seen as partisan supporters of the board with no sympathy for the tram workers. Rugby players Beau Cottrell, George Hart and Jack Manchester were among the "specials" and drew particular hostility. That weekend a crowd of around 7000 (far exceeding normal attendance) went to Lancaster Park to watch Christchurch RFC (the club of Cottrell, Hart and Manchester) play Merivale-Papanui. The game was overshadowed by noisy chanting and jeering and after is completion half of the crowd formed outside the park for a demonstration. Around 4000 people formed into a mass to block roads preventing the Christchurch RFC players leaving the ground. Several bottles were thrown and chants, referring disparagingly to the three players, were conveyed aggressively. Police reinforcements arrived and a column drew batons and engaged the crowd clearing a path and allowed the Black Maria carrying the players to leave.

Due to police being sent to Lancaster Park, many trams had insufficient police protection and several trams were attacked. On one such tram a conductor, William Henry Victor Laing, was punched in the face and went unattended during the chaos. Laing became infected with blood poisoning and died three weeks later on 29 May from the resulting complications. James Duncan Burke was charged with manslaughter but was found not guilty.

The day after the rugby game the windows of two shops owned by "specials" had rocks thrown through them. The day after a rock was thrown through a tram window leading to the board covering tram windows with steel mesh and a high barbed wire fence around the barn to be built where the trams were stored at night.

Following the confrontation at Lancaster Park the violence largely abated, though police and specials continued to patrol the suburbs, sandhills and Hagley Park. On 10 May the strike was called off. The strike didn't end until 17 May after both sides agreed to accept the tribunal's decision.

== Outcome ==
Donnelly, in his report to the tribunal, did not apportion blame for the events on anyone but did say he found the events without "necessity or excuse" and excessive given what he deemed a minor disagreement. He concluded that the board had acted unwisely by dismissing the employees and in particularly the president of the union (Mathison) and should have foreseen the potential for reprisals. He ruled that 60 of the new employees hired since the strike began be retained with the remaining staff being made up of striking workers with an hour rationing system. As a consequence 40 union members were dismissed instead of the initial 12. By the time of the ruling Mathison had accepted employment at the Christchurch Star-Sun instead, a move for which he was heavily criticised.

Both the Tramway Workers' Union and local branches of the Labour Party proved to be outlets for frustrated workers and the unemployed. By voicing dissatisfaction here they became vital outlets for the most discontented in Christchurch and this was ironically a major factor in why the tramway strike failed to widen into a general uprising against the social disruption caused by the depression.

At the 1933 local-body elections the Labour Party ticket (including Mathison) won a landslide victory for Tramway Board representatives. It then made its first act the commitment to re-employ all the workers who were dismissed as a result of the strike. As vacancies arose the positions were offered to the dismissed employees and by 1935 all who wished so were once again employed by the Tramway Board, many giving many years loyal service to Christchurch's transportation service.

== See also ==
- Christchurch tramway system
