= 1887 Avon by-election =

New Zealand by-election

The Avon by-election was held in 1887 to elect a member for the Avon electorate to the New Zealand House of Representatives, during the 9th session of Parliament. The election was held on 1 June 1887, less than four months before the next general election. Edwin Blake won the election against William Dunlop, with a majority of 3.

1887 Avon by-election
Candidate	Votes			%
Candidate	Papanui	Riccarton	Total	%
Edwin Blake	162	93	255	49.32
William Dunlop	190	62	252	48.74
Informal votes	10			1.93
Turnout	517			
Majority for Blake	3			0.58

Turnout was particularly low; in the previous election (which Dunlop lost by a greater margin) 731 valid votes (69%) were cast in an electorate of 1,065 voters, while in the following election (held by Blake) 1,428 valid votes (72%) were cast in an electorate of 1,990 voters.
