= Sir George Seymour (1844 ship) =

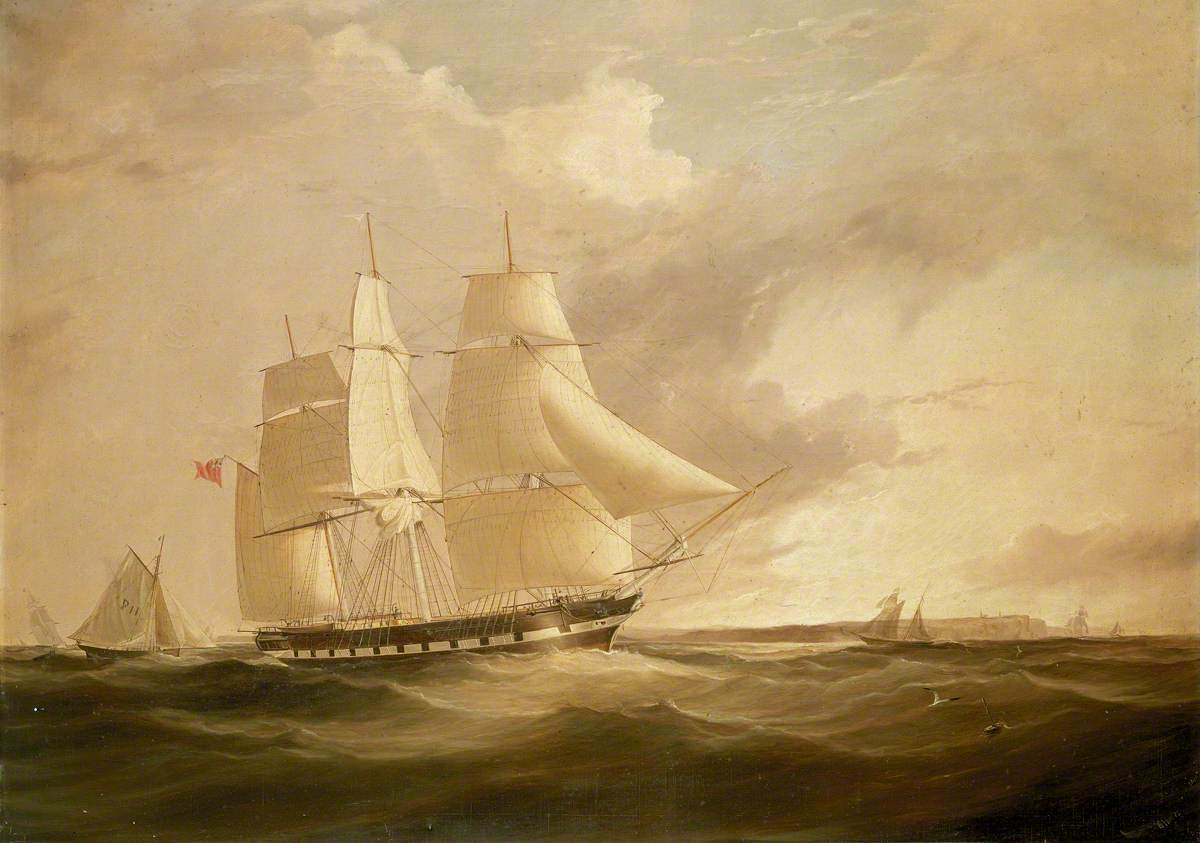
- Ship Sir George Seymour sailing down the Channel with other shipping with the coast in the background. W.T. Howard, National Maritime Museum, Greenwich

History

United Kingdom
- Namesake: Sir George Francis Seymour (Note: Sir George Francis Seymour (1787–1870), was an Admiral who married Georgina Mary Berkeley, daughter of Admiral Sir George Cranfield Berkeley.)
- Builder: Somes Brothers
- Launched: 1844
- Fate: Burnt and abandoned 18 December 1867

General characteristics
- Tons burthen: 580 (old), or 872 (new) (bm)
- Length: 141 ft 0 in (43.0 m)
- Beam: 33 ft 0 in (10.1 m)
- Depth: 22 ft 7 in (6.9 m)
- Notes: Yellow Metal sheathing

Sir George Seymour was built in Sunderland, Tyne and Wear, England in 1844, by the Somes Brothers. She made one voyage transporting convicts to Australia and at least one carrying emigrants to Australia and one to New Zealand. A fire at sea in her cargo in December 1867, forced her crew to abandon her.

== Convict transport ==
On 4 November 1844, Sir George Seymour, John Young Clarke, master, set sail from England, bound for Van Diemen's Land, Australia; she arrived at Hobart on 27 February 1845. She had embarked 345 male convicts and she landed 175 at Port Phillip and 169 at Hobart; one convict died on the voyage. She sailed for Calcutta on 27 June, with 132 horses, and other cargo and passengers.

== 1849 emigrant voyage to Australia ==
Sir George Seymour sailed from Plymouth on 9 January 1849, bound for Geelong, Victoria. She was carrying 302 assisted immigrants and assorted cargo. (Ten vessels, carrying over 1000 immigrants to Australia, left that week.) She anchored off Port Henry on 14 May; she arrived at Melbourne 1 June. On 3 July, she sailed from Sydney, bound for Singapore and Calcutta.

== 1850 emigrant voyage to New Zealand ==
In 1850, Sir George Seymour was one of the First Four Ships to carry emigrants from England to the new colony of Canterbury in New Zealand on behalf of the Canterbury Association.

Sir George Seymour left Plymouth Sound, England around 11 am on Sunday, 8 September 1850, with about 227 passengers. On 4 October, she sighted Randolph and a Mr. Davy, who had missed that ship at Plymouth, took the opportunity to change vessels and complete the voyage in his assigned ship and cabin, and be reunited with his outfit. One of Randolph's boats executed the passenger exchange and some of that ship's passengers took the opportunity to visit. The two ships sailed in company until 10 October. The ship sailed southward til, on 7 December, nearly 49° S. Then about 4 am on Wednesday, 11 December, she sighted Stewart's Island, apparently earlier than either the Charlotte Jane or the Randolph did on that same day. However, she sailed closer to the coast of the South Island than her sister ships and dropped anchor in Port Victoria (off Lyttelton) at 10 am on Tuesday, 17 December 1850, a day later than Charlotte Jane. Her passage was 100 days. Two young children died during the journey.

The passengers aboard the first four ships were referred to as "The Pilgrims". Their names are inscribed on marble plaques in Cathedral Square in the centre of Christchurch.

The ship is remembered in the name of a road, George Seymour Quay, in the port town of Lyttelton.

=== Notable passengers ===
- John Anderson (1820–1897), second mayor of Christchurch
- John Anderson (1850–1934), son of John Anderson Sr.
- Guise Brittan (1807–1876), first Commissioner of Crown Lands for Canterbury
- Emily Foster (1842–1897), teacher and school principal; daughter of Guise Brittan
- Walpole Chesshyre Fendall (1830–1913), founder of Fendall Town (Fendalton)
- Richard James Strachan Harman (1826–1902), politician and businessman
- Henry Jacobs (1824–1901), first Dean of Christchurch
- Elizabeth Watts-Russell (1833–1905), community leader and wife of John Watts-Russell
- John Watts-Russell (1825–1875), politician and runholder

== Later career and fate ==
In 1865, Sir George Seymour underwent repairs for damages. At the time her master was M'Ewen, her owner Higgins & Co., her homeport London, and her trade "Brs".

A fire destroyed Sir George Seymour in 1867. She was carrying a cargo of coal from Liverpool to Bombay when on 18 December 1867, at 25°S 25°W, the cargo suffered spontaneous combustion. Her crew abandoned her. Leda, which was on her way to Calcutta, rescued 15 crew members.

Her entry in Lloyd's Register for 1867, carried the annotation "[B]URNT". The listing gave her master as M'Ewen, but her homeport now was Glasgow, and her owner D. Law.
