= William Reeves (journalist) =

New Zealand journalist and politician

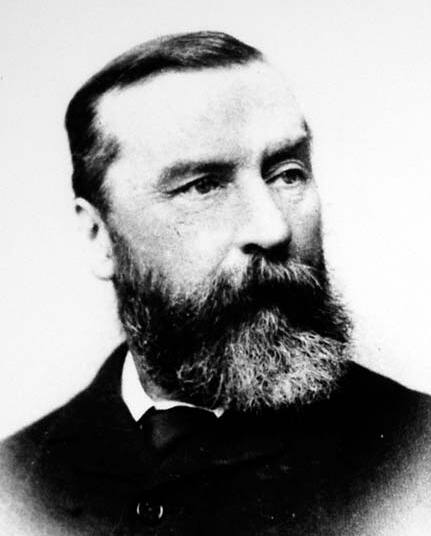
- Portrait of William Reeves

Resident Minister for the Middle (South) Island
- In office 1871–1872

Personal details
- Born: 10 February 1825 Clapham, Surrey, England
- Died: 4 April 1891 (aged 66) Risingholme, Opawa, Christchurch
- Spouse: Ellen Pember
- Children: 8, including William Pember Reeves
- Relatives: Amber Reeves (granddaughter)
- Occupation: Owner of the Lyttelton Times

William Reeves (10 February 1825 – 4 April 1891) was a New Zealand 19th century journalist and politician. He was the father of the author and politician the Hon. William Pember Reeves.

Reeves was born in 1825 in Clapham, Surrey, England.

New Zealand Parliament
Years	Term	Electorate	Party
1867–1868	4th	Avon	Independent
1871–1875	5th	Selwyn	Independent

He represented the Avon electorate from an 1867 by-election to 1868, when he resigned as the November 1867 death of his business partner, Crosbie Ward, prevented him from attending the upcoming parliamentary session in Wellington. He contested the Selwyn electorate in 1871 against Edward Cephas John Stevens and had a majority of one vote. He was Resident Minister for the Middle (South) Island in the 3rd Fox Ministry in 1871–1872. The dominant topic for the 1875 election was the abolition of the Provinces. Reeves favoured the retention of the provincial system of government, whilst Cecil Fitzroy, 20 years his junior, was an abolitionist. Fitzroy narrowly won the election in the Selwyn electorate by 14 votes. On 21 October 1884, Reeves was appointed to the New Zealand Legislative Council. He served until his death on 4 April 1891.

He was a journalist and newspaper proprietor in Christchurch and Lyttelton, and was the principal proprietor of the Lyttelton Times, though he died virtually bankrupt (he had failed on the Stock Exchange in England before migrating to New Zealand).

William and Ellen Reeves in front of Risingholme, c. 1880

Reeves underwent an operation at the end of March 1891. Later in the week, complications set in and he died the following day on 4 April 1891 at his homestead 'Risingholme'. He is buried at Barbadoes Street Cemetery and it was the largest Christchurch funeral since William Sefton Moorhouse had died 10 years earlier. Risingholme in the Christchurch suburb of Opawa was registered by the New Zealand Historic Places Trust (now Heritage New Zealand) as a Category II heritage building on 24 June 2005.

Reeves was survived by his wife and their eight children. His son, William Pember Reeves, who became a dominant politician in New Zealand, was married to Maud Pember Reeves. Amber Reeves was his granddaughter.

== Notes ==
New Zealand Parliament
Preceded by Crosbie Ward	Member of Parliament for Avon; 1867–1868	Succeeded by William Rolleston
Preceded by Edward Cephas John Stevens	Member of Parliament for Selwyn; 1871–1875	Succeeded by Cecil Fitzroy
