= Islay Marsden =

Emerita professor of marine biology in New Zealand

Academic background
- Thesis: Adaptations of sphaeroma rugicauda (leach) from a salt marsh habitat (1974)

Academic work
- Institutions: University of Canterbury

Islay Diane Marsden is a New Zealand marine biologist and toxicologist, and is a professor emerita at the University of Canterbury. Marsden's research focuses on Crustacea and bivalves. She has researched physiology of oxygen uptake and energy use, and is also interested in environmental factors that affect survival and reproduction of estuarine species, and the cultural values of estuarine habitats.

== Academic career ==
Marsden is a marine biologist and toxicologist. She is interested in physiological ecology of marine invertebrates, and focuses especially on molluscs and Crustacea. She has worked on understanding adaptations that allow survival in intertidal habitats, looking at traits such as oxygen uptake, and energy use. She has also worked on how environmental factors such as microplastics, heavy metals, and toxins from certain dinoflagellates have on the reproduction and survival of marine and estuarine species. She has also published on the use of marine invertebrate populations as indicators of environmental stress. Marsden is interested in mahinga kai (the value of natural resources) and the cultural values of estuaries and beaches in New Zealand.

Marsden completed her PhD at the University of London in 1974. She then joined the faculty of the University of Canterbury, rising to full professor. She was appointed professor emerita in 2019. Marsden is on the board of the Avon-Heathcote Estuary Ihutai Trust. She is on the international advisory board of the Journal of Biological Education, and was a general council member of the New Zealand Marine Sciences Society until 2020.

== Selected works ==
=== Books ===
- Winterbourn, Michael; Knox, George; Burrows, Colin; Marsden, Islay, eds. (May 2008). The Natural History of Canterbury (3rd ed.). Canterbury: Canterbury University Press. ISBN 978-1-877257-57-5.
- Jones, Malcolm; Marsden, Islay D., eds. (November 2005). Life in the Estuary: Illustrated guide and ecology. Canterbury University Press. ISBN 978-1-877257-15-5.

=== Journal articles ===
- Phoebe A. Argyle; Rhodes, Lesley; Kirsty F. Smith; Harwood, David Tim; Tuikolongahau Halafihi; Islay D. Marsden (2023). "Diversity and distribution of benthic dinoflagellates in Tonga include the potentially harmful genera Gambierdiscus and Fukuyoa". Harmful Algae. 130 102524. doi:10.1016/j.hal.2023.102524. PMID 38061817. Wikidata Q124726331.
- Jacqueline A Lee; Islay D Marsden; Glover, Chris (2010). "The influence of salinity on copper accumulation and its toxic effects in estuarine animals with differing osmoregulatory strategies". Aquatic Toxicology. 99 (1): 65–72. doi:10.1016/j.aquatox.2010.04.006. PMID 20434226. Wikidata Q84140887.
- Rathishri Chandurvelan; Islay D Marsden; Glover, Chris; Gaw, Sally (2015). "Assessment of a mussel as a metal bioindicator of coastal contamination: relationships between metal bioaccumulation and multiple biomarker responses". Science of the Total Environment. 511: 663–675. doi:10.1016/j.scitotenv.2014.12.064. PMID 25596351. Wikidata Q46785591.
- Rathishri Chandurvelan; Islay D Marsden; Gaw, Sally; Glover, Chris (2013). "Biochemical biomarker responses of green-lipped mussel, Perna canaliculus, to acute and subchronic waterborne cadmium toxicity". Aquatic Toxicology. 140–141: 303–313. doi:10.1016/j.aquatox.2013.06.015. PMID 23876876. Wikidata Q47957470.
- Rathishri Chandurvelan; Islay D Marsden; Gaw, Sally; Glover, Chris (2012). "Impairment of green-lipped mussel (Perna canaliculus) physiology by waterborne cadmium: relationship to tissue bioaccumulation and effect of exposure duration". Aquatic Toxicology. 124–125: 114–124. doi:10.1016/j.aquatox.2012.07.013. PMID 22940606. Wikidata Q47197681.
- Radford, C.; Islay D Marsden; William Davison (2004). "Temporal variation in the specific dynamic action of juvenile New Zealand rock lobsters, Jasus edwardsii". Comparative Biochemistry and Physiology A. 139 (1): 1–9. doi:10.1016/j.cbpb.2004.02.015. PMID 15471675. Wikidata Q80836526.
- Rathishri Chandurvelan; Islay D Marsden; Gaw, Sally; Glover, Chris (2016). "Acute and sub-chronic effects of sub-lethal cadmium exposure on energy metabolism in the freshwater shrimp, Paratya curvirostris". Ecotoxicology and Environmental Safety. 135: 60–67. doi:10.1016/j.ecoenv.2016.09.018. PMID 27685671. Wikidata Q39338852.
