= Southshore, New Zealand =

Coastal suburb of Christchurch, New Zealand

Southshore
- Suburb
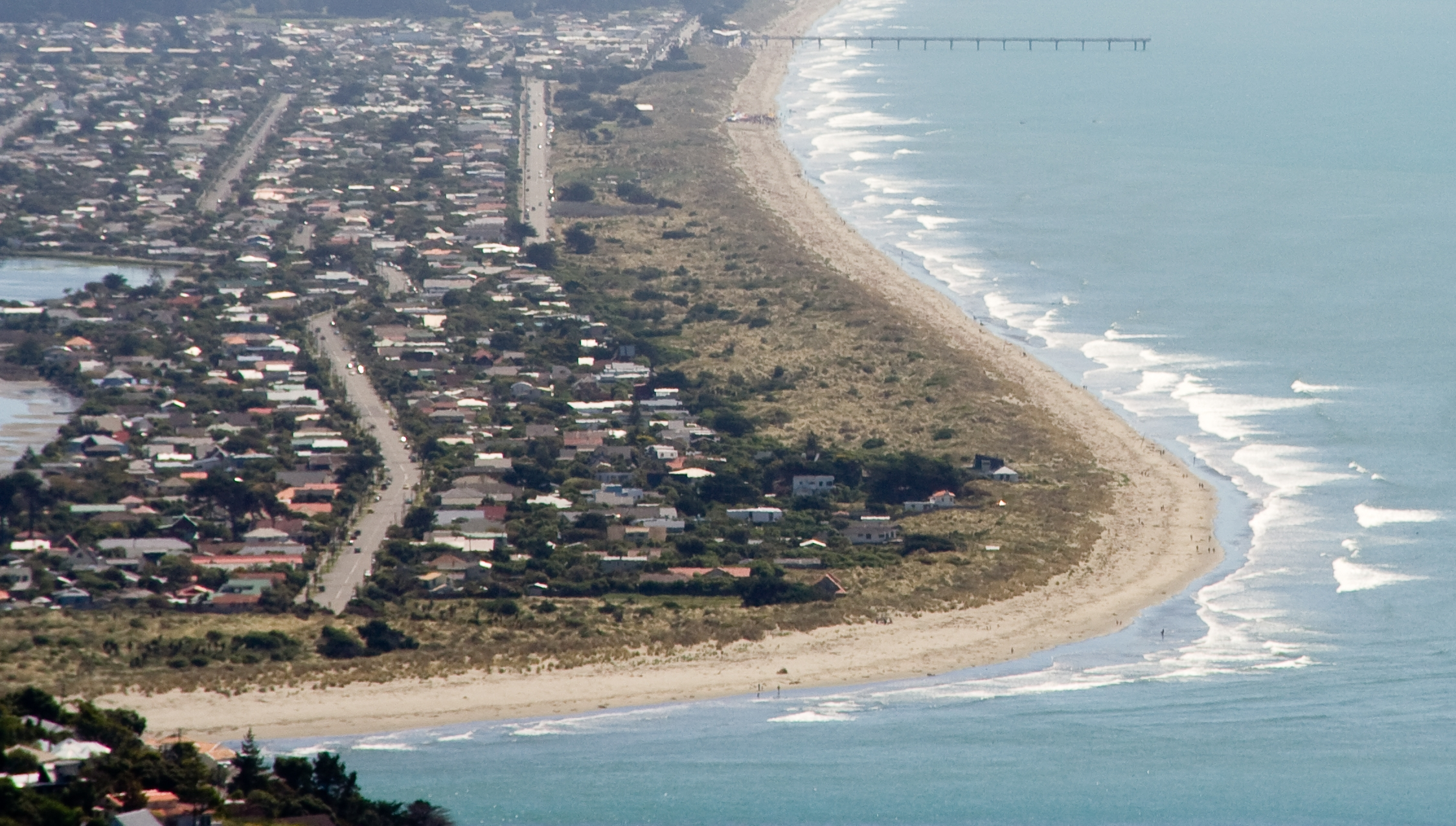
- Southshore and South New Brighton
- Interactive map of Southshore
- Coordinates: 43°33′0″S 172°44′51″E
- Country: New Zealand
- City: Christchurch
- Local authority: Christchurch City Council
- Electoral ward: Coastal
- Community board: Waitai Coastal-Burwood-Linwood

Area
  - Land: 124 ha (310 acres)

Population (2023 Census)
  - Total: 1,095
  - Density: 883/km^{2} (2,290/sq mi)

	South New Brighton
(Avon Heathcote Estuary)	Southshore	(Pegasus Bay)
	Sumner

Southshore (Māori: Te Kōrero Karoro) is an eastern coastal suburb within Christchurch, New Zealand. It is located on a narrow 2.5 km (1.6 mi) long sandspit that runs along the eastern side of the Avon Heathcote Estuary and west of the Pacific Ocean. The suburb is 8 km (5.0 mi) east of the city centre and 5 km (3.1 mi) south of New Brighton's main retail area.

Before urbanisation, the area was largely swampland bordered by large coastal dunes which had some Māori presence. The area holds strong historical and cultural importance to the local Māori hapū, Ngāi Tūāhuriri, because the land and estuary provided a large amount of resources and seafood. Prehistoric evidence of middens in the area combined with Māori occupation on the sandspit indicates a high potential for the presence of archaeology in the area.

In its early years, the area was known locally to early European settlers as Sandhills Run. They constructed baches (holiday homes) and established a dairy station in the suburb. Southshore initially had very few permanent residents due to the absence of facilities and insufficient transportation; it was later urbanised in the late 1940s. The area was damaged in the 2011 Christchurch earthquake and 198 properties were red-zoned. Southshore is prone to coastal-related hazards such as tsunamis and sea level rise. Nationally, Southshore is part of the Christchurch East parliamentary electorate. It is located within the Coastal Ward for local body elections.

Southshore's population predominantly consists of European New Zealanders; its above-average housing costs and coastal setting attracts an older demographic to the area. Notable people with connections to the suburb include the motorcycle speedway rider Ivan Mauger, the former deputy-mayor of Christchurch Peter Skellerup, and the former chairman of the Ngāi Tahu Māori Trust Tipene O'Regan.

== Toponymy ==
The Māori name for the sandspits are Te Kōrero Karoro, (Note: Te Kōrero Karoro refers to the entirety of Southshore and the southern area of South New Brighton.) meaning 'the chattering of the seagulls' or 'the meeting place of the seagulls', and Te Ihutai, literally meaning 'the nose of the tides'.

Prior to the 20th century the area was known locally to early European settlers as Sandhills Run, a name no longer in common usage. The name Southshore was officially adopted in 1955. At the time, the Canterbury Museum advocated for the Māori name Te Kōrero Karoro; however, many locals disliked this proposal because they thought the name was too long and names of Māori origin were generally unpopular on the South Island. The name "Southend" was suggested by the Christchurch City Council, but many residents preferred Southshore, which had been in use for over a decade and was also the name of an early residential subdivision in the suburb.

== History ==
=== Māori settlement ===
Like the rest of Christchurch, the Māori were the first settlers to the area. Southshore was considered an important food-gathering place by local Māori. The area and the estuary were home to a wide range of birds and plants. There were many wharenui (the Māori term for a type of communal house) around the estuary, which were mainly built from raupō and other native trees. Southshore holds historical and cultural importance to local Māori because it has an abundance of pipi and flounder in the estuary. Archaeological evidence of middens in the area combined with the Māori history in the area indicates a high potential for the presence of archaeology in the area.

In the eighteenth century, Māori predominantly grew aruhe and kūmara in the sandy soil around the area of the Avon River / Ōtākaro. Early European settlers discovered Māori fishing equipment, eel traps and hāngī pits, which were used by the Māori primarily to cook seafood. In Southshore's early years, a local jogger presumably discovered a wharenui totem in the sand dunes near Tern Street, but others dispute this, as there is no documentation. Later, a skull was discovered which dated to Māori occupation of the area.

Southshore holds cultural significance for Ngāi Tūāhuriri, who are the kaitiaki (caretakers) of the area, and have special food-gathering rights in the estuary and the area. There was a walking track from the fortified settlement of Kaiapoi Pā towards South New Brighton, and onwards further to the area now known as Southshore and beyond across the Avon Heathcote Estuary to the Banks Peninsula. There was also a sand dune walking track called Pohoareare, between the Ōpāwaho settlement to New Brighton and onwards to Te Kōrero Karoro.

=== European settlement ===
Prior to the 20th century the area was known locally to early European settlers as "Sandhills Run". As more settlers arrived, they constructed baches and established a dairy station in the suburb. In 1916, most of the suburb was subdivided into residential sections. There was sparse transportation and lack of facilities in the area in the early twentieth century and Southshore had very few permanent residents. The spit was used as a gun range for volunteers to practise during World War I and following. A local resident between 1940 and 1945 reported that the New Zealand Army bulldozed the sandhills and removed the vegetation around Caspian Street to set up a position for defence. This work possibly lowered the land surface here, and the area is prone to extensive flooding by estuary and sea waters. In 1958, another local resident filled a marshy area in use of six sections before building at the Caspian Street and Estuary Road intersection. Development in the suburb was slow because of the absence of facilities; the residents only received a water supply in 1954. In 1953, Southshore residents received electricity. Southshore grew rapidly and was heavily urbanised after World War II in the late 1940s. Southshore later received a sewerage system in 1967. Channelling and kerbs were also installed to the suburb's main road, Rocking Horse Road, which often flooded.

There is a large public reserve at the southern end of the suburb, which is the location of most of the suburb's recreational activities. Southshore has no primary or secondary schools, the nearest primary school is South New Brighton School (established in 1922), 3.2 km (2.0 mi) to the north. A few decades ago, the only residential buildings in Southshore were baches. Today, Southshore is home to a range of residences, from large modern homes with all the early homes that have been mostly renovated. Not much land in the suburb is left undeveloped. (Note: Excluding the land located in the residential red zone.) Its housing type is mid-20th century to contemporary homes.

== Geography ==
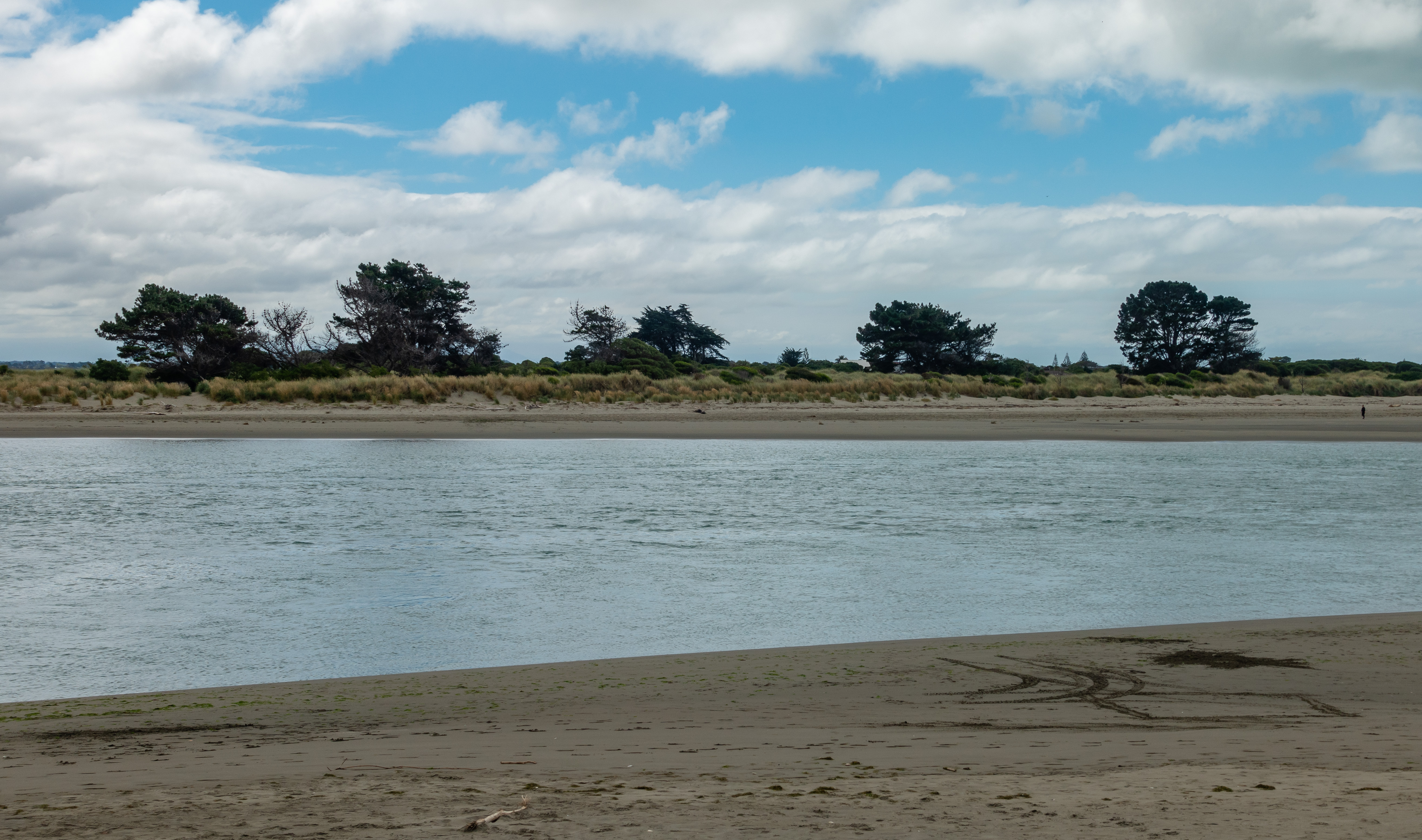
Southshore Spit from Sumner Beach

Southshore is sited on a narrow sandspit which is situated between the Pacific Ocean and the Avon Heathcote Estuary. The Avon-Heathcote Estuary was formed between 1000 and 2000 years ago by longshore drift. Sand from the mouth of the Waimakariri River was carried southward the east coast of the South Island, and built up along the coastline of what is now Christchurch, progressively forming what is known as the Southshore Spit. The spit is a 2.5 km (1.6 mi) long sandspit with a minimum width of about 300 m (980 ft) at the suburb's boundary with South New Brighton and a maximum width of 500 m (1,600 ft) at its southern end.

To the north of Southshore is South New Brighton's main retail area; to the south of the suburb across the estuary lies the suburb of Sumner and Rapanui Rock, also known as "Shag Rock". The Sumner bar forms a natural barrier between the suburbs. Other suburbs across the estuary include Redcliffs, Mount Pleasant, and Ferrymead.

Prior to European settlement, the area now occupied by Rockinghorse Road from Heron Street to Torea Street was largely swampland, bordered by large coastal sand dunes, that were prone to flooding at high tide. In Christchurch's early years, the Brighton spit generally referred to all the land south of Bridge Street. Today, the Southshore's boundary with South New Brighton is considered to be Caspian Street. (Note: Christchurch has no official definition of the boundaries of suburbs, and as a result there may be inconsistencies between sources about some boundaries. A sign is also located on Caspian Street indicating Southshore's presumed boundaries.) The western side of the Southshore spit commands views of the estuary, other eastern suburbs of Christchurch, and parts of the Hillsborough spur.

Christchurch's coastline is characterised by intermediate-type sandy beaches. Historically, coastal dunes provided important resources for local Māori, including weaving materials from made the natural sand binder pīngao. In the 19th century, naitive vegetation were removed or burned by early European settlers. Introduced plants such as marram grass were rebuilt and stabilised when the settlers realised the dunes were a useful coastal protection resource.

As a coastal suburb, Southshore is exposed to complex sea-level rise scenarios, flooding and coastal erosion risks. As of 2024, the Christchurch City Council has approved NZ$12,500,000 in funding to address issues related to erosion and flooding in Southsore and South New Brighton. The council rejected a request to restore collapsed walls along the red-zoned estuary edge, and have proposed a cobble beach along the eastern edge of the estuary. Challenges to the proposed plan are the local archaeological sites and coastal bird populations. Southshore is also prone to other sea-related hazards such as tsunamis and storms.

== Gallery ==
Gallery of the suburb

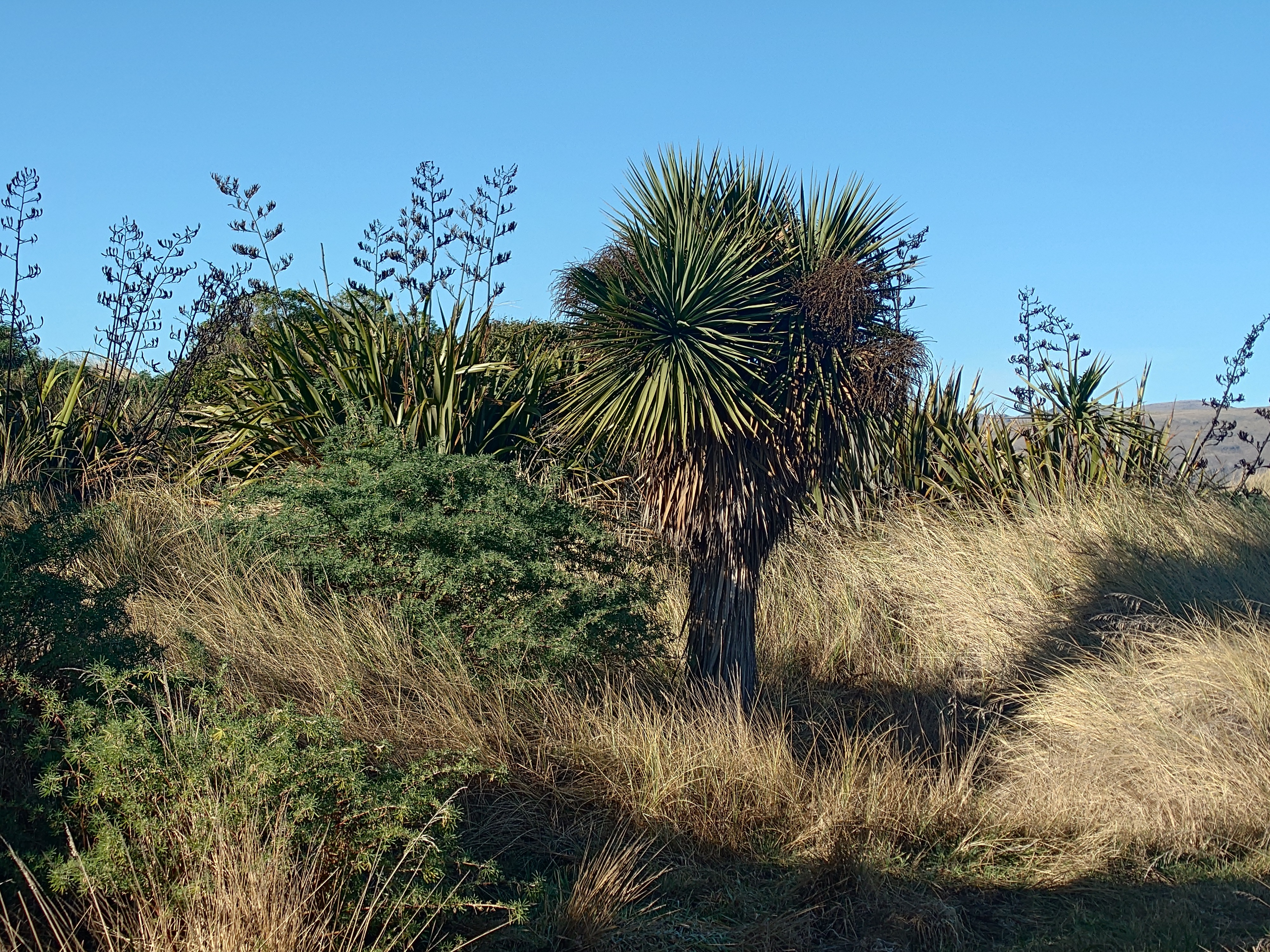
Tī kōuka in the sand dunes near Tern Street.

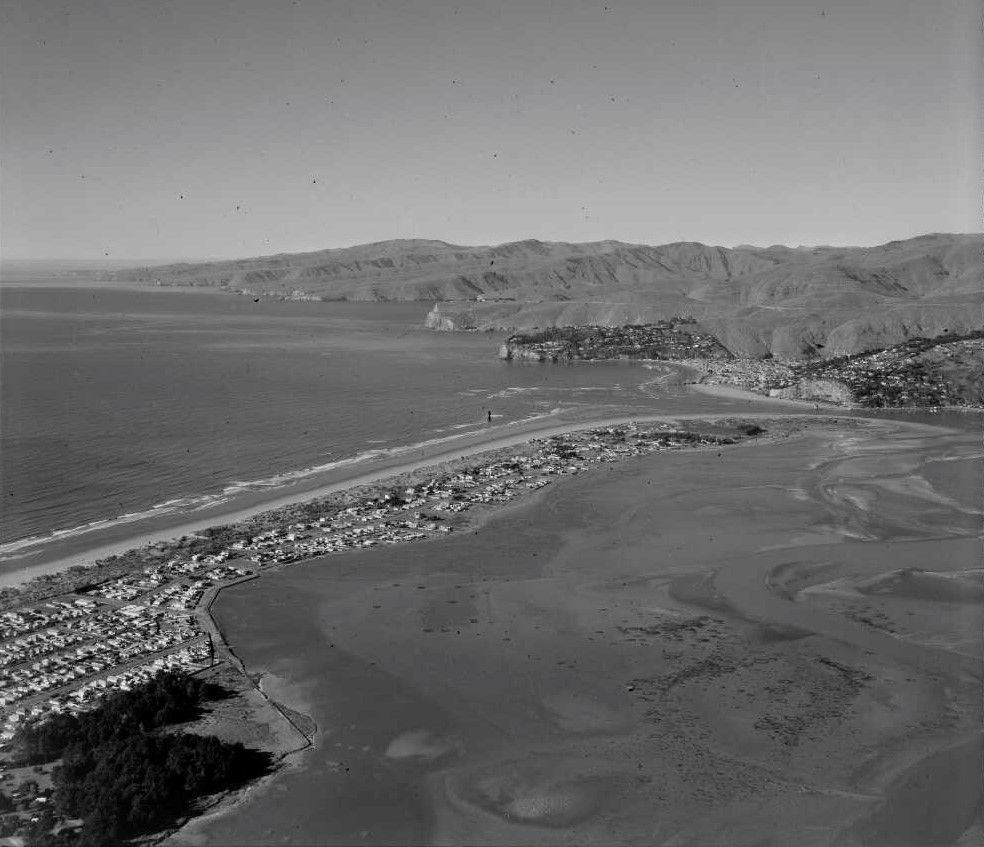
Aerial view of Southshore (1974)

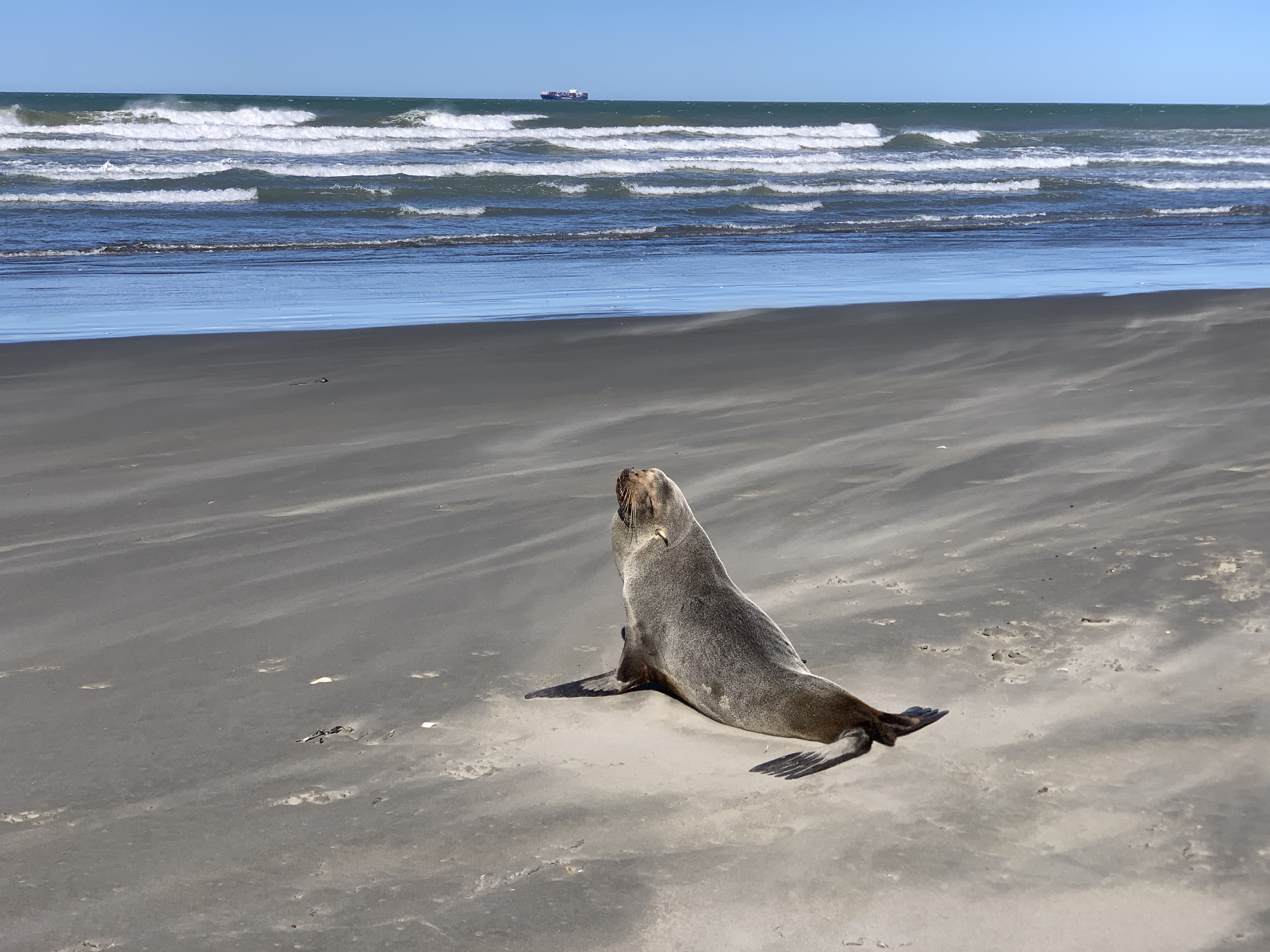
A young seal on the beach

== Governance ==
The Christchurch City Council administers Southshore. It is part of the Coastal ward for city council elections. As of 2024, the elected councillor is Celeste Donovan. Nationally, Southshore is part of the Christchurch East parliamentary electorate. As of 2023, the elected member of parliament is Reuben Davidson of the Labour Party. Historically, Christchurch East has supported the Labour Party in general elections and is considered one of Labour's safest seats.

== Demographics ==
Southshore is part of the South New Brighton SA2 statistical area. It covers 1.24 km^{2} (0.48 sq mi).

Historical population
Year	Pop.	±% p.a.
2006	1,395	—
2013	1,137	−2.88%
2018	1,044	−1.69%
2023	1,095	+0.96%

Southshore had a population of 1,095 in the 2023 New Zealand census, an increase of 51 people (4.9%) since the 2018 census, and a decrease of 42 people (−3.7%) since the 2013 census. There were 558 males, 540 females, and 6 people of other genders in 453 dwellings. 4.9% of people identified as LGBTIQ+. There were 183 people (16.7%) aged under 15 years, 162 (14.8%) aged 15 to 29, 528 (48.2%) aged 30 to 64, and 237 (21.6%) aged 65 or older.

People could identify as more than one ethnicity. The results were 93.2% European (Pākehā); 11.5% Māori; 2.5% Pasifika; 3.0% Asian; 0.8% Middle Eastern, Latin American and African New Zealanders (MELAA); and 0.5% other, which includes people giving their ethnicity as "New Zealander". English was spoken by 98.6%, Māori by 2.5%, and other languages by 7.7%. No language could be spoken by 0.8% (e.g. too young to talk). New Zealand Sign Language was known by 0.8%. The percentage of people born overseas was 22.7, compared with 28.8% nationally.

Religious affiliations were 26.0% Christian, 0.5% Hindu, 0.3% Islam, 0.8% New Age, 0.3% Jewish, and 1.6% other religions. People who answered that they had no religion were 62.7%, and 7.4% of people did not answer the census question.

Of those at least 15 years old, 231 (25.3%) people had a bachelor's or higher degree, 531 (58.2%) had a post-high school certificate or diploma, and 168 (18.4%) people exclusively held high school qualifications. 96 people (10.5%) earned over $100,000 compared to 12.1% nationally. The employment status of those at least 15 was 435 (47.7%) full-time, 135 (14.8%) part-time, and 30 (3.3%) unemployed.

Compared to Canterbury region more broadly, Southshore's has higher proportions of European New Zealanders, women and home-owners. Southshore's above-average housing costs, and the coastal setting of the suburb, attracted an older demographic to the area.

== Canterbury earthquakes ==
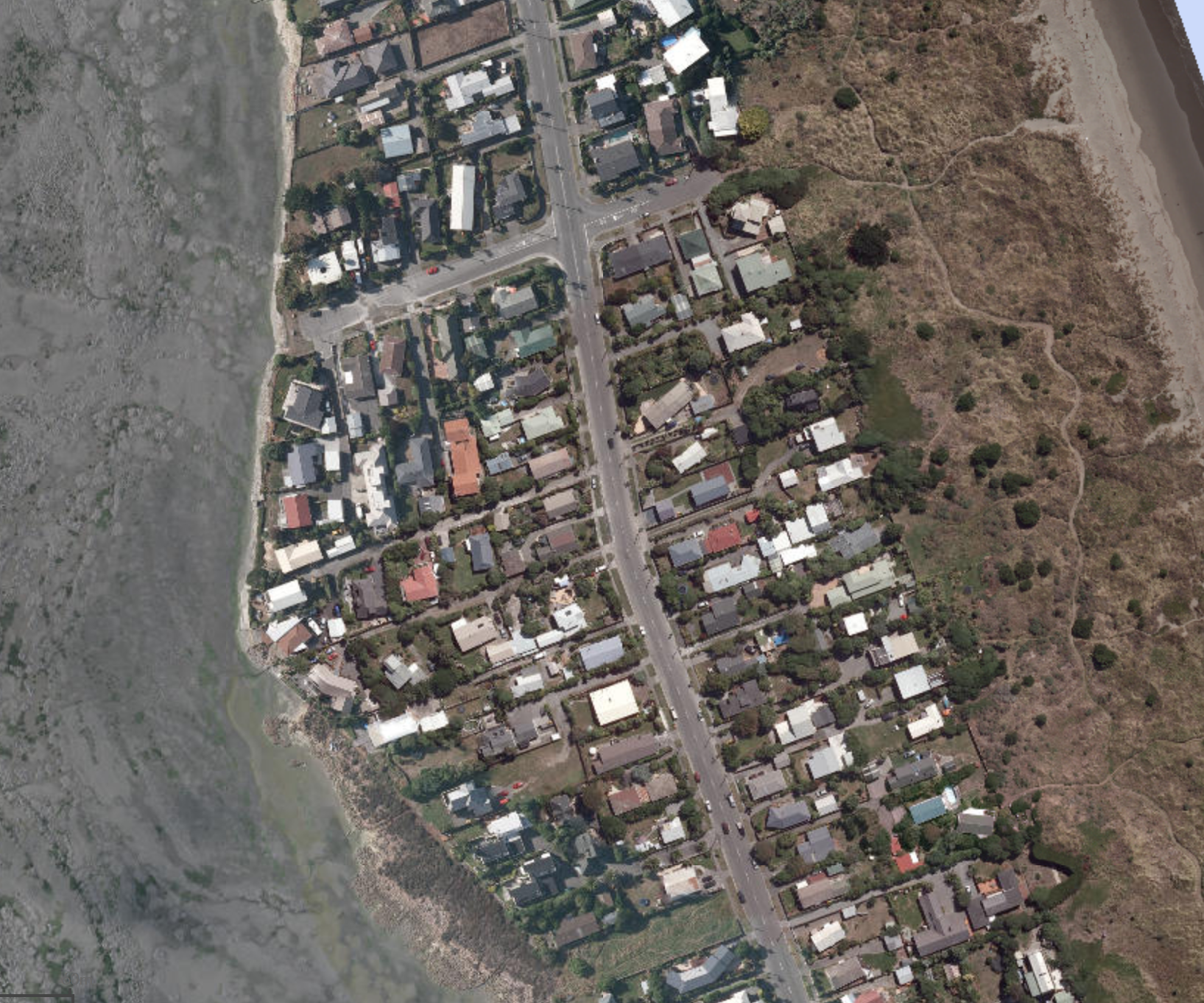
c. 2010–2015

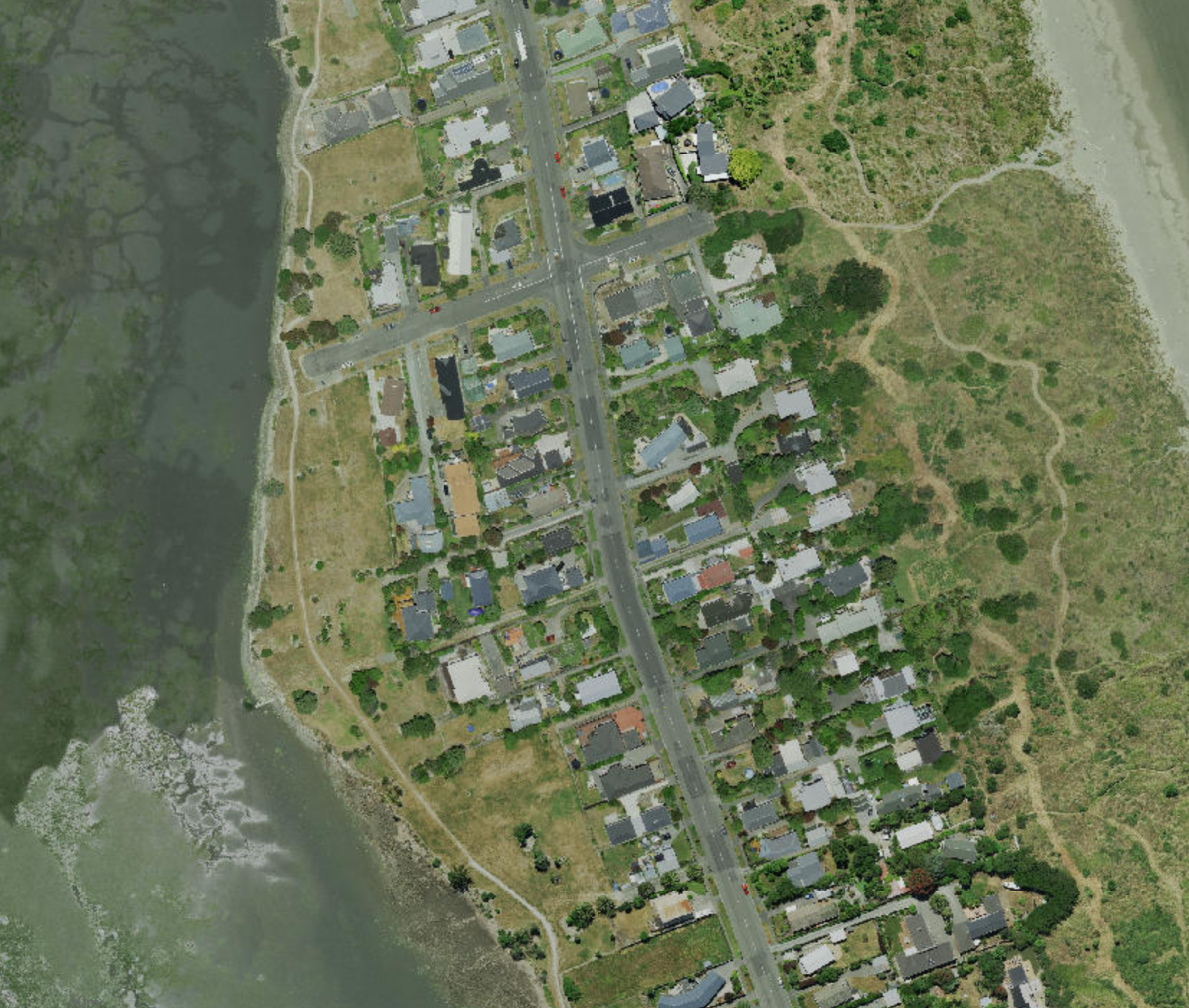
c. present day

Southshore was hit hard by the 4 September 2010 Canterbury and 22 February 2011 Christchurch earthquakes. Damage was caused to houses and land. Southshore was initially put into the orange zone before the beach side was zoned green on 29 October 2011. The estuary side remained in the orange zone awaiting a decision whether it was financially worth repairing and rebuilding on that land due to the extensive damage caused by the two main shakes and aftershocks.

In August 2011, residents were informed that they could expect a land zoning decision within six weeks. Later that month, it was announced that the decision would be released in September. In mid-September, the decision was delayed due to "unexpected complexity". On 12 October, Gerry Brownlee as Earthquake Recovery Minister apologised for the delay and asked for another two weeks of patience. In mid-December, Brownlee stated that a decision would be made "prior to Christmas".

One of the last areas to receive a formal red-zoning decision was Southshore. It was publicly released on 18 May 2012, with 198 of the properties zoned red and the remaining 203 properties allowed to be lived in. Households which were committed to stay in Southshore, tended to disagree with the red-zoning scheme and frequently sought legal advice or geotechnical explanations for its implementation. For other committed stayers, earthquake damage combined with the lack of amenities in the suburb had less impact on their dedication to the community of Southshore. As of 2024 the red-zoned western side of the suburb facing the estuary is an urban green space.

== Transport ==
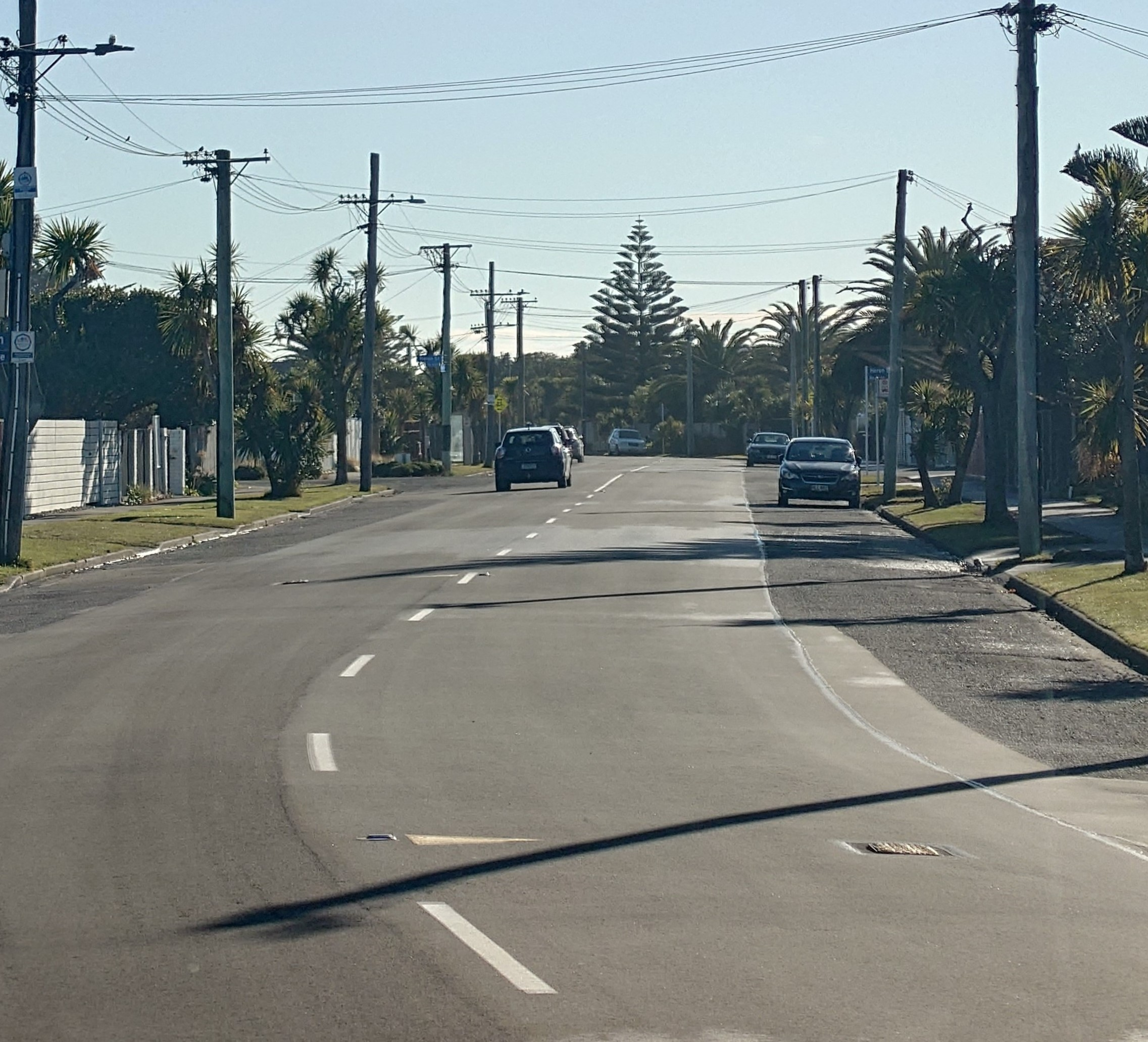
Rocking Horse Road, the suburb's main and only entrance

Historically, Southshore was an important travel route for the Māori. They used the sandspit as a through route between Kaiapoi Pā and the wider Banks Peninsula area. A longstanding aspiration of many people in Christchurch is to build a bridge across the estuary connecting the area of Southshore to Sumner. However, the project has faced several issues. For example, a local farmer grazed livestock at the southern end of the spit before houses were built, and some people denied the bridge builders easy access through their land. Similarly, there was another proposal in 2014 to install a "chain ferry link" across the estuary, but this idea was never finalised.

Since 1939, the suburb's main and only entrance has been Rocking Horse Road. Road access to Southshore was very uneven and overgrown with gorse and lupin. The name reportedly originates from Peter Skellerup, a former deputy-mayor of the city, who drove the road in its early years, describing it to his son as "travelling on a rocking horse" (before it was metalled and levelled). This name was made official in 1949.

A bridge was built in 1926 in South New Brighton. In October 1952, bus services were introduced to the area. A new bridge was later built in 1981. The same year, the bus service extended to the end of Rocking Horse Road.

As of 2024, Southshore's public transport is served by the Hillmorton—Southshore (route 60) bus service operated under the Metro brand. It serves neighbouring suburbs; its final destination is the suburb of Wigram (not Hillmorton) on the opposite edge of the city.

== Notable people ==
Many of the notable people with connections to Southshore are original to the area and have lived there for most of their lives.

- Ivan Mauger, motorcycle speedway rider, once considered to be one of the world's "Greatest Riders"
- Peter Skellerup, industrialist, philanthropist and former deputy-mayor of Christchurch from 1974 to 1980
- Richard Petrie, international cricketer who played 12 One Day Internationals
- Tipene O'Regan, academic and former chairman of the Ngāi Tahu Māori Trust. He vacated the suburb when his section was red-zoned.

== Works cited ==
- Rowlands, Don; Moore, Peter; Osborn, Lee (2006). Sand Dunes to Suburb. Christchurch, New Zealand: Southshore Residents' Association History Group.
- Walsh, Geo. W. (1971). New Brighton : A Regional History 1852–1970. Christchurch, New Zealand: A & C Arts Ltd.
- Penney, Sarah E. W. (1982). The Estuary of Christchurch. Christchurch, New Zealand: Penney Ash Publications.
- Hillier, Lynne (2006). Early European life 1776–1946. Christchurch, New Zealand.
- Comfort, Julie (1995). Lessons From The Past – A History of Coastal Hazards at South Brighton Spit, Christchurch (PDF) (MA (Geography) thesis). University of Canterbury. Archived (PDF) from the original on 19 February 2023.
- Andersen, J.C (2001) [1927]. Place-names of Banks Peninsula: a topographical history. Christchurch, New Zealand: New Zealand Government Printer. ISBN 9781877151774. OCLC 3673007.
- Taylor, W.A (2009) [1952]. Lore and history of the South Island Maori. Christchurch, New Zealand: Bascands. ISBN 9781869643799. OCLC 154645850. Archived from the original on 24 September 2024 – via Victoria University of Wellington.
- Greenhill, Marc (2 May 2012). "Delays cold and callous, say angry orange-zone residents". The Press. p. 1. Archived from the original on 14 September 2024 – via University of Canterbury.
- Beattie, J.H. (1945). Māori place-names of Canterbury: including one thousand hitherto unpublished names collected from Māori sources. Dunedin, New Zealand: Otago Daily Times. OCLC 154196301.
- Owen, S.J. (1992). The Estuary Where Our Rivers Meet the Sea Christchurch's Avon-Heathcote Estuary and Brooklands Lagoon. Christchurch, New Zealand: Christchurch City Council. ISBN 9780473015954.
- Moore Davis, Kyle (10 December 2015). "Brief of evidence of Kyle Moore Davis for Te Rūnanga o Ngāi Tahu and Ngā Rūnanga" (PDF). Te Rūnanga o Ngāi Tahu. Archived (PDF) from the original on 7 February 2016.
- Rice, Geoffrey (2008). Christchurch Changing: An Illustrated History (2nd ed.). Christchurch: Canterbury University Press. ISBN 978-0-908812-53-0.
- Findlay, R. H.; Kirk, R. M. (1 October 1998). "Post‐1847 changes in the Avon‐Heathcote Estuary, Christchurch: A study of the effect of urban development around a tidal estuary". New Zealand Journal of Marine and Freshwater Research. 22. doi:10.1080/00288330.1988.9516283.
- Dickinson, S. (2019). "Alternative narrations and imaginations of disaster recovery: a case study of relocatees after the Christchurch, New Zealand, earthquakes". Social & Cultural Geography. 22. doi:10.1080/14649365.2019.1574883.
