= South New Brighton =

Suburb of Christchurch, New Zealand

- Suburb
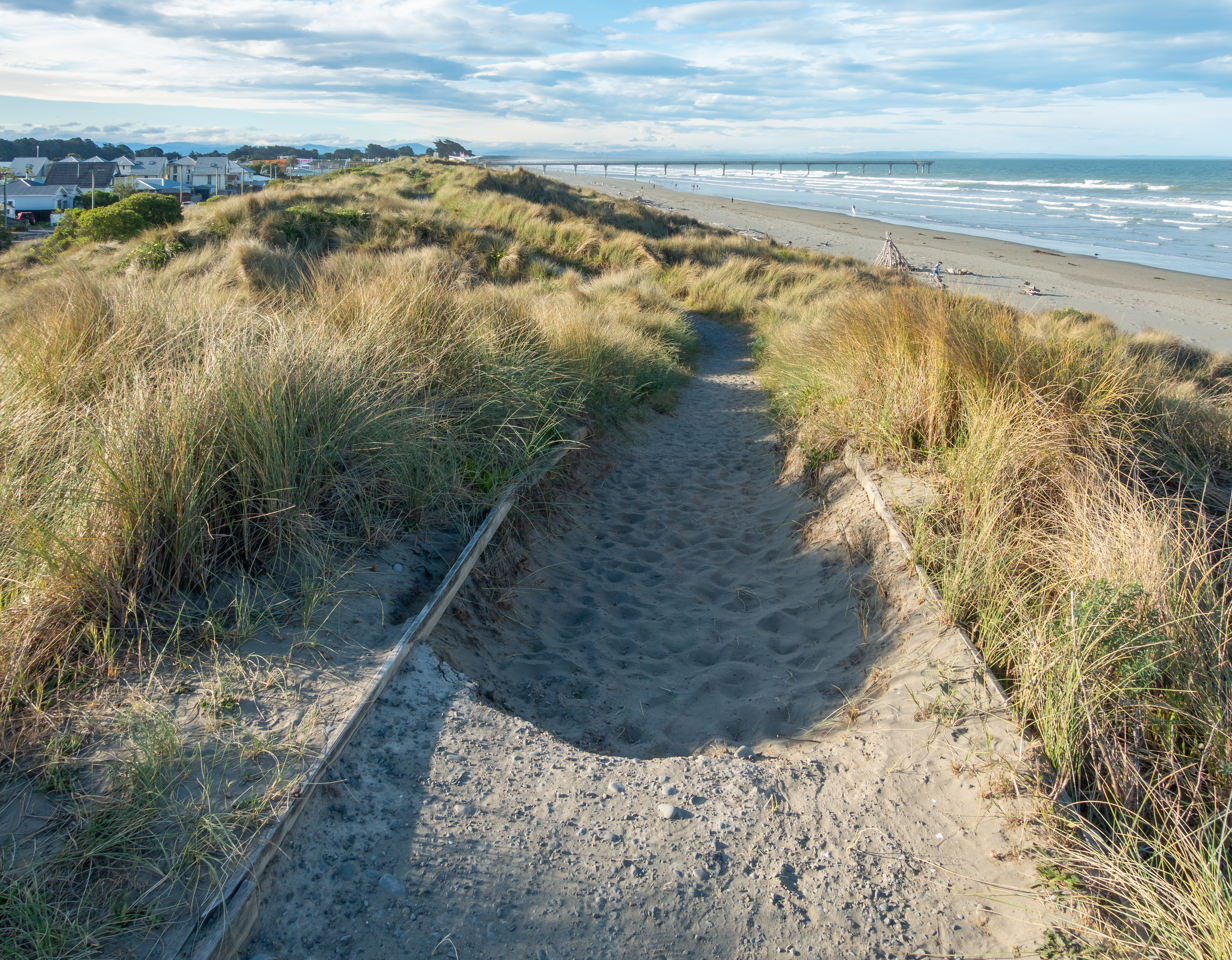
- Path on the dunes on the South New Brighton Beach with the New Brighton Pier in the distance
- Interactive map of South New Brighton
- Coordinates: 43.530°S 172.737°E
- Country: New Zealand
- City: Christchurch
- Local authority: Christchurch City Council
- Electoral ward: Coastal
- Community board: Waitai Coastal-Burwood-Linwood

Area
  - Land: 277 ha (680 acres)

Population (June 2025)
  - Total: 3,420
  - Density: 1,230/km^{2} (3,200/sq mi)

New Brighton		(Pegasus Bay)
	South New Brighton
(Avon Heathcote Estuary)		Southshore

South New Brighton (Māori: Te Kai-a-Te-Karoro) is a coastal suburb on the eastern side of Christchurch city. The area previously had some Māori presence. The suburb also contains a primary school.

== History ==
The Māori name for South New Brighton is Te Kai-a-Te-Karoro. It is suggested that Karoro is both the Māori name for seagulls entirely, and specifically the kelp gull, which is widespread throughout the suburb. There was also a Ngāi Tahu pā (fortified settlement) in South New Brighton which took advantage of the nearby estuary's rich food and resources.

From the late nineteenth century the area was under the control of the New Brighton Borough Council, and early residents were part of the South New Brighton Special Rating Area. The special rating area ran from Rodney Street heading south, bounded by the sea on one side and the Avon River / Ōtākaro on the other. The South Brighton Progress League was established in 1920 to promote and advance the interests of the district, and the league, along with the South New Brighton Burgesses' Association drove much of the development of the district during the tenure of the New Brighton Borough Council. Their work included funding for road formation and extending tram access to the area, promotion for an area school, and promoting the recreational areas, Pleasant Point and the Domain.

Known as South New Brighton since the early 1910s the suburb's name was officially recognised by the Christchurch City Council in 1953, after a suggestion that it be called South Brighton was rejected because there was already Brighton near Dunedin.

South New Brighton Community Centre (transitional facility) opened November 2013 on the site of the demolished community hall following damage in the 2010–2011 earthquakes. The former community hall opened in November 1961 after several years of fundraising by a local committee.

== Demographics ==
The statistical area of South New Brighton, which also includes Southshore, covers 2.77 km^{2} (1.07 sq mi). It had an estimated population of 3,420 as of June 2025, with a population density of 1,235 people per km^{2}.

Historical population
Year	Pop.	±% p.a.
2006	3,645	—
2013	3,228	−1.72%
2018	3,234	+0.04%
2023	3,327	+0.57%

South New Brighton had a population of 3,327 in the 2023 New Zealand census, an increase of 93 people (2.9%) since the 2018 census, and an increase of 99 people (3.1%) since the 2013 census. There were 1,620 males, 1,683 females, and 21 people of other genders in 1,296 dwellings. 5.2% of people identified as LGBTIQ+. The median age was 41.2 years (compared with 38.1 years nationally). There were 636 people (19.1%) aged under 15 years, 513 (15.4%) aged 15 to 29, 1,635 (49.1%) aged 30 to 64, and 543 (16.3%) aged 65 or older.

People could identify as more than one ethnicity. The results were 91.6% European (Pākehā); 15.1% Māori; 3.5% Pasifika; 2.9% Asian; 0.7% Middle Eastern, Latin American and African New Zealanders (MELAA); and 1.9% other, which includes people giving their ethnicity as "New Zealander". English was spoken by 97.7%, Māori by 3.6%, Samoan by 0.5%, and other languages by 8.4%. No language could be spoken by 1.8% (e.g. too young to talk). New Zealand Sign Language was known by 0.8%. The percentage of people born overseas was 20.3, compared with 28.8% nationally.

Religious affiliations were 22.2% Christian, 0.4% Hindu, 0.2% Islam, 0.4% Māori religious beliefs, 0.5% Buddhist, 0.7% New Age, 0.1% Jewish, and 1.4% other religions. People who answered that they had no religion were 67.4%, and 6.7% of people did not answer the census question.

Of those at least 15 years old, 678 (25.2%) people had a bachelor's or higher degree, 1,494 (55.5%) had a post-high school certificate or diploma, and 519 (19.3%) people exclusively held high school qualifications. The median income was $42,400, compared with $41,500 nationally. 258 people (9.6%) earned over $100,000 compared to 12.1% nationally. The employment status of those at least 15 was 1,356 (50.4%) full-time, 405 (15.1%) part-time, and 78 (2.9%) unemployed.

== Education ==
South New Brighton School is a full primary school catering for years 1 to 8. It had a roll of 381 as of July 2026. In 1917, the New Brighton school committee was asked to establish a school in South New Brighton since fifty-four children resided in South New Brighton. A premises near Jellicoe Street was proposed by the committee, however many locals disliked this proposal and suggested the current site closer to the domain. The school opened in 1922.
