= New Brighton Pier =

New Brighton Pier may refer to:

- New Brighton Pier, Christchurch, New Zealand
- New Brighton Pier, Wallasey, England
