= Avon Heathcote Estuary =

Estuary in Christchurch, New Zealand

Estuary of the Heathcote and Avon Rivers / Ihutai
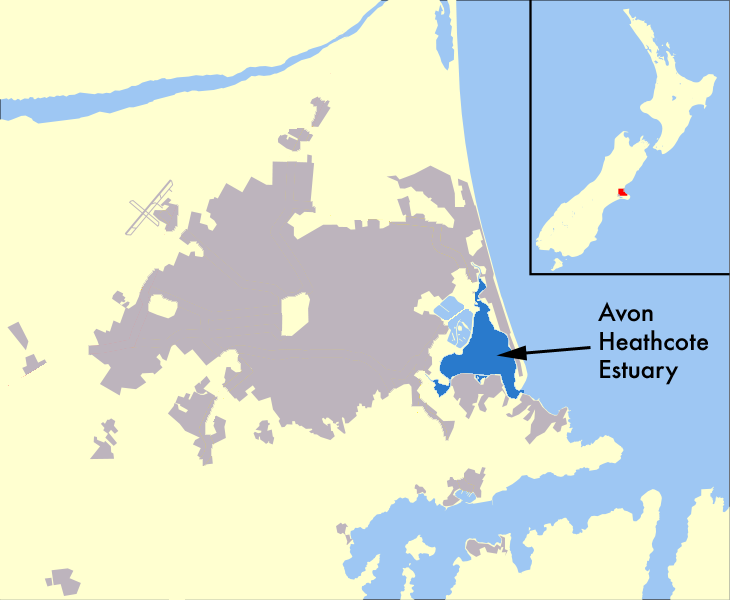
- Christchurch with its estuary

- Location within New Zealand
- Coordinates: 43.547°S 172.723°E
- River sources: Avon River / Ōtākaro; Ōpāwaho / Heathcote River
- Ocean/sea sources: Pacific Ocean
- Basin countries: New Zealand
- Surface area: 8 km^{2} (3.1 mi^{2})
- Settlements: Christchurch

The Estuary of the Heathcote and Avon Rivers / Ihutai is the largest semi-enclosed shallow estuary in Canterbury and remains one of New Zealand's most important coastal wetlands. It is well known as an internationally important habitat for migratory birds, and it is an important recreational playground and educational resource. It was once highly valued for mahinga kai (Māori for food gathering).

== Location ==
The Avon River / Ōtākaro enters the estuary from the northwest, and the Ōpāwaho / Heathcote River from the south-west. The estuary has a triangular shape, a short inlet connection with Pegasus Bay, and is primarily enclosed by the 4-kilometre (2.5 mi) long Brighton Spit, on which the suburbs New Brighton, South New Brighton and Southshore are located.

The most prominent features of the inlet are the single deep channel between Rapanui Rock ("Shag Rock") and Brighton Spit.

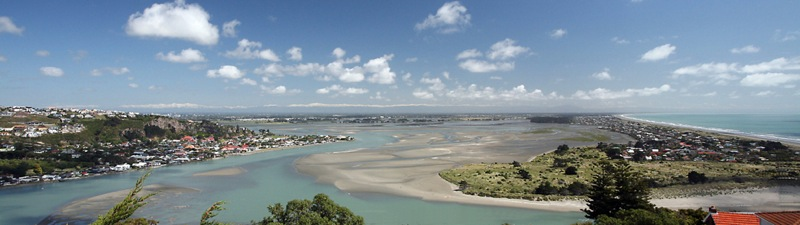
The Avon Heathcote Estuary viewed from Clifton Hill

== Description ==
It is shallow with the mean at high water of ordinary spring tides (HWOST) of 1.4 metres (4.6 ft)—and is predominantly intertidal, as only about 15 percent of the area lies below low water of ordinary spring tides (LWOST).

== Official name ==
The estuary's official name became Estuary of the Heathcote and Avon Rivers / Ihutai as a result of the Ngāi Tahu Claims Settlement Act 1998.

== History ==
=== The Land ===
The Estuary formed around 450 years ago and covers around 880 hectares (3.3 square miles). In 1989 the Canterbury Regional Council and the Christchurch City Council drilled an exploratory bore near the mouth of the Avon River / Ōtākaro discovering layers of fossils and sediment types that showed the area had experienced shifts between being marine, estuary, swamp and floodplain over the last 2 million years. The land underneath the Estuary consists of gravel embedded between fine silts and sands deposited by the rivers and sea. The Brighton Spit which encloses the Estuary was formed by sand carried by the Ashley / Rakahuri and Waimakariri Rivers and as the Spit grew, the mouth of the Avon River / Ōtākaro was forced southward towards that of the Ōpāwaho / Heathcote River, forming the estuary of today.

=== Early Māori settlement ===
Māori people were the first settlers in Canterbury and arrived around the 13th century according to western archaeological evidence, though Māori whakapapa (genealogies) date settlement before this period of time with the discovery of the South Island by Waitaha ancestor, Rākaihautū. Traditional food gathering or mahinga kai sites of Waitaha, Rapuwai, Kāti Mamoe and subsequently Ngāi Tahu iwi included Ihutai (The Estuary). The nearest kāika (settlements) included Ōrua Paeroa at Travis Wetland and Te Kai a Te Karoro pā, which was located near to South New Brighton Park, the latter supporting iwi to reside there throughout each year due to the abundance of food supplied by Ihutai. Traditional food sources around Ihutai included pūtangitangi (Paradise Shelduck), pārera (grey duck), tuna (eels), kanakana (lamprey), īnanga (adult whitebait), pātiki (flounder) and pipi (shellfish). In former times a soft-shelled perwinkle snail called whētiko flourished. In March 1848 Governor George Grey negotiated sale of 20 million acres between Kaiapoi and Otago via the land purchaser Henry Kemp who obtained Māori signatures to a deed of purchase now referred to as Kemp's Purchase or Kemp's Deed. Governor Grey did not uphold all the terms of Kemp's Deed which included a promise to allow access to traditional mahinga kai and kāika nohoanga (seasonal camps) and by the 1850s Māori were barred from access to their mahinga kai sites around the estuary.

=== Early European settlement ===
Sealers and whalers were often valued by Māori who traded flax and potatoes for steel adzes, axes, muskets and other supplies and the Estuary provided an important trading route. In 1837, a whaler named James Robinson Clough also known as Jimmy Robinson married Puawai a local Māori and is said to be the first European to access the Estuary.

== Avon–Heathcote Estuary Ihutai Trust ==
The Avon–Heathcote Estuary Ihutai Trust was formed in 2002. This resulted from requests from the wider community to act in the estuary's long-term interests. The members of the Trust include representatives from the community, existing groups (Friends of the Estuary and the Christchurch Estuary Association), representatives from Christchurch City Council, Environment Canterbury, tāngata whenua and other agencies. As of 2024, the board also includes scientists such as emeritus professor Islay Marsden, and biologist Lesley Bolton-Ritchie.

== Biodiversity ==
In the summer of 2021 to 2022, an invertebrate survey was undertaken by Julia Palmer and a total of 175 different invertebrate species were found to inhabit the Charlesworth Reserve in the Avon-Heathcote Estuary / Ihutai.

== Literature ==
- Owen, S-J. (1992). The Estuary: Where our rivers meet the sea: Christchurch's Avon-Heathcote Estuary and Brooklands Lagoon. Christchurch, New Zealand: Parks Unit, Christchurch City Council.
