= Ecotoxicology and Environmental Safety =

- Discipline: Toxicology, environmental safety
- Language: English
- Edited by: Bing Yan; Richard Handy

Publication details
- History: 1977-present
- Publisher: Elsevier
- Frequency: Semi-monthly
- Open access: Yes
- License: CC-BY-NC 4.0
- Impact factor: 6.2 (2023)

Standard abbreviations
- ISO 4: Ecotoxicol. Environ. Saf.

Indexing
- CODEN: EESADV
- ISSN: 0147-6513 (print); 1090-2414 (web)
- OCLC no.: 03702909

Links
- Journal homepage; Online archive

Ecotoxicology and Environmental Safety is an open-access peer-reviewed scientific journal published by Elsevier. The editors-in-chief are Richard Handy (University of Plymouth) and Bing Yan (Guangzhou University). Established in 1977, the journal has published in open-access since 2021. It has been the official journal of the International Society of Ecotoxicology and Environmental Safety since 1986.

== Abstracting and indexing ==
The journal is abstracted and indexed in:

- Directory of Open Access Journals
- Biological Abstracts
- BIOSIS Previews
- Current Contents/Agriculture, Biology & Environmental Sciences/Life Sciences
- EBSCO databases
- EMBASE
- Essential Science Indicators
- GEOBASE
- MEDLINE (Index Medicus)
- Science Citation Index Expanded
- Scopus
- The Zoological Record

According to the Journal Citation Reports, the journal has a 2023 impact factor of 6.2.

== See also ==
- List of environmental journals
