= Journal of Biological Education =

- Discipline: Science education, biology
- Language: English
- Edited by: Professor Mark Winterbottom

Publication details
- History: 1967-present
- Publisher: Taylor and Francis
- Impact factor: 0.324 (2014)

Standard abbreviations
- ISO 4: J. Biol. Educ.

Indexing
- CODEN: JBIEAO
- ISSN: 0021-9266

Links
- Journal homepage; Online access; Online archive

The Journal of Biological Education is a peer-reviewed academic journal covering research in biology education which is published five times per year. It was established in 1967, is owned by the Royal Society of Biology, and is published by Taylor and Francis. The editor-in-chief is Mark Winterbottom (University of Cambridge). According to the Journal Citation Reports, the journal has a 2023 impact factor of 1.0, and a CiteScore of 3.0.
