= New Brighton, New Zealand =

Coastal suburb of Christchurch, New Zealand

New Brighton
- Suburb
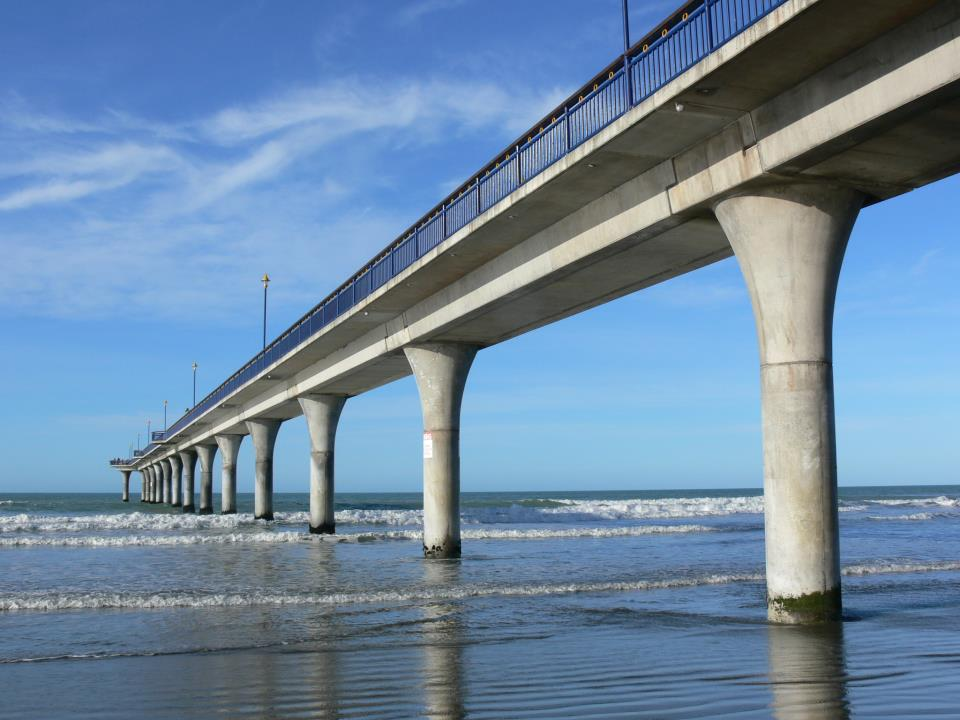
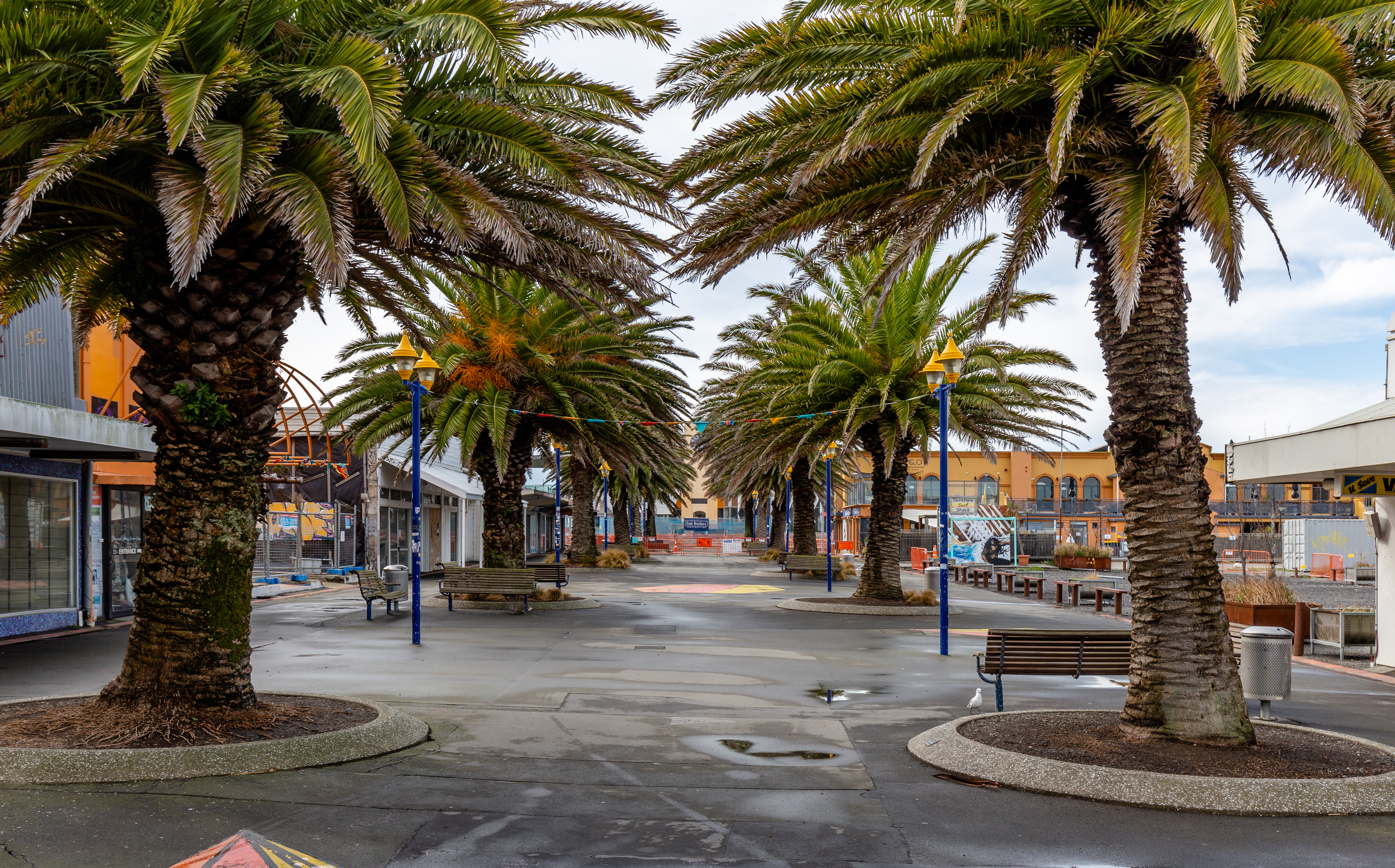
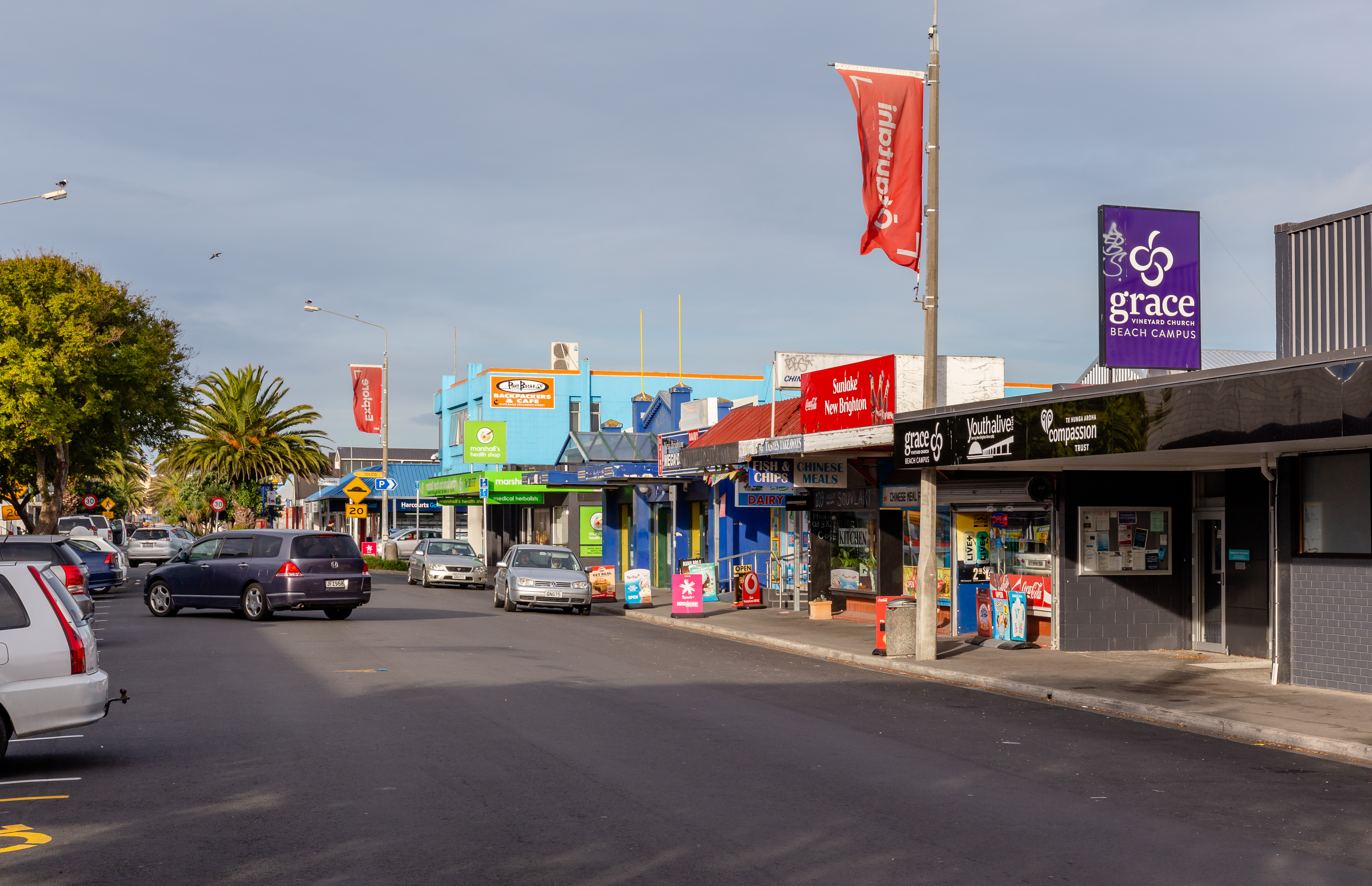
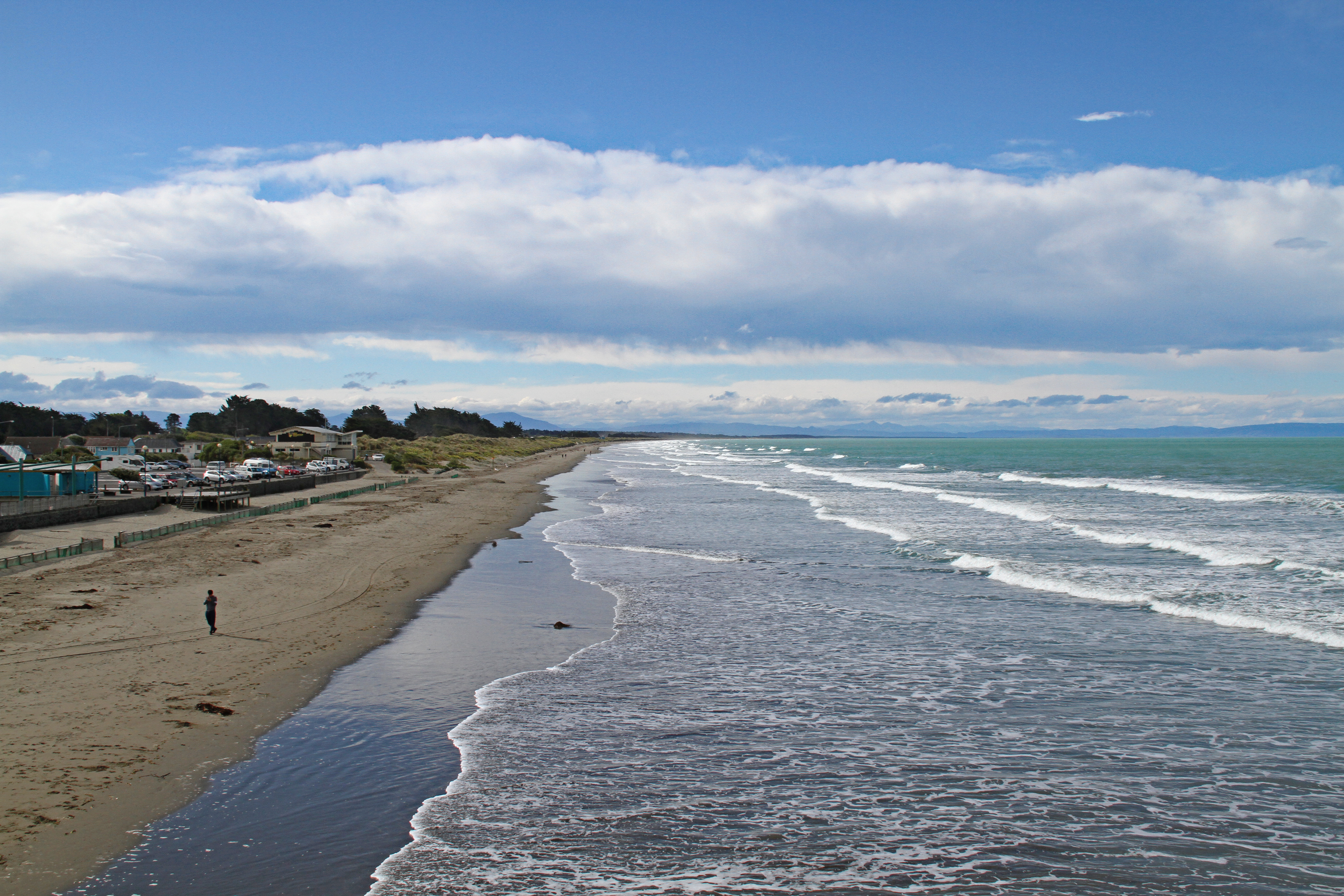
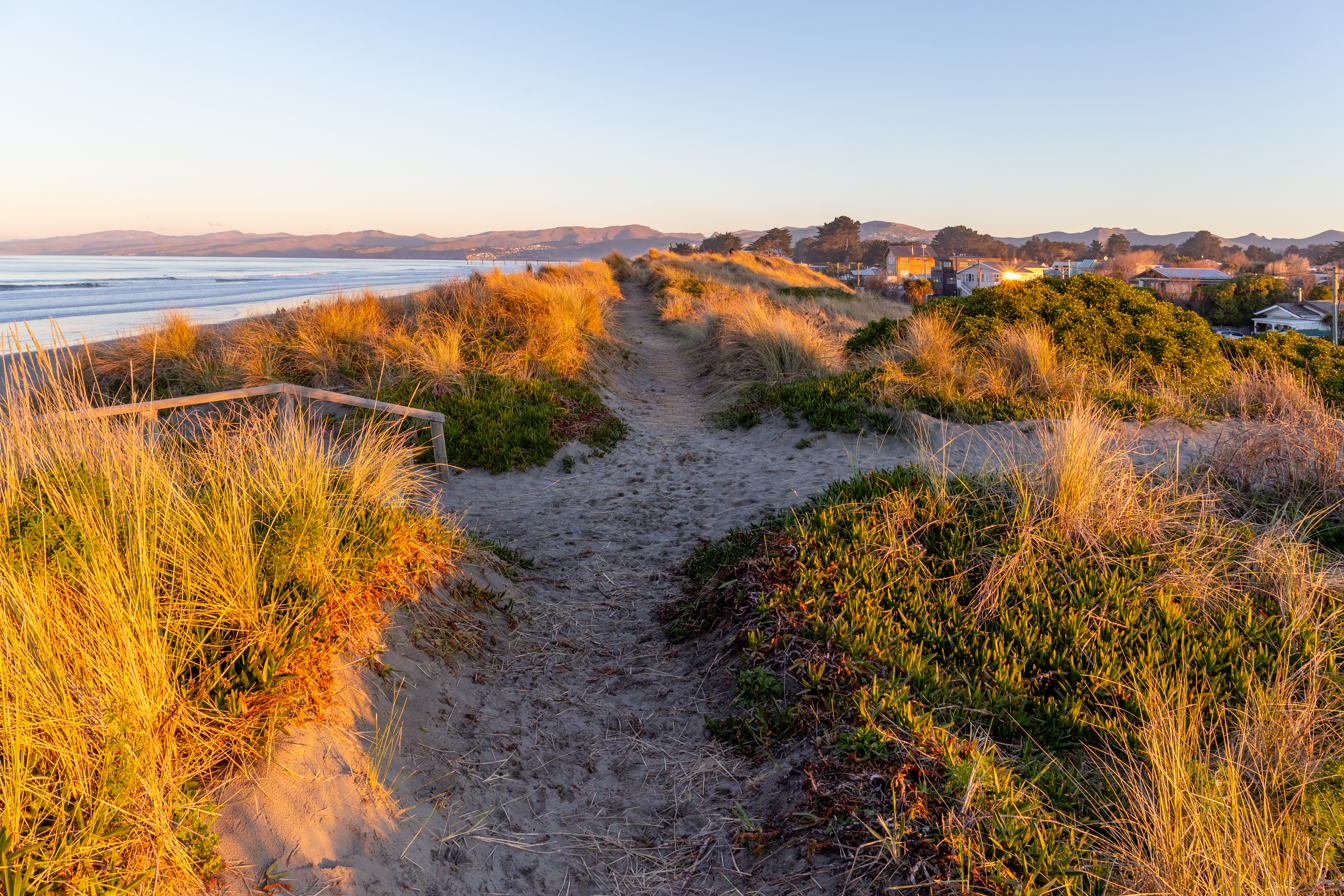
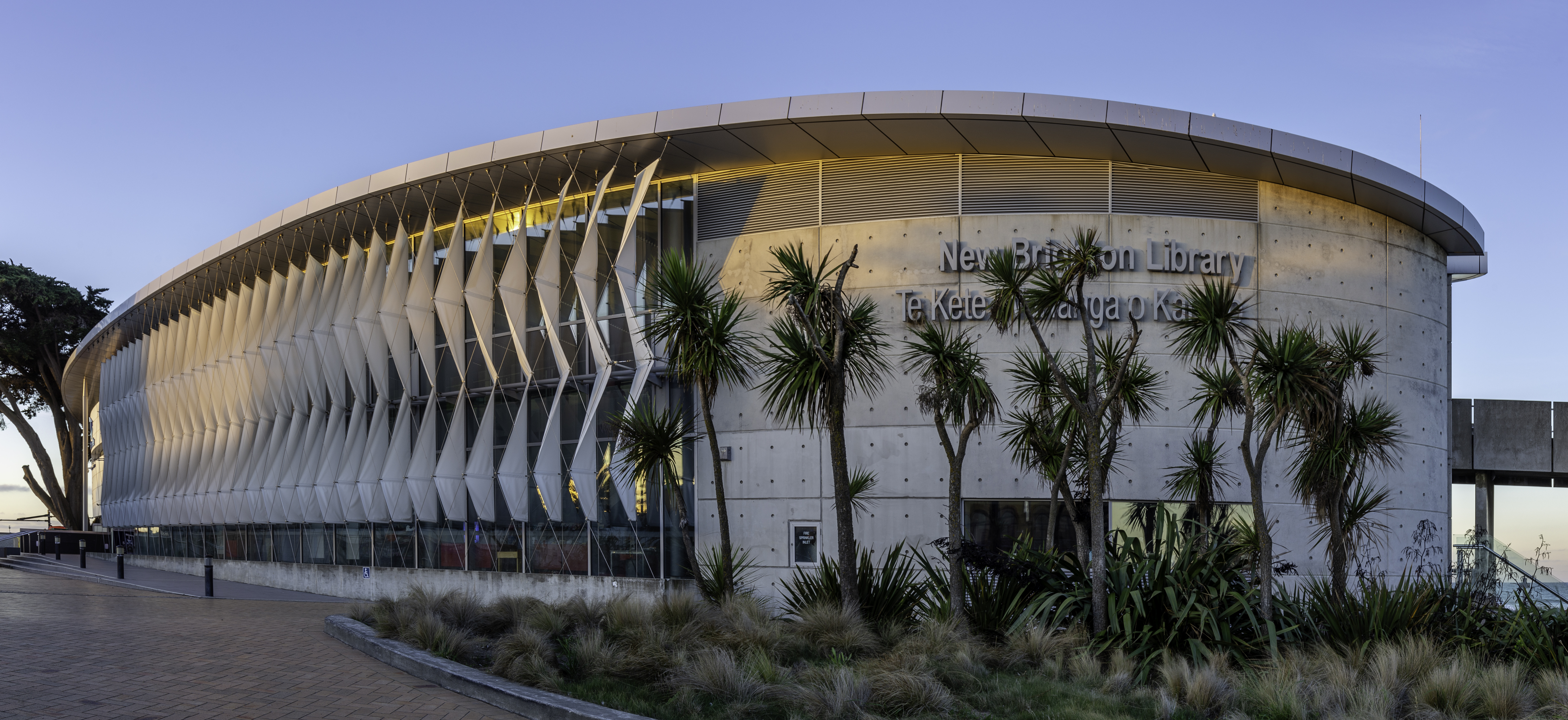
- From the top clockwise: New Brighton Pier, Seaview Road, dune beach walk, New Brighton library, beach view from the pier, Brighton Mall (street)
- Interactive map of New Brighton
- Coordinates: 43.508°S 172.726°E
- Country: New Zealand
- City: Christchurch
- Local authority: Christchurch City Council
- Electoral ward: Coastal
- Community board: Waitai Coastal-Burwood-Linwood

Area
  - Land: 370 ha (910 acres)

Population (June 2025)
  - Total: 6,510
  - Density: 1,800/km^{2} (4,600/sq mi)

North New Brighton
(Residential red zone)	New Brighton	(Pegasus Bay)
Bromley	(Avon Heathcote Estuary)	South New Brighton

New Brighton is a coastal suburb of Christchurch, New Zealand, 8 kilometres (5.0 mi) east of the city centre. It is one of eastern Christchurch's main entertainment and tourist centres. The 2011 Christchurch earthquakes caused significant damage in the area.

== History ==
=== Māori connections ===
New Brighton is of cultural significance for the local iwi or tribe Ngāi Tahu who are the kaitiaki (guardians) of this takiwā (or area). Ngāi Tūāhuriri hapū, a sub-tribe of Ngāi Tahu, hold mana whenua status (territorial rights) in respect to this area. Te Tai o Mahaanui refers to the coast and surrounding land of which New Brighton is a part.

=== Naming ===
The naming of New Brighton was apparently done on the 'spur of the moment' by William Free, an early settler of the area. When Guise Brittan, the Waste Lands Commissioner, visited the area in December 1860, he was recognised and Free chalked 'New Brighton' on a wooden plank, supposedly in reference to his fellow settler Stephen Brooker, who had come from Brighton in England. The suburb is frequently referred to simply as Brighton, occasionally leading to confusion with Brighton near Dunedin.

=== Early settlement ===
Māori people were the first settlers in Canterbury and arrived around the 13th century according to western archaeological evidence, though Māori whakapapa (genealogies) date settlement before this period of time with the discovery of the South Island by Waitaha ancestor, Rākaihautū. Traditional food gathering or mahinga kai sites of Waitaha, Rapuwai, Kāti Mamoe and subsequently Ngāi Tahu iwi included Ihutai (Avon Heathcote Estuary) nearby to New Brighton. Walking trails between Ngāi Tahu settlements (kāika) passed close to New Brighton's present day commercial centre. A sand dune track called Pohoareare ran around Ihutai between Ōpāwaho kāika (settlement) on the Heathcote River and South New Brighton, a popular iwi destination for swimming and catching horihori (sole).

The first English settler's home in the area was built in the 1850s by William Walker in Herring Bay Ihutai Avon Heathcote Estuary (South New Brighton). From 1860 on, increasingly more settlers started to be interested in New Brighton. The first settlers built their houses from mānuka scrub and clay. These cob and sod houses were quite simple with one big room which was partitioned later, weatherboards on the outside walls, beaten clay floor and an oil drum for cooking purposes. Beside the lack of infrastructure, the first settlers had to deal with the nature of the area which consisted of sand dunes with nearly no vegetation. Strong winds could deposit a foot of sand on the first improvised New Brighton roads. Shifting sand was managed by vegetation planting. After a lot of trial and error during which many grass types were planted, it was decided that lupins and marram-grass were the best for stabilising the sand dunes. By 1899, officials had planted a ton of marram-grass.

One of the first businessmen who saw potential in New Brighton was English settler Joseph Harrop Hopkins. On 7 November 1872, Hopkins purchased 150 acres for £300. Within two years, Hopkins built a boarding house and a hotel. After approval from the Licensing Authority on 28 April 1874, the hotel was named "New Brighton". In order to attract new visitors to the area and provide a comfortable and attractive mode of transport, Hopkins purchased an expensive 170-passenger paddle steamer which run daily from central Christchurch (Wards Brewery) to New Brighton. However the steamer didn't attract as much attention as desired and Hopkins fell into financial troubles. In 1875, he had to sell the steamer and his land.

Another person who played a prominent part in the development of the 'Beach' settlement in its early days was George Thomas Hawker (1840–1924) nicknamed "The Father of New Brighton". He arrived from England to Lyttelton in 1865 and operated a bakery in Caledonian Road. He moved to the Beach district in 1869 opening a bakery. Mr Hawker had great faith that the area would become a great seaside resort building one of the first houses on Seaview Road. He bought a lot of land in New Brighton and Bexley area (naming it after Bexley, Kent, England). He owned donkeys for beach rides and belonged to the Pleasant Point Boat Club, New Brighton Library Committee, Rifle Club and Commodore of the local Power Boat Club. As a New Brighton Borough Councillor, in 1907 he moved to rename many of the local streets to what they are now. His Great Grandson Wayne Hawker remembers that he gave land for Central New Brighton Primary School as the Government was trying to get it to be part of the local Church.

Early development of the area was slow. By 1884, according to official records, only 16 houses were present. From 1885, a gradual increase in the number of houses occurred, roads and streets were planned, and the first shops appeared. Development accelerated in the following years. The area used be known simply as the "Beach", which was part of the Avon River Road Board District. As the development continued, the area became a borough in 1897. By 1901, New Brighton reached 1,008 residents. This number further increased to around 4,000 by 1922. In 1941 the borough was annexed by Christchurch City.

== Transportation ==
Before the first roads were built, it was challenging to get to the area. New Brighton was originally separated from the then outer suburbs of Christchurch by the swampy areas adjoining the Avon River / Ōtākaro. Later on, urban expansion, land reclamation and drainage led to New Brighton being connected to Christchurch city. The first English settlers carried goods to and from New Brighton on a galvanised cart drawn by an ox. Mānuka scrub was frequently used as a ground cover to prevent the cart from being bogged. The first road to New Brighton followed the Avon River / Ōtākaro. In 1874, the poor quality of the roading, due to the moving sands of the area, led to the matter being brought to the urgent attention of the Superintendent of the Canterbury Provincial Council, in order to secure funding to improve the roads. Maintenance and improvement of the area's roading was affected by the borough's income. From 1897, a water cart was used on dirt roads, and in 1896 gravel began to be laid on some of the roads.

=== Early public transport ===
In 1861, the first commercial coach service commenced, and from 1872, there were daily coach services from Christchurch which attracted more settlement in the area including boarding houses, baches (holiday homes) and permanent houses.

=== Trams ===
Trams were first introduced to Christchurch thanks to the Canterbury Tramway Company, which was founded in 1878. The first tram services commenced in central Christchurch in 1880, with the tramway system consisting of several lines and stations. Buoyed by its success, the New Brighton Tramway Company was formed in 1885 with the purpose of providing a tram connection from the eastern end of the central Christchurch tramway network, at Linwood, out to New Brighton. Construction of the line, which followed Pages Road, commenced in 1887 and was completed early the following year, with fare-paying services commencing on 15 February 1888. The service proved to be popular, garnering between 3,000 and 5,000 passengers per week. A second tram route, which became known as the North Beach tramline, was constructed by the City and Suburban Tramway Company, passing through Linwood, Avonside, Shirley, Avondale, Rawhiti, before ending at the New Brighton Pier, was completed in 1894.

In this era, the trams on both routes were horse-drawn. It was only with the formation of the Christchurch Tramway Board in 1905 and which took over the assets of the local tramway companies, that steam engines were introduced to the New Brighton lines. Electrification of the New Brighton tramway lines was completed in August 1906.

=== Trolley buses ===
Over time, the North Beach route proved uneconomic, mainly due to the poor state of the track not enabling the trams to compete with the private Inter City Motors' buses which ran along the same route. The tramline was closed in 1931, with a new electric trolley bus service commencing in its place. The bus company was eventually purchased by the board in 1935, allowing the Board to have a monopoly on that route.

The fate of the main New Brighton tramway line followed that of the economy. The Great Depression of the 1930s caused a decline in patronage, but increased during World War II due to the restrictions placed on other forms of motorised transport. By the late 1940s, the growth of the Christchurch urban and suburban areas, along with increased rates of car ownership meant that the trams were no longer the best mode for public transport. In a process lasting from 1947 to 1951, the Christchurch Transport Board made a series of decisions to phase out the trams, and replace them with diesel-powered buses.

=== Buses ===
The transition away from trams proceeded apace in 1951 when the Christchurch Tramway Board ordered 57 diesel buses, with their routes following that of the former tram and trolley bus network. The Christchurch-New Brighton line was closed down on 18 October 1952. The 5 Brighton bus route, following the same route along Pages Road, commenced the same day. The use of buses allowed other routes to be incorporated into public transport network; these included 5A Aldwins Road, 5B Breezes Road, and 5S South Brighton. The 10 Marshland Road and Richmond bus service, which fed into the North Beach route, commenced on 31 May 1956. The 19 North Beach bus service, which followed what had been the North Beach tram, and then trolley bus, route, commenced on 8 November 1956.

In 1984, two new services, the 30 & 31 Seaside Specials were started to bring people from the southern and northern suburbs, respectively, to New Brighton on Saturdays for shopping. With the introduction of weekend trading, the demand for these services wained, and the buses were discontinued.

As of 2024, New Brighton is serviced by the following bus routes, all operated under the Metro brand:

#	Route Name	Start	Major destinations	End	Notes
5	Rolleston/New Brighton	The Hub Hornby or Rolleston via Templeton	Church Corner, Riccarton Mall, Christchurch Hospital, Bus Interchange, Fitzgerald Avenue, Eastgate Mall	New Brighton	
5x	Rolleston/New Brighton	Rolleston	Templeton, Hornby Hub, Church Corner, Riccarton Mall, Christchurch Hospital, Bus Interchange	Ara Institute	Weekdays only
60	Hillmorton – Southshore	Wigram	Aidanfield, Hillmorton, Barrington Mall, Christchurch Hospital, Bus Interchange, The Palms Mall, Travis Road, New Brighton	Southshore	
135	New Brighton – The Palms	New Brighton	New Brighton, Taiora QE II, Burwood Hospital, Prestons, The Palms	The Palms	No Sunday service

== Christchurch earthquakes aftermath ==
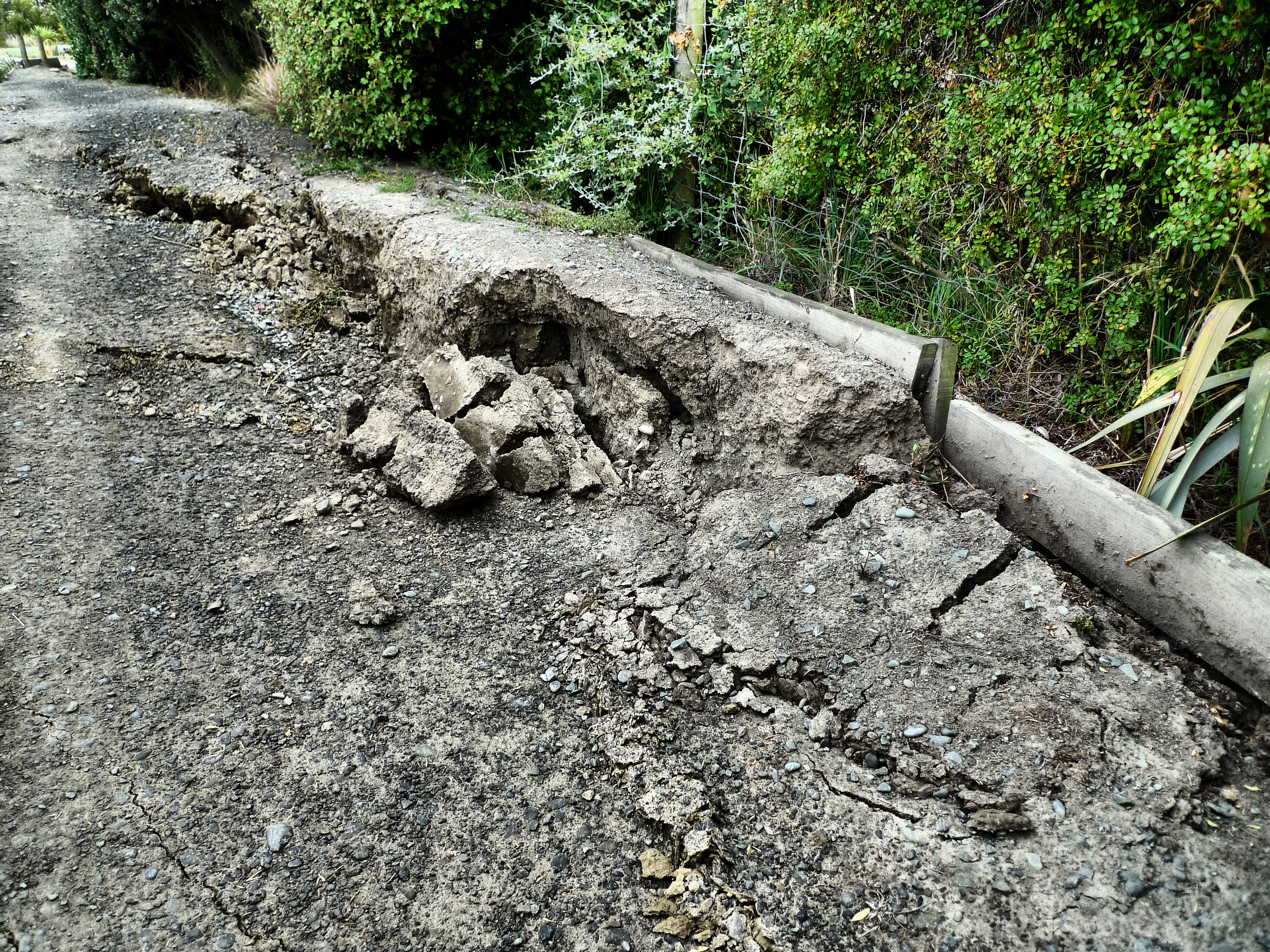
Earthquake damage in South New Brighton

Due in part to the ground on which it was built, the consequences for New Brighton of the 2011 earthquake did not only relate to building damage.

In December 2012, residents held a protest against the perceived slow progress of rebuilding in the area following the region's damaging earthquakes, in which 80 people bared their bottoms.

New Brighton was named to be the host of the finish of the annual Coast to Coast multisport race in February 2015. The previous finishing point of the race was in Sumner.

Redevelopment of the town centre after the earthquakes based on the New Brighton Centre Master Plan has commenced with He Puna Taimoana hot pools opening, alongside beachside playground, Marine Parade and streetscape enhancements.

== Location ==
The suburb is divided into three sections spread along the southern coast of Pegasus Bay: North New Brighton; New Brighton; and South New Brighton, which lies at the northern end of a narrow peninsula between the bay and the Avon Heathcote Estuary. A 300 metres (980 ft) pier was built here in the 1990s, and opened on 1 November 1997.

New Brighton was originally a distinct coastal village, separated from the then outer suburbs of Christchurch by the swampy areas adjoining the Avon River. However, urban expansion, land reclamation and drainage have led to New Brighton being connected to Christchurch city.

== Demographics ==
New Brighton covers 3.70 km^{2} (1.43 sq mi). It had an estimated population of 6,510 as of June 2025, with a population density of 1,759 people per km^{2}.

Historical population
Year	Pop.	±% p.a.
2006	6,597	—
2013	5,946	−1.47%
2018	6,099	+0.51%
2023	6,180	+0.26%

New Brighton had a population of 6,180 in the 2023 New Zealand census, an increase of 81 people (1.3%) since the 2018 census, and an increase of 234 people (3.9%) since the 2013 census. There were 3,009 males, 3,135 females, and 30 people of other genders in 2,682 dwellings. 5.2% of people identified as LGBTIQ+. There were 1,113 people (18.0%) aged under 15 years, 1,080 (17.5%) aged 15 to 29, 3,000 (48.5%) aged 30 to 64, and 990 (16.0%) aged 65 or older.

People could identify as more than one ethnicity. The results were 88.0% European (Pākehā); 16.7% Māori; 5.0% Pasifika; 4.4% Asian; 1.1% Middle Eastern, Latin American and African New Zealanders (MELAA); and 2.3% other, which includes people giving their ethnicity as "New Zealander". English was spoken by 97.5%, Māori by 4.3%, Samoan by 1.1%, and other languages by 8.3%. No language could be spoken by 1.8% (e.g. too young to talk). New Zealand Sign Language was known by 1.0%. The percentage of people born overseas was 19.6, compared with 28.8% nationally.

Religious affiliations were 24.2% Christian, 0.7% Hindu, 0.2% Islam, 1.1% Māori religious beliefs, 0.3% Buddhist, 0.9% New Age, and 1.5% other religions. People who answered that they had no religion were 63.9%, and 7.6% of people did not answer the census question.

Of those at least 15 years old, 1,023 (20.2%) people had a bachelor's or higher degree, 2,766 (54.6%) had a post-high school certificate or diploma, and 1,278 (25.2%) people exclusively held high school qualifications. 312 people (6.2%) earned over $100,000 compared to 12.1% nationally. The employment status of those at least 15 was 2,478 (48.9%) full-time, 750 (14.8%) part-time, and 141 (2.8%) unemployed.

Individual statistical areas
Name	Area (km^{2})	Population	Density (per km^{2})	Dwellings	Median age	Median income
Rawhiti	1.94	3,024	1,559	1,251	37.1 years	$35,500
New Brighton	1.76	3,156	1,793	1,431	41.6 years	$37,500
New Zealand					38.1 years	$41,500

== Economy ==
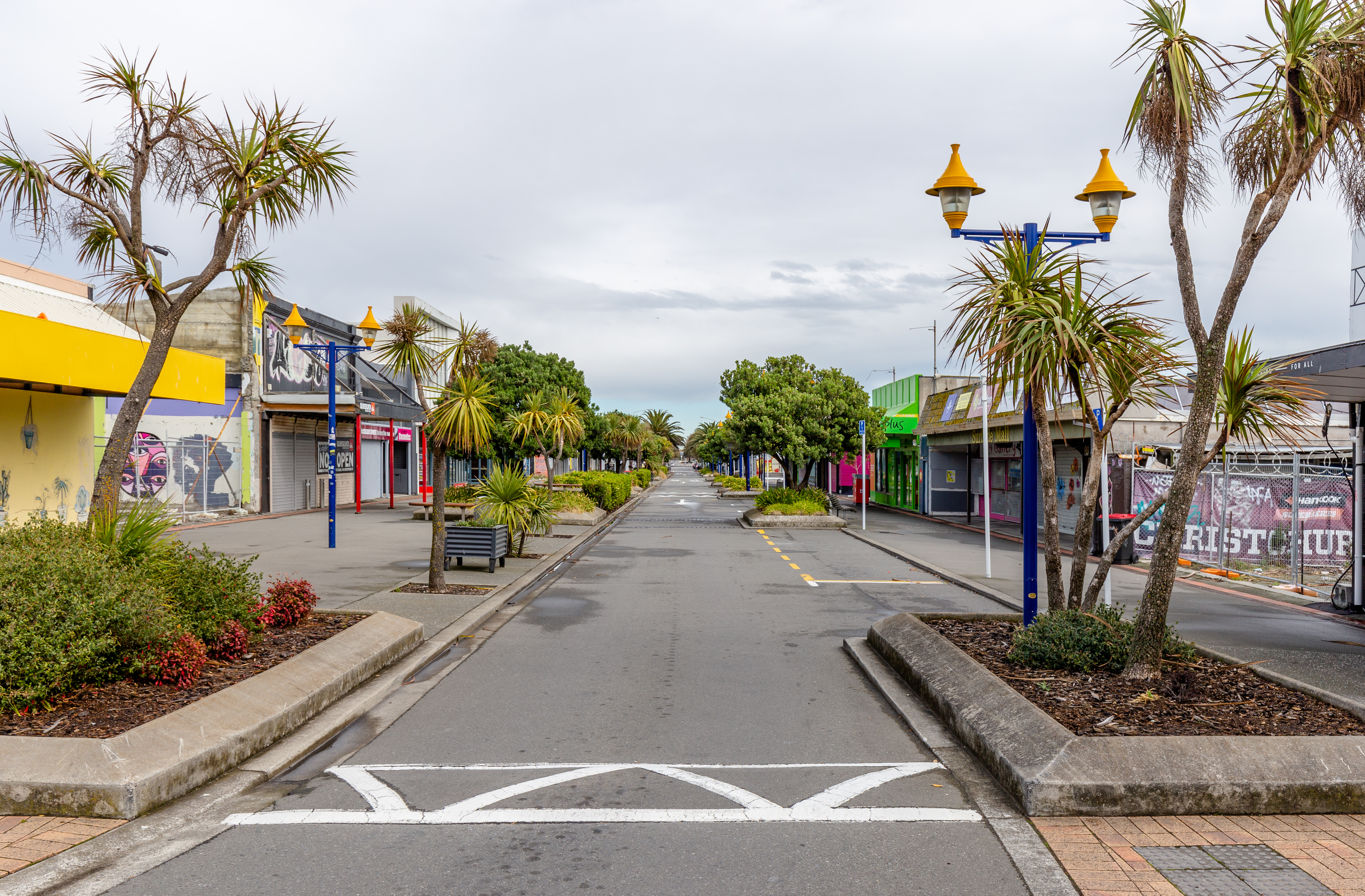
Brighton Mall

For several decades, New Brighton had the distinction of being the only place in Christchurch where general retail shops were permitted to open on Saturdays (remaining closed on Mondays), and the business district thrived as a result. With the introduction of nationwide Saturday trading in 1980, and then seven-day trading in 1990, retail activity declined significantly.

The 2011 Christchurch earthquake compounded New Brighton's struggle for economic wellbeing creating vacant derelict sites in its main retail centre. As part of the New Brighton Regeneration Project, the Beachside Playground has been upgraded and He Puna Taimoana saltwater hot pools built.

Housing projects are planned by a range of developers including Williams Corporation who sold 37 townhouses situated in 180 Marine Parade within 24 hours in March 2022 and The Home Foundation who are building over 60 terraced homes in a development called Te Pakau Maru on Beresford Street. Paradigm Group are planning a mix of ground floor retail with 16 upstairs apartments at the vacant site of 101 Brighton Mall.

== Landmarks ==
=== New Brighton Pier ===
On 18 January 1894, the first New Brighton pier was opened by the Governor of New Zealand, the Earl of Glasgow. In his opening speech, the Earl said:

No doubt for a health resort, as New Brighton ought to be, it would be a great advantage. It would give the people the benefit of a beautiful view along the coast and a promenade which would be better than the sandy beach. New Brighton was to be commended for erecting the pier, and he hoped it would be a great success and assist to make New Brighton what it ought to be – one of the best health resorts in the colony.

— The Governor of New Zealand, The Earl of Glasgow, New Brighton Pier opening speech (25 May 1861)

The 180 m (590 ft) long timber structure took three years to build and its opening was a significant achievement in promoting New Brighton as a health and recreational resort. Some commentators believe that this potential of New Brighton as a recreational and health resort similar to English New Brighton has not been realised, possibly because of its prevalent harsh winds, poor soils and the somewhat shabby image of the suburb. The pier stood until 1965 when it was demolished as the run down structure wasn't deemed safe by the City Council.

A new 300 m (980 ft) long concrete pier was constructed and opened on 1 November 1997. In 1999, a library and cafe building was erected at the pier's base. The building received awards from New Zealand Institute of Architects. The pier was closed for earthquake repairs in 2016 and reopened again in May 2018.

=== St Faith's Anglican church ===
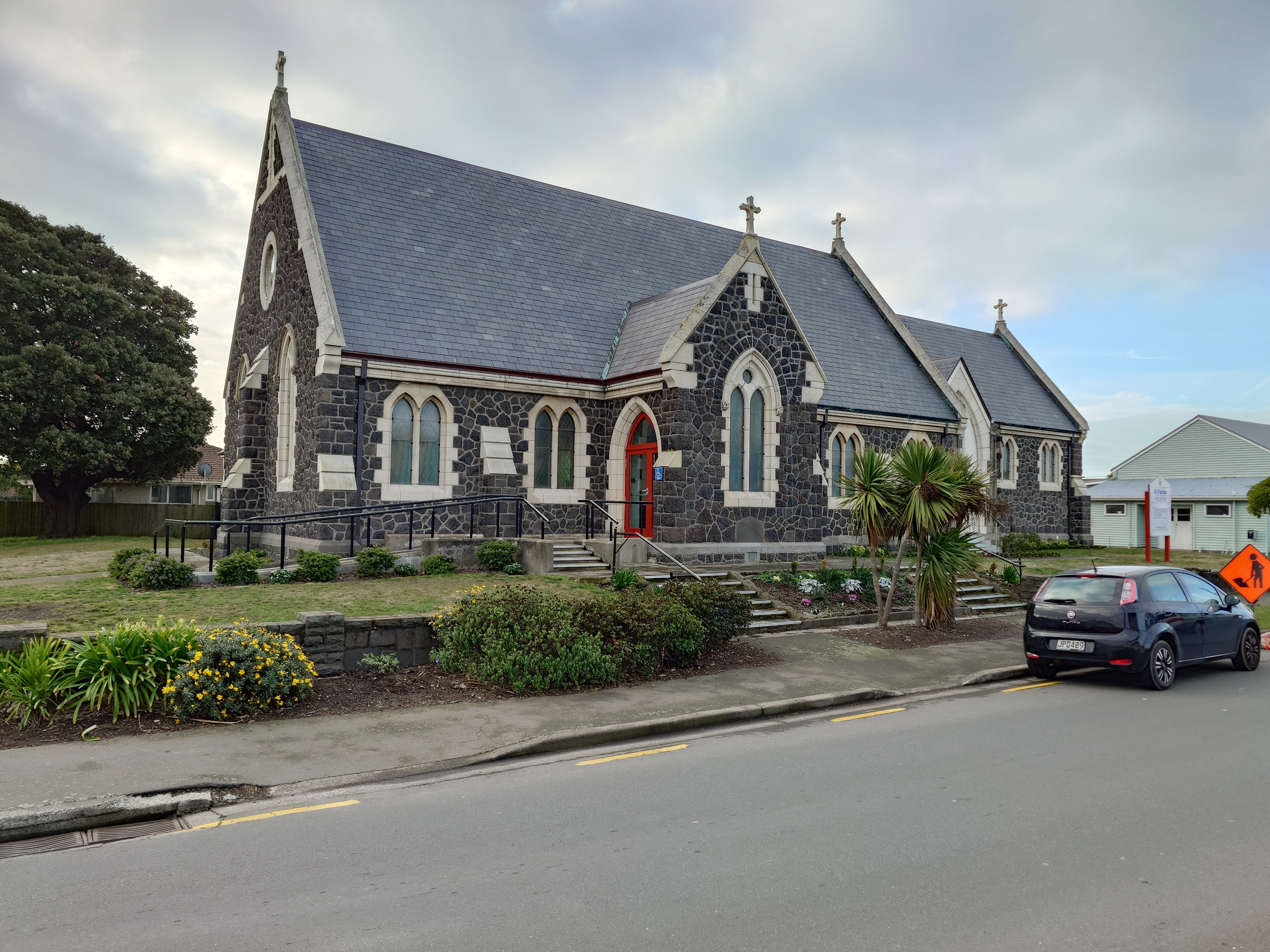
St Faiths Anglican Church, New Brighton (2024)

St Faith's is an Anglican church located on Hawke street. The original wooden church was built in 1886 and enlarged in 1909. The present church was built between 1924 and 1925. It was constructed using Port Hills’ basalt, a slate roof and Oamaru stone dressings and linings. It was badly damaged in the 2010/11 Christchurch earthquakes. After work to restore and strengthen the church building, it was reopened in May 2022.

=== He Puna Taimoana Hot Pools ===
Developed for $19.2m and opening in April 2020, the hot pools have five outdoor pools for year-round use, as well as a café, sauna and steam room. The name, translated as “coastal pools” or “seaside pools”, reflects the location of the pools and surrounding environment, and was gifted by Te Rūnanga o Ngāi Tūāhuririri and Matapopore. In March 2024, the complex welcomed its 500,000th visitor.

== Education ==
There were no schools in the New Brighton district up until 1889, the nearest school was located 2 miles away in Burwood. At present time, New Brighton contains no secondary schools. The nearest secondary schools are situated side by side being Shirley Boys' High School and Avonside Girls' High School in the suburb of North New Brighton. New Brighton contains three primary schools:

- New Brighton Catholic School: a state-integrated full primary school for years 1 to 8, established in 1935. It had a roll of 195 as of July 2026.
- Nova Montessori School: a private full primary school for years 1 to 8, established in 1988. It had a roll of 38 as of July 2026.
- Rāwhiti School: a state full primary school for years 1 to 8, opened in January 2015 as the result of a merger of Central New Brighton, Freeville, and North New Brighton schools. It had a roll of 520 as of July 2026.

The suburb also has a number of kindergarten and childcare facilities, including New Brighton Community Preschool and Nursery.

== Sport and recreation ==
Rāwhiti Domain is the main sports field in the suburb, and has facilities for the Rawhiti Golf Club, New Brighton Rugby Football Club, New Brighton Cricket Club, and the New Brighton Olympic Athletic Club. The suburb also has a bowling club, located at the Returned Services' Association building.

The New Brighton Surf Bathing and Life Saving Club is the oldest surf life saving club in New Zealand, having been established in July 1910.

== Cited works ==
- Morrison, J. P. (1948). The Evolution of a City. Christchurch, New Zealand: Christchurch City Council.
- Owen, S-J. (1992). The Estuary: Where our rivers meet the sea: Christchurch's Avon-Heathcote Estuary and Brooklands Lagoon. Christchurch, New Zealand: Parks Unit, Christchurch City Council.
- Walsh, Geo. W. (1971). New Brighton : A Regional History. Christchurch: A & C Arts Ltd.
