= Rapanui Rock =

Island in New Zealand

Coordinates: 43.5631°S 172.7505°E

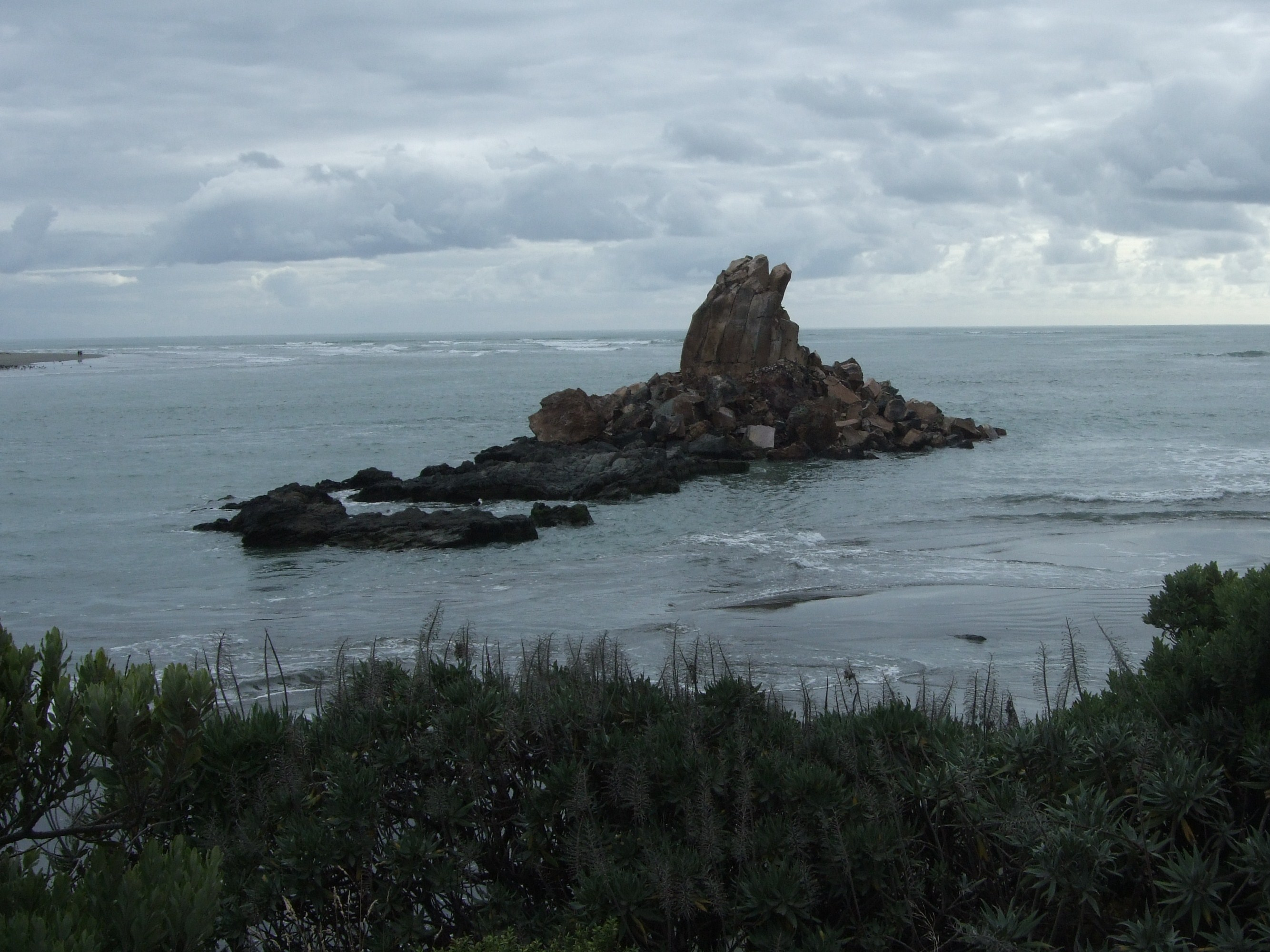
Rapanui (Shag Rock) after the 22 February 2011 earthquake.

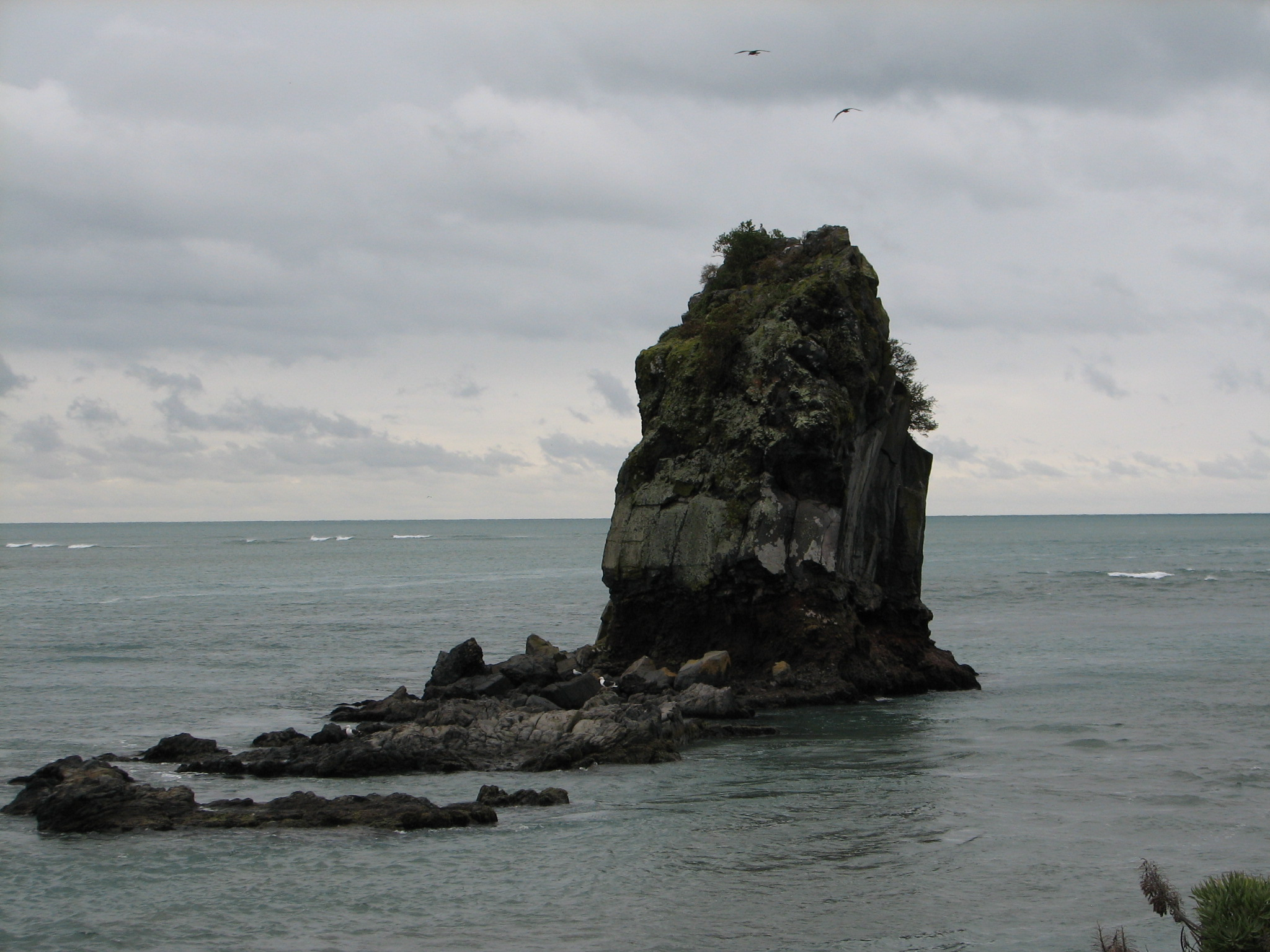
Rapanui (Shag Rock). Before the 2011 earthquakes

Shag Rock (also known as Rapanui) is a sea stack that marks the entrance of the Avon Heathcote Estuary near Christchurch, New Zealand. It is a prominent landmark for navigators at sea as well as travelers on the road to Sumner. The rock stands close to the southern shore just above the low tide level. In the February 2011 Christchurch earthquake it shattered and the remains, which are still easily seen from the road, have, with dark humour by some locals, been called "Shag Pile" (a pun referencing the style of carpet).

Although no longer used by shipping, the estuary is accessible as far as Ferrymead using shallow draught vessels up to about 30 tons if the Sumner bar is crossed in favourable wind, sea and tidal conditions. The shipping channel into the estuary lies to the northern side of the rock.

== Toponymy ==
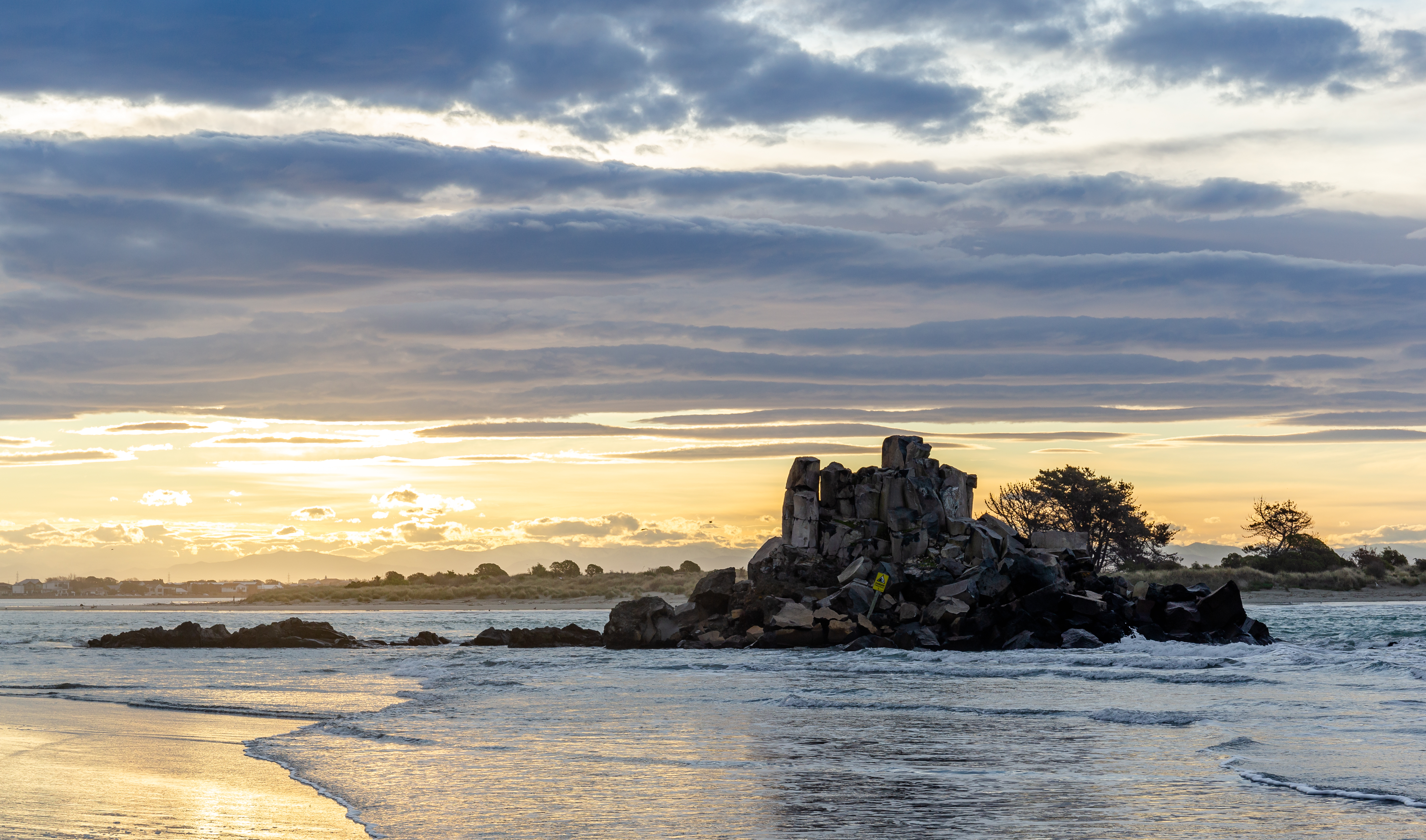
Rapanui at sunset

Rapanui is the Māori name for the "black, tooth-like rock" on the beach at the mouth of the Avon-Heathcote Estuary, according to James Cowan when he retold a 200-year-old Māori legend. According to Waitaha Taiwhenua o Waitaki tradition the name means the great sternpost and is one of the oldest landmarks of Te Wai Pounamu, standing at the entrance to the Ōpāwaho/Ōtākaro (Heathcote/Avon) estuary. Sumner Town Clerk, J. F. Menzies, suggests that the Māori navigators approaching the rock from seaward might exclaim "Te Rapanui" - "the great sternpost" when they saw the rock formation because it resembles "the huge sternpost of a canoe with its base extending landwards." An alternative translation of scattered stones deeply embedded in the ground is also appropriate, according to Gordon Ogilvie, a local historian.

The Sumner Borough Council resolved that the rock be known as Rapanui in all its official documents, as well as giving the same name a nearby water reservoir.

Shag Rock appears as the name of this feature on HMS Pandora's December 1854 survey chart of the Sumner Bar. It appeared as an unnamed feature on maps from as early as 1852.

Since the 2011 earthquakes shattered the rock and scattered some of the fragments, the rock pile, significantly reduced in height, has been referred to as Shag Pile, a pun on the carpet style or, more rudely, as Shagged Rock, by some locals possessing a darker sense of humour.

== Geology ==
The rock is a sea stack that has been isolated from the nearby cliff by various erosive process. The changes in the size and shape of the rock seen in the 2010-2011 earthquake sequence are part of this ongoing natural process. The adjacent cliff collapse seen in the recent earthquakes is suggestive of how the rock stack became disconnected from the adjacent cliff face. Also, the rock field on the landward side of the rock stack suggests that the stack was significantly larger in pre-historic times.

=== Before the 2011 Canterbury earthquake ===
The rock rose about 11 metres (36 feet) above the sea, depending on the state of the tide.

=== 2011 Canterbury earthquake ===
It crumbled during the 6.3 earthquake of 22 February 2011, which reduced its height.

== Navigation and shipping ==
The rock is a prominent landmark for navigators at sea as well as travellers on the road to Sumner. It marks the outflow from the Avon Heathcote Estuary. The rock stands close to the southern shore and is accessible from the beach at low tide. Because of its height and separation from the background cliffs it serves as a natural navigation marker that can be used by navigators to judge a vessel's position at sea, especially when close to shore in the shoaling waters in the vicinity of the Sumner Bar. During the 19th century the estuary outflow flowed much closer inshore, across the beach towards the nearby Cave Rock before sweeping out to sea. When the bar area was surveyed by HMS Pandora in 1854, the sandbar the extended from the Southshore was exposed at half tide seaward of much of Sumner beach and the outflow channel swept the beach area free of sand, forming a small bay where there is now a sizeable beach. The former shoreline is apparent from historic photographs and painting of Sumner beach showing roads at the water's edge, and a jetty into the bay where the beachside tea rooms are now.

At the time of the HMS Pandora survey, the shipping channel required vessels to sail close to and almost directly at Cave Rock before rounding a knee in the channel and sailing across the beach to round Shag Rock. Today, the channel between the estuary and the sea flows more directly out to sea on the northern side of the rock.

Although no longer used by shipping, the estuary was accessible as far as Ferrymead using shallow draught vessels up to about 30 tons, if the bar is crossed in favourable wind, sea and tidal conditions. Ships could even sail up the Avon River to the Bricks near present day Barbados Street in the central city, as well as up the Heathcote River as far as where the Radley Street Bridge is now. Steamers could easily sail upriver as far as Steam Wharf, by the Tunnel Road roundabout on Ferry Road, where there is a memorial today. Above Steam Wharf the Heathcote river became too narrow for steamers to turn around, however the channel was still deep enough to service the industrial area.

== Art and Culture ==
Shag Rock and its environment has been the subject of art since the 19th century.

=== Photography ===
Shag Rock has been the subject of photographs from as early as 1861.

- The Shag Rock, Sumner, Canterbury, a 125 x 183 mm albumen photographic print, showing Shag Rock as an island and the Sumner Road (Peacock's Gallop) before the tramway was constructed. Behind the rocks, there are several moored sailing vessels in the channel on the outgoing tide. Photographed by William Travers. Purchased in 1988 by the Auckland Art Gallery Toi o Tāmaki, Accession no 1988/17/1 (Website only; Not on display)
- View of Shag Rock at Sumner, near Christchurch. Price, William Archer, 1866-1948 :Collection of post card negatives. Ref: 1/2-000910-G. Alexander Turnbull Library, Wellington, New Zealand. /records/22736213

=== Poetry ===
There is an Ode to Shag Rock.

=== Visual arts ===
Artists who have used Shag Rock in their works include

- Charles Decimus Barraud (1822-1897)
  - Shag Rock, Sumner - An 1869 watercolour of Shag Rock and the Sumner road under the cliffs at Clifton. The work was purchased in 2017 by the Christchurch Art Gallery.
  - Sumner Rocks, Banks Peninsula - A watercolour tinted wood engraving by the same artist depicting a slightly different scene. Also held by the Christchurch Art Gallery.
- William Mathew Hodgkins (1833-1898)
  - The Shag Rock, Sumner, Christchurch - One of three seaside Sumner scenes by Hodgkins, this work depicts Shag Rock with a sailing vessel in the shipping channel. Held by the Alexander Turnbull Library, Wellington, New Zealand.
  - The Sumner River, Canterbury, from the Cave Rock Dated 1 April 1870, this work depicts two sailing vessels at Sumner, one at anchor, the other at the waters edge, along with small boats on the beach and Shag Rock in the background as seen through a cave opening.

=== In popular culture ===
There is a Dulux paint colour called Shag Rock.

==== Rogue art ====
A "Rogue Art" sculpture of a paper airplane, about a metre long and made from sheet steel, was installed on top of the rock in late February 2020. The artwork appeared in mysterious circumstances overnight and because permission of the local hapu had not been obtained, and they objected, the City Council later removed the artwork by sawing it off at its base and were investigating prosecuting the culprits. The "Rogue Artist" late contacted a local reporter to apologize for their ill-informed actions and explain the artwork was called "Crash but we do not burn – February 22, 2011" and installed to commemorate the tenth anniversary of the 2011 Christchurch earthquake.

== See also ==
- Desert island
- List of islands

== Sources ==
- "Rapanui – Shag Rock". my.christchurchcitylibraries.com. Christchurch City Libraries.^{- NB:Use with care. This source cites Wikipedia for some content.}
- "Shag Rock". NZGB Gazetteer. New Zealand Geographic Board Ngā Pou Taunaha o Aotearoa.
