= Aquatic Toxicology =

- Discipline: Toxicology
- Language: English
- Edited by: M.J. Nikinmaa, R.S. Tjeerdema

Publication details
- History: 1981–present
- Publisher: Elsevier (Monthly14/year)
- Impact factor: 4.964 (2020)

Standard abbreviations
- ISO 4: Aquat. Toxicol.

Indexing
- CODEN: AQTODG
- ISSN: 0166-445X (print); 1879-1514 (web)
- LCCN: 81649727
- OCLC no.: 07505256

Links
- Journal homepage; Online access

Aquatic Toxicology is a monthly peer-reviewed scientific journal that was established in 1981. It covers toxicological research in aquatic environments.

== Abstracting and indexing ==
The journal is abstracted and indexed by BIOSIS, Chemical Abstracts, Current Contents/Agriculture, Biology & Environmental Sciences, EMBASE, BIOBASE, GEOBASE, and Scopus. According to the Journal Citation Reports, the journal has a 2020 impact factor of 4.964.
