= New Brighton Pier, Christchurch =

Pier in Christchurch, New Zealand

Coordinates: 43.5065°S 172.7330°E

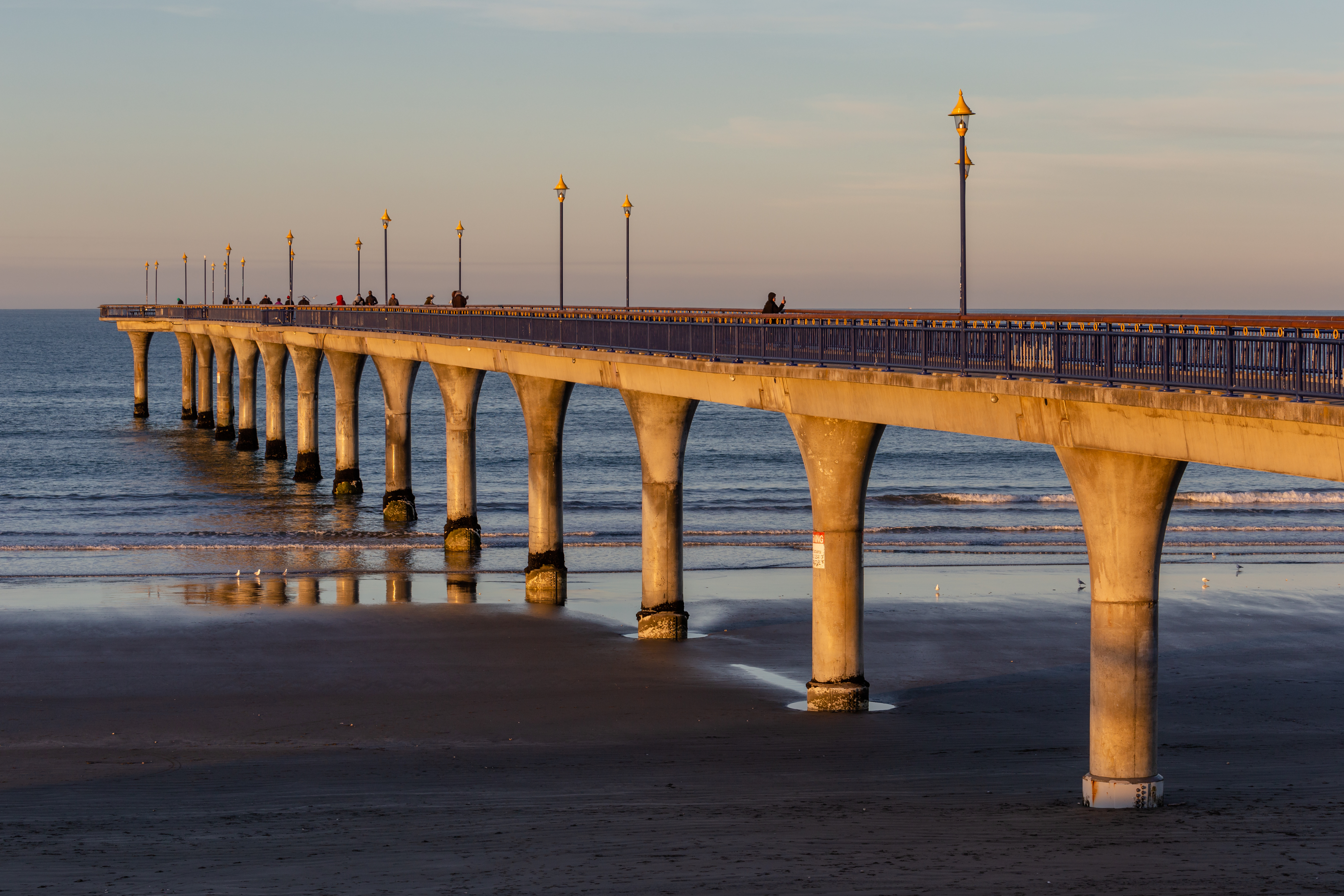
The second New Brighton Pier

There have been two New Brighton Piers in the Christchurch, New Zealand, suburb of New Brighton. The first pier, of wooden construction, opened on 18 January 1894 and was demolished on 12 October 1965. The current concrete pier was opened on 1 November 1997. It is one of the icons of Christchurch.

== First pier ==
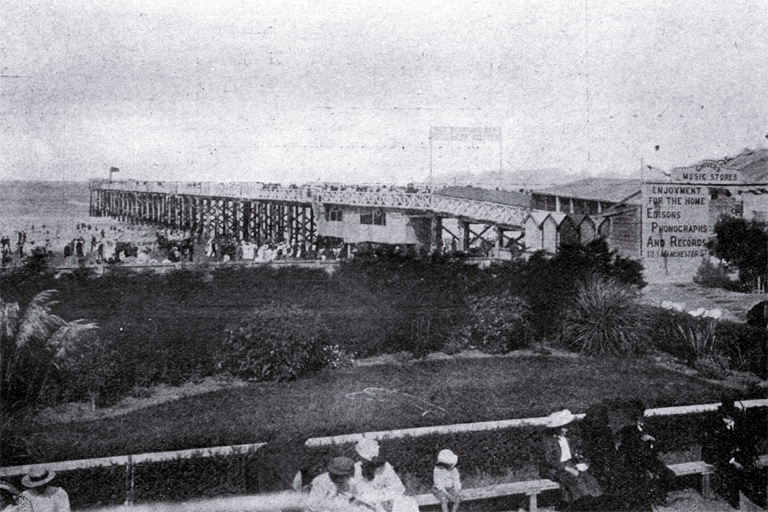
The pier in 1909

The first pier was built from timber, using tarred ironbark for the piles and kauri for the beams. Construction began in 1891 and it was officially opened by the Governor of New Zealand, the Lord Glasgow, on 18 January 1894. Other dignitaries who attended the opening included the Mayor of Christchurch (Walter Cooper), the Mayor of Linwood (J. R. Brunt), and two members of the House of Representatives (George John Smith and William Whitehouse Collins). It started raining just as the opening ceremony finished, and planned fireworks were postponed. The pier had been built to a length of 700 feet (210 m). There were plans to build an octagonal end to the pier including a large building, but this was never carried out. Over time, the pier decayed. The city council ordered the pier to be demolished, and this was done during just four and a half hours in the early morning of 12 October 1965 on a receding tide.

== Second pier ==
For 30 years, the New Brighton community rallied for another pier to be built. The Pier and Foreshore Society had campaigned to save the original pier, and the group continued lobbying for a new pier. When NZ$2m had been raised, this was matched by funding from Christchurch City Council and a new pier was designed using reinforced concrete. The new pier was built in exactly the same location, and was officially opened on 1 November 1997. It spans 300 metres (980 ft), which makes it the longest ocean pier in Australasia. The New Brighton Pier is held as the icon of New Brighton and later the icon of Christchurch after the 22 February 2011 earthquake that significantly damaged Christchurch's Cathedral. The pier is one of Christchurch's tourist attractions. Currently the New Brighton Pier is the venue of a number of events, such as regular skate on the Pier events and the annual Guy Fawkes fireworks display held on 5 November every year. The pier sustained some damage in the various earthquakes, which was exacerbated in the 2016 Christchurch earthquake. Repairs started in February 2017, took 16 months, and cost NZ$8.5m. New Brighton pier reopened again in May 2018.

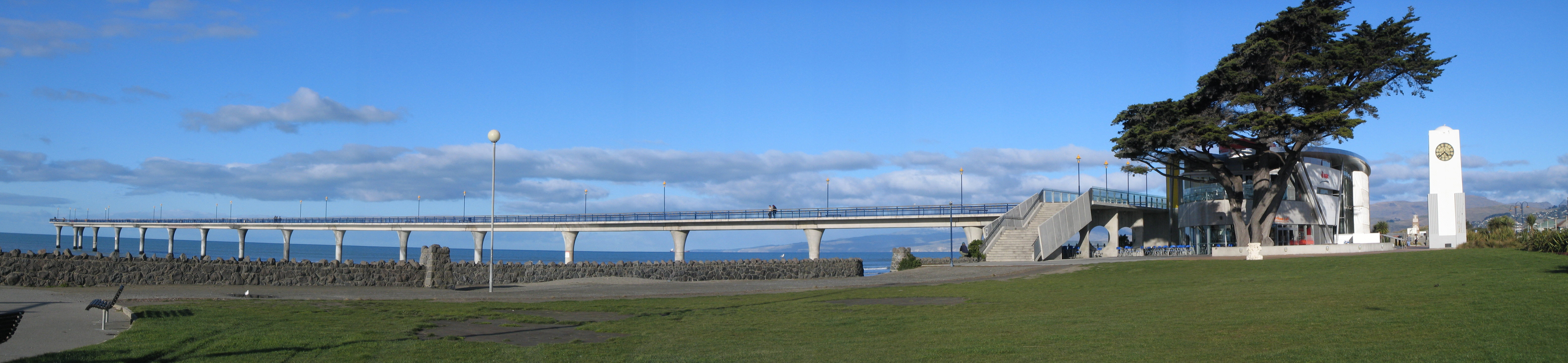
Panorama of the pier

In 2021 a tsunami detection gauge was installed on the pier. It was partially replaced in June 2026 after one of the sensors stopped working.
