= Christchurch 360 Trail =

Urban walking trail in Christchurch, New Zealand

- Length: 135 km (84 mi)
- Location: New Zealand
- Use: Walking
- Website: www.christchurch360trail.org.nz

The Christchurch 360 Trail is a walking trail, approximately 135 km (84 mi) long, encircling the city of Christchurch, New Zealand. The Trail is made up of a number of existing walkways (in the New Zealand sense of the word), other off-road tracks through vegetated areas, pathways through urban parks and reserves, and link sections on footpaths alongside suburban streets.

The Trail is a loop walk (the name 360 Trail refers to 360 degrees of a circle), and thus can be started and finished at any point, and walked in either a clockwise or anti-clockwise direction.

== History ==
Botanist Colin Meurk had been discussing and advocating for a perimeter walkway around Christchurch since around 1990; In 1991 a group of interested parties met at Orana Park to plan a connected walkway that cicumnavigated Christchurch. Sections of the walkway were developed piecemeal in conjunction with Forest & Bird, who advertised each hike as a "Meurky Walk", and that name was informally applied to the entire proposed trail.

During 2014, negotiation with landowners and the Christchurch City Council established and signposted the route. The newly-named Christchurch 360 Trail was officially opened by Deputy Mayor Vicki Buck on 3 October 2015, at an event at Wetlands Grove, Bexley, as part of Christchurch's annual Walking Festival. Most years since as part of the festival a small group has walked the entire trail, taking usually eight days, though it has been run in 24 hours as a fundraiser. It can be cycled, though because some sections follow roads it cannot be promoted as a cycleway.

== Description ==
The trail is divided into eight sections, each an average 17 km (11 mi) long; the entire trail is approximately 135 km. Each section begins and ends with a map board and is marked with posts bearing the spiral logo logo of the trail. The sections together encircle Christchurch, linking existing trails and connecting a variety of natural habitats like hills, grassland, estuary, and lagoons.

The sections of the trail, travelling anticlockwise from the southeast, are:

- Godley Cliffs (16.5 km) From Mt Cavendish and the Christchurch Gondola along the Port Hills to Godley Head and down to Sumner.
- Estuary Marshes (19.3 km) From Ferrymead along the coastal pathway to Charlesworth Reserve before diverting inland to New Brighton. The trail was originally intended to ran along the seaward edge of the oxidation ponds in Te Huingi Manu Wildlife Refuge, to access the Avon Heathcote Estuary, but this was opposed by the Avon-Heathcote Estuary Ihutai Trust citing the possible impact on the migratory birds that use the ponds.
- Dunes Wetlands (15.9 km) Traverses Travis Wetland and Bottle Lake Forest before following sand dunes north along Pegasus Bay to Spencer Park.
- Brooklands Mouth (10.3 km) From Brooklands Lagoon to the Styx River and west along the Waimakariri.
- Waimakariri Braids (19.2 km) Follows stopbanks alongside the Waikakariri River west to McLeans Island.
- Avonhead Gardens (27.3 km) Through McLeans Grassland Reserve, since 2023 skirting north of Christchurch Airport, then south through Burnside to Avonhead, the University of Canterbury, and Riccarton Bush.
- Ōpāwaho Divide (16.3 km) From RIccarton to Hillmorton, Aidanfield, Halswell, and Halswell Quarry Park. The name of this leg references crossing from the watersheds of the Ōtākaro / Avon River to the Ōpāwaho / Heathcote.
- Sugarloaf Hills (18.3 km) Climbs via the Kennedys Bush Track to the Summit Road and the Sign of the Kiwi, then follows the Crater Rim Walkway to the Bridle Path and Mount Cavendish.

== Gallery ==
Trail marker at McLeans Grassland Reserve

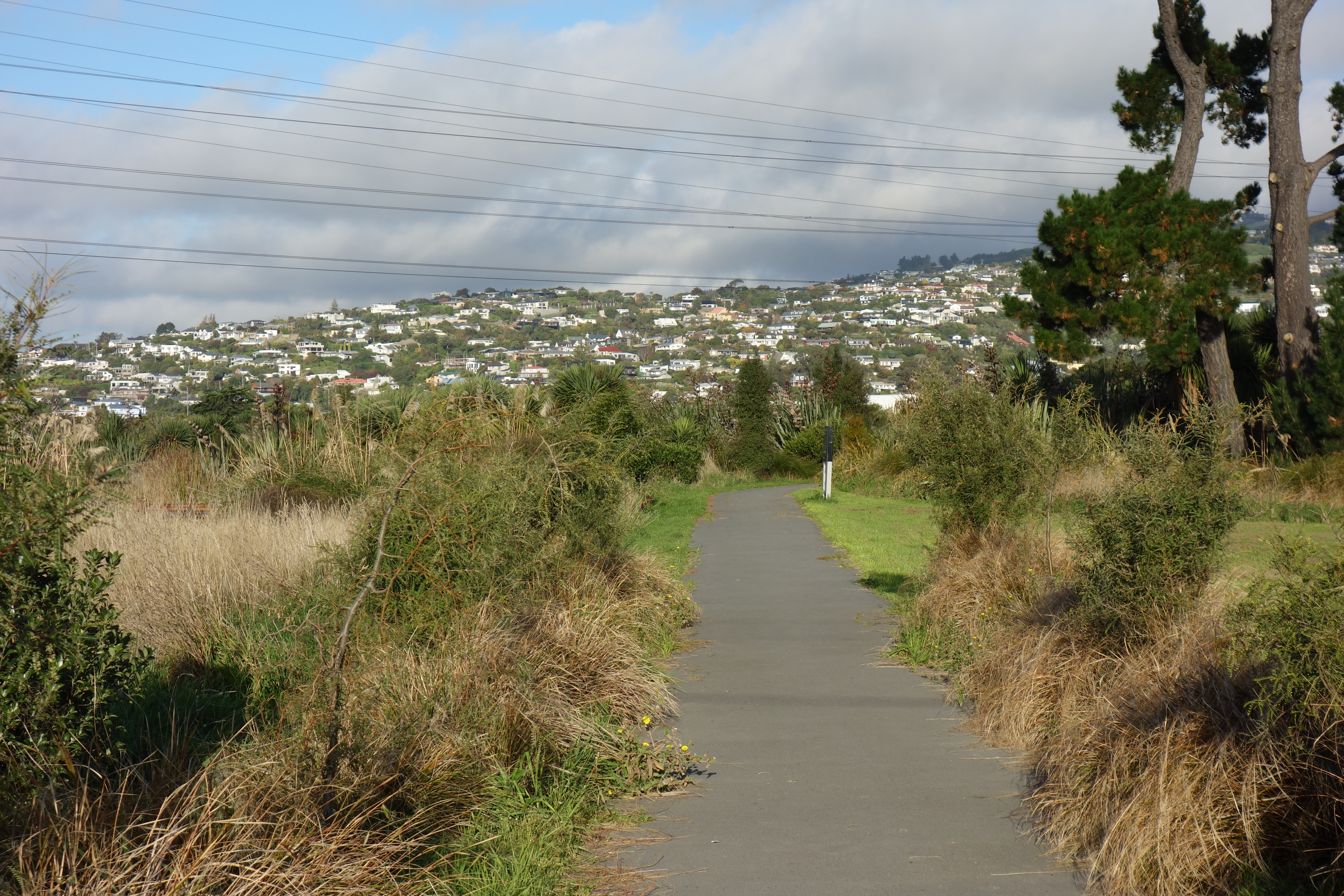
The trail at Charlesworth Reserve

Trail marker in Charlesworth Reserve

Looking across the estuary to Ferrymead
