= Brooklands Lagoon =

Lagoon in New Zealand

Coordinates: 43.414°S 172.707°E

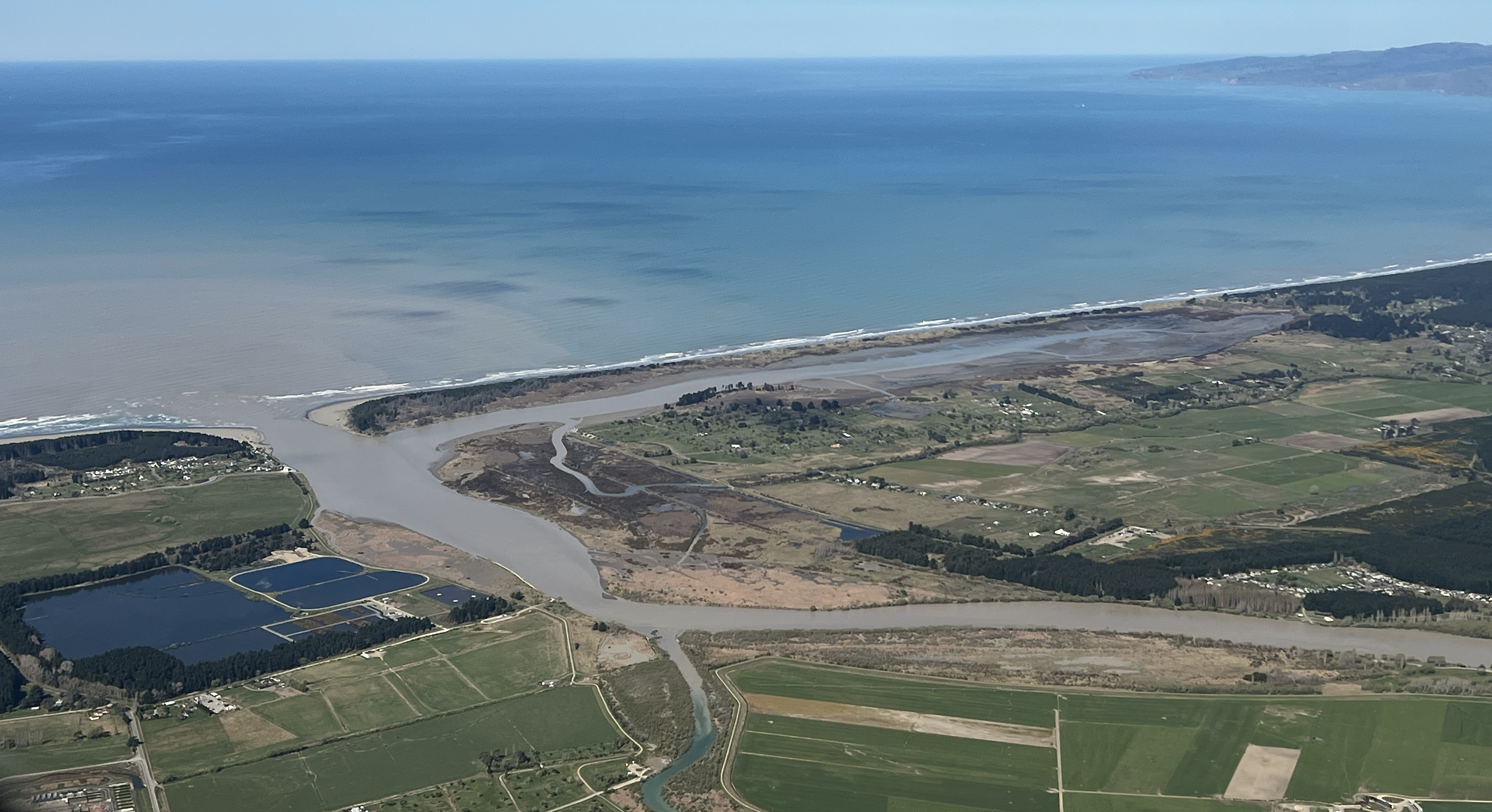
Brooklands Lagoon from the air, looking east to Banks Peninsula

Brooklands Lagoon is an elongated estuary near Brooklands, Christchurch. The Styx river drains into it and it is at the mouth of the Waimakariri river. The Waimakariri used to drain out of Brooklands Lagoon towards the Spencer Park end. This changed when engineers dug through the sand dunes to provide a more direct course to the sea in 1930 in order to reduce the risk of flooding from the Waimakariri River. The Lagoon is protected from the Pegasus Bay (and the sea) by Brooklands Spit. To the south of it is Bottle Lake Forest and Spencer Park. The lagoon is approximately 270 hectares in size, 4.5 kilometers long and 800 meters at its widest. Spring tides will bring approximately 1.6 million cubic meters of water into the lagoon.

It was frequently used by the locals prior to the 2010 and 2011 Christchurch earthquakes, where most of Brooklands was red zoned and effectively wiped off the map.

== Aquatic life ==
Shellfish, including cockles and pipis are found in the sand near the lagoon mouth. Eels, brown trout and yellow eyed mullet are also found in the lagoon. White bait (and white baiters) are often present in the lagoon.

== Flora ==
The mudflats support numerous native plants including sedges, rushes, grasses and saltmarsh ribbonwood. Bachelor's button, yellow lotus and swamp flax can also be seen.

== Birdlife ==
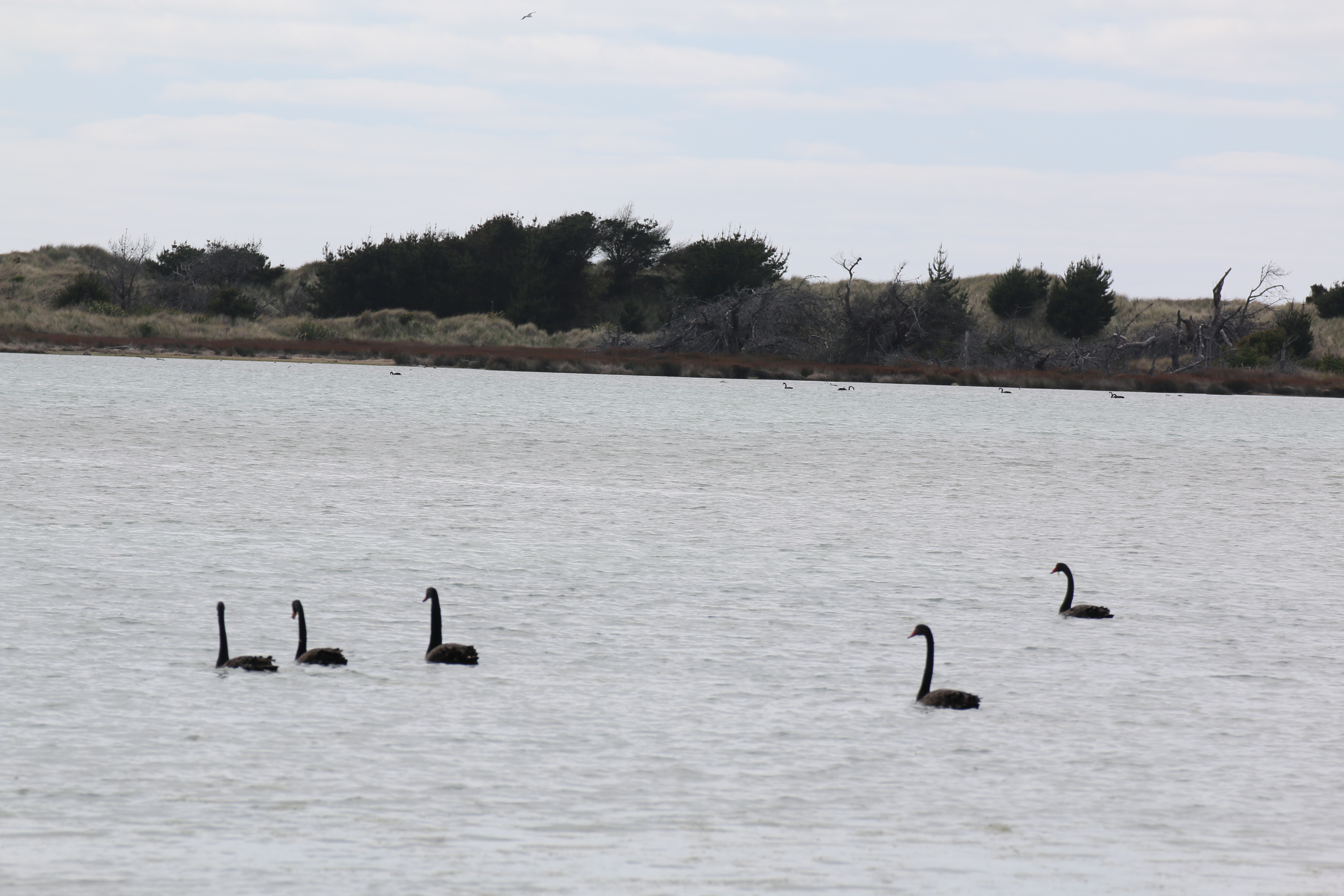
Black swans swimming in Brooklands Lagoon

Brooklands lagoon is a tidal estuary and mostly intact natural ecosystem. Over 100 different types of birds have been spotted in Brooklands Lagoon. Local birds that can be spotted include the pied stilt, banded dotterel, white-faced heron, pūkeko and pied shag. Migratory birds that have been spotted include the South Island pied oystercatcher, Caspian tern, white-fronted tern and New Zealand shoveler. Birds that have been rarely seen include the white heron, grey duck, black-fronted tern and wrybill.

== Walking tracks ==
Walking tracks maintained by the Christchurch City Council exist around the majority of Brooklands Lagoon. Part of the track is included in the Christchurch 360 Trail.

== Brooklands Lagoon public toilet ==
The Christchurch City Council installed a public toilet which won an architectural award. The six square meter building was designed to be a low-maintenance building which recognises the perspectives of local iwi and the history of the site yet will deter vandalism. It was completed in 2011 and cost $80,000.

== Rāhui ==
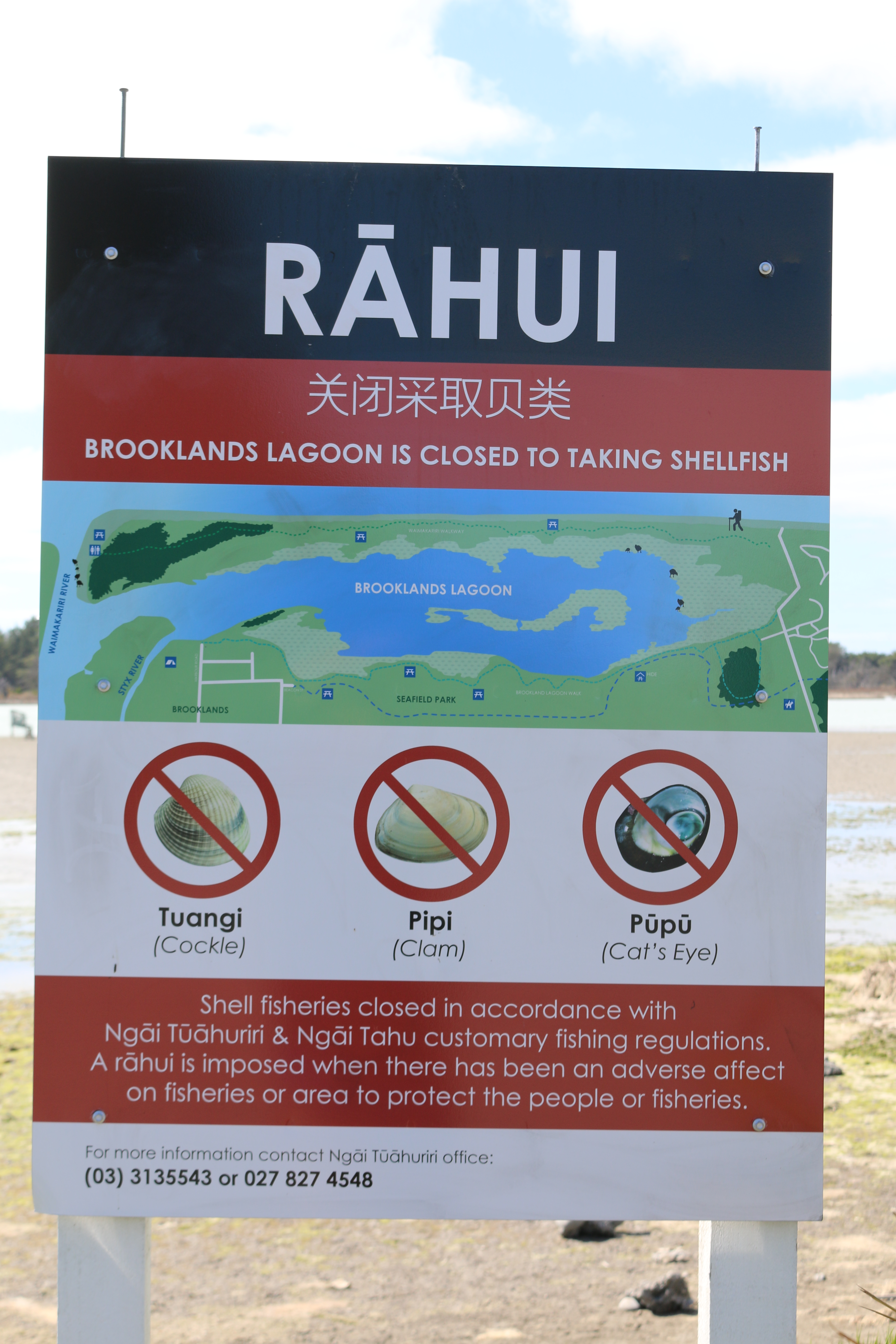
Rāhui, Brooklands Lagoon

In late 2020, Brooklands Lagoon was closed to the collection of shellfish (cockles, pipis, cat's eyes, clams) in accordance with the Ngāi Tūāhuriri and Ngāi Tahu customary fishing regulations. This is in order to protect the fisheries.
