= Bottle Lake =

Bottle Lake may refer to:

- Bottle Lake, New Zealand, suburb of Christchurch, New Zealand

- Bottle Lake Forest, forest making up most of the Christchurch suburb

- Bottle Lake (Nova Scotia), lake in Canada
