= Brooklands, Christchurch =

Suburb of Christchurch, New Zealand

Brooklands
- Suburb
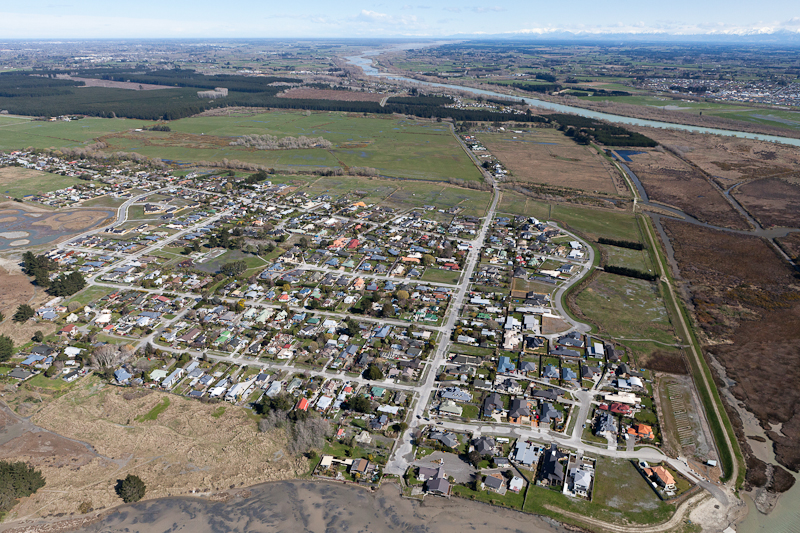
- Brooklands just after the 2010 Canterbury earthquake
- Interactive map of Brooklands
- Coordinates: 43°24′14″S 172°41′45″E
- Country: New Zealand
- City: Christchurch
- Local authority: Christchurch City Council
- Electoral ward: Coastal
- Community board: Waitai Coastal-Burwood-Linwood

Area
  - Land: 688 ha (1,700 acres)

Population (2023 Census)
  - Total: 186
  - Density: 27.0/km^{2} (70.0/sq mi)

Kaiapoi	(Waimakariri River)
	Brooklands	(Brooklands Lagoon)
Chaneys	(Bottle Lake Forest)

Brooklands is the northernmost suburb of Christchurch, New Zealand. The settlement was built on former swamp land adjacent to Brooklands Lagoon, which forms part of the Waimakariri River mouth. The land damage sustained in the 2010 and 2011 Christchurch earthquakes and subsequent Red Zone classification resulted in the buyout and demolition of nearly all properties in Brooklands, effectively wiping the suburb off the map.

== Geography ==
To the north, the Waimakariri River is the boundary. Brooklands Lagoon is the eastern part of the suburb, facing Pegasus Bay and forming part of the Waimakariri River mouth. The Styx River flows through Brooklands and into Brooklands Lagoon. Kainga is the semi-rural suburb to the west. Bottle Lake Forest is located to the south of Brooklands.

== History ==
In the 1960s, Brooklands was a "ramshackle settlement of fibrolite houses", and well-built dwellings were "almost a talking point". Fifty years on, houses were much more substantial.

=== 2010/11 earthquakes ===
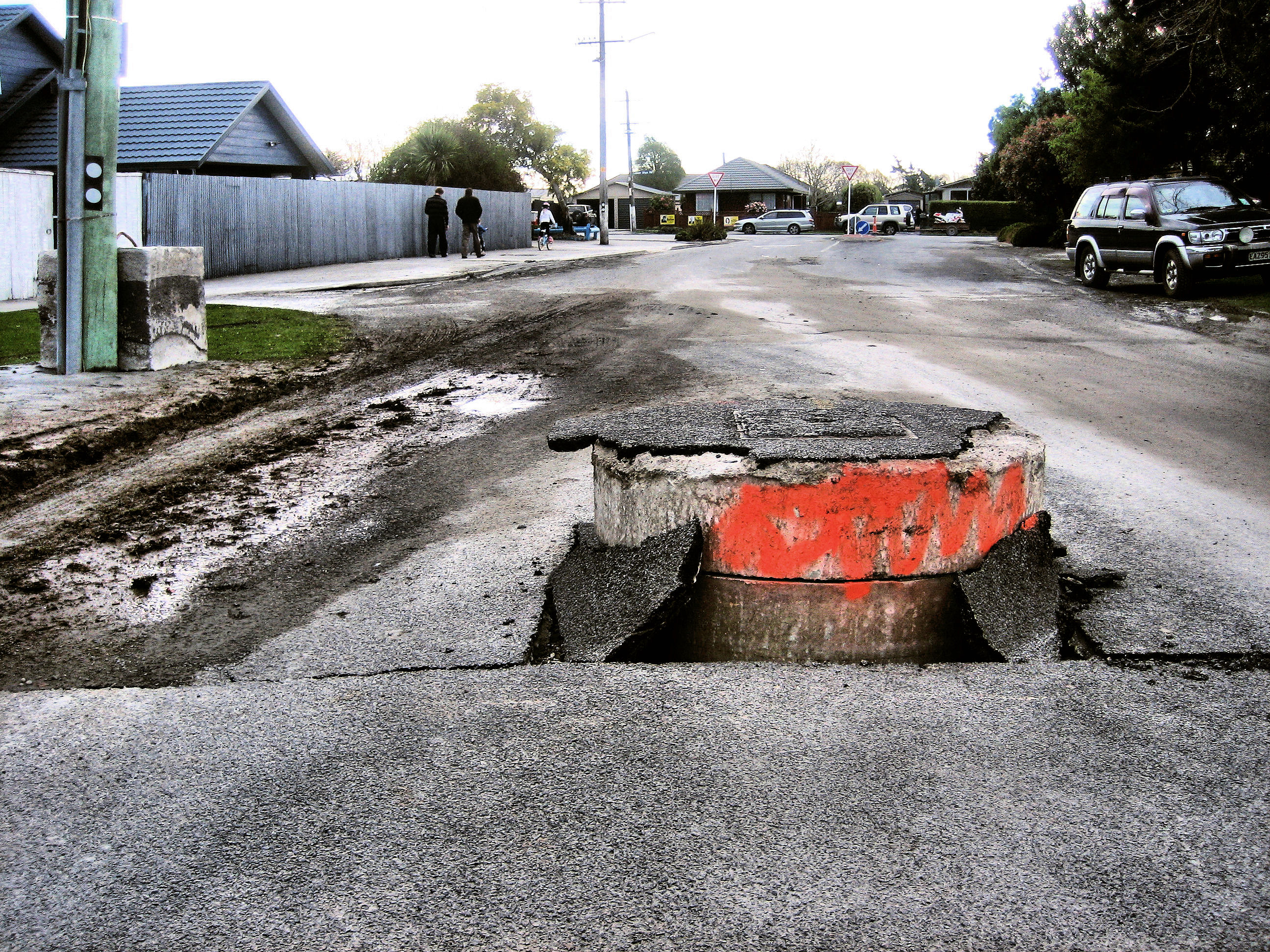
Damage in Brooklands where buoyancy caused by soil liquefaction pushed up an underground storm drain.

The suburb was badly affected by the 2010 Canterbury earthquake and the February 2011 Christchurch earthquake, resulting in land subsidence and liquefaction. As part of the ongoing earthquake recovery, the government announced on 17 November 2011 that the vast majority of Brooklands has been zoned red, meaning that those residential properties that have insurance would receive an offer for a government buyout of house and land. The land is deemed uneconomic to repair whilst houses are on it and will thus be bought. Some of the properties now condemned were built in 2011, and at least one house got its building consent from Christchurch City Council only after the February 2011 earthquake.

As of 2015, the majority of properties in Brooklands have been demolished, leaving only 25 residents who refused the government land-buyout offers remaining in the area.

== Demographics ==
Brooklands locality, which surrounds the lagoon, covers 6.88 km^{2} (2.66 sq mi). It is part of the larger Brooklands-Spencerville statistical area.

Historical population
Year	Pop.	±% p.a.
2006	1,080	—
2013	600	−8.05%
2018	189	−20.63%
2023	186	−0.32%
The 2006 population is for a smaller area of 3.08 km^{2}. The 2006 population for a slightly larger area of 6.91 km^{2} was 1,164. Source:

Brooklands had a population of 186 in the 2023 New Zealand census, a decrease of 3 people (−1.6%) since the 2018 census, and a decrease of 414 people (−69.0%) since the 2013 census. There were 87 males and 99 females in 69 dwellings. 1.6% of people identified as LGBTIQ+. The median age was 48.0 years (compared with 38.1 years nationally). There were 30 people (16.1%) aged under 15 years, 36 (19.4%) aged 15 to 29, 90 (48.4%) aged 30 to 64, and 33 (17.7%) aged 65 or older.

People could identify as more than one ethnicity. The results were 87.1% European (Pākehā), 9.7% Māori, 1.6% Pasifika, 8.1% Asian, and 3.2% other, which includes people giving their ethnicity as "New Zealander". English was spoken by 98.4%, Māori by 3.2%, and other languages by 9.7%. No language could be spoken by 1.6% (e.g. too young to talk). The percentage of people born overseas was 19.4, compared with 28.8% nationally.

Religious affiliations were 29.0% Christian. People who answered that they had no religion were 62.9%, and 8.1% of people did not answer the census question.

Of those at least 15 years old, 27 (17.3%) people had a bachelor's or higher degree, 93 (59.6%) had a post-high school certificate or diploma, and 36 (23.1%) people exclusively held high school qualifications. The median income was $37,700, compared with $41,500 nationally. 12 people (7.7%) earned over $100,000 compared to 12.1% nationally. The employment status of those at least 15 was 78 (50.0%) full-time, 27 (17.3%) part-time, and 6 (3.8%) unemployed.
