= Christchurch Drainage Board =

Drainage Board

- Successor: Christchurch City Council
- Established: 1876
- Founder: Christchurch District Drainage Act 1875
- Dissolved: 1989
- Type: Nonprofit, NGO
- Legal status: Board
- Purpose: Arrange Christchurch water flow

The Christchurch Drainage Board operated in New Zealand from 1876 to 1989 to manage sewage and stormwater drainage in and around Christchurch.

== The site chosen for the city ==
The surveyor, Joseph Thomas, chose the site for the new settlement of Christchurch in 1849, ahead of the arrival of the first settlers in December 1850. He planned a city covering around 1,000 acres straddling the Avon river. Although the site was slightly raised, and therefore drier, it was still part of a much larger area of tussock and dune covered swampland pitted with water bearing gullies and raised sand dunes. This site presented the soon to arrive settlers with two problems. First, the land had to be drained, thereby lowering the high water-table; and second, the condition of the underlying land after this had happened made installing drainage pipes, as part of the city's infrastructure, difficult to accomplish.

== Initial water problems as the population grew, 1850–1876 ==
As the population increased, the area's originally clean water was quickly becoming polluted and disease ridden, adding another problem for the newly created settlement. The Canterbury Provincial Government was established in 1853 and became responsible for managing the water sodden land. In 1862, Christchurch City Council came into being and took over drainage responsibility, although at the time the council was responsible only for land within Thomas' original city belt. From 1864, different Roads Boards also undertook some drainage work in specific areas outside the city belt.

The Canterbury Provincial Council had neglected infrastructure work; it had built only a few open stormwater drains and little else. This presented a problems for the Christchurch City Council when it took over. A noticeable problem was that Christchurch was particularly unhealthy, with residents facing water borne deceases caused by the lack of effective drainage. Consequently, in 1862 the council established the Sanitary Commission and the Inspector of Nuisance. The Provincial surgeon at the time noted as the causes of increased fever illnesses: “Undrained swamps and basins of stagnant water...Cesspools...Surface water that was draining into the wells and the river and “generally every condition necessary for the development of a virulent fever existed.”

In 1864, the council adopted a plan to take "night soil" to the sandhills in Bromley and to establish sewerage pipes. However, the pipes, that had to be brought in from elsewhere, did not begin arriving into Lyttelton until 1866. Another cause of delay was that the council simply had no money to pay for the drainage pipes, so they remained at the dock. None of this was helped by The Ratepayers Society that had grievances with the council and was encouraging residents not to pay their rates.

== Drainage Board established, 1875–76 ==
By the 1870s, there were annual epidemics of diphtheria. In 1875, 152 people died from typhoid and this lead the CCC and surrounding road boards to meet to resolve the problem. In late 1875, the Christchurch District Drainage Act was passed, coming into effect in January 1876. It established the Christchurch Drainage Board with the dual tasks of land drainage and wastewater management. The Public Health Act 1876, gave the Drainage Board responsibility for the Board of Health.

When the Drainage Board was established in 1876, an early task was to create survey points around the city called benchmarks. There was a fixed reference point from which all these benchmarks would be measured called Christchurch Drainage Datum (CDD), which had been created in 1874. The CDD had been chosen arbitrarily at 50 feet below the floor of the foyer at Christchurch Cathedral. The foyer floor became the initial benchmark, called A82. A commonly used datum point is sea-level but because the CDD, which was point zero, was below sea-level (it was 9.043m below the 1937 mean sea-level at Lyttelton), all drainage and building work around the city would have positive height values because they used CDD and the benchmarks for their measurements. Therefore all infrastructure and buildings were shown as being above sea-level when they might in fact have been below. This unusual situation was notably the case with underground pipes in low-lying areas such as New Brighton.

The engineer, William Clark, drew up a drainage scheme for the city and surrounds which was published in 1878. A key feature was the separation of wastewater and stormwater, underground ovident pipes and a sewerage pumping stations to take wastewater to Bromley sandhills. The first station opened in 1882 when 33.35 miles of connected sewer pipes had been laid, and many of the drains are still used in the 21st century. Improvement in public health was immediately apparent. The Drainage Board passed its responsibilities for the costly Board of Health to the council in 1885. Despite no longer having to pay for the Board of Health pipes, and managing only five pipelaying projects of its own between 1881 and 1884, the Drainage Board still ran out of money. In 1885, it did however set up the Bromley sewerage farm. Sewerage stations pumped wastewater to the farm where it was treated before being drained into the estuary.

In 1901, keen to avoid an outbreak of bubonic plague that had recently reached Sydney, the CCC helped fund the laying of more sewerage pipes. It was particularly keen to end the remaining night soil collections. The dry earth pan and night-soil collection had been set up in 1877 and operated by John Brightling. Night soil collection still took place into the 20th century.

== Key undertakings by the Board during its existence, 1876–1989 ==
From 1882, a system of sewage pipes was constructed inside the original city belt, based on Clark's plan. Gravity took the sewage to a pump station on Tuam Street and from there it was pumped to a Sewage farm at the Bromley sandhills. The sewage was in an underground pipe for one and three-quarter miles before continuing along surface drains to the sewage farm. The sandhills were levelled in 1882–83 and paddocks created. After simple treatment at Bromley, the sewage was sent out into the estuary.

As the city's population grew, the Drainage Board lay more and longer sewage pipes. More pump stations were built to serve the newly populated suburbs springing up outside the city belt, such as Sydenham, Merivale and Richmond. After World War One, to cope with this ever-increasing population, the Board’s area of responsibility expanded ad hoc with yet more pipes laid to serve outlying suburbs. Between 1927 and 1931, 24 new pump stations came into use, the main two being on Woodham Road and Randolph Street.

The Board's original district had been about 140sqkm, with boundaries on the Heathcote River to the south and around the watershed of the Avon and Styx Rivers to the north. Small areas south of the Heathcote had later been added and Sumner came under the Board's authority in 1940. There were further minor extensions in 1951–52 and the Board's district was significantly extended in the 1980s to cover land around Brooklands and Kainga in the north. At its end, the Board was responsible for around 290sqkm.

From 1949, the Board took steps to modernise the existing sewage farm at Bromley. In 1958, work began on a new treatment plant, which was opened in 1962. A key improvement on the earlier sewage farm was the use of two stage rather than one stage waste treatment.

== Final years of the Drainage Board ==
In the 1980s, the Board's narrow responsibilities made it less suited to environmental issues associated with the loss of surface water. An example of the clash between drainage and environmental issues was the Woolston Cut, commissioned in 1986 by the Drainage Board to mitigate riverside flooding along the Woolston Loop of the Heathcote River. This was done by diverting tidal upstream water across a wide man-made canal connecting the river in two places, thus by-passing the meander. This resulted in saline water, that had less distance to travel, reaching normally freshwater areas further upstream, with devasting environmental effects. The solution later adopted was to build a barrage on the loop that only diverted water upstream at times of flooding.

In 1989, the Christchurch Drainage Board ended as it merged with Christchurch City Council under wider local government reform.

== See also ==
- Christchurch Wastewater Treatment Plant

== Bibliography ==
- CCC Archives (2011). "Building a city from a swamp". Council archives-Council history. Christchurch City Council.
- Rice, Geoffrey W. (2021). CLEAN AND DECENT IN CHRISTCHURCH, NEW ZEALAND: Personal and Public Hygiene, 1850–1900 (PDF). HAWTHORNE PRESS with THE COTTER MEDICAL HISTORY TRUST. ISBN 978-0-473-57806-0.
- Watts, Robert H. (2011). "Christchurch Waterways Story" (PDF). Landcare Research.
- Wilson, J. (1989). Christchurch - Swamp to City - A Short History of the Christchurch Drainage Board 1875-1989. Canterbury Earthquakes Royal Commission. ISBN 0 908714 04 1.
