= Motunau Island =

Island in New Zealand

- Interactive map of Motunau Island

Geography
- Location: Pegasus Bay
- Coordinates: 43.0623°S 173.0782°E
- Area: 3 ha (7.4 acres)
- Length: 300 m (1000 ft)
- Width: 100 m (300 ft)
- Highest elevation: 25 m (82 ft)

Administration
- New Zealand
- South Island
- Region: Canterbury
- District: Hurunui

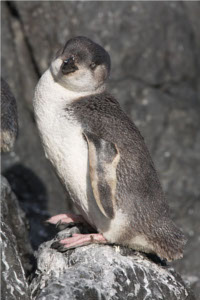
The island is an important breeding site for white-flippered penguins

Motunau Island is a small, 3 ha (7.4 acres), island nature reserve lying 1.2 km (0.75 mi) off the coast of New Zealand's South Island, at the northern end of Pegasus Bay, south of the mouth of the Motunau River. The reserve is managed by the Department of Conservation and access is by permit only.

== Description ==
About 300 m (980 ft) long by 100 m (330 ft) wide, the island has steep sides rising to a distinctive flat top some 25 m (82 ft) above sea level. Geologically, it consists of Tertiary rocks, capped with loess and gravels, and surrounded by eroding cliffs and wave-cut reefs. The soils are extensively burrowed by nesting seabirds.

== Flora and fauna ==
The island is an important site for seabirds. In 1967, it was the breeding site of an estimated 23,000 individual birds. It is home to a colony of 5,000 white-flippered penguins. Other birds recorded as breeding there include white-faced storm petrels, sooty shearwaters, fairy prions, variable oystercatchers and white-fronted terns. The island has the only colony of white-faced storm petrels found along the coast between Cook Strait and the Otago Peninsula.

Three species of lizard inhabit the island, including the species Oligosoma elium, which is considered 'Nationally Endangered'.

Fur seals use rock platforms around the island as haul-out sites. An elephant seal and a Hooker's sealion have also been reported on the island.

The main vegetation type on the island plateau is introduced grassland. Cliffs and scarps support grassland and herbfield. There are patches of mixed shrubland, including many introduced species.

== Conservation status ==
The island has had protected status since 1935, when it became a wildlife refuge. In 1958 it was also designated a Reserve for the Preservation of Flora and Fauna. It is free of mammalian predators; rabbits were eradicated between 1958 and 1962. Threats come from introduced boxthorn plants, which impale birds and block access to burrows, as well as from human disturbance resulting from unauthorised access.
