= Styx River (Canterbury) =

River in Christchurch, New Zealand

Coordinates: 43.397576°S 172.703289°E

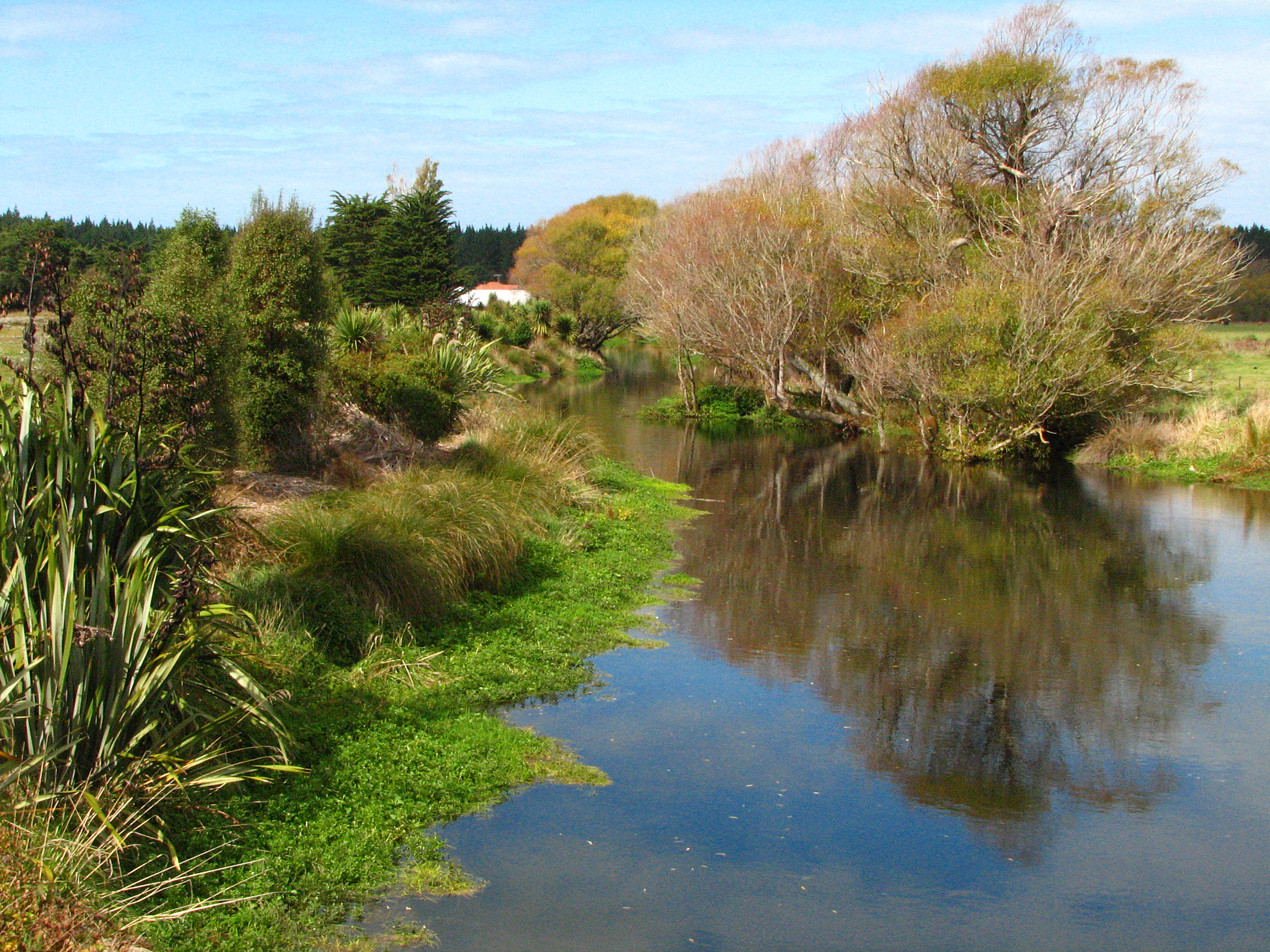
- The Styx River near Spencerville

Location
- Country: New Zealand

Physical characteristics
- Source
  - location: Harewood
- Mouth
  - location: Waimakariri River via Brooklands Lagoon
- Length: 24.8 km (15.4 mi)
- Basin size: 50 km^{2} (19 sq mi)

The Styx River (Māori: Pūharakekenui) runs along the northern boundary of Christchurch, New Zealand before flowing into the Waimakariri River close to its mouth via Brooklands Lagoon.

== Course ==
The river originates in the Christchurch suburb of Harewood, where the dry swale is intermittently filled with stormwater. Along its north-east direction, several springs feed the river. The Styx River has two main tributaries, these are the Kaputone Stream and Smacks Creek. Several other smaller waterways, both natural and man-made, drain into the Styx River, which flows through Belfast, Marshland and Spencerville before it reaches Brooklands where it flows into the Brooklands Lagoon and from there into the Waimakariri River. The Waimakariri River flows into Pegasus Bay.

== Naming ==
The Māori name for the Styx River is Pūharakekenui.

The origin of the English name for the river is lost to time. While the name is clearly derived from the Styx, a river in Greek mythology separating the Earth from the Underworld, the reason for this choice of name is unknown. It has been suggested that the river was originally named 'Sticks' and that this later became 'Styx'. A number of stories have been suggested. According to the first, European settlers crossed the river on flax-stick rafts; hence the name ‘Sticks’. According to the second, bundles of flax sticks were laid in the bed of the river. The third suggests that the name was derived from the use of flax sticks stuck in the ground to guide travellers to where the river was bridged by logs. Alternatively, it has been suggested that it is linked to the use by Māori of sites within the Styx catchment as sources of oils for embalming the dead and as a location for cremation ceremonies and recovery of the dead from the swamps. The name Styx first appeared in the Electoral Rolls in the 1865–66 Register.

== Styx Vision 2000–2040 ==
This river is situated in an area experiencing rapid urban development. A 40-year vision for the catchment was developed in the late 1990s, which was based on concerns and opportunities associated with the Styx ecosystem. After much consultation with the community the Christchurch City Council adopted the "Styx Vision 2000–2040" at its meeting on 11 July 2001.

The Styx Vision 2000–2040 is:

- Vision 1 – To achieve a "Viable Springfed River Ecosystem" to complement the other representative protected ecosystems of Christchurch such as the Port Hills, Travis Wetlands and the Coastline.
- Vision 2 – To create a "Source to Sea Experience" through the development of an Urban National Reserve.
- Vision 3 – To develop a "Living Laboratory" that focuses on both learning and research as practised by botanist Leonard Cockayne (1885–1934).
- Vision 4 – To establish "The Styx" as a place to be through maintaining and enhancing the special character and identity of the area.
- Vision 5 – To foster "Partnerships" through raising the quality of relationships as we move forward together.

These visions set the key directions for future actions, as well as guiding implementation. Christchurch City Council has since acquired large areas of land alongside waterways in the Styx catchment, which will eventually form an ecological network.
