= Colin Meurk =

New Zealand ecologist (born 1947)

Colin Meurk ONZM
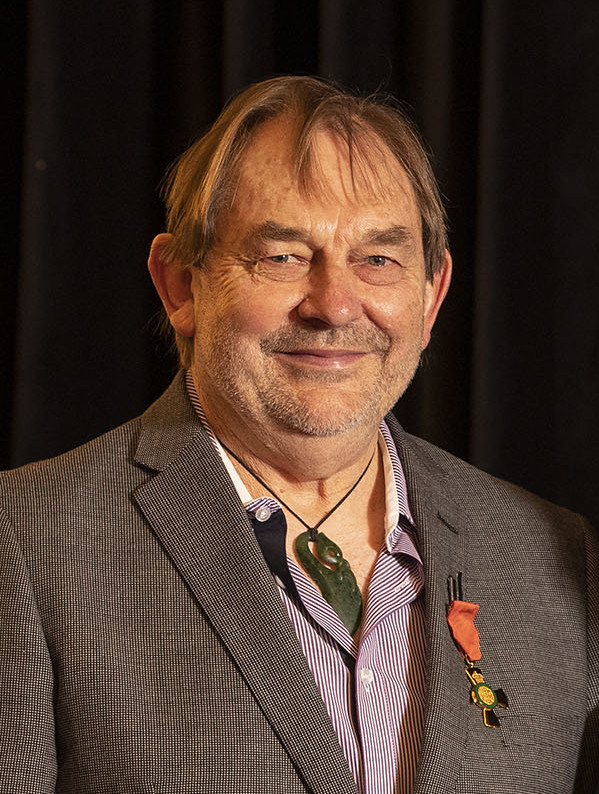
- Meurk in 2021
- Born: Colin Douglas Meurk; 1947 (age 78–79)
- Known for: Conservation advocacy and ecological restoration in Christchurch, New Zealand

Academic background
- Education: University of Canterbury, University of Otago
- Thesis: Alpine phytoecology of the rainshadow mountains of Otago and Southland, New Zealand (1982)

Academic work
- Discipline: Ecology
- Sub-discipline: New Zealand native, landscape ecology and urban ecology
- Institutions: Manaaki Whenua – Landcare Research

Colin Meurk ONZM (born 1947) is a New Zealand ecologist.

== Education and academia ==
Meurk attended high school at St Andrew's College, Christchurch, graduating in 1965. In 1969 he completed a Bachelor of Science at the University of Canterbury. Between 1970 and 1981 he completed a doctorate at the University of Otago, with his thesis analysing the production rate of plant biomass in tussock grassland at the southern end of the South Island.

In his role as a research fellow at Manaaki Whenua – Landcare Research he assisted in creating landscape models for creating ecological restoration plans across large areas, as well as a project to restore the ecology of the Waipara wine-growing region.

== Advocacy ==
Meurk has advocated for improvements to the urban ecology of Christchurch. He serves as the president of the Travis Wetland trust and was a key figure in securing the wetland as a protected reserve when it was being considered as a location for a housing development in the late 1980s and early 1990s. He is involved with ecological restoration projects there and across Christchurch. He has advocated for the creation of a predator free eco-sanctuary within the residential red zone, similar to the Zealandia project in Wellington. Meurk was instrumental in creating the Christchurch 360 Trail; a walking track that circles Christchurch to demonstrate the wide ecological diversity of the area.

In 2021 Meurk was made an Officer of the New Zealand Order of Merit by the Governor-General of New Zealand for services to ecological restoration.

In 2022 he ran for a seat on the Christchurch City Council in the Fendalton ward, but was not successful.
