= Ferrymead =

Suburb of Christchurch, New Zealand

- Suburb
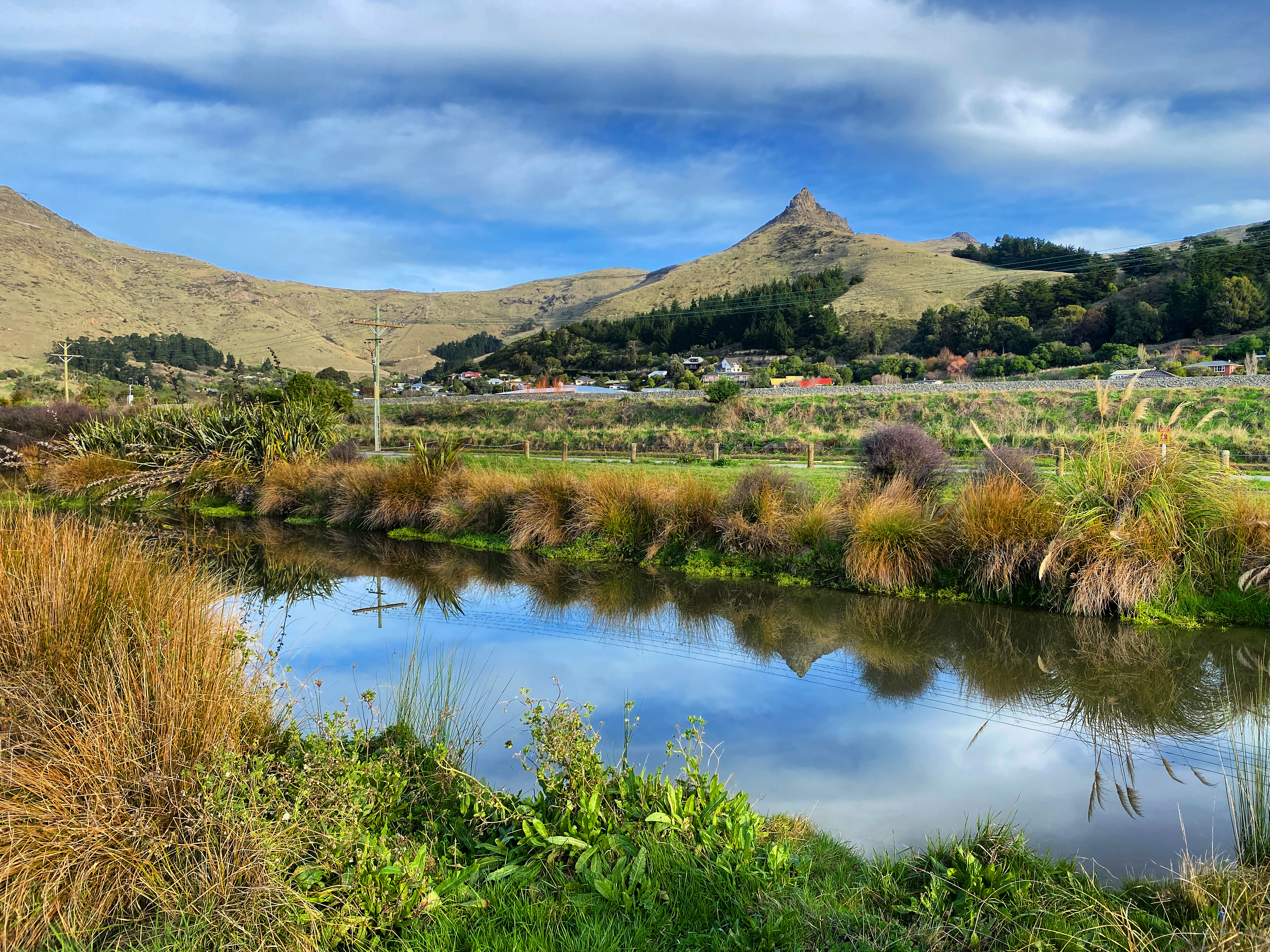
- Ferrymead Regional Park
- Interactive map of Ferrymead
- Coordinates: 43.5581°S 172.7057°E
- Country: New Zealand
- City: Christchurch
- Local authority: Christchurch City Council
- Electoral ward: Heathcote
- Community board: Waihoro Spreydon-Cashmere-Heathcote

Area
  - Land: 228 ha (560 acres)

Population (June 2025)
  - Total: 1,220
  - Density: 535/km^{2} (1,390/sq mi)

	Bromley	(Avon Heathcote Estuary / Ihutai)
Woolston	Ferrymead	Mount Pleasant
	Heathcote Valley

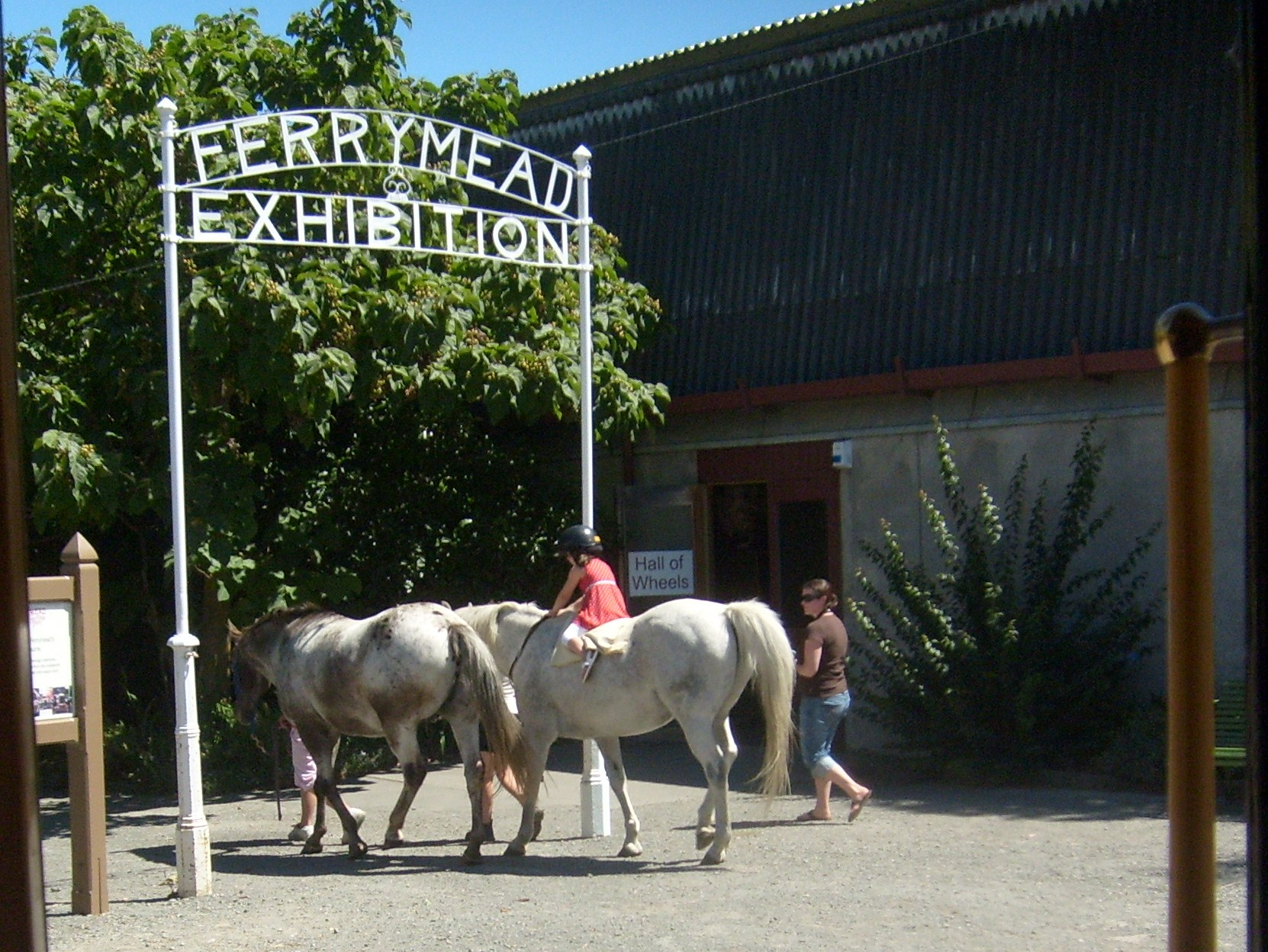
Ferrymead Heritage Park

Ferrymead is a suburb south-east of Christchurch, New Zealand. It is the main thoroughfare for reaching the eastern sea suburbs such as Sumner, as well as home to a number of cliff-top residences and businesses along the estuary front. After the 2011 Canterbury earthquake, a number of prominent Christchurch businesses relocated to the Ferrymead area, making it into a secondary business hub.

== Geography ==
Ferrymead is located on the Avon Heathcote Estuary / Ihutai, close to the point where the Ōpāwaho / Heathcote River drains into the estuary, and 3 kilometres (1.9 miles) west of the eventual outflow into Pegasus Bay. To the north lie the oxidation ponds from Christchurch's main sewage treatment works, part of a large wildlife refuge inhabited by many bird species; the northern part of Ferrymead encompasses the restored wetland of Charlesworth Reserve. To the south lie the Port Hills. The suburb is named for the ferry that operated across the Ōpāwaho / Heathcote River during the early period of settlement. After the 2011 Christchurch earthquake, a number of businesses have relocated to the suburb, making it a small hub and helping other shops and cafes grow.

== History ==
=== Māori settlement ===
Ohika-paruparu is the Māori name for the nearby mud flats. It is a combination of 'Ohika' which means 'fall' and 'paruparu' which means a muddy place. Māori speared eels and pātiki on the flat and the women gathered shellfish here.

=== Early European settlement ===
European settlement of the area dates from the arrival of the early colonists in 1850. Farming was the major industry of the area from its early years and parts of the Heathcote Valley are still in agricultural production. Ferry services began about 1851 firstly as a cattle punt. James Townsend (1788–1866) operated the punt service from 1852. When he sold up, the new owners called his house Ferry Mead Hotel (the meadow of the ferry) and this gave the name to the suburb. These ferry services continued until the completion of the Heathcote Bridge in 1864. Shipping at this time was also able to travel up the Ōpāwaho / Heathcote River as far as the Christchurch Quay adjacent to the present Radley Street Bridge. Later the Steam Wharf was opened by the present Tunnel Road intersection with Ferry Road. The Railway Wharf was opened in December 1863 along with the Ferrymead Railway.

Shipping on the river was very costly, around 2 pounds per tonne, more than it cost to bring cargo from the UK, and the ships were very small. Later on, steamships brought the cost down, but the difficulties of bringing ships over the bar of the Estuary and up the river itself were a considerable inconvenience. River shipping only outlasted the advent of the railway by a few years, although both the 1864 and 1907 bridges were designed to allow shipping to pass.

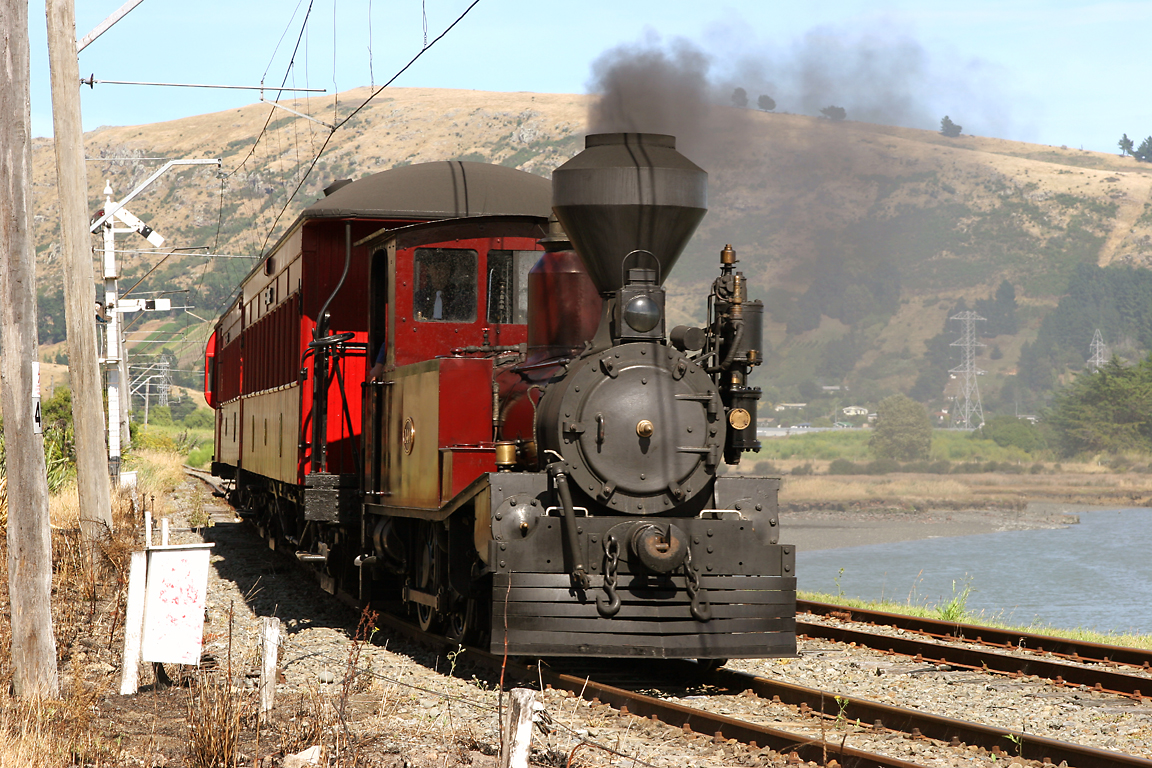
D Class No 140 at the restored Ferrymead railway

=== The original railway ===
On 1 December 1863 New Zealand's first public railway line was opened from Ferrymead to the central city.

The line was a temporary expedient to allow construction of the Heathcote/Lyttelton tunnel to proceed. It closed in 1867 after the opening of the Moorhouse railway tunnel to the port of Lyttelton.

Its track ran 7 km to the city of Christchurch, where the station was situated near to the site later occupied by the 1960 Christchurch station (closed in 1995). The locomotives and rolling stock were imported from Victoria, Australia, this being the main reason why the 5' 3" (1600 mm) railway gauge was adopted. Stations were located in later years at Woolston (formerly Hillsborough), Opawa and Linwood (the last two as passenger halts until the end of suburban trains in 1972). A branch also headed towards Heathcote at the time of tunnel construction.

The Moorhouse Tunnel was completed in a much shorter time than envisaged; and consequently the Ferrymead Railway was officially closed on 9 November 1867, the same day as the railway line to Lyttelton was opened. Following the subsequent conversion of the Main South Line to 3' 6" (1067 mm) gauge, all its broad gauge rolling stock was sold back to Australia. The ship they were placed on was wrecked off the New Zealand coast, but the cargo was salvaged. The rolling stock then lay abandoned for almost 100 years until the advent of Ferrymead Historic Park.

Following the commemoration of the centenary of this line, various groups including the New Zealand Railway and Locomotive Society (Canterbury Branch) (now the Canterbury Railway Society) became interested in developing the historical site. The Ferrymead Railway operates on the original railway formation as part of Ferrymead Heritage Park (formerly Ferrymead Historic Park).

== Demographics ==
The statistical area of Brookhaven-Ferrymead covers 2.28 km^{2} (0.88 sq mi). It had an estimated population of 1,220 as of June 2025, with a population density of 535 people per km^{2}.

Historical population
Year	Pop.	±% p.a.
2006	1,071	—
2013	1,017	−0.74%
2018	1,074	+1.10%
2023	1,161	+1.57%

Brookhaven-Ferrymead had a population of 1,161 in the 2023 New Zealand census, an increase of 87 people (8.1%) since the 2018 census, and an increase of 144 people (14.2%) since the 2013 census. There were 573 males, 591 females, and 3 people of other genders in 432 dwellings. 4.1% of people identified as LGBTIQ+. The median age was 37.4 years (compared with 38.1 years nationally). There were 207 people (17.8%) aged under 15 years, 219 (18.9%) aged 15 to 29, 534 (46.0%) aged 30 to 64, and 198 (17.1%) aged 65 or older.

People could identify as more than one ethnicity. The results were 84.5% European (Pākehā); 14.0% Māori; 9.6% Pasifika; 6.7% Asian; 0.5% Middle Eastern, Latin American and African New Zealanders (MELAA); and 2.6% other, which includes people giving their ethnicity as "New Zealander". English was spoken by 96.6%, Māori by 2.8%, Samoan by 3.9%, and other languages by 10.1%. No language could be spoken by 2.6% (e.g. too young to talk). New Zealand Sign Language was known by 0.5%. The percentage of people born overseas was 22.2, compared with 28.8% nationally.

Religious affiliations were 29.7% Christian, 1.0% Hindu, 0.3% Islam, 0.5% Māori religious beliefs, 0.8% Buddhist, 0.3% New Age, and 1.8% other religions. People who answered that they had no religion were 59.7%, and 6.2% of people did not answer the census question.

Of those at least 15 years old, 198 (20.8%) people had a bachelor's or higher degree, 516 (54.1%) had a post-high school certificate or diploma, and 243 (25.5%) people exclusively held high school qualifications. The median income was $40,800, compared with $41,500 nationally. 63 people (6.6%) earned over $100,000 compared to 12.1% nationally. The employment status of those at least 15 was 501 (52.5%) full-time, 144 (15.1%) part-time, and 33 (3.5%) unemployed.

== See also ==
- Ferrymead Heritage Park
