= Charlesworth Reserve =

Wetland reserve on in Christchurch, New Zealand

Charlesworth Wetland Reserve
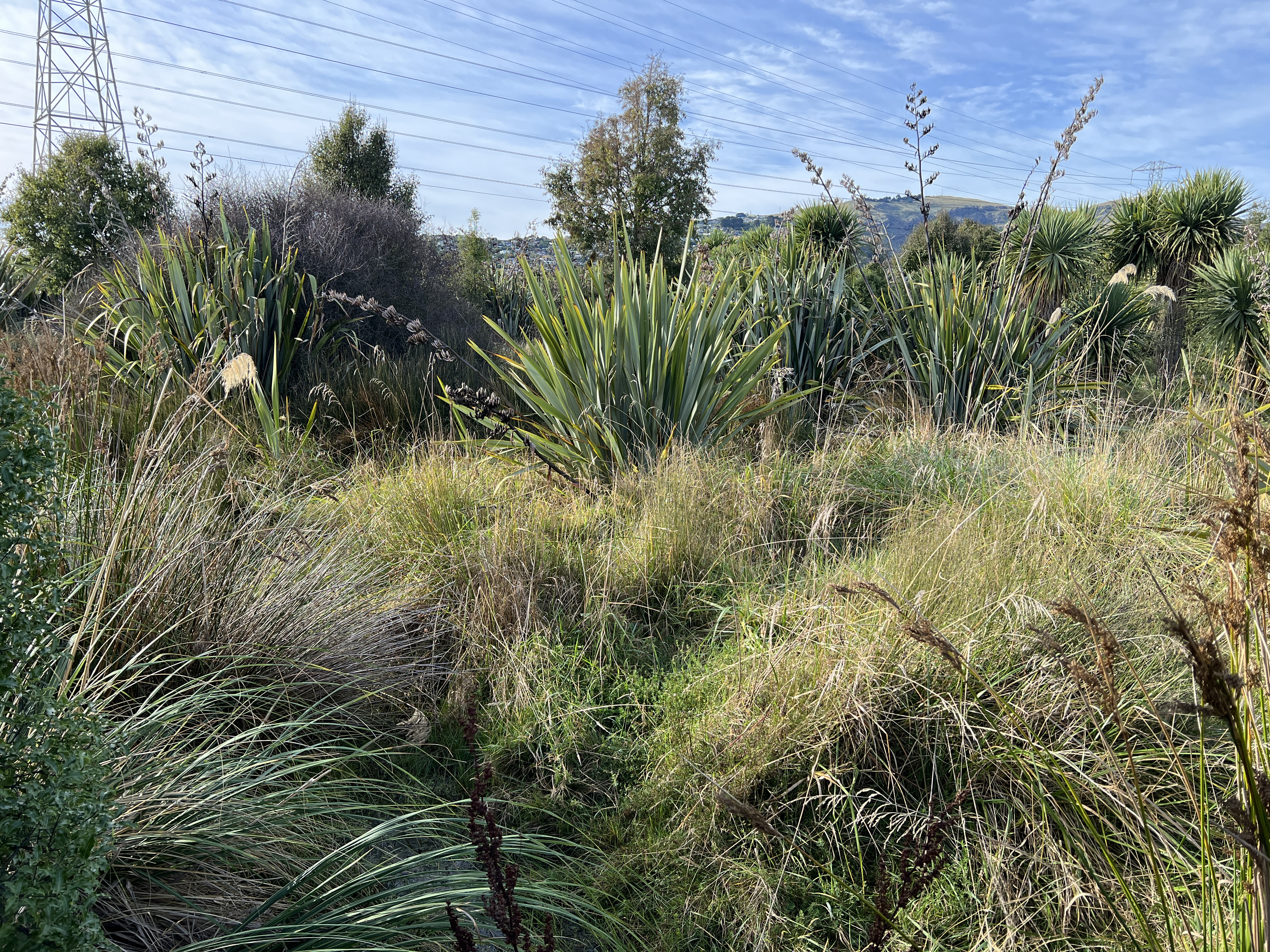
- Interactive map of Charlesworth Wetland Reserve
- Location: Avon Heathcote Estuary
- Nearest city: Christchurch
- Coordinates: 43.54°S 172.70°E
- Area: 20 hectares (49 acres)
- Created: 2004
- Etymology: After Captain William Charlesworth (1814–1875)
- Operator: Christchurch City Council

Charlesworth Wetland Reserve is a public conservation reserve in the estuary of the Avon and Heathcote Rivers / Ihutai in Christchurch, New Zealand.

== Geography ==
Charlesworth Reserve covers 20 hectares of land on the south-western edge of the Avon Heathcote Estuary in eastern Christchurch, New Zealand. To the north are the oxidation ponds of the wastewater treatment plant in Bromley, and to the south is the suburb of Ferrymead. The reserve is bordered by Humphreys Drive (a continuation of Linwood Ave) and by Charlesworth Street to the west. About half the reserve is estuarine mudflats draining into the Avon Heathcote Estuary, and half is replanted shrubs and trees creating saltmarsh, coastal shrubland, and patches of forest.

== History ==
Captain William Charlesworth (sometimes Charlsworth, 1824–1875) arrived in New Zealand in the 1850s and was involved in purchasing land to build the Ferrymead Railway. His main property alongside Ferry Road was called Saxon Farm, and his 14-room homestead Saxon Villa. By 1870, he was grazing 200 head of cattle on the drained wetland, which was damaged by a bad peat fire in February 1872. Charlesworth died from an accidental cut while felling trees in 1875. The road beside his land was known by this time as Charlesworth's Road or Charlsworth Road, becoming Charlesworth Street in 1892.

The drained farmland in the 19th century became an industrial area and housed factories manufacturing carpet, candles, and soap. By the 1920s, it had been cleared again for pasture. In the 1990s, the Christchurch City Council began converting the land from farmland into native wetland, digging out tidal pools and clearing the paddocks. This was done as part of a Green Edge project to reduce the amount of pathogens and sediment entering the estuary, and provide wildlife habitat.

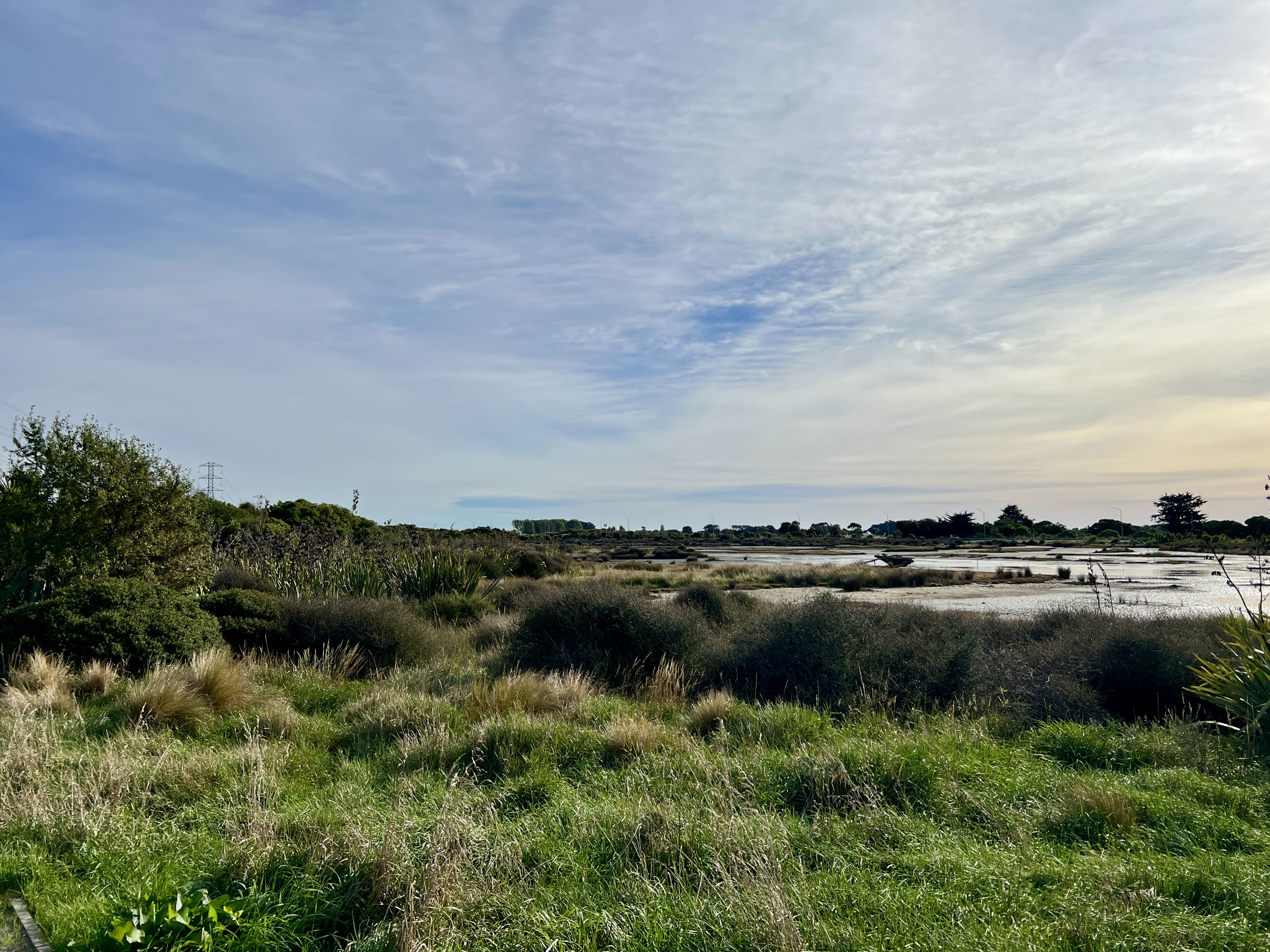
Human-created saltmarsh within the reserve

An existing culvert running from the estuary under Humphreys Drive was used to create an initial wetland area in the south-east corner of the reserve in 1991, allowing the sea to flood the area at high tide. This area was known as the "Sandpiper Pools". In 2001 the wetland was extended to a much larger area to the north known as "New Charlesworth", with islands and channels sculpted so as to be partially covered at high tide. Several species of saltmarsh plants were planted and others allowed to establish naturally.

== Ecology ==
=== Flora ===
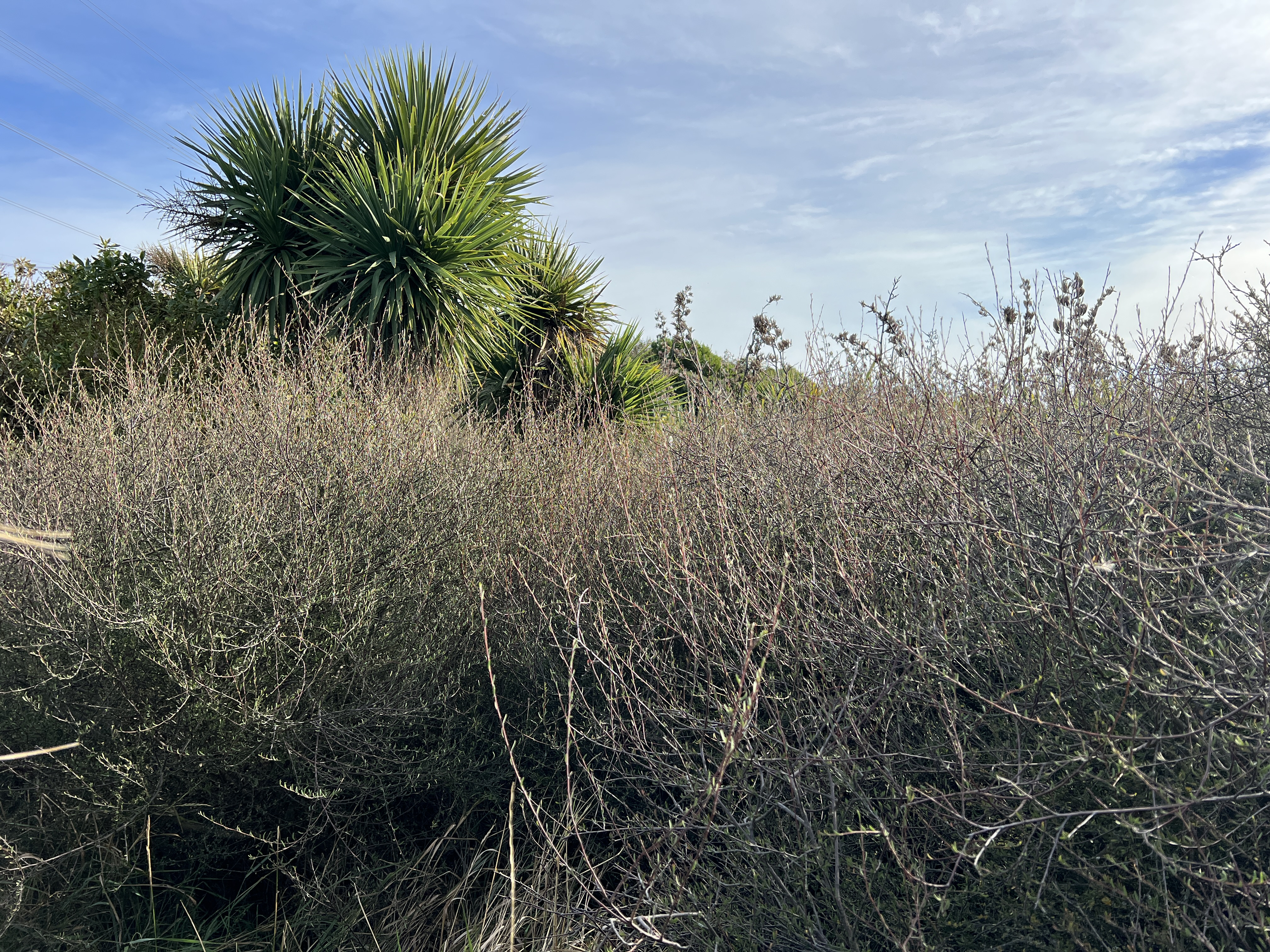
Saltmarsh ribbonwood (Plagianthus divaricatus)

At the beginning of the restoration project in 1991, the area was almost entirely pasture, with a remnant stand of runa / saltmarsh ribbonwood (Plagianthus divaricatus) persisting in the south-eastern corner of the reserve. Further Plagianthus divaricatus was planted, along with common sea rush (Juncus maritimus) and harakeke / New Zealand flax (Phormium tenax). Jointed rush (Apodasmia similis) was also planted but did not survive. When tidal flooding of the land began, several species of saltmarsh plants established themselves: glasswort (Salicornia quinqueflora), sea spurrey (Spergularia media) and selliera (Goodenia radicans).

After the 2010–2011 Christchurch earthquakes, parts of the harbour and surrounding suburbs experienced liquefaction and uplift, but Charlesworth Reserve did not show significant uplift, and the distribution of Salicornia did not change between June 2011 and February 2014.

=== Fauna ===
Invertebrate surveys of Charlesworth Reserve in 2015 and 2017 found 109 species of insect, and a 2020–2021 survey found 73. Undergraduate student Julia Palmer conducted a summer research project over 2021–2022, and counted 175 terrestrial invertebrate taxa. Between November 2021 and January 2022 she used a variety of sampling methods including pitfall traps, Malaise traps, and beating nets, and among other species found Alexander beetle (Megadromus antarcticus) and the wolf spider Allotrochosina schauinslandi, as well as the ground wētā Hemiandrus celaeno, a new record for this site.

The wetland restoration in the 1990s attracted a population of endangered tarāpuka / black-billed gulls (Larus bulleri) which started a small breeding colony. After the closure of the Bromley landfill, black-backed gulls (Larus dominicanus) that had been scavenging at the landfill began ranging further, discovered the tarāpuka colony, and decimated it; tarāpuka were also driven out to the nearby motorway and killed. The following year the black-billed gulls moved to the central city, and their main breeding colony in the area is now the Christchurch Seagull Pit; they no longer nest at Charlesworth Reserve.

McCann's skink (Oligosoma mccanni) has also been observed at the reserve.

== Management ==
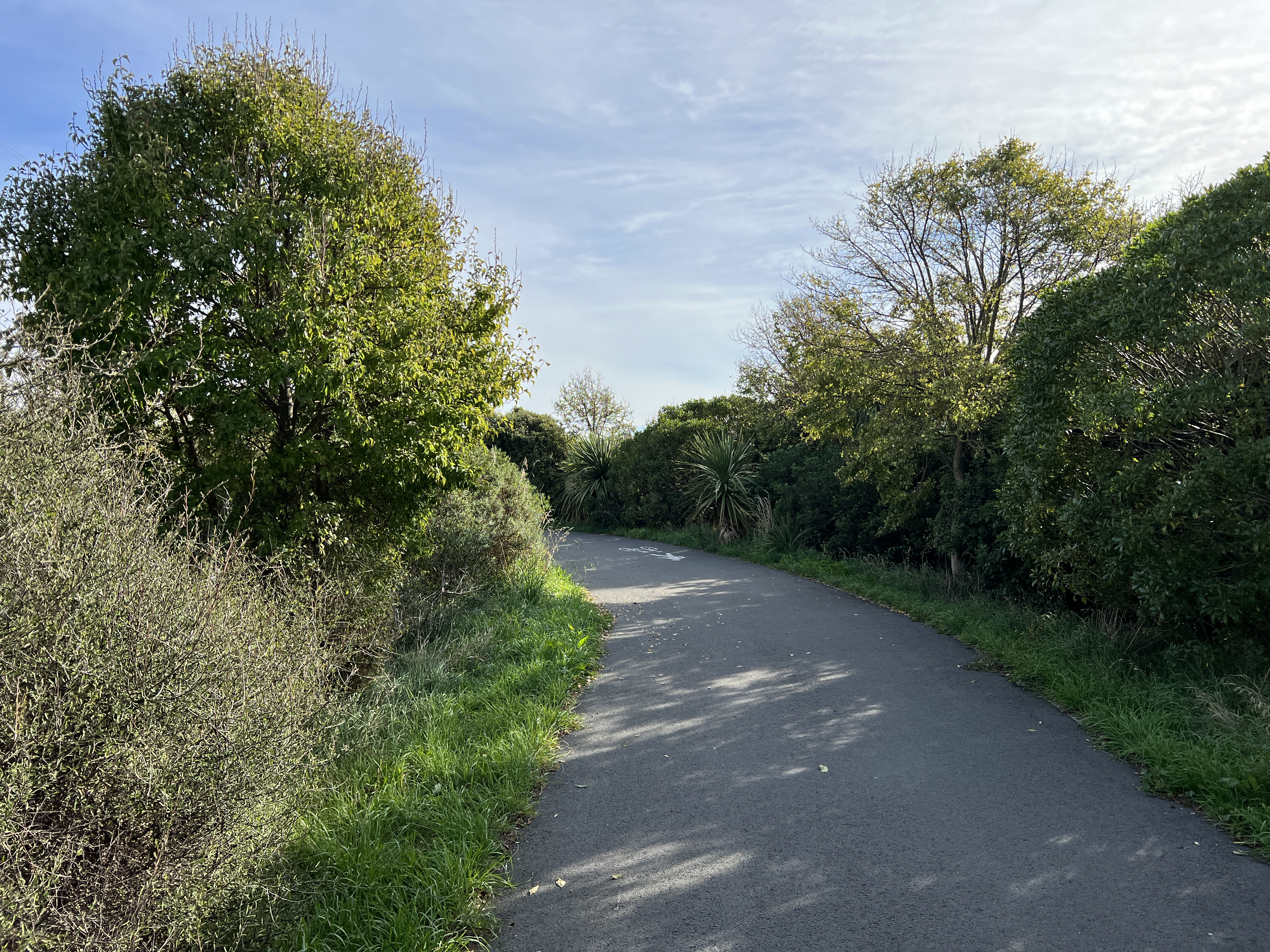
Cycle path through the Reserve

After restoration work by the City Council, the reserve was officially opened in 2004. In 2005, the Avon-Heathcote Estuary Ihutai Trust, formed in 2002, took on the reserve as a project and began a volunteer-driven planting programme. Since then over 130,000 native plants have been planted. Volunteers also regularly remove rubbish from the reserve; staff from nearby business Ferrymead Mitre 10 have adopted Charlesworth Reserve as a cleanup project. Pest control around the reserve is conducted by Christchurch City Council rangers using a mixture of traps and bait stations, mainly to protect ground-nesting wetland and shorebird species from predation.

In 2021, a section of the cycleway being constructed between Central Christchurch and Sumner was rerouted through the middle of the reserve, with the existing path being widened to 3 m (9.8 ft) and asphalted. Part of the reserve is leased by the charitable trust Trees for Canterbury, which propagates native trees for community planting projects.

== See also ==
- Avon Heathcote Estuary
