= Spencerville, New Zealand =

Suburb of Christchurch, New Zealand

Spencerville
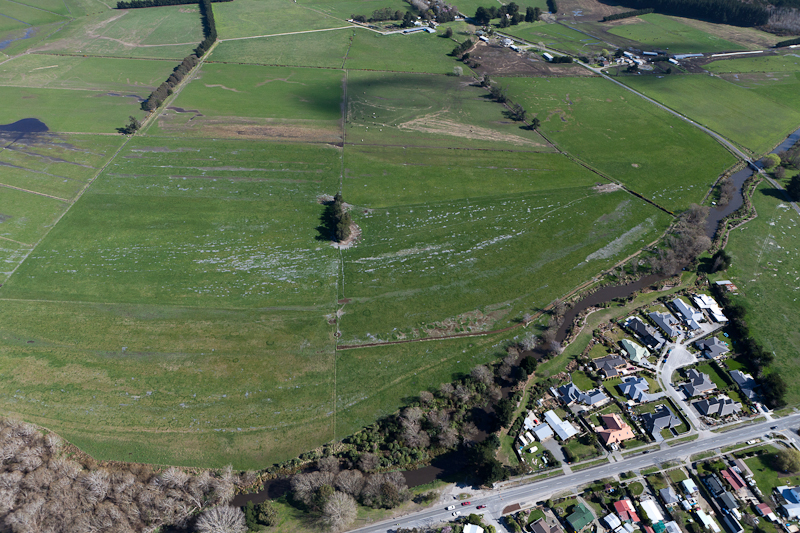
- Spencerville and the Styx River
- Interactive map of Spencerville
- Coordinates: 43.432042°S 172.697250°E
- Country: New Zealand
- Region: Canterbury
- Territorial authority: Christchurch City
- Ward: Coastal
- Community: Waitai Coastal-Burwood-Linwood
- Electorates: Christchurch East; Te Tai Tonga (Māori)

Government
  - Territorial Authority: Christchurch City Council
  - Regional council: Environment Canterbury
  - Mayor of Christchurch: Phil Mauger
  - Christchurch East MP: Reuben Davidson
  - Te Tai Tonga MP: Tākuta Ferris

Area
  - Total: 0.37 km^{2} (0.14 sq mi)

Population (June 2025)
  - Total: 600
  - Density: 1,600/km^{2} (4,200/sq mi)

Spencerville is a semi-rural village on the east coast of Canterbury, New Zealand north of Christchurch. The town backs on to Bottle Lake Forest and includes a large (1 hectare) park and 80 hectare camping ground. These amenities, as well as wetlands and an animal and bird park make the town a popular camping area for Christchurch residents.

After the 2011 Christchurch earthquake, the New Zealand Government classified Spencerville land as Technical Category T3. This requires repairers, builders and developers to meet stricter building standards.

== Demographics ==
Spencerville is described by Stats NZ as a rural settlement. It covers 0.37 km^{2} (0.14 sq mi) and had an estimated population of 600 as of June 2025, with a population density of 341 people per km^{2}. It is part of the larger Brooklands-Spencerville statistical area.

Historical population for Spencerville
Year	Pop.	±% p.a.
2006	576	—
2013	537	−1.00%
2018	549	+0.44%
2023	573	+0.86%
The 2006 population is for a smaller area of 0.34 km^{2}. Source:

Spencerville had a population of 573 in the 2023 New Zealand census, an increase of 24 people (4.4%) since the 2018 census, and an increase of 36 people (6.7%) since the 2013 census. There were 294 males and 279 females in 201 dwellings. 3.1% of people identified as LGBTIQ+. The median age was 39.3 years (compared with 38.1 years nationally). There were 120 people (20.9%) aged under 15 years, 108 (18.8%) aged 15 to 29, 282 (49.2%) aged 30 to 64, and 66 (11.5%) aged 65 or older.

People could identify as more than one ethnicity. The results were 90.1% European (Pākehā), 17.8% Māori, 4.2% Pasifika, 3.7% Asian, and 5.2% other, which includes people giving their ethnicity as "New Zealander". English was spoken by 98.4%, Māori by 3.7%, Samoan by 0.5%, and other languages by 7.3%. No language could be spoken by 1.6% (e.g. too young to talk). New Zealand Sign Language was known by 0.5%. The percentage of people born overseas was 18.3, compared with 28.8% nationally.

Religious affiliations were 29.8% Christian, 0.5% Hindu, 0.5% New Age, and 1.6% other religions. People who answered that they had no religion were 62.8%, and 4.7% of people did not answer the census question.

Of those at least 15 years old, 93 (20.5%) people had a bachelor's or higher degree, 276 (60.9%) had a post-high school certificate or diploma, and 78 (17.2%) people exclusively held high school qualifications. The median income was $44,300, compared with $41,500 nationally. 51 people (11.3%) earned over $100,000 compared to 12.1% nationally. The employment status of those at least 15 was 246 (54.3%) full-time, 78 (17.2%) part-time, and 21 (4.6%) unemployed.

=== Brooklands-Spencerville statistical area ===
Brooklands-Spencerville statistical area, which also includes Brooklands, covers 7.25 km^{2} (2.80 sq mi). It had an estimated population of 790 as of June 2025, with a population density of 109 people per km^{2}.

Historical population for Brooklands-Spencerville
Year	Pop.	±% p.a.
2006	1,746	—
2013	1,134	−5.98%
2018	735	−8.31%
2023	762	+0.72%

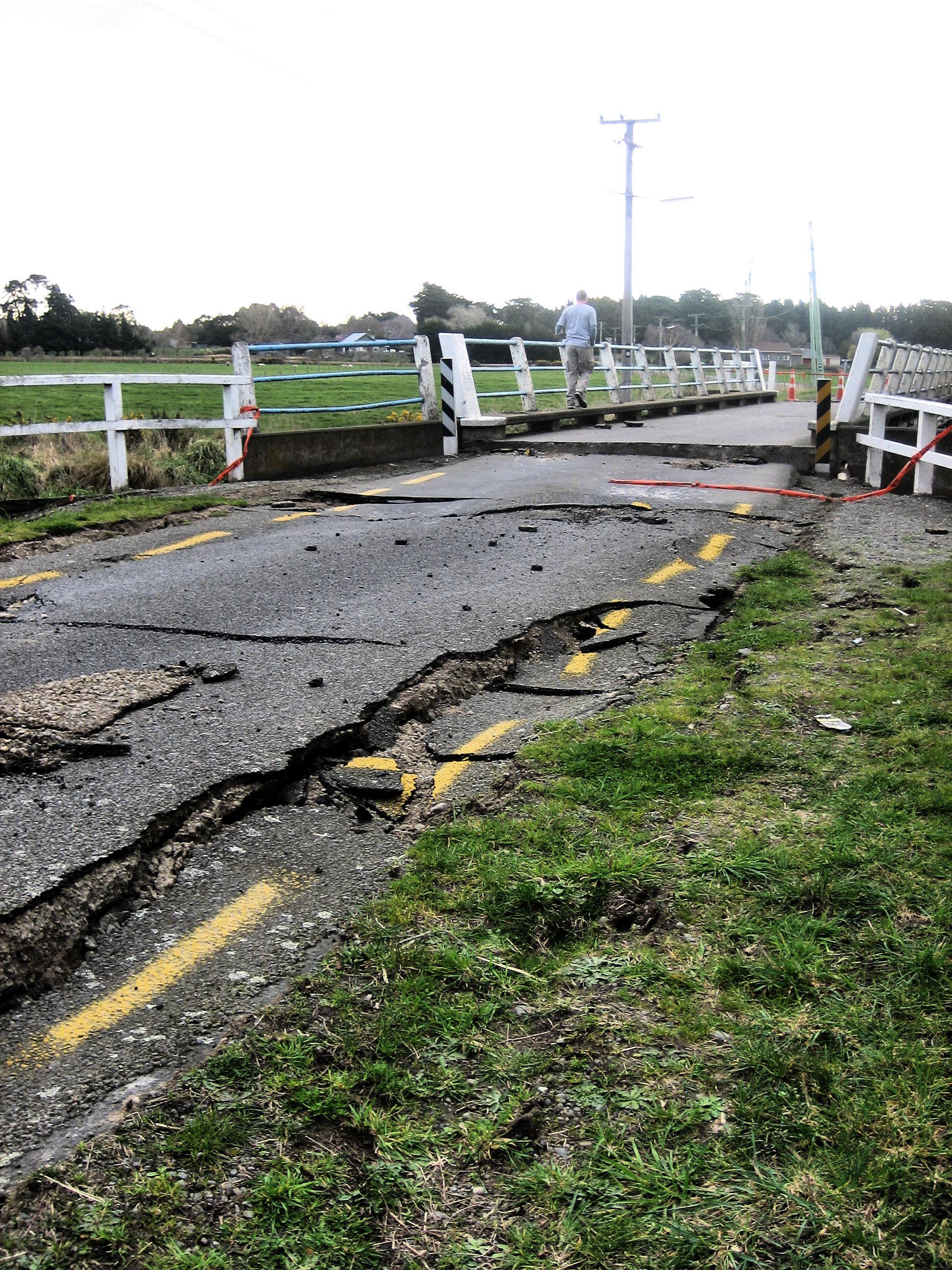
Damage to bridge on Spencerville Road crossing the Lower Styx river after the 2010 Canterbury earthquake

Brooklands-Spencerville had a population of 762 in the 2023 New Zealand census, an increase of 27 people (3.7%) since the 2018 census, and a decrease of 372 people (−32.8%) since the 2013 census. There were 384 males and 378 females in 267 dwellings. 2.8% of people identified as LGBTIQ+. The median age was 40.4 years (compared with 38.1 years nationally). There were 147 people (19.3%) aged under 15 years, 144 (18.9%) aged 15 to 29, 372 (48.8%) aged 30 to 64, and 96 (12.6%) aged 65 or older.

People could identify as more than one ethnicity. The results were 89.0% European (Pākehā), 15.7% Māori, 3.5% Pasifika, 4.3% Asian, and 4.7% other, which includes people giving their ethnicity as "New Zealander". English was spoken by 98.4%, Māori by 3.5%, Samoan by 0.4%, and other languages by 8.3%. No language could be spoken by 1.6% (e.g. too young to talk). New Zealand Sign Language was known by 0.4%. The percentage of people born overseas was 18.5, compared with 28.8% nationally.

Religious affiliations were 29.9% Christian, 0.4% Hindu, 0.4% Buddhist, 0.4% New Age, and 1.2% other religions. People who answered that they had no religion were 62.6%, and 5.9% of people did not answer the census question.

Of those at least 15 years old, 117 (19.0%) people had a bachelor's or higher degree, 378 (61.5%) had a post-high school certificate or diploma, and 114 (18.5%) people exclusively held high school qualifications. The median income was $42,300, compared with $41,500 nationally. 63 people (10.2%) earned over $100,000 compared to 12.1% nationally. The employment status of those at least 15 was 324 (52.7%) full-time, 105 (17.1%) part-time, and 24 (3.9%) unemployed.
