= Motunau River =

Coordinates: 43°03′S 173°05′E

Location
- Country: New Zealand

Physical characteristics
- Mouth
  - location: Pegasus Bay
- Length: 18 km (11 mi)

The Motunau River is a river of the north Canterbury region of New Zealand's South Island. It flows south-east from coastal hills south-west of Cheviot, reaching the Pacific Ocean at Motunau Beach at the northern tip of Pegasus Bay.

== See also ==
- List of rivers of New Zealand
