= Christchurch Wastewater Treatment Plant =

Wastewater treatment plant in New Zealand

Coordinates: 43°31′30″S 172°42′00″E

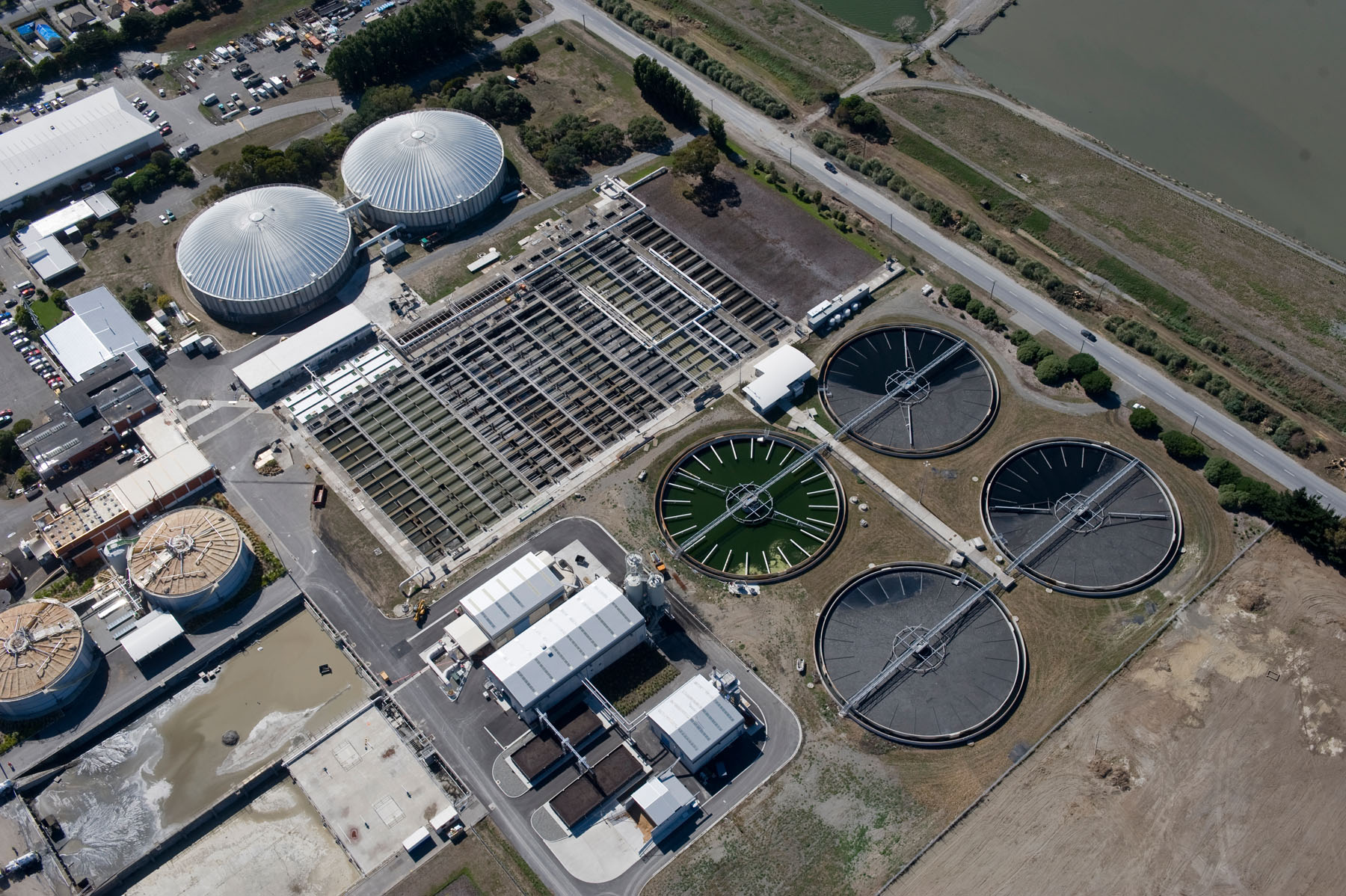
- the plant after the 2011 Christchurch earthquake
- Industry: Wastewater treatment
- Founded: 1882 (original); 1962 (modern)
- Headquarters: Christchurch, New Zealand
- Area served: Christchurch
- Owner: Christchurch Drainage Board (1882–1989); Christchurch City Council (since 1989)

The Christchurch Wastewater Treatment Plant (CWTP), also known as the Bromley sewage plant, is the main wastewater treatment plant of Christchurch, New Zealand. It is located in the suburb of Bromley, adjacent to the Avon Heathcote Estuary. Opened in 1962, it replaced an earlier sewage disposal farm that had operated since 1882. In late 2021, two trickling filters burned down and adjacent suburbs have since been subjected to a putrid smell.

== Sewage farm ==
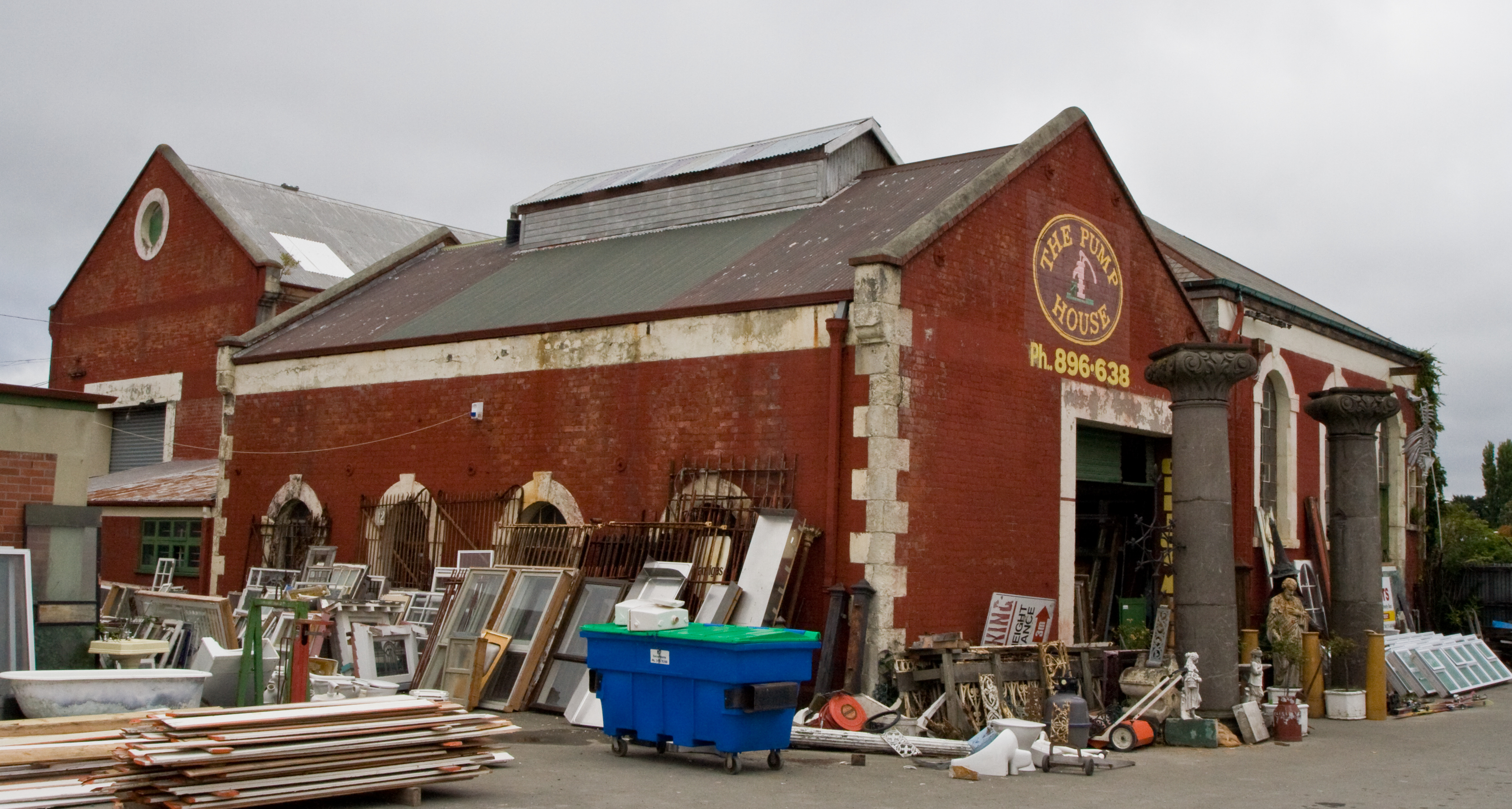
The Pumphouse in 2010

Before the modern plant opened in 1962, the Christchurch Drainage Board operated a smaller facility that was known as the "sewage farm". The Christchurch Drainage Board was set up in 1875 and its first chairperson was the then-mayor of Christchurch, Fred Hobbs, who defined the role of the organisation as such:

The Board's first duty is to remove away from the habitations and haunts of man that which is injurious and prejudicial to his health, and the second when they have got it away, to create as little nuisance as they possibly can with it.

The system was fully operational by late 1882. Sewage was disposed onto sandy soil and percolated through the soil into drains that, in turn, discharged into the estuary. The pumping station in Linwood's Tuam Street was a major facility to get the sewage to Bromley. Known today as the Pumphouse, it opened in 1882 and operated for 75 years.

== Current treatment plant ==
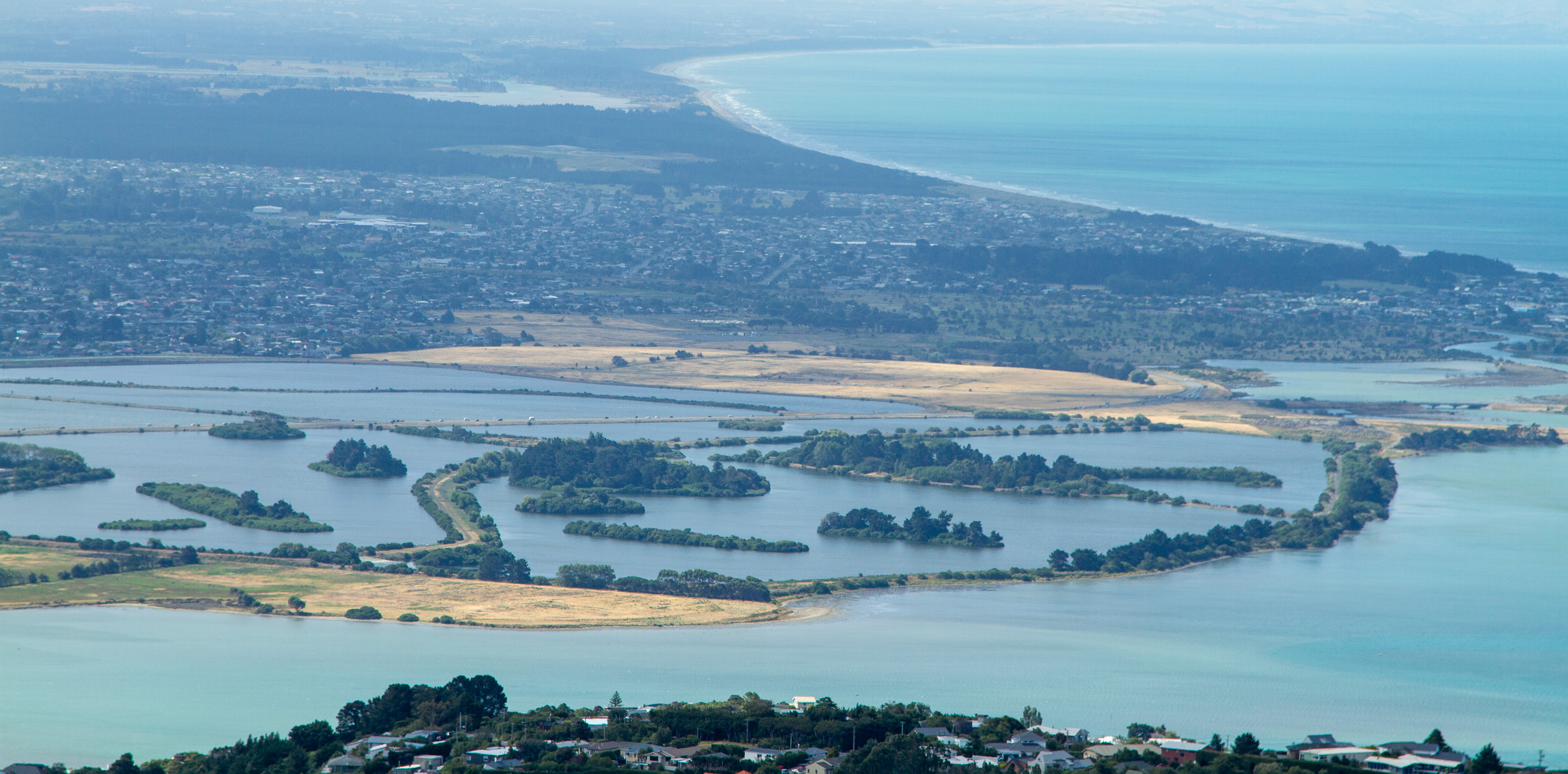
Oxidation ponds (centre) and the Avon Heathcote Estuary (bottom)

Map

The current plant was built between 1958 and 1962. The land the sewage treatment plant and its oxidation ponds is built on—covering circa 230 ha (570 acres)—was returned to Ngāi Tahu by the Native Land Court in 1868, only for the land to be taken again through the Public Works Act in 1958 by the Christchurch Drainage Board. Ngāi Tahu's land was part of its Ihutai reserve used for mahinga ika (Māori for fish gathering). The engineering design for the plant was prepared by consultants from the United States and the cost was NZ£1.35 million. Treated wastewater was discharge into the estuary over between two and four hours during high tide, for it to be washed out to sea with the outgoing tide. This method was not seen as acceptable any longer, as the high nutrient load caused sea lettuce to grow and when it rotted, it caused a putrid smell.

In 2005, Christchurch City Council obtained a resource consent for an ocean outfall. The ocean outfall became operational on 24 March 2010, 18 months behind schedule. The first 2.33 km (1.45 mi) of concrete tunnel were constructed through a microtunnelling machine built by Herrenknecht underneath the estuary and the suburb of New Brighton. The remaining 2.53 km (1.57 mi) were built from HDPE pipe and dredged into the seafloor. The pipe has a diameter of 1.8 m (5 ft 11 in) and the diffusers are 3 km (1.9 mi) off the coast from New Brighton. At a cost of NZ$85m, it was the largest ever undertaken by Christchurch City Council.

The Christchurch wastewater treatment plant was affected by the series of earthquakes that started in September 2010. After the February 2011 Christchurch earthquake, raw sewage reached the estuary from many broken sewerage pipes discharging into the Ōpāwaho / Heathcote River and the Avon River / Ōtākaro, creating environmental conditions worse than they were ever before.

=== 2021 trickling filter fire ===
On 1 November 2021, the plant's two trickling filters caught fire during building renovations. The roofs collapsed, leaving the biomass inside the filters exposed to the air. The buildings are 8 m (26 ft) tall and have a diameter of 55 m (180 ft).

According to Christchurch City Council "The trickling filters are a critical piece of the sewerage treatment process and the damage to them made the treatment process considerably less effective."

It took until mid-May 2022 before contractors started to remove the rotten biomass from the filters, a job that is scheduled to take until September of that year. Depending on wind and other weather conditions, adjacent suburbs and sometimes much of the city is subjected to putrid smells, made up of predominately hydrogen sulfide. The trickling filters were emptied of the rotting biomass by 12 August 2022.

According to Christchurch City Council "As a consequence [of the fire], Christchurch residents, particularly those downwind during the predominantly easterly winds, have experienced a significant increase in unpleasant odours. These smells initially came from the burnt trickling filters, but are now coming from the oxidation ponds."

On the 17 December 2021, the Council staff created a plan to convert two of the plant’s four clarifier tanks (or secondary contact) into aeration tanks. The Council says that this will help decrease the bad smells and improve the quality of the wastewater being discharged.
