= Bottle Lake Forest =

Forest near Christchurch, New Zealand

Coordinates: 43.4524°S 172.6950°E

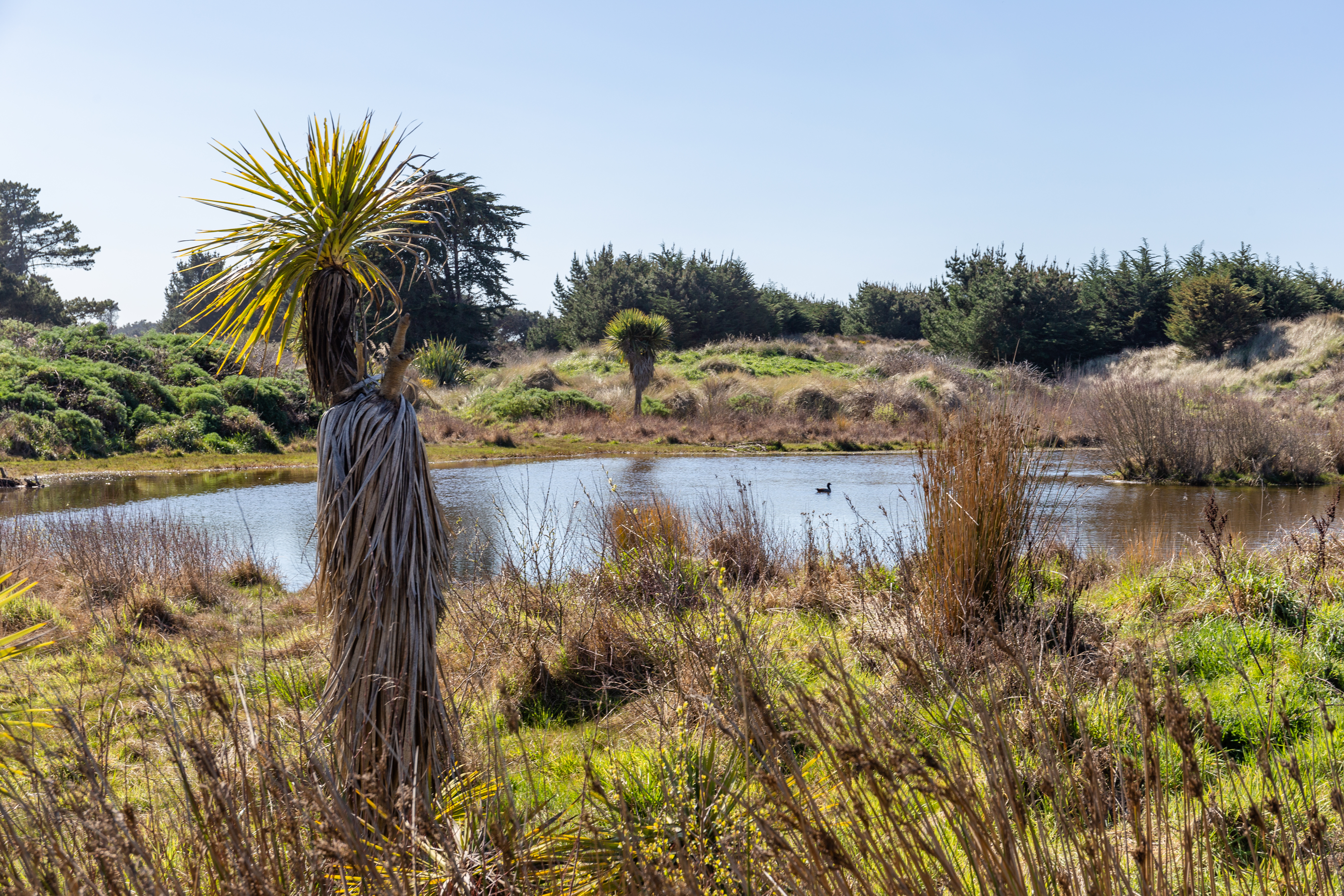
A small lake in Bottle Lake Forest

Bottle Lake Forest is a production forest and recreational park located in Christchurch, New Zealand, approximately 10 kilometres (6.2 mi) north-east of the city centre. It makes up the vast majority of the area of the suburb Bottle Lake. The visitor centre at the Forest's entry from Waitikiri Drive provides visitors with information about the different roles of Bottle Lake Forest. It also provides fresh water access, toilet facilities and parking.

== Production forest ==
The forest consists of Pinus radiata (pine) trees. It was planted in the early 1900s and covers 800 hectares of land, stretching from Burwood to Spencerville, and to Pegasus Bay on the East Coast. Trees are felled and logged in a 30-year rotation by the Selwyn Plantation Board.

== Forest and wildlife ==
Bottle Lake Forest also includes a number of native understory plants. Throughout the forest lies a carpet of indigenous moss, lichens, and common ferns – such as bracken, pigfern, chain fern, and water fern. Nearer the coast marram grass and tree lupin grow. During the autumn, wood mulch and pine needles provide a habitat for several species of mushroom.

Different species of bird can be found. Different stages of forest production provide different habitats, so bird life varies accordingly. There is currently a trapping programme to reduce numbers of cats, ferrets, and possums, as well as other pests, such as stoats, rabbits, feral cats, rats, hares, and stray dogs.

== Recreational Park ==
Bottle Lake Forest Park is also a popular free recreational park, with more than 400,000 visitors each year. Many tracks are provided throughout the forest, right up to a coastal track with ocean views and beach access. The tracks connect with those at Spencer Park, directly north of Bottle Lake Forest Park. The tracks consist of logging roads, which may be shared by all visitors, and dedicated tracks and trails for either hiking and walking, horse trekking or mountain biking. Directly at the visitor centre there is a BMX course as well as a trials setup.

The MTB track system is quite dense and provides diversity. Some of the tracks are oneway only to reduce the risk of collisions. The singletracks are typically narrow and seemed by trees of varying age. The track surfaces range from hard packed soil and gravel to loose sandy sections and may change due to the weather and usage. As Bottle Lake Forest is a production forest, it is not unusual that tracks get changed considerably or are closed during logging operations. Although the tracks do not feature serious ascents or descents, the narrow tracks, high speeds and curvy layout through tree plantations make it a popular and rather distinctive riding area. Racing series are held at the Park, too, with the "Twilight Series" being especially well-known.
