= Pegasus Bay =

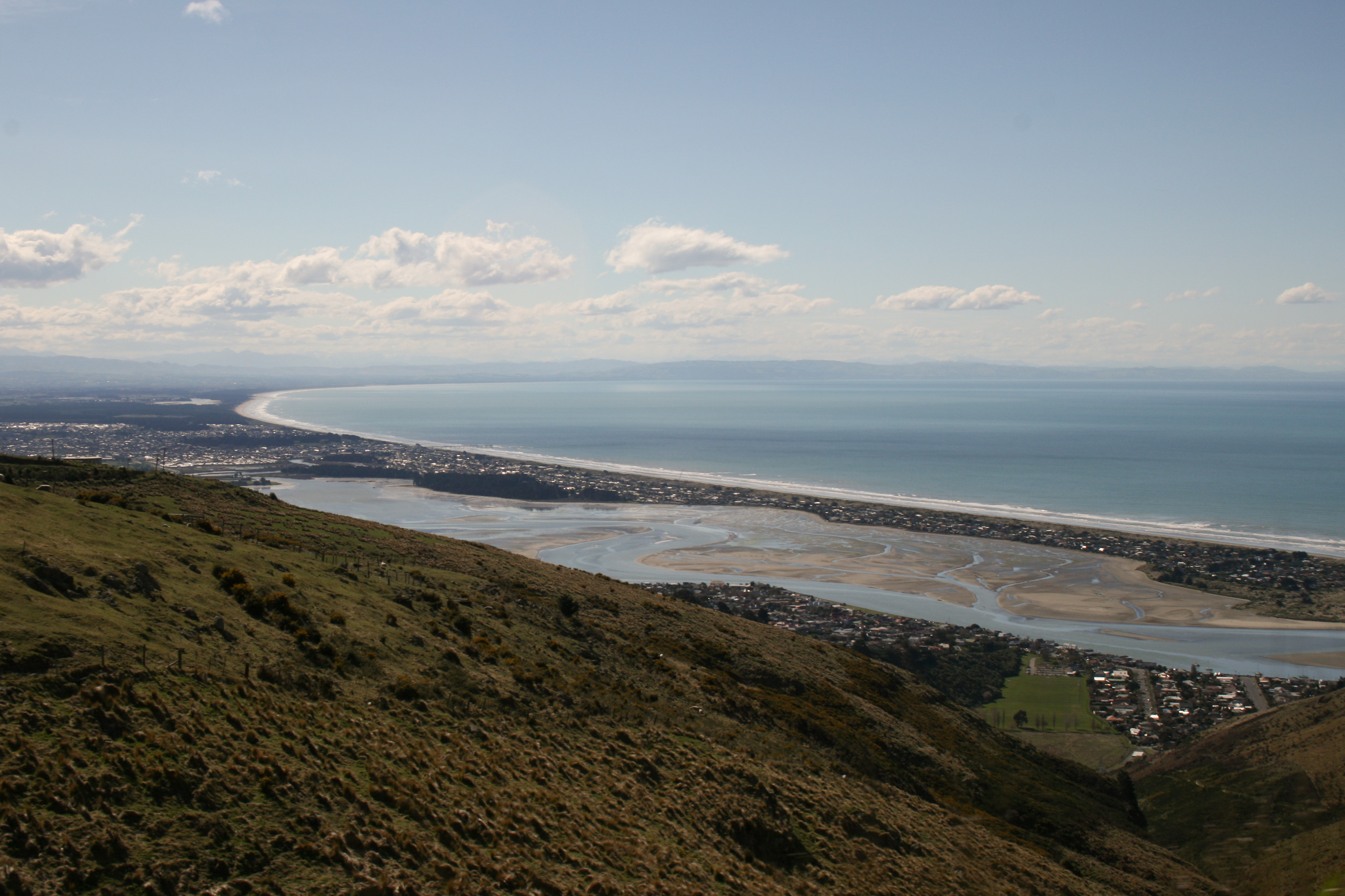
- Pegasus Bay, with New Brighton the spit in the foreground
- Interactive map of Pegasus Bay
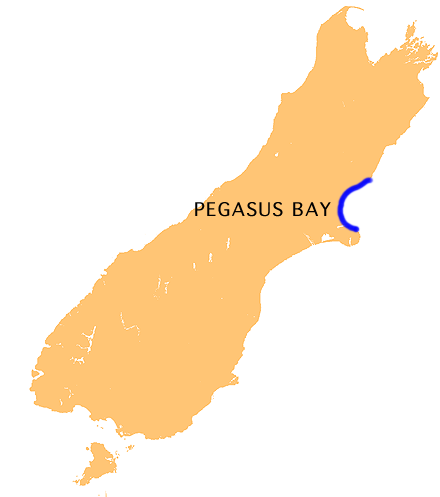
- Location of Pegasus Bay
- Location: South Island
- Coordinates: 43°20′S 173°00′E
- Type: Bay
- Part of: Pacific Ocean
- Basin countries: New Zealand

Pegasus Bay, earlier known as Cook's Mistake, is a bay on the east coast of the South Island of New Zealand, to the north of Banks Peninsula.

== Toponymy ==
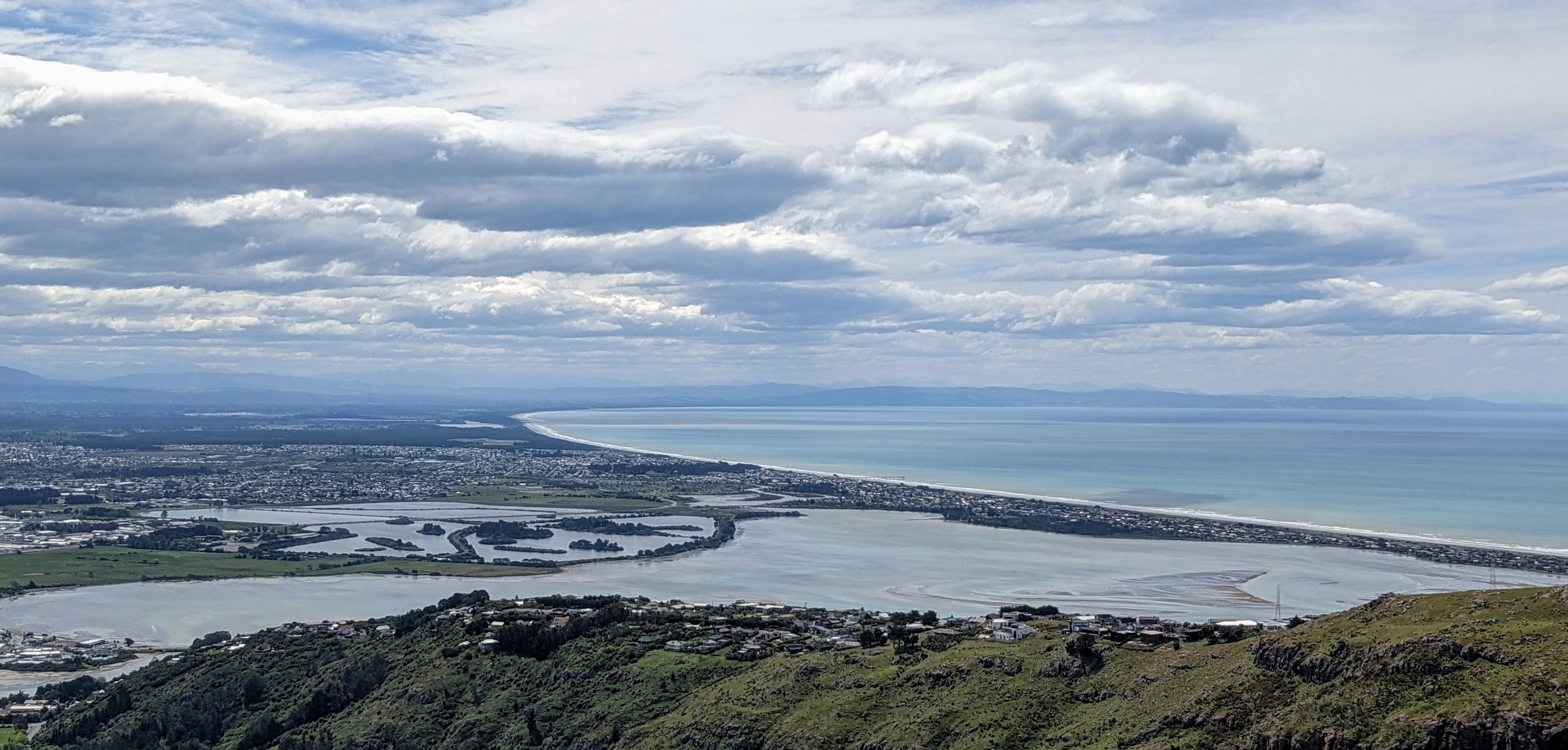
A view of Pegasus Bay, New Brighton, New Zealand from Mount Pleasant. 30 October 2022.

Pegasus Bay takes its name from the brig Pegasus, a sealing ship that was sailing from Hobart to London via the sealing islands and was surveying this part of the South Island in 1809. Attempting to sail into Gore's Bay shown on Captain Cook's map between the supposed Island that Cook had named after Banks, the crew discovered a mistake in Cook's chart and found the island was a peninsula connected to the rest of the South Island mainland by a low-lying isthmus. Fortunately they discovered this before trying to pass between the supposed island and the mainland before dark while approaching from the north and were still in about 27 metres (15 fathoms) of water. Captain Chace (or Chase) and his first officer William Stewart, who had also surveyed Stewart Island on the same journey, were reported in the Oriental Navigator in 1816. Charts made of this part of New Zealand from the 1809 survey give the names Cook's Mistake or Pegasus Bay to this large bay.

Māori do not divide this part of the coast in the same way, so there is no equivalent Māori name. However, the sandy beach on the shoreline between the Ashley River and Avon Heathcote Estuary is known as Kairaki (which is an ancient name of unknown meaning for the Pacific). While a fishing ground to the east of Pegasus Bay is known as Komaka a Te KaiKai a Waro meaning the foodstore belonging to KaiKai a Waro.

== Geography ==
Pegasus Bay lies on the east coast of the South Island of New Zealand, between the Motunau River and Motunau Island in the north and Banks Peninsula in the south. The bay is nearly 75 kilometres (40 nautical miles) across and 28 kilometres (15 nautical miles) deep, with 37 metres (20 fathoms) of water that gradually shoals to about 11 metres (6 fathoms) or 13 metres (7 fathoms) about 2 kilometres (1 nautical mile) from shore. The northern part of the coast are mostly cliffs, with stony or sandy beaches at low tide. The bay has a sandy beach that runs for about 50 kilometres (31 miles) from about the Waipara River mouth to the Christchurch suburbs of Sumner and Scarborough on Banks Peninsula.

=== Rivers ===
Rivers flowing into Pegasus Bay, from north to south, are:

- Motunau River
- Waipara River
- Ashley River / Rakahuri
- Waimakariri River
- Avon River / Ōtākaro and Ōpāwaho / Heathcote River via the Avon Heathcote Estuary / Ihutai

== Fauna ==
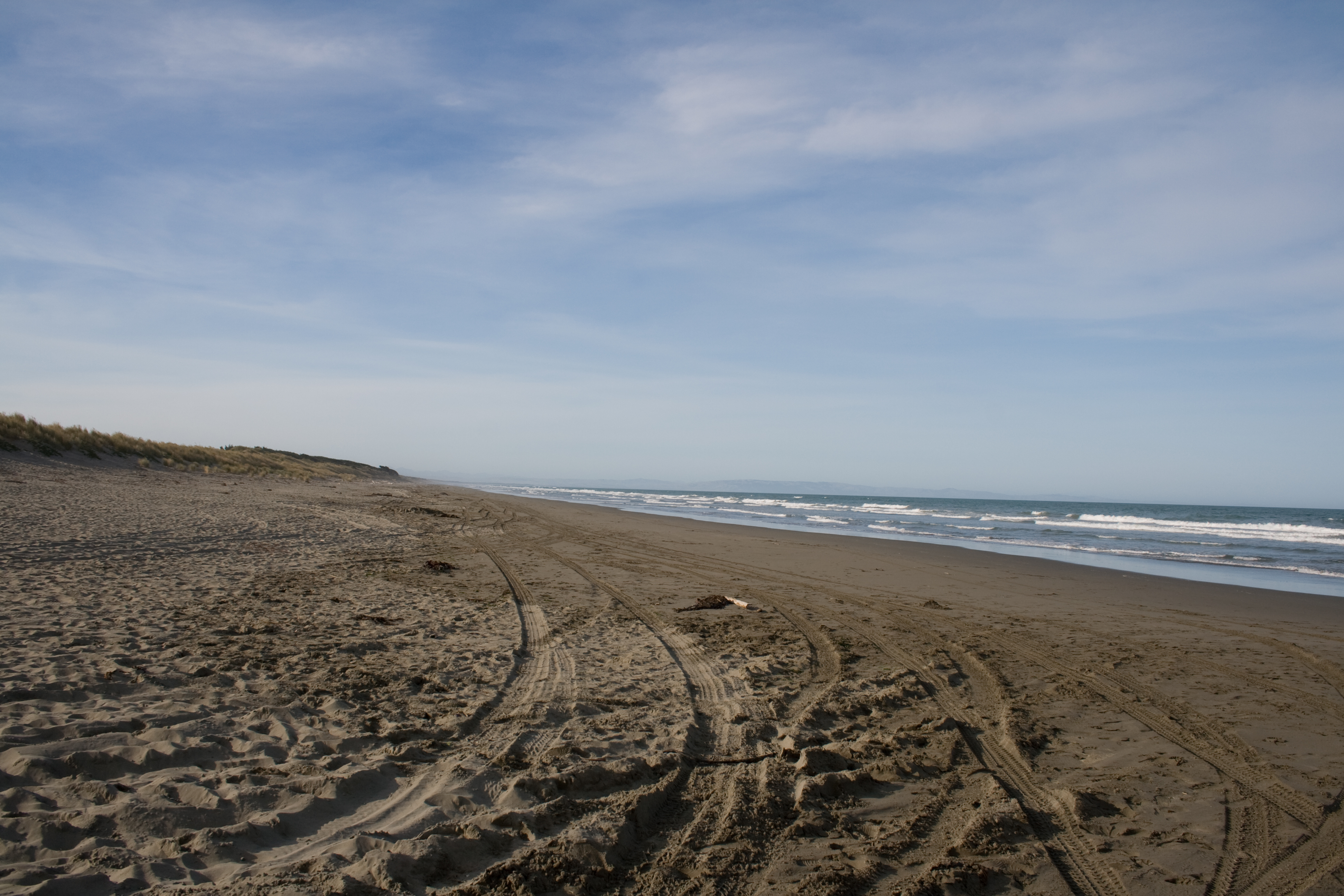
Spencer Beach, Spencerville

Other than dolphins including the endemic, endangered Hector's dolphins that regularly live or visit into the waters, whales such as southern right and humpback are known to migrate into the bay.

== Discovery ==
The Pegasus was the name of the sailing ship which surveyed part of the South Island in 1809. The brig Pegasus was the former Pegaso, captured at the Peruvian port of Trujillo on 28 July 1807 by the British frigate HMS Cornwallis, commanded by Captain Charles James Johnston, during a cruise against Spanish shipping and ports along the coasts of Spanish America. Johnston dispatched Pegaso to Port Jackson, where she arrived at the end of October. Submitted to the Court of Admiralty in Sydney, Pegaso, was condemned as a prize on 24 January 1808 and sold off, renamed Pegasus. A few months later she was acquired by Thomas Moore and in May of that year she was made ready to go on the sealing trade to the southern part of New Zealand. This expedition took place between August 1808 and March 1809, when Pegasus was commanded by Captain Eber Bunker. Pegasus went on a second expedition under the command of Samuel Chase from Port Jackson to London by way of the sealing grounds in southern New Zealand from May 1809 to August 1810: William W. Stewart was first officer and made charts of the New Zealand coast, including Stewart Island, which was subsequently named after him. William Stewart gave Pegasus Bay its name. The captain of the ship, Captain Samuel Chase (not to be confused with his contemporary, Captain Samuel Rodman Chace), lays claim to correcting James Cook's charts by determining that "Banks Island" was in fact a peninsula. As late as 1843, the bay was referred to as Cook's Mistake.
