= Marshland, New Zealand =

Suburb of Christchurch, New Zealand

Marshland
- Suburb
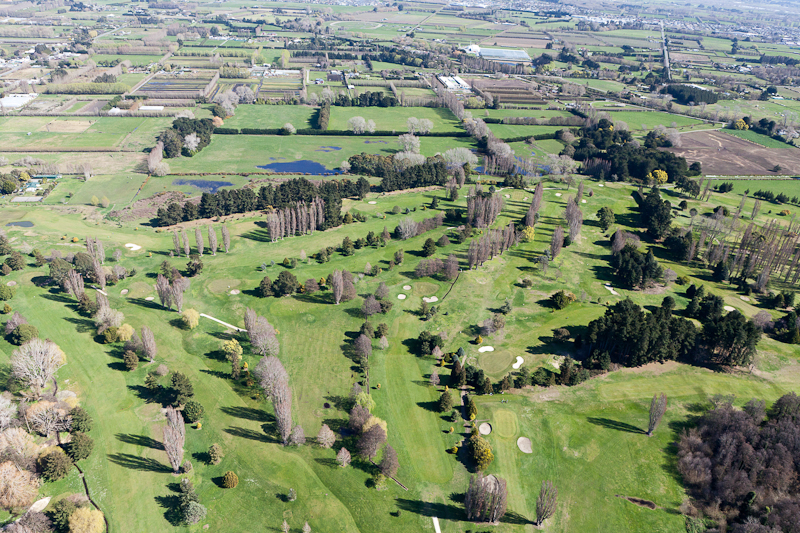
- Windsor Golf Course with Marshland in the distance
- Interactive map of Marshland
- Coordinates: 43.475°S 172.652°E
- Country: New Zealand
- City: Christchurch
- Local authority: Christchurch City Council
- Electoral ward: Harewood; Innes
- Community board: Waimāero Fendalton-Waimairi-Harewood; Waipapa Papanui-Innes-Central; Waitai Coastal-Burwood-Linwood

Area
  - Land: 896 ha (2,210 acres)

Population (June 2025)
  - Total: 1,540
  - Density: 172/km^{2} (445/sq mi)

Belfast	Kainga	Bottle Lake
Redwood	Marshland	Prestons
Northcote	Mairehau	Shirley

Marshland is a semi-rural suburb on the northern side of Christchurch city. The land is primarily used for horticulture and dairy farming.

The suburb is named for the peaty soil, and was also called Rhodes' Swamp after landowner and politician Robert Heaton Rhodes (1815–1884).

State Highway 74 forms the western and southern boundary of the suburb. The Styx River runs northeast through Marshland.

== Demographics ==
Marshland covers 8.96 km^{2} (3.46 sq mi). It had an estimated population of 1,540 as of June 2025, with a population density of 172 people per km^{2}.

Historical population
Year	Pop.	±% p.a.
2006	783	—
2013	768	−0.28%
2018	786	+0.46%
2023	1,161	+8.11%
The 2006 population is for a larger area of 10.11 km^{2}. Source:

Marshland had a population of 1,161 in the 2023 New Zealand census, an increase of 375 people (47.7%) since the 2018 census, and an increase of 393 people (51.2%) since the 2013 census. There were 570 males and 588 females in 426 dwellings. 2.1% of people identified as LGBTIQ+. There were 162 people (14.0%) aged under 15 years, 159 (13.7%) aged 15 to 29, 438 (37.7%) aged 30 to 64, and 408 (35.1%) aged 65 or older.

People could identify as more than one ethnicity. The results were 87.3% European (Pākehā); 8.8% Māori; 1.8% Pasifika; 7.8% Asian; 0.8% Middle Eastern, Latin American and African New Zealanders (MELAA); and 2.6% other, which includes people giving their ethnicity as "New Zealander". English was spoken by 98.4%, Māori by 2.8%, Samoan by 0.5%, and other languages by 9.6%. No language could be spoken by 1.0% (e.g. too young to talk). New Zealand Sign Language was known by 0.5%. The percentage of people born overseas was 16.5, compared with 28.8% nationally.

Religious affiliations were 42.4% Christian, 0.3% Hindu, 0.8% Islam, 0.5% Buddhist, 0.5% New Age, and 1.0% other religions. People who answered that they had no religion were 48.6%, and 6.2% of people did not answer the census question.

Of those at least 15 years old, 207 (20.7%) people had a bachelor's or higher degree, 549 (55.0%) had a post-high school certificate or diploma, and 240 (24.0%) people exclusively held high school qualifications. 129 people (12.9%) earned over $100,000 compared to 12.1% nationally. The employment status of those at least 15 was 384 (38.4%) full-time, 135 (13.5%) part-time, and 12 (1.2%) unemployed.

Individual statistical areas
Name	Area (km^{2})	Population	Density (per km^{2})	Dwellings	Median age	Median income
Marshland	7.99	675	84	228	41.5 years	$45,200
Burlington-Oakbridge	0.97	486	501	198	72.2 years	$31,700
New Zealand					38.1 years	$41,500

== Education ==
Marshland School is a full primary school catering for years 1 to 8. It had a roll of 557 as of March 2026. The school opened in 1888.
