= Redwood, Christchurch =

Suburb of Christchurch, New Zealand

Redwood
- Suburb
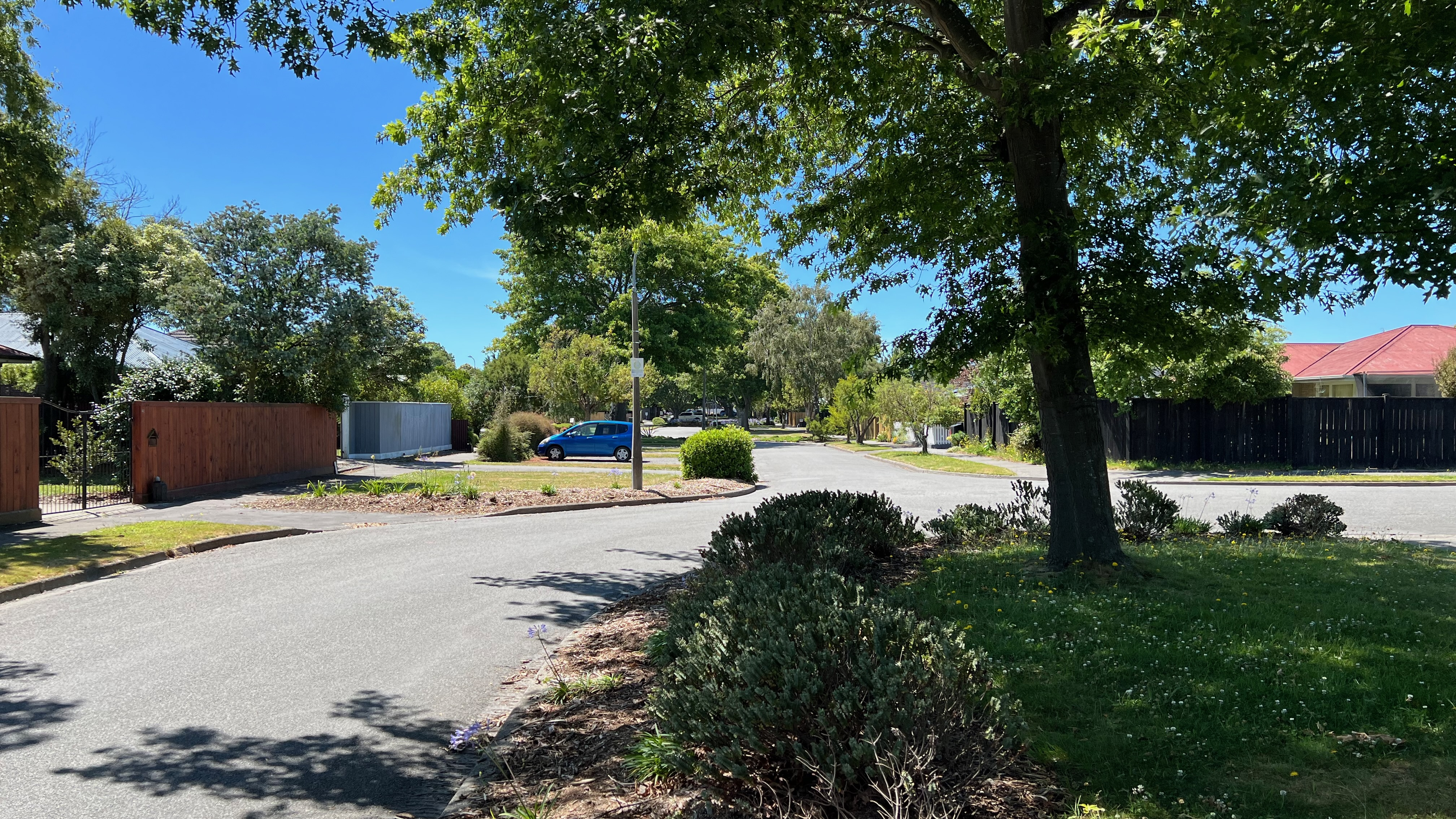
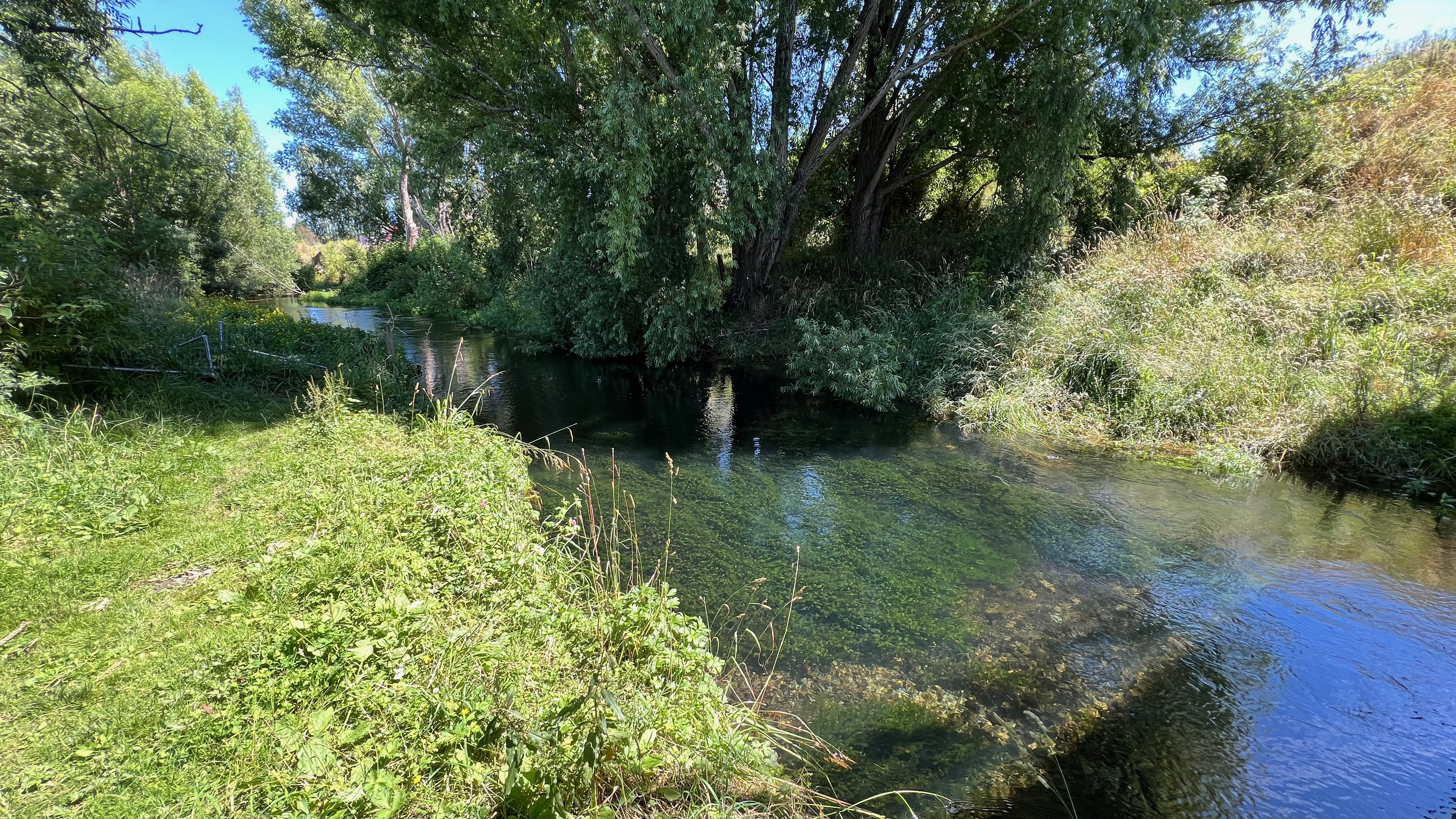
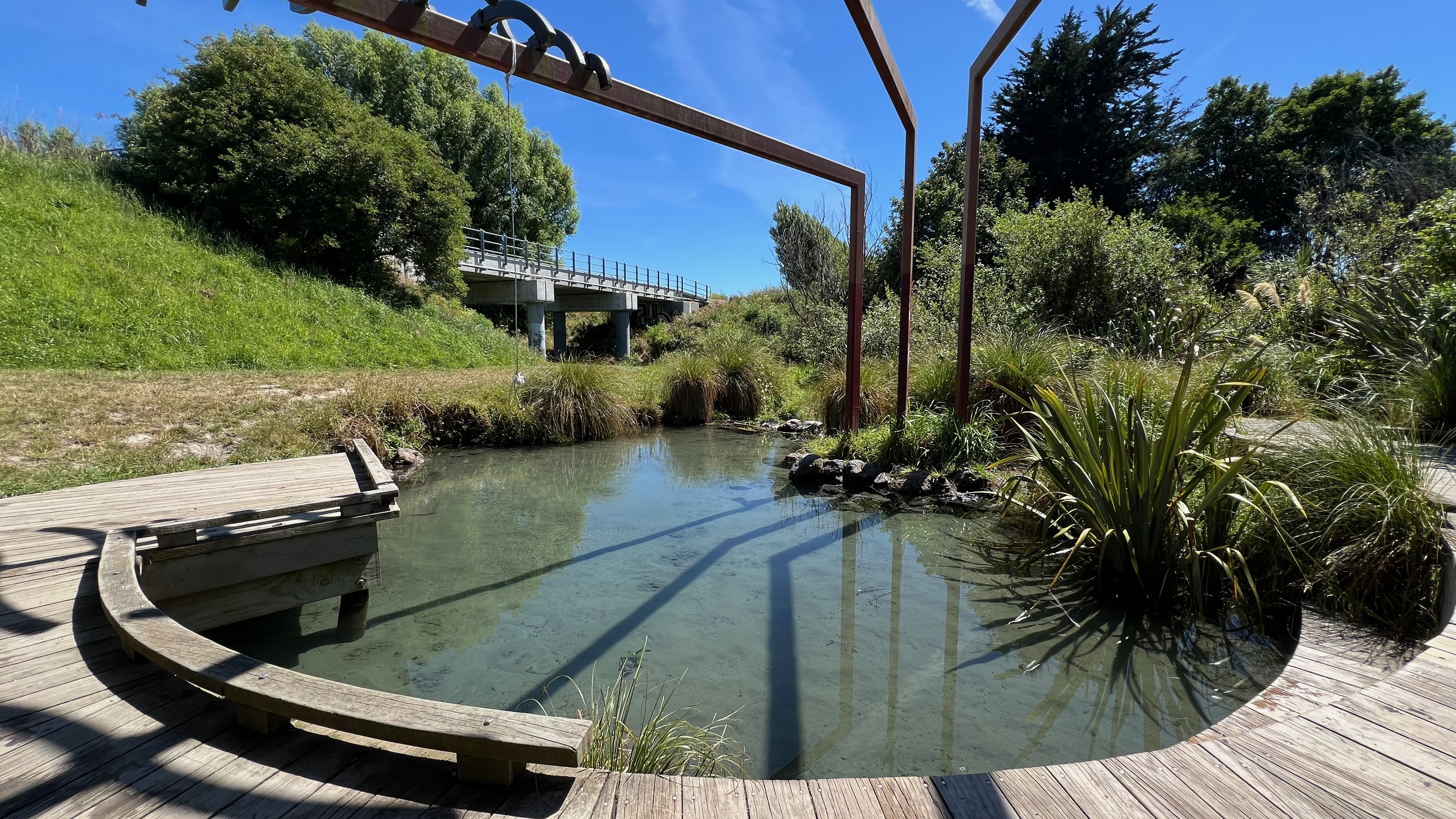
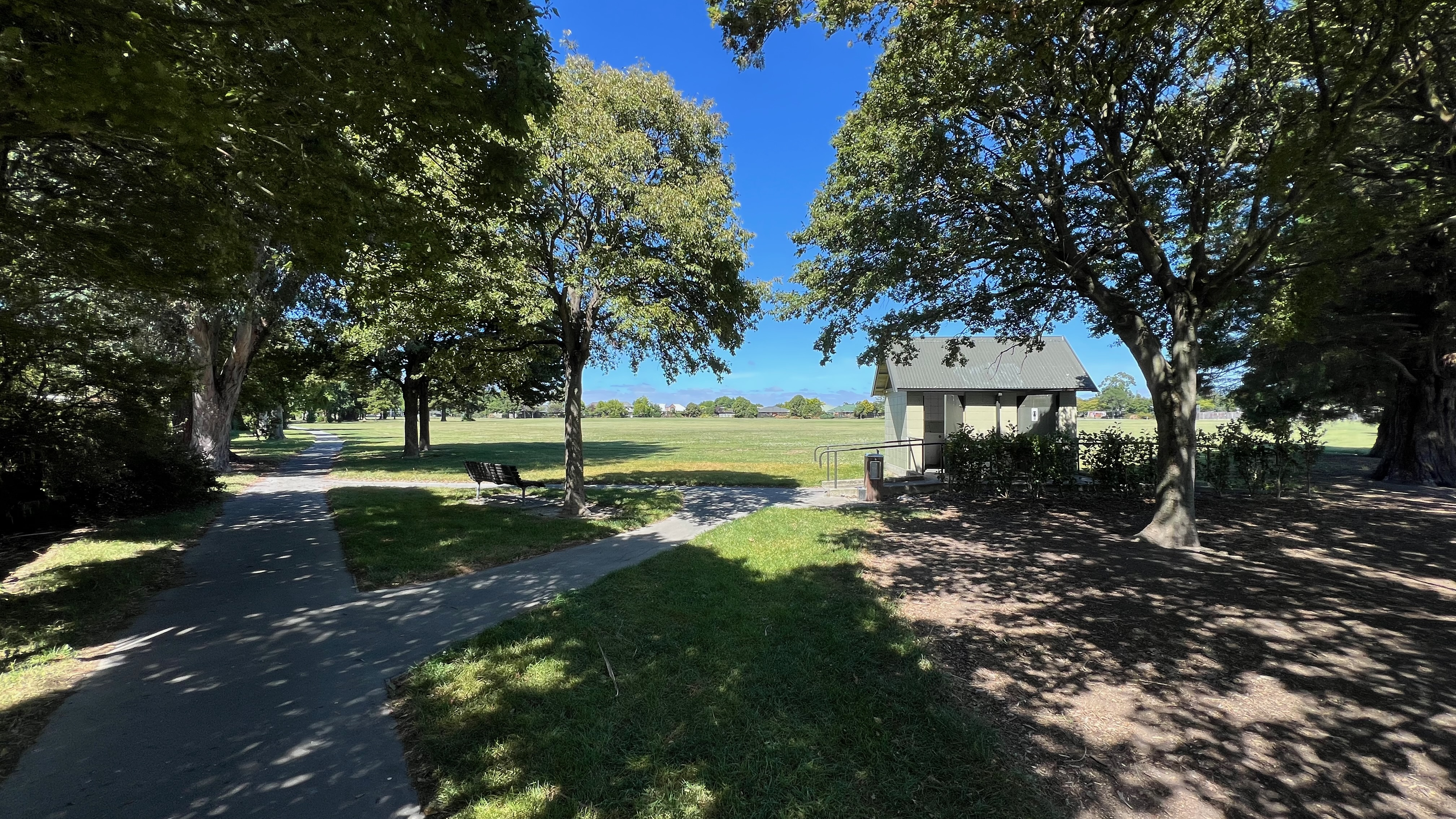
- Redwood, Christchurch in early summer
- Interactive map of Redwood
- Coordinates: 43.47660°S 172.61696°E
- Country: New Zealand
- City: Christchurch
- Local authority: Christchurch City Council
- Electoral ward: Papanui
- Community board: Waipapa Papanui-Innes-Central

Area
  - Land: 332 ha (820 acres)

Population (June 2025)
  - Total: 8,400
  - Density: 2,500/km^{2} (6,600/sq mi)

	Northwood
Casebrook	Redwood	Marshland
Papanui	Northcote	Mairehau

Redwood is a northern suburb of Christchurch, New Zealand, which includes the sub-division of Redwood Springs. It is bordered by the Styx River to the north. Before the area was settled the original forest cover was tōtara and kahikatea. Like much of Christchurch, the early settlers drained the swamps and cut the bush to create farmland.

The area was originally part of the Waimairi County but was amalgamated into Christchurch City Council as part of the 1989 New Zealand local government reforms. The Main North Road runs through the suburb, connecting it to both the Christchurch Central City and settlements further north including Belfast and Kaiapoi. Redwood is part of the Christchurch Central parliamentary electorate.

== History ==
Māori collected food from several areas in the Styx River catchment, but there appear to have been no permanent settlements in the area before European colonisation. The area was covered in low-lying raupō swamp and marshland.

Before the area was settled the original forest cover was Tōtara and Kahikatea. Like much of Christchurch, the early settlers drained the swamps and cut the bush to create useful farmland.

By the late 1950s many of the rural sections were being subdivided into residential houses. The row of shops near Prestons Road began opening in 1957.

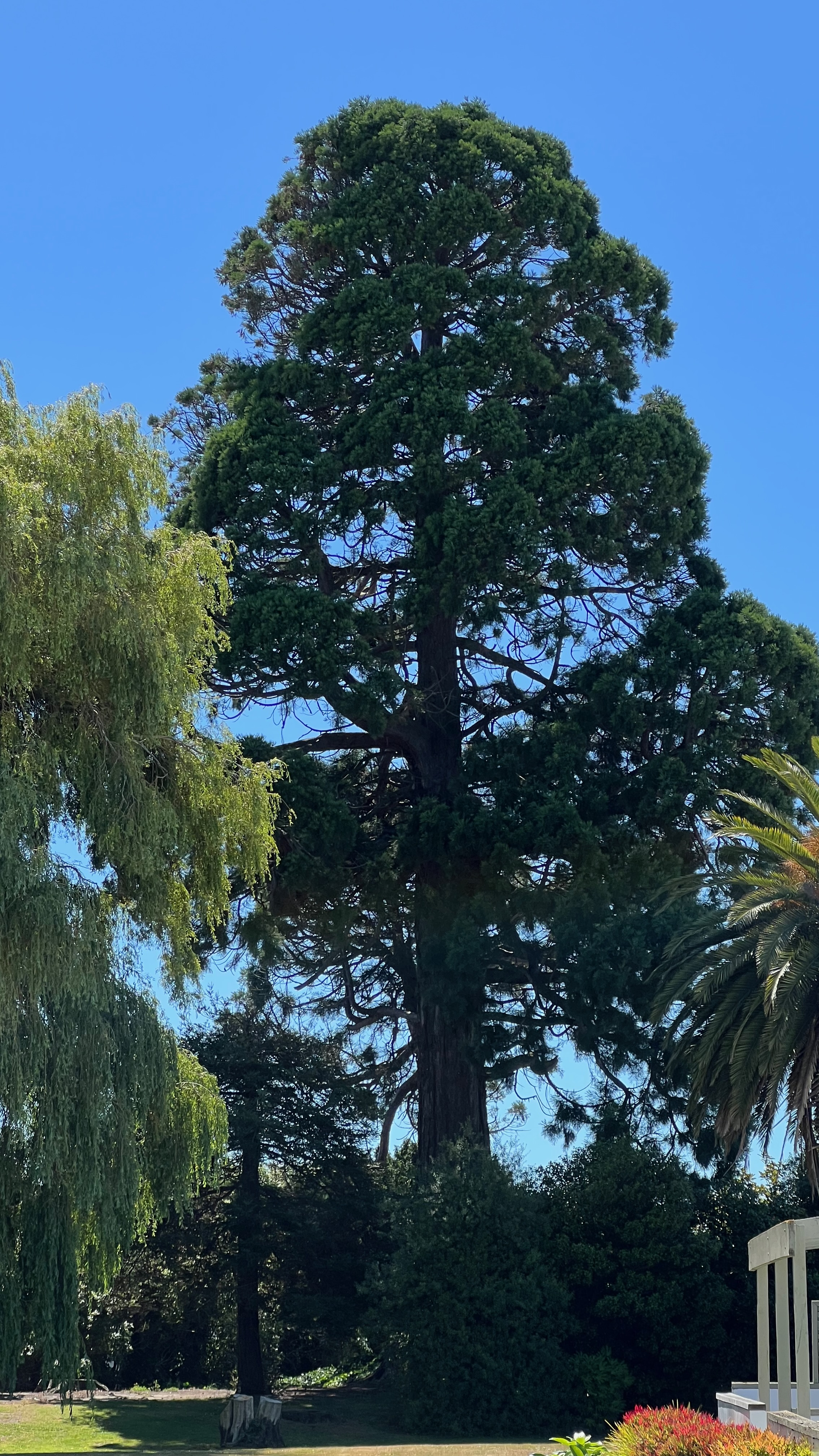
The suburb is named after a protected Redwood tree on Prestons Road

The suburb was first named Styx but renamed following a popular vote of local residents in the 1960s. Voters were asked to choose between Caselwood, Clearview, Northpark, Redpark and Redwood. The name comes from a large protected redwood tree still standing on Prestons Road. The tree was planted in the late 19th century by Thomas Preston, who was an early settler in the area and after whom Prestons Road is named.

The site of Redwood Park was purchased in 1960 to be used for a secondary school. By 1963 the plan for a high school had been abandoned. The land was made the Sturrocks Road Reserve, and was being prepared for a sports ground and kindergarten. By 1964 the plans had been extended to include a community centre. By the end of the year the sports field had been levelled and sown with grass. A bonfire was lit on Guy Fawkes Night to raise money for the project. In 1965 the industrial park on the corner of Sturrocks and Cavendish roads was established. In 1967 the reserve was renamed to Redwood Park.

The Redwood Public Library opened on 9 November 1968. The octagonal building was designed by Waimairi County Council architect Len Wooding. The library building also contains a child care centre. A public toilet and plunket rooms were also built in front of the library. The plunket rooms are now used by a community group.

The suburb underwent a rapid expansion beginning in the 1970s. The Redwood scout hall was constructed between 1978 and 1980. In 1986 a refuse transfer station was opened on the northern side of Styx Mill Road. The refuse station was the subject of some community pushback.

The area was originally part of the Waimairi County but was amalgamated into Christchurch City Council as part of the 1989 New Zealand local government reforms.

The suburb saw further growth in the 2000s, with the Regent's Park subdivision in the north-west, and the Redwood Springs subdivision in the north-east.

Redwood has its own community radio station called Classic Gold Radio Redwood 107.5FM.

== Demographics ==
Redwood covers 3.32 km^{2} (1.28 sq mi). It had an estimated population of 8,400 as of June 2025, with a population density of 2,530 people per km^{2}.

Historical population
Year	Pop.	±% p.a.
2006	8,331	—
2013	8,112	−0.38%
2018	8,184	+0.18%
2023	8,076	−0.27%

Redwood had a population of 8,076 in the 2023 New Zealand census, a decrease of 108 people (−1.3%) since the 2018 census, and a decrease of 36 people (−0.4%) since the 2013 census. There were 3,921 males, 4,125 females, and 30 people of other genders in 3,105 dwellings. 3.4% of people identified as LGBTIQ+. The median age was 38.5 years (compared with 38.1 years nationally). There were 1,419 people (17.6%) aged under 15 years, 1,563 (19.4%) aged 15 to 29, 3,768 (46.7%) aged 30 to 64, and 1,326 (16.4%) aged 65 or older.

People could identify as more than one ethnicity. The results were 81.2% European (Pākehā); 12.8% Māori; 3.7% Pasifika; 12.0% Asian; 1.4% Middle Eastern, Latin American and African New Zealanders (MELAA); and 2.5% other, which includes people giving their ethnicity as "New Zealander". English was spoken by 96.0%, Māori by 2.6%, Samoan by 1.1%, and other languages by 11.9%. No language could be spoken by 2.3% (e.g. too young to talk). New Zealand Sign Language was known by 0.9%. The percentage of people born overseas was 19.8, compared with 28.8% nationally.

Religious affiliations were 32.9% Christian, 1.5% Hindu, 0.5% Islam, 0.6% Māori religious beliefs, 0.7% Buddhist, 0.4% New Age, 0.1% Jewish, and 1.9% other religions. People who answered that they had no religion were 54.6%, and 6.9% of people did not answer the census question.

Of those at least 15 years old, 1,254 (18.8%) people had a bachelor's or higher degree, 3,624 (54.4%) had a post-high school certificate or diploma, and 1,773 (26.6%) people exclusively held high school qualifications. The median income was $40,500, compared with $41,500 nationally. 537 people (8.1%) earned over $100,000 compared to 12.1% nationally. The employment status of those at least 15 was 3,393 (51.0%) full-time, 903 (13.6%) part-time, and 189 (2.8%) unemployed.

Individual statistical areas
Name	Area (km^{2})	Population	Density (per km^{2})	Dwellings	Median age	Median income
Redwood North	1.14	2,676	2,347	999	40.4 years	$45,200
Redwood West	0.82	2,154	2,627	831	36.8 years	$37,800
Redwood East	1.36	3,246	2.387	1,275	38.6 years	$38,700
New Zealand					38.1 years	$41,500

== Politics ==
Redwood is part of the Christchurch Central parliamentary electorate. The currently elected member of parliament is Duncan Webb of the Labour party.

Redwood is part of the Papanui Ward for Christchurch City Council local body elections. The currently elected councillor is Victoria Henstock. The area is also represented by the Waipapa Papanui-Innes-Central community board.

== Transport ==
The Main North Road is a major four-lane arterial road that runs north-south through the middle of Redwood, connecting it to both the Christchurch Central City and suburbs further north including Belfast and Kaiapoi. The Christchurch Northern Motorway runs north-south just to the east of Redwood, allowing traffic to bypass the suburb. Environment Canterbury operates several bus services that serve Redwood, including the 1, 95, 107 and 125.

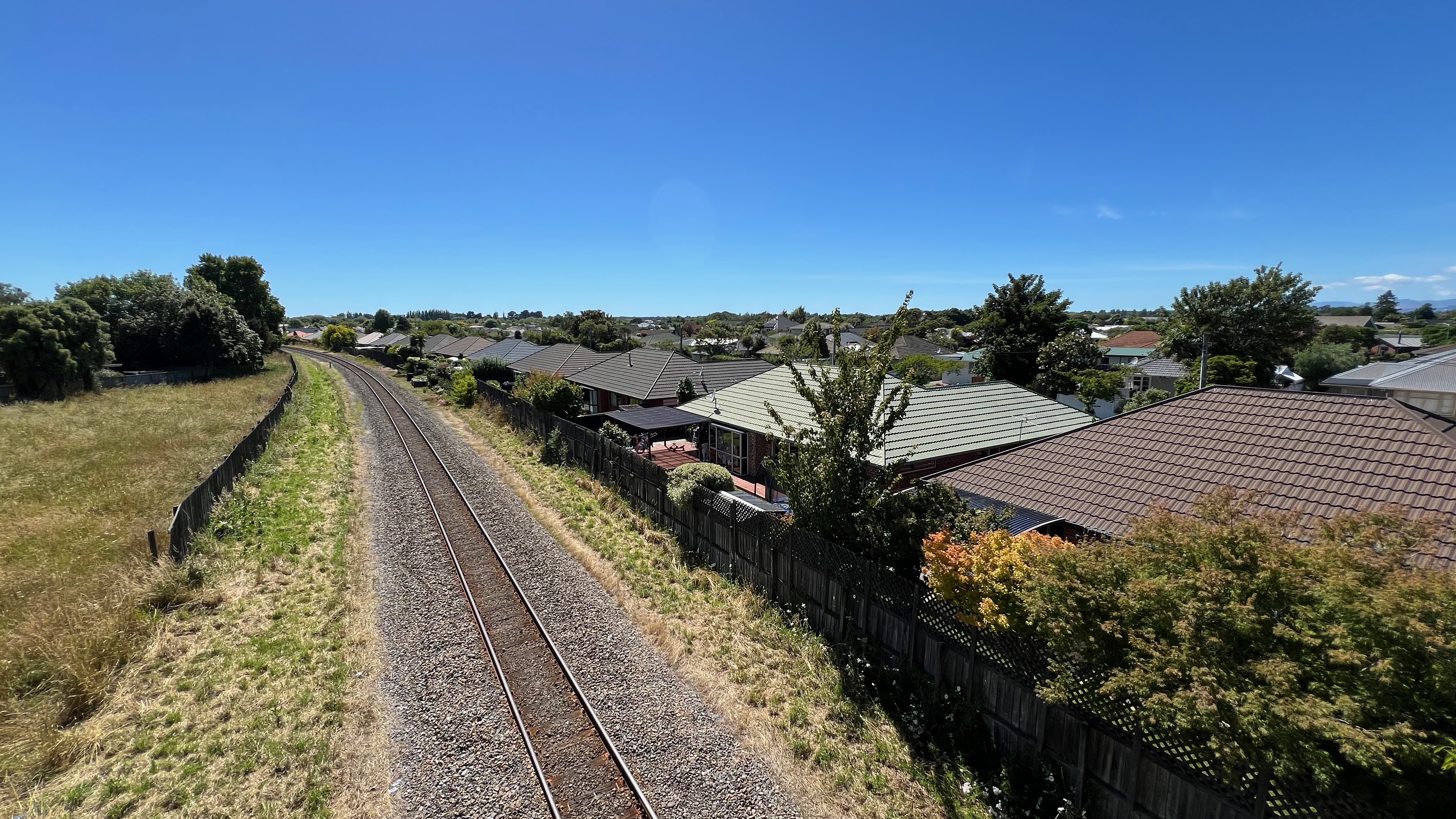
Main North Line viewed from the Styx overbridge

The Styx overbridge on Main North Road was first constructed in the mid 1930s. A second bridge was added alongside the first in 2004 to widen the road.

The Main North Railway passes through Redwood. Redwood was the location of the Styx railway station which was open to passengers between 1872 and 1977. The station was located in the area of the Redwood Springs subdivision, near the Styx overbridge. The station was finally closed in 1984.

Alongside the rail tracks west of Main North Road is the Christchurch Northern Line Cycleway that connects Redwood to the central city. The cycle path extends north through Redwood to connect to Main North Road in Belfast.

== Education ==
Redwood School and Northcote School are contributing primary schools catering for years 1 to 6. They have rolls of 271 and 147, respectively. Redwood School opened in 1969, and Northcote in 1960. Papanui High School is the major public high school zoned for the area. St. Bedes College, a special-character integrated Catholic boys boarding school is also located in Redwood.
