= List of rail trails in New Zealand =

This is a list of rail trails in New Zealand.

Name	Region	Length	Location	References			
Name	Region	Length	Location	Christchurch Railway Cycleway	Canterbury	6 km (3.7 mi)	Between Riccarton and Northcote, Christchurch City
Coppermine Trail (Dun Mountain)	Nelson	38.7 km (24.0 mi)	From Brook Valley to Maitai Valley, Nelson City				
Hauraki Rail Trail	Waikato	149 km (93 mi)	From Kaiaua to Matamata				
Little River Rail Trail	Canterbury	50 km (31 mi)	Hornby, Christchurch, to Little River, Banks Peninsula				
Otago Central Rail Trail	Otago	150 km (93 mi)	Middlemarch to Clyde				
Remutaka Rail Trail	Wellington	18 km (11 mi)	Kaitoke to Cross Creek, Wairarapa				
Timber Trail	Waikato/Manawatū-Whanganui	84 km (52 mi)	Pureora to Ongarue				

== See also ==
- Hiking in New Zealand
- New Zealand Great Walks
- New Zealand tramping tracks
