= Prestons, New Zealand =

Suburb of Christchurch, New Zealand

Prestons
- Suburb
- Interactive map of Prestons
- Coordinates: 43.474°S 172.669°E
- Country: New Zealand
- City: Christchurch
- Local authority: Christchurch City Council
- Electoral ward: Burwood
- Community board: Waitai Coastal-Burwood-Linwood

Area
  - Land: 407 ha (1,010 acres)

Population (June 2025)
  - Total: 5,320
  - Density: 1,310/km^{2} (3,390/sq mi)

Belfast	Bottle Lake
Marshland	Prestons	Parklands
Mairehau	Shirley	Burwood

Prestons is a suburb on the northeastern side of Christchurch city.

The suburb is named for Thomas Herbert Preston (1824–1884), a local resident and chair of the Avon Road Board. It was first planned as a residential suburb in 2007, and constructed in the 2010s.

The suburb has a main exit to Preston Road at the north, and a minor one to the east. An exit to the south to reduce congestion was delayed by disagreements over the intersection design. The new exit opened in 2024.

== Demographics ==
Prestons covers 4.07 km^{2} (1.57 sq mi). It had an estimated population of 5,320 as of June 2025, with a population density of 1,307 people per km^{2}.

Historical population
Year	Pop.	±% p.a.
2006	162	—
2013	243	+5.96%
2018	3,048	+65.84%
2023	4,863	+9.79%
The 2006 population is for a smaller area of 3.98 km^{2}. Source:

Prestons had a population of 4,863 in the 2023 New Zealand census, an increase of 1,815 people (59.5%) since the 2018 census, and an increase of 4,620 people (1901.2%) since the 2013 census. There were 2,343 males, 2,508 females, and 9 people of other genders in 1,794 dwellings. 2.5% of people identified as LGBTIQ+. There were 957 people (19.7%) aged under 15 years, 675 (13.9%) aged 15 to 29, 2,337 (48.1%) aged 30 to 64, and 894 (18.4%) aged 65 or older.

People could identify as more than one ethnicity. The results were 84.1% European (Pākehā); 8.5% Māori; 2.4% Pasifika; 12.8% Asian; 1.2% Middle Eastern, Latin American and African New Zealanders (MELAA); and 1.9% other, which includes people giving their ethnicity as "New Zealander". English was spoken by 96.2%, Māori by 1.5%, Samoan by 0.4%, and other languages by 13.2%. No language could be spoken by 2.7% (e.g. too young to talk). New Zealand Sign Language was known by 0.3%. The percentage of people born overseas was 22.1, compared with 28.8% nationally.

Religious affiliations were 34.2% Christian, 2.2% Hindu, 0.4% Islam, 0.2% Māori religious beliefs, 0.8% Buddhist, 0.2% New Age, 0.1% Jewish, and 1.6% other religions. People who answered that they had no religion were 55.2%, and 5.2% of people did not answer the census question.

Of those at least 15 years old, 1,152 (29.5%) people had a bachelor's or higher degree, 2,103 (53.8%) had a post-high school certificate or diploma, and 651 (16.7%) people exclusively held high school qualifications. 729 people (18.7%) earned over $100,000 compared to 12.1% nationally. The employment status of those at least 15 was 2,115 (54.1%) full-time, 555 (14.2%) part-time, and 57 (1.5%) unemployed.

Individual statistical areas
Name	Area (km^{2})	Population	Density (per km^{2})	Dwellings	Median age	Median income
Prestons	1.45	2,322	1,601	825	41.0 years	$54,500
Prestons Park	2.62	2,541	970	969	39.5 years	$50,100
New Zealand					38.1 years	$41,500
