= Lake Roto Kohatu =

Recreational lakes reserve

Coordinates: 43°27′47.00002″S 172°34′29.20001″E

Roto Kohatu is a basin in Harewood, Christchurch with two artificial freshwater lakes: Lake Tahi and Lake Rua. Lake Tahi is privately owned by and only available to members of the Canterbury Jet Sports Club. Lake Rua, managed by the Christchurch City Council Park Rangers, is a public access lake for recreational activities such as swimming, sailing, and dragon boating. It is Christchurch's largest accessible lake. Multiple walking trails pass through the reserve, including the 2km Lake Circuit Walk and the 9km Otukaikino Track from the reserve to Darroch Street Reserve in Belfast. It is a popular swimming spot throughout the year for Christchurch residents and travellers.

== History ==
Roto Kohatu was a gravel landfill pit before being transformed into a recreational reserve. Diving and powered watercraft are prohibited in Lake Rua due to the potential for submerged hazards on the lake floor. The water quality of the lakes are continuously tested, and in December 2024 Te Whatu Ora placed a health warning on Lake Rua for the presence of fecal matter in the water that could have a negative impact on the health of those exposed to it. The warning was lifted in January 2025 after further testing.

The reserve's vehicle entrance changed from Sawyers Arms Road to Lakes Way in 2025, making it more accessible for cars and pedestrians alike.
