= Mairehau High School =

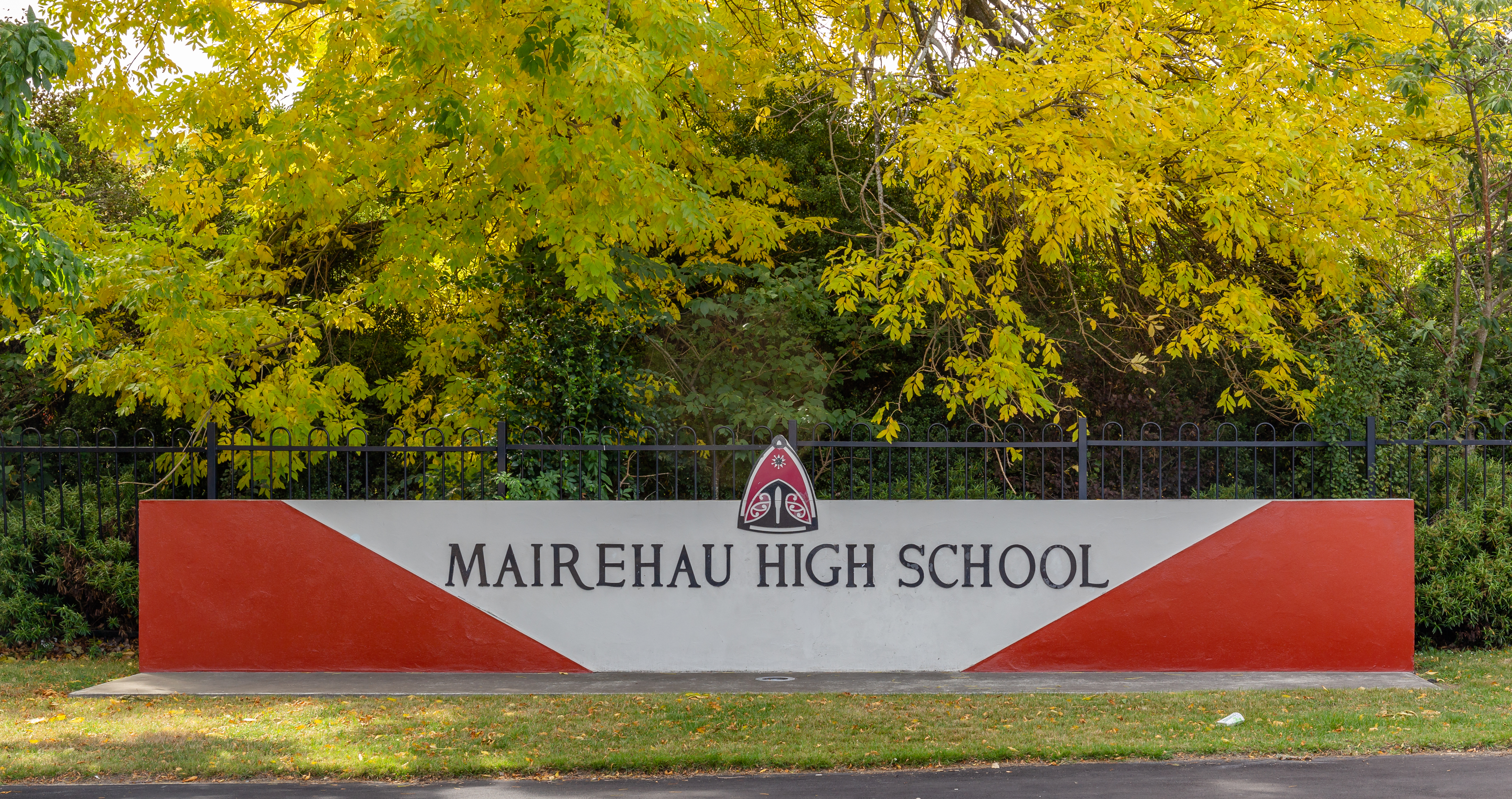
- School sign

Location
- Hills Road; Christchurch; New Zealand; 43.4939°S 172.6486°E

Information
- Type: State co-educational secondary
- Motto: Māori: Mairetia i te matauranga (Be fragrant with wisdom)
- Established: 1 February 1961; 65 years ago
- Ministry of Education Institution no.: 320
- Chairperson: Chris Caselton
- Principal: Harry Romana
- Years offered: 9–13
- Enrolment: 410 (July 2026)
- Color
- Socio-economic decile: 4K
- Website: www.mairehau.school.nz

Mairehau High School is a state co-educational secondary school in Mairehau, Christchurch, New Zealand. The school takes its name from the suburb Mairehau having been adopted in 1916 as a compliment to Mrs Mairehau Hutton whose father, Arthur Gravenor Rhodes, owned considerable property in the area and was a notable benefactor to the district.

The school is located at the northeast end of the suburb, near to Shirley, thus forming a coeducation alternative to Shirley Boys' High School, and Avonside Girls' High School. Mairehau High School opened on 1 February 1961, having been constructed on the advice of the Department of Statistics.

== Enrolment ==
As of July 2026, Mairehau High School has roll of 410 students, of which 104 (25.4%) identify as Māori.

As of 2026, the school has an Equity Index of 510, placing it amongst schools whose students have many socioeconomic barriers to achievement (roughly equivalent to deciles 2 and 3 under the former socio-economic decile system).

== Waka groups ==
Mairehau uses waka groups in place of school houses.

The names and colours of the Mairehau waka groups are:

- Waka Ama – Green
- Waka Katea – Blue
- Tau Ihu – Yellow
- Tau Rapa – Red
