= Marian College, Christchurch =

Marian College

Location
- 2 Lydia Street, Northcote, Christchurch; 43.486°S 172.613°E

Information
- Type: Integrated secondary (year 9–13) single sex, girls
- Motto: "With Mary in Faith"
- Established: 1982; 44 years ago
- Ministry of Education Institution no.: 343
- Enrolment: 430 (July 2026)
- Socio-economic decile: 8P
- Website: www.mariancollege.school.nz

Marian College, Christchurch was founded in 1982 with the merging of two Catholic secondary schools for girls, St Mary's College (Sisters of Mercy, established in Colombo Street in 1893) and McKillop College (named for Mary MacKillop (St Mary of the Cross)) located in Shirley (founded in 1949 by the Sisters of St Joseph of the Sacred Heart). Both schools provided boarding and day facilities. The Catholic Bishop of Christchurch is the proprietor of the college.

== History ==
It was decided to merge these schools into a larger Catholic secondary day school for girls which would be an integrated school under the Private Schools Conditional Integration Act 1975 and to develop it on the McKillop College site in North Parade.

Marian College was officially opened on 25 March 1982, the feast of the Annunciation of the Lord. The first principal was Sister Eleanor Capper RSJ who left in 1996. In the subsequent 30 years, Marian College extended its facilities to include an assembly hall/gymnasium, a music suite, library, technology rooms’ and new classrooms. The oldest building was the administration block, which was built in 1914 by a Doctor Louisson and used as a family residence, until it was sold to the Sisters of St Joseph in 1949.

== 2010–2011 Canterbury earthquakes ==
Because of the effects of the 2010 Canterbury earthquake and the 2011 Christchurch earthquake, the school was relocated for the 2011 school year to St Bede's College, Christchurch. There was also some cooperation with Shirley Boys' High School which was near the school.

As a result of the February earthquake and the June 2011 Christchurch earthquake significant liquefaction occurred on the College site resulting in most buildings suffering differential settlement in many areas of up to 215mm. It was therefore decided to relocate the school to the site of Catholic Cathedral College (where there was sufficient surplus capacity to accommodate the school) at 122 Barbadoes Street at the beginning of the 2012 school year. Initially, the College was expected to be accommodated for a period of two to four years. On 15 March 2019, Marian College announced the site for a new location on Lydia Street in Northcote. The school opened on the new site on 9 February 2024.

== Enrolment ==
As of July 2026, Marian College has a roll of 430 students, of which 61 (14.2%) identify as Māori.

As of 2026, the school has an Equity Index of 426, placing it amongst schools whose students have few socioeconomic barriers to achievement (roughly equivalent to deciles 8 and 9 under the former socio-economic decile system).

== Sources ==
- Mary Declan Burke RSM, Mercy through the years : the centennial history of the Sisters of Mercy, Christchurch Diocese, 1878–1978, Sisters of Mercy Trust Board, Christchurch, 1978.
- St. Mary's Schools Christchurch, 1894–1994: A history published for the centennial jubilee, September 1994, St Mary's School, Christchurch, 1994.
- A Century in pictures : the Sisters of St Joseph of the Sacred Heart in New Zealand, 1883–1983, Catholic Publications Centre for the Sisters of St Joseph of the Sacred Heart, Auckland, 1983.
- Anne Marie Power R.S.J., Sisters of St Joseph of the Sacred Heart : New Zealand story, 1883–1997, The Sisters, Auckland, 1997.
- Diane Strevens, MacKillop Women: The Sisters of St Joseph of the Sacred Heart Aotearoa New Zealand 1883–2006, David Ling, Auckland, 2008.
- Michael O'Meeghan S.M., Held firm by faith : a history of the Catholic Diocese of Christchurch, 1840–1987, Catholic Diocese of Christchurch, Christchurch, 1988.
- Michael King, God's farthest outpost : a history of Catholics in New Zealand, Viking, Auckland 1997. ISBN 978-0-14-026719-8
