= Mairehau =

Suburb of Christchurch, New Zealand

- Suburb
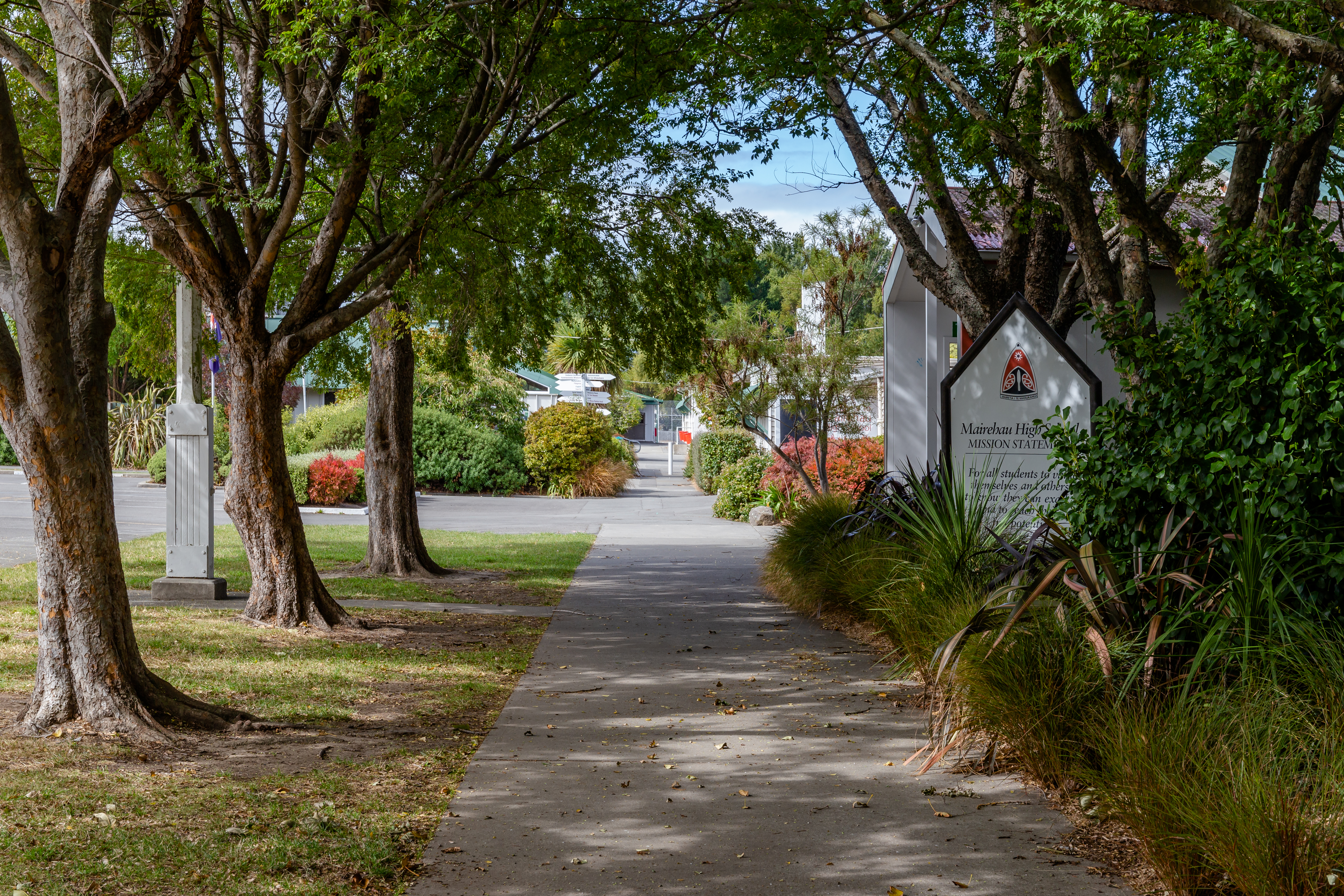
- Mairehau High School
- Interactive map of Mairehau
- Coordinates: 43.498884°S 172.640324°E
- Country: New Zealand
- City: Christchurch
- Local authority: Christchurch City Council
- Electoral ward: Innes; Papanui
- Community board: Waipapa Papanui-Innes-Central

Area
  - Land: 348 ha (860 acres)

Population (June 2025)
  - Total: 7,100
  - Density: 2,000/km^{2} (5,300/sq mi)

Redwood	Marshland	Prestons
Northcote	Mairehau	Shirley
St Albans	Edgeware	Richmond

Mairehau (Māori pronunciation: [maiɾɛːhau]) is a suburb of Christchurch, New Zealand. It is located 4 kilometres (2.5 miles) north of the city centre, close to the edge of the urbanised central city area. Much new development is being carried out on the northern edge of Mairehau.

The suburb was named after Rose Mairehau (Maire) Hutton (née Rhodes), daughter of Arthur Rhodes, who in turn was Mayor of Christchurch in 1901–1902 and a major local property owner.

== Demographics ==
Mairehau, comprising the statistical areas of Mairehau North and Mairehau South, covers 3.48 km^{2} (1.34 sq mi). It had an estimated population of 7,100 as of June 2025, with a population density of 2,040 people per km^{2}.

Historical population
Year	Pop.	±% p.a.
2006	5,781	—
2013	6,504	+1.70%
2018	6,867	+1.09%
2023	6,792	−0.22%
The 2006 population is for a larger area of 3.61 km^{2}. Source:

Mairehau had a population of 6,792 in the 2023 New Zealand census, a decrease of 75 people (−1.1%) since the 2018 census, and an increase of 288 people (4.4%) since the 2013 census. There were 3,285 males, 3,483 females, and 24 people of other genders in 2,595 dwellings. 4.1% of people identified as LGBTIQ+. The median age was 37.7 years (compared with 38.1 years nationally). There were 1,248 people (18.4%) aged under 15 years, 1,359 (20.0%) aged 15 to 29, 3,015 (44.4%) aged 30 to 64, and 1,167 (17.2%) aged 65 or older.

People could identify as more than one ethnicity. The results were 84.5% European (Pākehā); 12.6% Māori; 4.5% Pasifika; 9.3% Asian; 1.3% Middle Eastern, Latin American and African New Zealanders (MELAA); and 1.9% other, which includes people giving their ethnicity as "New Zealander". English was spoken by 96.3%, Māori by 2.3%, Samoan by 1.5%, and other languages by 10.0%. No language could be spoken by 2.6% (e.g. too young to talk). New Zealand Sign Language was known by 0.7%. The percentage of people born overseas was 20.2, compared with 28.8% nationally.

Religious affiliations were 33.3% Christian, 0.9% Hindu, 1.1% Islam, 0.5% Māori religious beliefs, 0.5% Buddhist, 0.4% New Age, 0.1% Jewish, and 1.3% other religions. People who answered that they had no religion were 56.1%, and 5.9% of people did not answer the census question.

Of those at least 15 years old, 1,395 (25.2%) people had a bachelor's or higher degree, 2,892 (52.2%) had a post-high school certificate or diploma, and 1,260 (22.7%) people exclusively held high school qualifications. The median income was $41,600, compared with $41,500 nationally. 603 people (10.9%) earned over $100,000 compared to 12.1% nationally. The employment status of those at least 15 was 2,853 (51.5%) full-time, 741 (13.4%) part-time, and 123 (2.2%) unemployed.

Individual statistical areas
Name	Area (km^{2})	Population	Density (per km^{2})	Dwellings	Median age	Median income
Mairehau North	2.09	3,033	1,451	1,194	44.6 years	$34,600
Mairehau South	1.39	3,759	2,704	1,401	34.1 years	$48,400
New Zealand					38.1 years	$41,500

== Education ==
Mairehau High School is a secondary school for years 9 to 13. It has a roll of 410. The school opened in 1961.

Mairehau School is a full primary school catering for years 1 to 8. It has a roll of 379. The school opened in 1953. Birch Grove School closed and merged with Mairehau School in 2004. Glenmoor School closed in 2014.

St Francis of Assisi Catholic School is a state-integrated full primary school catering for years 1 to 8. It has a roll of 466. The school opened in 2016 as the result of a merger between Our Lady of Fatima School and St Paul's School.

All these schools are coeducational. Rolls are as of July 2026.
