= Bottle Lake, New Zealand =

Rural area in Christchurch, New Zealand

Bottle Lake
- Suburb
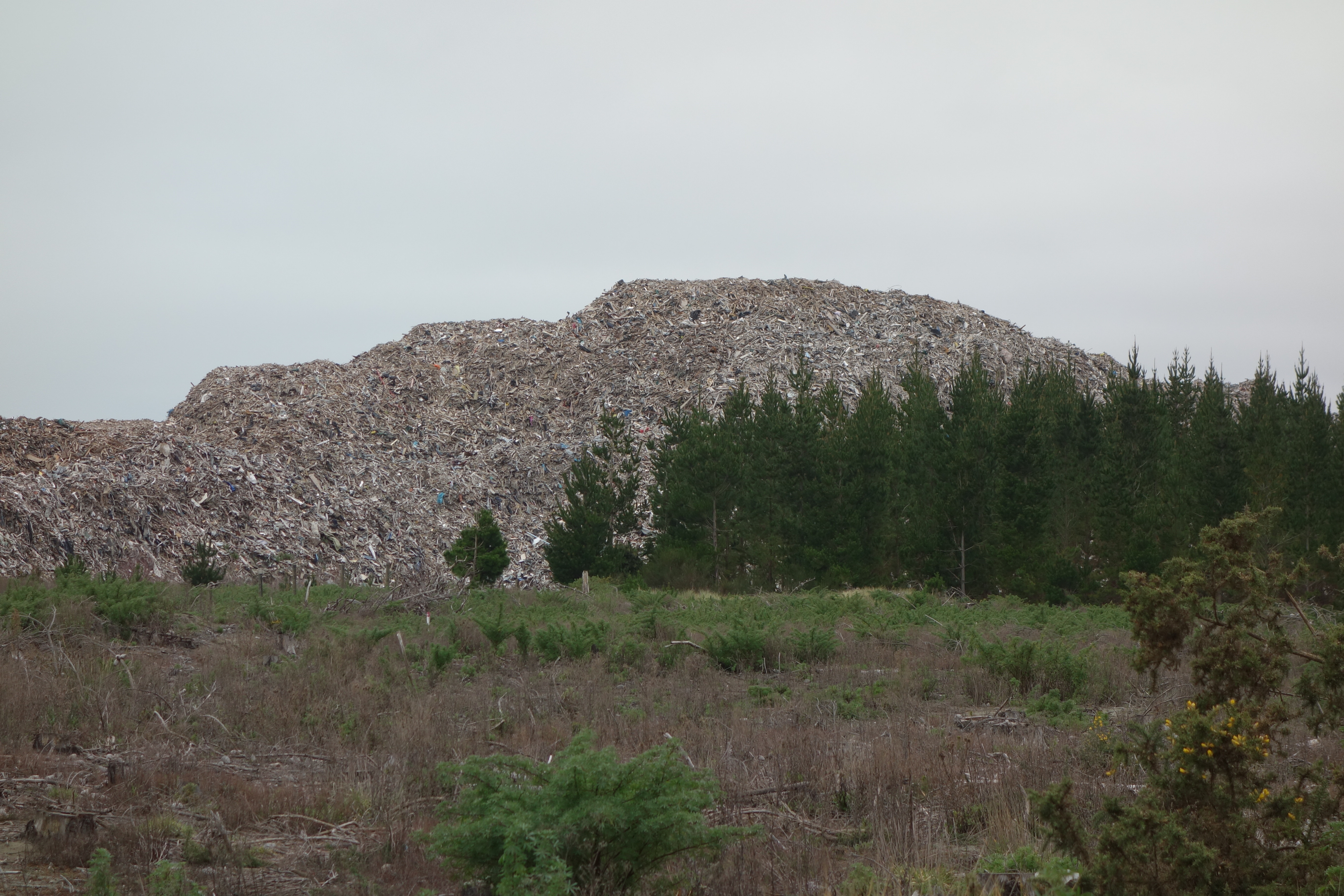
- Demolition material from the 2011 Christchurch earthquake piled up in Bottle Lake Forest
- Interactive map of Bottle Lake
- Coordinates: 43.455°S 172.666°E
- Country: New Zealand
- City: Christchurch
- Local authority: Christchurch City Council
- Electoral ward: Coastal
- Community board: Waitai Coastal-Burwood-Linwood

Area
  - Land: 1,453 ha (3,590 acres)

Population (2023 census)
  - Total: 105
  - Density: 7.23/km^{2} (18.7/sq mi)

Belfast	Kainga	Spencerville
Northwood	Bottle Lake	(Pegasus Bay)
Marshland	Prestons	Parklands

Bottle Lake is an area in the north-east of Christchurch with a low number of residents. Most of the area is covered by Bottle Lake Forest, which has since the mid-1970s become a popular recreation area.

The area was known as Waitikiri to Māori and the swamplands around a lake was a traditional mahinga kai (food gathering place). Bottle Lake was first granted for grazing in 1853. The area was bought as a sheep run by John McLean in 1860. He sold the land after only two years to Edward Reece, who named his homestead Waitikiri after the Māori name for the area. Reece commissioned John Gibb to paint Bottle Lake about 20 years after he purchased the land. Reece died in 1885, and the painting was gifted to the Canterbury Society of Arts in 1902 by his son, William Reece. The oil painting is today owned by the Christchurch Art Gallery.

Most of the area was purchased in 1878 by Christchurch City Council for waste disposal, but grazing continued into the next century. The pine plantation was begun in 1912, and the land was drained. By the late 1930s, the lake had dried up. The name of the lake was used for other purposes. The hospital board looked for a remote area where an infectious diseases hospital could be set up, and they established the Bottle Lake Hospital. This has since been renamed Burwood Hospital. The road leading to the hospital was originally called Bottle Lake Road and has since been changed to Burwood Road. The suburb that formed around the hospital took its later name—Burwood.

The production forest was out of bounds, and the area was virtually unknown to Christchurch people. This changed in 1975, when the forest was given park status. It has since developed into a recreation area, with mountain biking, horse riding, and walking all very popular. There is some housing on the fringes of Bottle Lake Forest, and Waitikiri Drive is a reminder of the area's original name.

The former landfill site within Bottle Lake was reopened after the February 2011 Christchurch earthquake to take an estimated 4.5 million tonnes of demolition material.

== Demographics ==
Bottle Lake covers 14.53 km^{2} (5.61 sq mi). It is part of the larger Styx statistical area.

Historical population
Year	Pop.	±% p.a.
2006	213	—
2013	162	−3.83%
2018	129	−4.45%
2023	105	−4.03%
The 2006 population is for a larger area of 18.09 km^{2}. Source:

Bottle Lake had a population of 105 in the 2023 New Zealand census, a decrease of 24 people (−18.6%) since the 2018 census, and a decrease of 57 people (−35.2%) since the 2013 census. There were 51 males and 54 females in 42 dwellings. 2.9% of people identified as LGBTIQ+. The median age was 53.7 years (compared with 38.1 years nationally). There were 12 people (11.4%) aged under 15 years, 18 (17.1%) aged 15 to 29, 48 (45.7%) aged 30 to 64, and 27 (25.7%) aged 65 or older.

People could identify as more than one ethnicity. The results were 94.3% European (Pākehā); 8.6% Māori; 2.9% Asian; 2.9% Middle Eastern, Latin American and African New Zealanders (MELAA); and 5.7% other, which includes people giving their ethnicity as "New Zealander". English was spoken by 97.1%, and other languages by 5.7%. New Zealand Sign Language was known by 2.9%. The percentage of people born overseas was 11.4, compared with 28.8% nationally.

Religious affiliations were 34.3% Christian, 2.9% Islam, and 2.9% New Age. People who answered that they had no religion were 51.4%, and 8.6% of people did not answer the census question.

Of those at least 15 years old, 9 (9.7%) people had a bachelor's or higher degree, 54 (58.1%) had a post-high school certificate or diploma, and 27 (29.0%) people exclusively held high school qualifications. The median income was $49,200, compared with $41,500 nationally. 15 people (16.1%) earned over $100,000 compared to 12.1% nationally. The employment status of those at least 15 was 42 (45.2%) full-time, 15 (16.1%) part-time, and 3 (3.2%) unemployed.

=== Styx statistical area ===
Styx statistical area, which also includes Kainga, covers 32.09 km^{2} (12.39 sq mi) It had an estimated population of 1,090 as of June 2025, with a population density of 34.0 people per km^{2}.

Historical population
Year	Pop.	±% p.a.
2006	939	—
2013	1,134	+2.73%
2018	1,086	−0.86%
2023	1,065	−0.39%
The 2006 population is for a larger area of 32.72 km^{2}. Source:

Styx had a population of 1,065 in the 2023 New Zealand census, a decrease of 21 people (−1.9%) since the 2018 census, and a decrease of 69 people (−6.1%) since the 2013 census. There were 555 males, 507 females, and 3 people of other genders in 393 dwellings. 3.1% of people identified as LGBTIQ+. The median age was 46.7 years (compared with 38.1 years nationally). There were 147 people (13.8%) aged under 15 years, 165 (15.5%) aged 15 to 29, 561 (52.7%) aged 30 to 64, and 192 (18.0%) aged 65 or older.

People could identify as more than one ethnicity. The results were 91.3% European (Pākehā); 10.7% Māori; 1.1% Pasifika; 4.8% Asian; 0.6% Middle Eastern, Latin American and African New Zealanders (MELAA); and 3.7% other, which includes people giving their ethnicity as "New Zealander". English was spoken by 97.5%, Māori by 1.4%, Samoan by 0.3%, and other languages by 6.5%. No language could be spoken by 2.3% (e.g. too young to talk). New Zealand Sign Language was known by 0.3%. The percentage of people born overseas was 14.9, compared with 28.8% nationally.

Religious affiliations were 27.6% Christian, 0.3% Hindu, 0.6% Islam, 0.3% Māori religious beliefs, 0.6% Buddhist, 0.6% New Age, and 1.4% other religions. People who answered that they had no religion were 60.6%, and 8.5% of people did not answer the census question.

Of those at least 15 years old, 129 (14.1%) people had a bachelor's or higher degree, 528 (57.5%) had a post-high school certificate or diploma, and 258 (28.1%) people exclusively held high school qualifications. The median income was $41,800, compared with $41,500 nationally. 72 people (7.8%) earned over $100,000 compared to 12.1% nationally. The employment status of those at least 15 was 480 (52.3%) full-time, 135 (14.7%) part-time, and 15 (1.6%) unemployed.
