= Christchurch Northern Line Cycleway =

Cycleway in Christchurch, New Zealand

Northern Line Cycleway
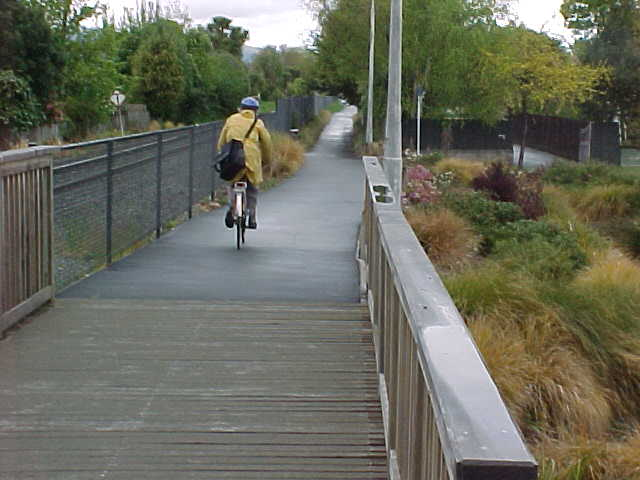
- Pathway south of Wairakei Road in 2002
- Length: 6 km (3.7 mi)
- Location: Christchurch, New Zealand
- Trailheads: Kilmarnock Street (south) / Belfast (north)
- Use: Walking; Cycling
- Elevation gain/loss: nil
- Difficulty: Easy
- Season: Year round

The Christchurch Northern Line Cycleway (previously informally known as the Railway Cycleway) is a 7.5 kilometres (4.7 mi) long shared pedestrian and cycle path following the Main North railway in Christchurch. The route currently extends from Kilmarnock Street (Riccarton) in the south, through Fendalton and Papanui to Northwood and Belfast in the north.

== Route ==
=== Existing path ===
The path follows the route of the Main North Line, which is operational. It is essentially flat, varying in width from 1.8 metres (5 ft 11 in) wide to 3.5 metres (11 ft) wide depending on the available corridor. A description of the route can be found in a Christchurch City Council publication.

Despite its commonly used name, the pathway is a shared pedestrian/cycle facility. It connects a number of schools (e.g. Papanui High School, Waimairi School, Christchurch Girls' High School) and local shopping centres (Papanui, Strowan) and provides an off-road commuter connection from the northern suburbs to Riccarton and the central city.

=== Intersection control ===
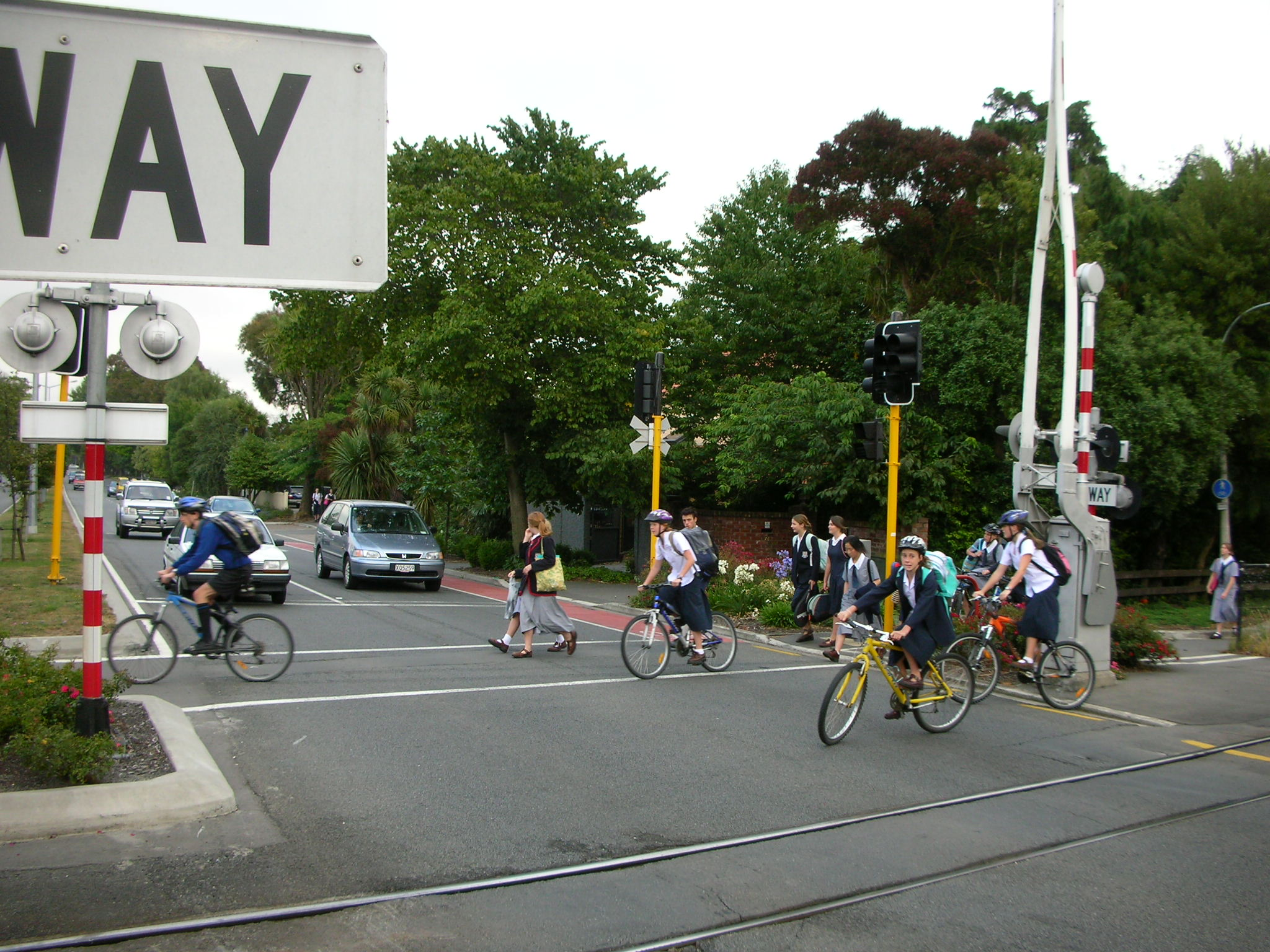
Pathway users crossing Fendalton Road with the help of traffic signals in 2007

The core section of the pathway (from Harewood Road to Matai Street) was constructed in the late 1990s / early 2000s. Of the five road crossings, three (Fendalton Road, Wairakei Road and Glandovey Road) were considered to require traffic signal control. One of the crossing points (Blighs Road) has since been retrofitted with traffic signals. The 2010 extension to Tuckers Road also included the creation of a signalised crossing at Northcote Road.

The signalised crossings feature bicycle detectors on the pathway well in advance of the intersections, so that riders receive a green signal as they arrive at the crossings.

Beginning in 2024, KiwiRail began upgrading the crossings at Harewood, Langdons and Sawyers Arms Roads to introduce automatic safety gates where paths cross the rail tracks.

=== Path extensions ===
In 2024 a northern extension to the cycleway opened, continuing from Tuckers Road in Redwood north to connect with Main North Road south of Northwood.

South, there are plans in the next decade to continue the pathway along the railway line through Riccarton across Riccarton Road and on to Blenheim Road and the Christchurch railway station. Longer-term, the current city transport strategic plan envisages linking this corridor with others along the railway lines to the west and southeast.
