= Shirley, New Zealand =

Suburb of Christchurch, New Zealand

Shirley
- Suburb
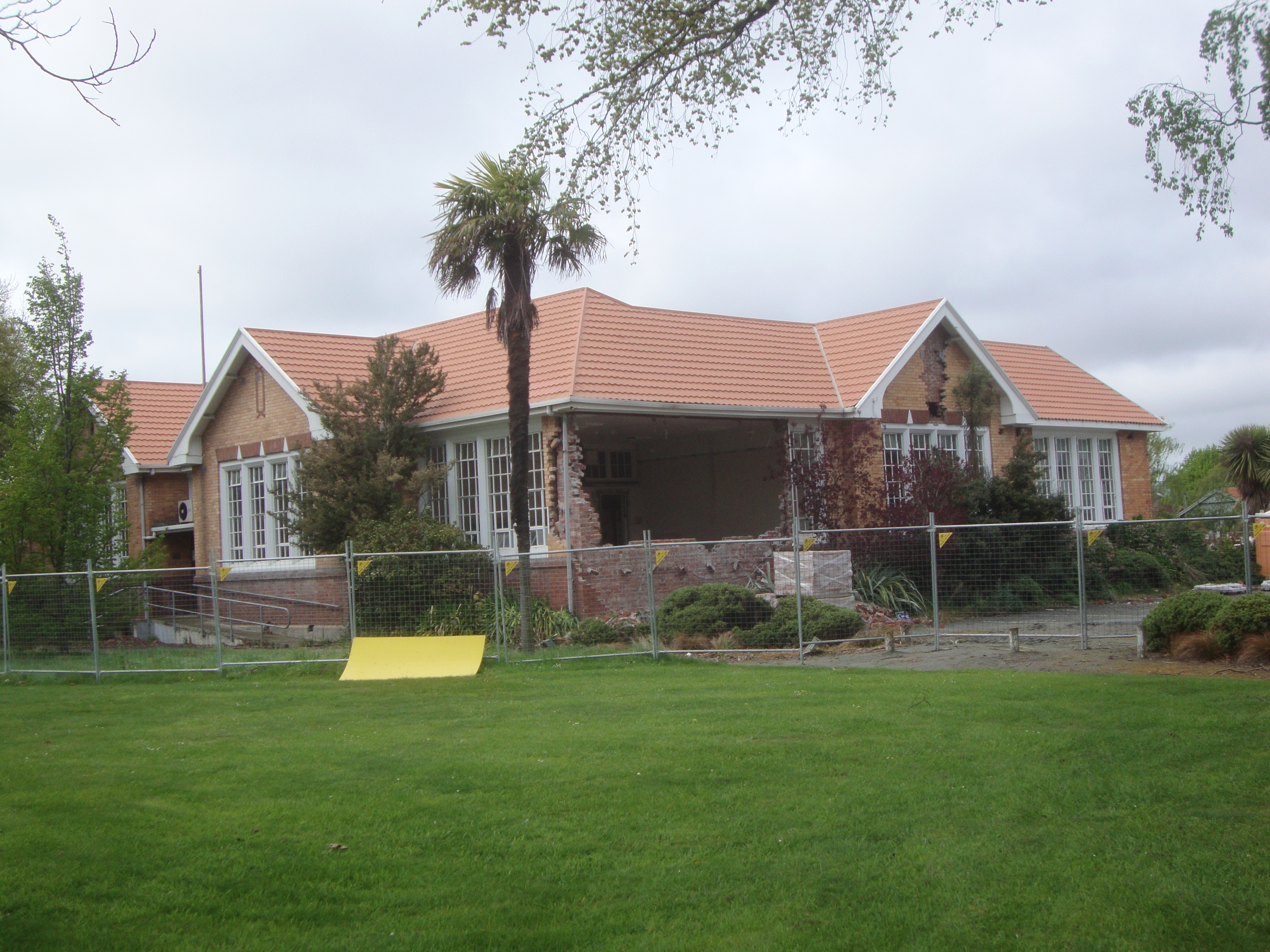
- The Shirley Community Centre displaying significant earthquake damage
- Interactive map of Shirley
- Coordinates: 43.503963°S 172.660879°E
- Country: New Zealand
- City: Christchurch
- Local authority: Christchurch City Council
- Electoral ward: Innes; Burwood
- Community board: Waitai Coastal-Burwood-Linwood; Waipapa Papanui-Innes-Central

Area
  - Land: 333 ha (820 acres)

Population (June 2025)
  - Total: 7,140
  - Density: 2,140/km^{2} (5,550/sq mi)

Marshland		Prestons
Mairehau	Shirley	Burwood
Edgeware	Dallington; Richmond	(Residential red zone)

Shirley, sometimes referred to as Windsor, is a suburb of Christchurch, New Zealand, about 5 kilometres (3.1 mi) north-east of the city centre. The area was used for farming from the 1850s, and subdivision started in the early 20th century, with most of the houses being built between 1950 and 1980.

== History ==
The suburb spreads across wholly flat land which before the arrival of the first European colonists in the 1850s consisted of streams running into marshland between weathered and grassy sand dunes. Sheep and dairy cattle began to be grazed on the land within a few years of the colonists' arrival, the area being part of the Sandhills station. Land began to be bought by families of small farmers from 1863 onwards, and during the rest of the 19th century the future suburb was a district of market gardens, dairy farms and small grazing farms divided by hedgerows. A farmhouse and stables could be found along the roads every few hundred metres. As more and more land was drained it was often highly productive. One large estate was established by the very wealthy Rhodes family who chose not to live on the land but instead resided in a very large mansion in Merivale. Their estate in the district was run by managers and overseers. The district's settlers were mostly English and Scottish, but some Irish families also settled, as well as – in the 1870s – a significant group of Poles from eastern Germany. A small village of shops and one or two churches had begun to grow up by that time along what would later become known as Shirley Road.

Most of the housing in Shirley was built between 1950 and 1980. A large block of state housing, known as the Emmett Block, developed on the western side of the suburb during the immediate postwar years. On the eastern side the housing was built mostly by private developers, among others Paramount Homes. The standard house built by developers was a one-storey bungalow of three or four bedrooms under a low roof in streets that sometimes followed the course of old streams, meandered in various artificial crescents, or else ended in cul-de-sacs. The socio-economic level of the suburb as a whole has always been very near the average for the suburbs of Christchurch. The poorest streets are in the Emmett Block.

== Name ==
Susannah Buxton (née Shirley) was married to John Buxton (1806–1886). On her deathbed in 1868, she asked her son, Joseph Shirley Buxton (1833–1898), to gift land to the Methodists to build a church. Her wish was carried out and the Shirley Methodist Church was named after her. The suburb eventually became known as Shirley after the church.

Subdivision started in the early 20th century, at which time the area was known as North Richmond. The name then changed to Windsor, until it was discussed at a meeting at the Windsor Wesleyan School that land agents indicated land sold better if the locality was called Shirley instead of Windsor. Windsor thus went out of fashion as the name of the suburb, but it lives on in names like Windsor Golf Club, Windsor Service Station, Windsor House, and Windsor School.

== Demographics ==
Shirley, comprising the statistical areas of Shirley West and Shirley East, covers 3.33 km^{2} (1.29 sq mi). It had an estimated population of 7,140 as of June 2025, with a population density of 2,144 people per km^{2}.

Historical population
Year	Pop.	±% p.a.
2006	6,579	—
2013	6,588	+0.02%
2018	6,855	+0.80%
2023	6,876	+0.06%

Shirley had a population of 6,876 in the 2023 New Zealand census, an increase of 21 people (0.3%) since the 2018 census, and an increase of 288 people (4.4%) since the 2013 census. There were 3,348 males, 3,498 females, and 33 people of other genders in 2,565 dwellings. 4.1% of people identified as LGBTIQ+. The median age was 39.0 years (compared with 38.1 years nationally). There were 1,185 people (17.2%) aged under 15 years, 1,317 (19.2%) aged 15 to 29, 3,066 (44.6%) aged 30 to 64, and 1,311 (19.1%) aged 65 or older.

People could identify as more than one ethnicity. The results were 78.3% European (Pākehā); 15.2% Māori; 6.1% Pasifika; 12.3% Asian; 2.2% Middle Eastern, Latin American and African New Zealanders (MELAA); and 2.0% other, which includes people giving their ethnicity as "New Zealander". English was spoken by 96.1%, Māori by 2.7%, Samoan by 2.0%, and other languages by 11.9%. No language could be spoken by 1.9% (e.g. too young to talk). New Zealand Sign Language was known by 0.9%. The percentage of people born overseas was 21.6, compared with 28.8% nationally.

Religious affiliations were 33.0% Christian, 1.6% Hindu, 1.0% Islam, 0.7% Māori religious beliefs, 0.7% Buddhist, 0.5% New Age, and 2.3% other religions. People who answered that they had no religion were 53.1%, and 7.4% of people did not answer the census question.

Of those at least 15 years old, 981 (17.2%) people had a bachelor's or higher degree, 3,036 (53.3%) had a post-high school certificate or diploma, and 1,677 (29.5%) people exclusively held high school qualifications. The median income was $34,800, compared with $41,500 nationally. 360 people (6.3%) earned over $100,000 compared to 12.1% nationally. The employment status of those at least 15 was 2,607 (45.8%) full-time, 762 (13.4%) part-time, and 168 (3.0%) unemployed.

Individual statistical areas
Name	Area (km^{2})	Population	Density (per km^{2})	Dwellings	Median age	Median income
Shirley West	1.63	4,281	2,626	1,551	35.2 years	$35,300
Shirley East	1.70	2,598	1,528	1,014	48.3 years	$34,000
New Zealand					38.1 years	$41,500

== Services ==
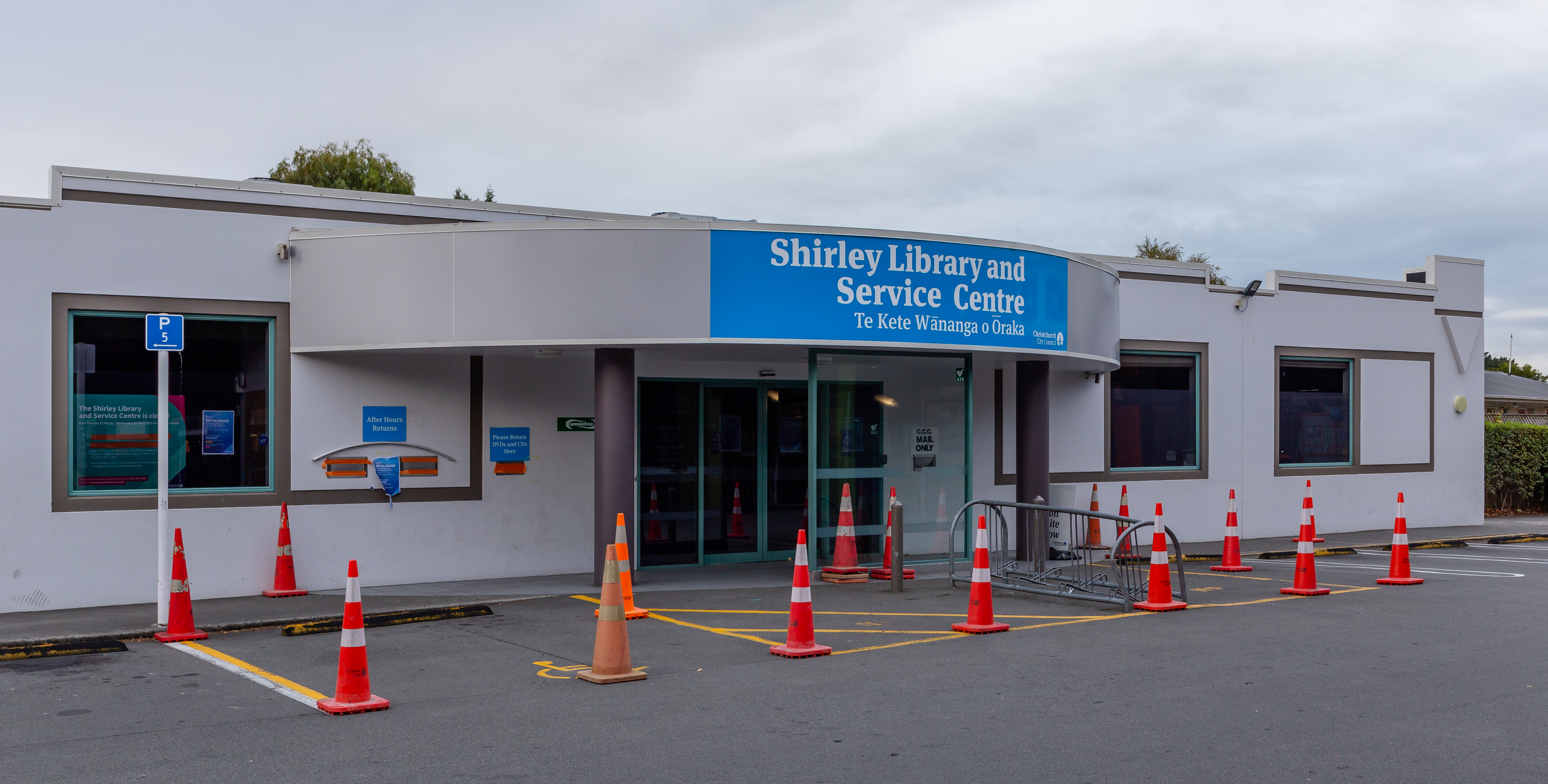
Shirley Library

The suburb now includes one of the largest shopping malls in Christchurch, called The Palms Shopping Centre, together with the Shirley Golf Course and a Bunnings at Homebase retail centre.

The building of the Shirley Community Centre, which was the original building of Shirley Primary School, was listed as a Category II heritage structure with Heritage New Zealand and was badly damaged in the February 2011 Christchurch earthquake. It has since been demolished.

=== Education ===
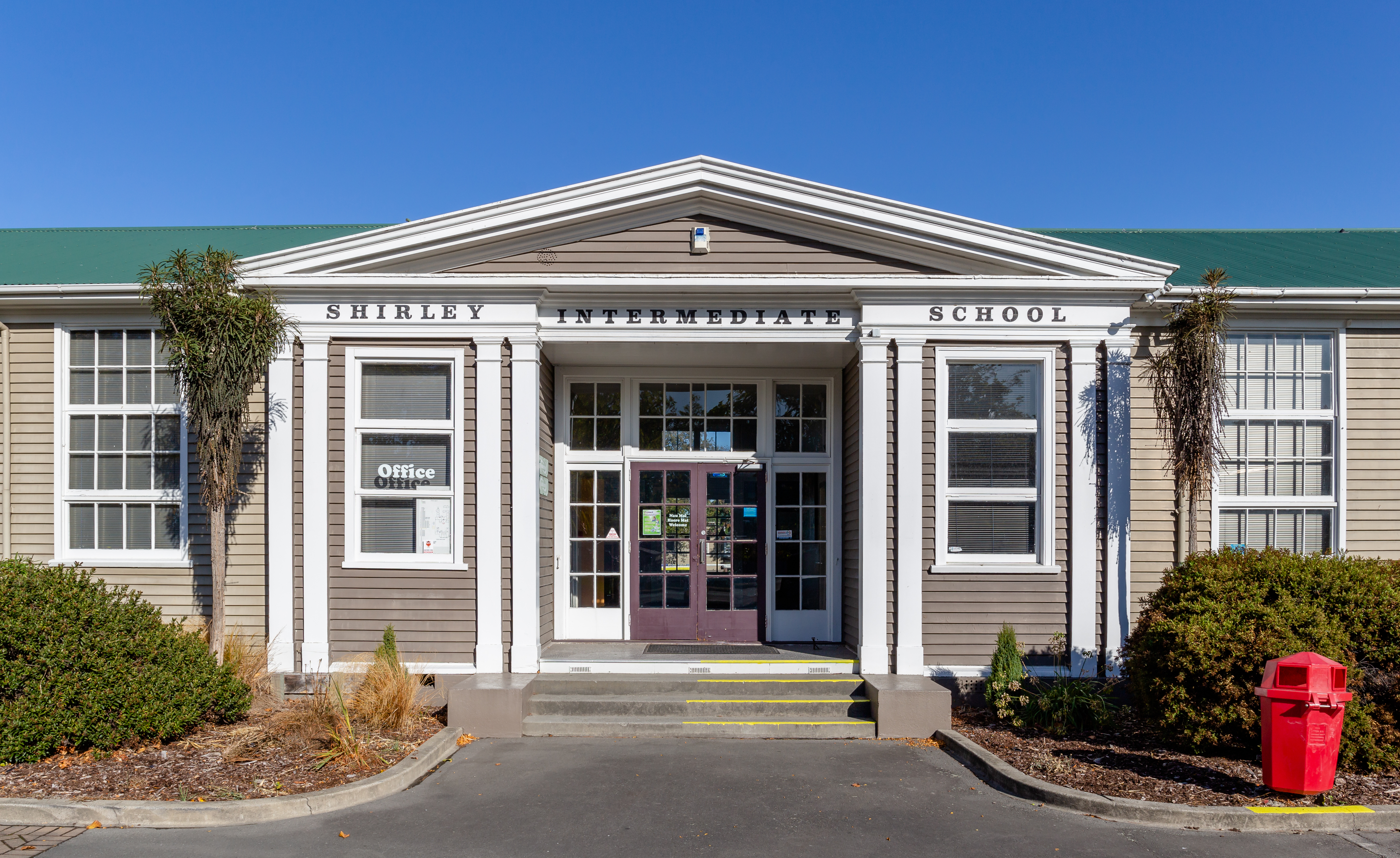
Shirley Intermediate

Shirley Intermediate School is a school for years 7 to 8 with a roll of 192 students. It opened in 1934.

Shirley Primary School covers years 1 to 6 and has a roll of 364 students. It opened in 1916.

Kingslea School is a special school and has a roll of 123 students.

Rolls are as of July 2026.

Shirley Boys' High School opened in September 1957. The site suffered from the 2011 Christchurch earthquakes, and the school moved to North New Brighton in 2019.

Marian College is a Catholic girls' secondary school which was in Shirley but moved to share space with Catholic Cathedral College in the central city after 2011 earthquake damage, and moved to a new site in Northcote in 2023.

Quinns Road School opened on 6 July 1955 and was renamed to Hammersley Park School in 1983. It was closed in 2012 after suffering earthquake damage, since its roll had fallen from more than 200 in the early 1990s to 49.
