= Casebrook =

Suburb of Christchurch, New Zealand

- Suburb
- Interactive map of Casebrook
- Coordinates: 43.475°S 172.607°E
- Country: New Zealand
- City: Christchurch
- Local authority: Christchurch City Council
- Electoral ward: Harewood; Papanui
- Community board: Waimāero Fendalton-Waimairi-Harewood; Waipapa Papanui-Innes-Central

Area
  - Land: 329 ha (810 acres)

Population (June 2025)
  - Total: 6,720
  - Density: 2,040/km^{2} (5,290/sq mi)

	Northwood
Harewood	Casebrook	Redwood
Bishopdale	Papanui	Northcote

Casebrook is a suburb on the northern side of Christchurch city.

The land was farmed by Walter Case (1881?–1961). When Casebrook Intermediate was built in 1966, it combined his name with the presence of a stream near the school. The suburb developed subsequently and took its name from the school. There is a Walter Case Drive in the suburb. Casebrook contains one intermediate school and home to a local soccer team, the Nomads United.

== Demographics ==
Casebrook, comprising the statistical areas of Casebrook and Regents Park, covers 3.29 km^{2} (1.27 sq mi). It had an estimated population of 6,720 as of June 2025, with a population density of 2,043 people per km^{2}.

Historical population
Year	Pop.	±% p.a.
2006	4,893	—
2013	4,974	+0.23%
2018	5,262	+1.13%
2023	6,084	+2.95%

Casebrook had a population of 6,084 in the 2023 New Zealand census, an increase of 822 people (15.6%) since the 2018 census, and an increase of 1,110 people (22.3%) since the 2013 census. There were 2,964 males, 3,093 females, and 24 people of other genders in 2,391 dwellings. 3.2% of people identified as LGBTIQ+. The median age was 43.7 years (compared with 38.1 years nationally). There were 942 people (15.5%) aged under 15 years, 1,056 (17.4%) aged 15 to 29, 2,682 (44.1%) aged 30 to 64, and 1,401 (23.0%) aged 65 or older.

People could identify as more than one ethnicity. The results were 84.0% European (Pākehā); 8.9% Māori; 3.2% Pasifika; 11.5% Asian; 1.2% Middle Eastern, Latin American and African New Zealanders (MELAA); and 2.7% other, which includes people giving their ethnicity as "New Zealander". English was spoken by 96.8%, Māori by 1.3%, Samoan by 0.7%, and other languages by 12.0%. No language could be spoken by 1.9% (e.g. too young to talk). New Zealand Sign Language was known by 0.5%. The percentage of people born overseas was 20.6, compared with 28.8% nationally.

Religious affiliations were 40.6% Christian, 1.2% Hindu, 0.8% Islam, 0.2% Māori religious beliefs, 0.6% Buddhist, 0.2% New Age, and 1.5% other religions. People who answered that they had no religion were 48.9%, and 6.1% of people did not answer the census question.

Of those at least 15 years old, 1,164 (22.6%) people had a bachelor's or higher degree, 2,916 (56.7%) had a post-high school certificate or diploma, and 1,056 (20.5%) people exclusively held high school qualifications. The median income was $41,900, compared with $41,500 nationally. 612 people (11.9%) earned over $100,000 compared to 12.1% nationally. The employment status of those at least 15 was 2,499 (48.6%) full-time, 717 (13.9%) part-time, and 99 (1.9%) unemployed.

Individual statistical areas
Name	Area (km^{2})	Population	Density (per km^{2})	Dwellings	Median age	Median income
Casebrook	1.83	4,293	2,346	1,641	38.3 years	$44,500
Regents Park	1.46	1,791	1,227	750	57.1 years	$36,500
New Zealand					38.1 years	$41,500

== Education ==
Casebrook Intermediate is an intermediate school catering for years 7 to 8. It had a roll of 440 as of March 2026. The school opened in 1966.

== Sport ==
=== Teams ===
Nomads United
