= Harewood, New Zealand =

Suburb of Christchurch, New Zealand

Harewood
- Suburb
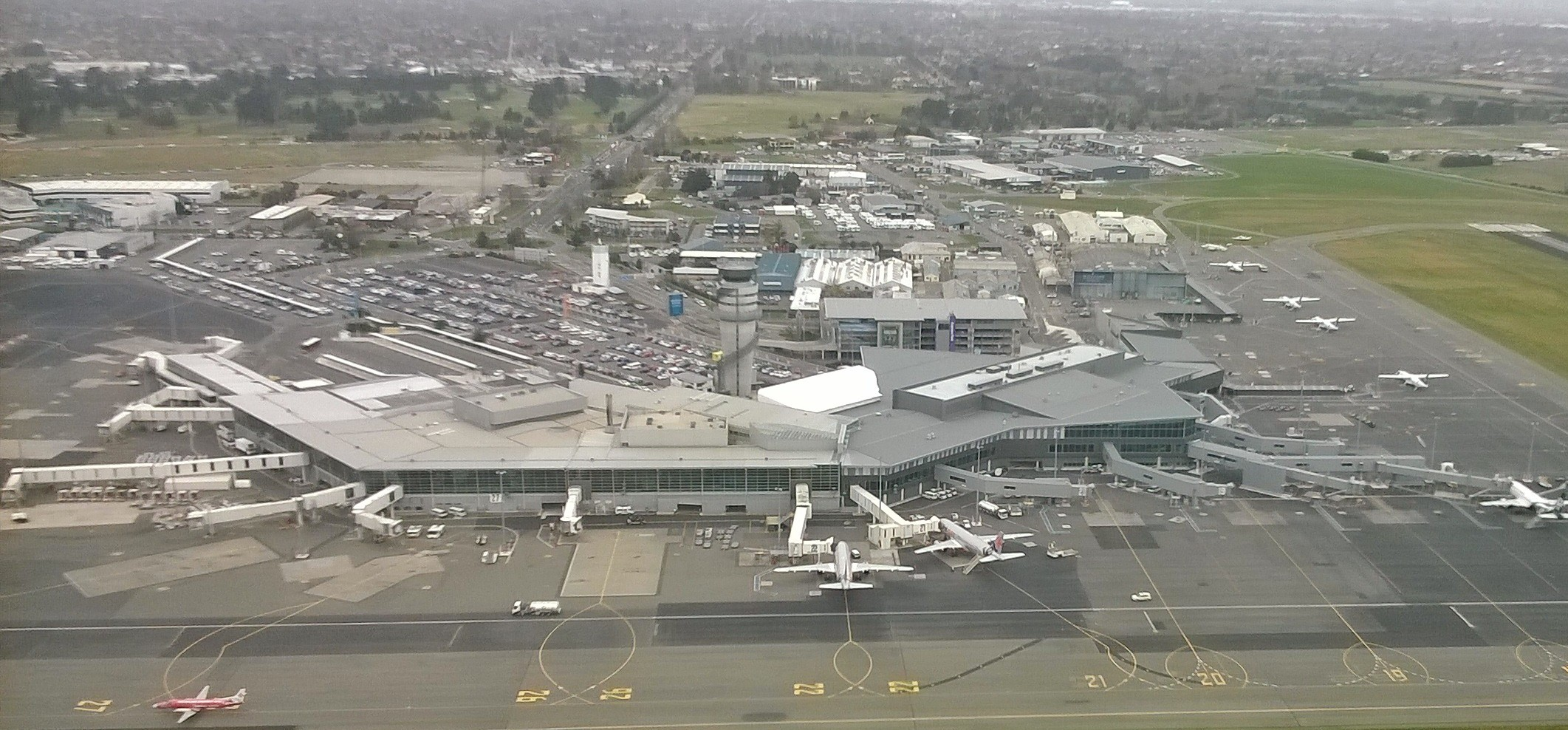
- Christchurch Airport, located within Harewood, with other parts of Harewood visible in the background
- Interactive map of Harewood
- Coordinates: 43.47979°S 172.56241°E
- Country: New Zealand
- City: Christchurch
- Local authority: Christchurch City Council
- Electoral ward: Harewood
- Community board: Waimāero Fendalton-Waimairi-Harewood

Area
  - Land: 379 ha (940 acres)

Population (June 2025)
  - Total: 1,390
  - Density: 367/km^{2} (950/sq mi)

McLeans Island		Northwood
Christchurch Airport	Harewood	Casebrook
Russley	Burnside	Bishopdale

Harewood (/hɛrwʊd/) is a northwestern suburb of Christchurch, New Zealand. The suburb is split by State Highway 1, with the bulk of Harewood's residential areas to the east of the highway and its industrial areas to the west. The suburb is a major transport hub and it encompasses the International Antarctic Centre.

== Demographics ==
Harewood statistical area, which does not include Christchurch Airport or the industrial area north of SH1, covers 3.79 km^{2} (1.46 sq mi). It had an estimated population of 1,390 as of June 2025, with a population density of 367 people per km^{2}.

Historical population
Year	Pop.	±% p.a.
2006	1,428	—
2013	1,401	−0.27%
2018	1,386	−0.22%
2023	1,323	−0.93%

Harewood had a population of 1,323 in the 2023 New Zealand census, a decrease of 63 people (−4.5%) since the 2018 census, and a decrease of 78 people (−5.6%) since the 2013 census. There were 675 males and 648 females in 507 dwellings. 1.6% of people identified as LGBTIQ+. The median age was 50.3 years (compared with 38.1 years nationally). There were 195 people (14.7%) aged under 15 years, 213 (16.1%) aged 15 to 29, 576 (43.5%) aged 30 to 64, and 339 (25.6%) aged 65 or older.

People could identify as more than one ethnicity. The results were 81.6% European (Pākehā); 5.7% Māori; 1.1% Pasifika; 15.9% Asian; 1.4% Middle Eastern, Latin American and African New Zealanders (MELAA); and 2.7% other, which includes people giving their ethnicity as "New Zealander". English was spoken by 96.4%, Māori by 0.7%, Samoan by 0.5%, and other languages by 16.1%. No language could be spoken by 1.4% (e.g. too young to talk). New Zealand Sign Language was known by 0.2%. The percentage of people born overseas was 25.4, compared with 28.8% nationally.

Religious affiliations were 43.3% Christian, 0.7% Hindu, 0.2% Islam, 1.4% Buddhist, 0.2% Jewish, and 0.5% other religions. People who answered that they had no religion were 46.7%, and 6.8% of people did not answer the census question.

Of those at least 15 years old, 345 (30.6%) people had a bachelor's or higher degree, 594 (52.7%) had a post-high school certificate or diploma, and 192 (17.0%) people exclusively held high school qualifications. The median income was $45,300, compared with $41,500 nationally. 204 people (18.1%) earned over $100,000 compared to 12.1% nationally. The employment status of those at least 15 was 516 (45.7%) full-time, 192 (17.0%) part-time, and 18 (1.6%) unemployed.

== Economy ==
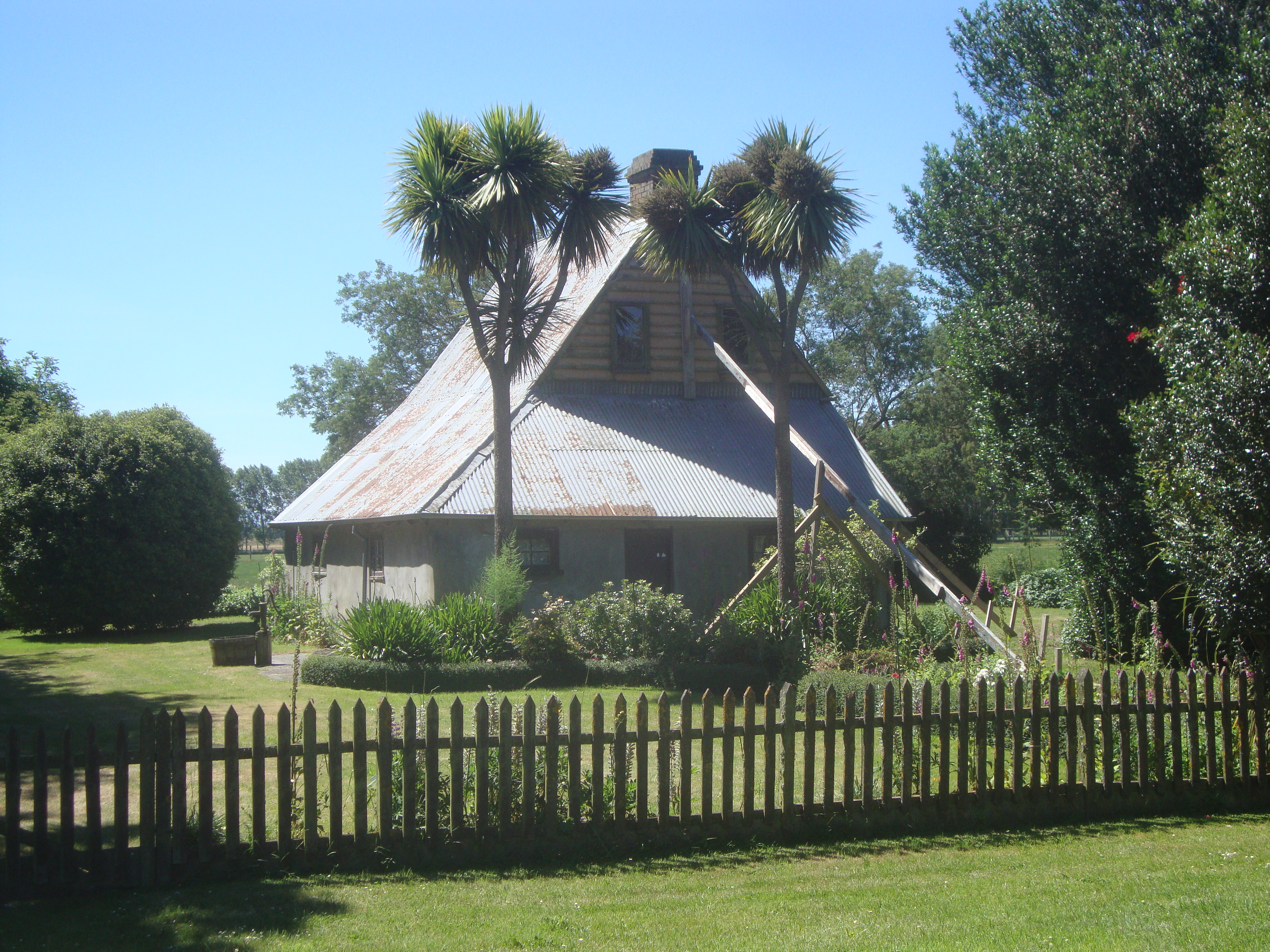
Tiptree Cottage is a historic cob cottage built in the 1860s.

In addition to State Highway 1 passing through the suburb, Harewood is a major transport hub for Christchurch and the South Island owing to Christchurch International Airport sitting within the suburb. The airport is the second-busiest in New Zealand after only Auckland Airport, bringing approximately 6.9 million passengers through Harewood in 2019. As a result of the airport, Harewood is also home to many freight and other industrial businesses which rely upon proximity to the airport, as well as rental car and campervan companies.

The suburb is also home to the International Antarctic Centre, a major Christchurch tourist attraction centred around the city's role as a departure point for many national Antarctic programmes. The centre was established in 1990, and is home to the administration offices of the New Zealand, United States, and Italian Antarctic programmes alongside multiple Antarctic-focused attractions. Hagglund armoured vehicles can occasionally be seen on roads around the centre, offering rides to tourists.

The median income of Harewood residents aged 15 or more was $29,900 per annum, $100 more than the median income for the whole of Christchurch city.

== Education ==
Harewood School is a contributing primary school catering for years 1 to 6. It had a roll of 152 as of March 2026. The school opened in 1862.
