= Northwood, New Zealand =

Suburb of Christchurch, New Zealand

Northwood
- Suburb
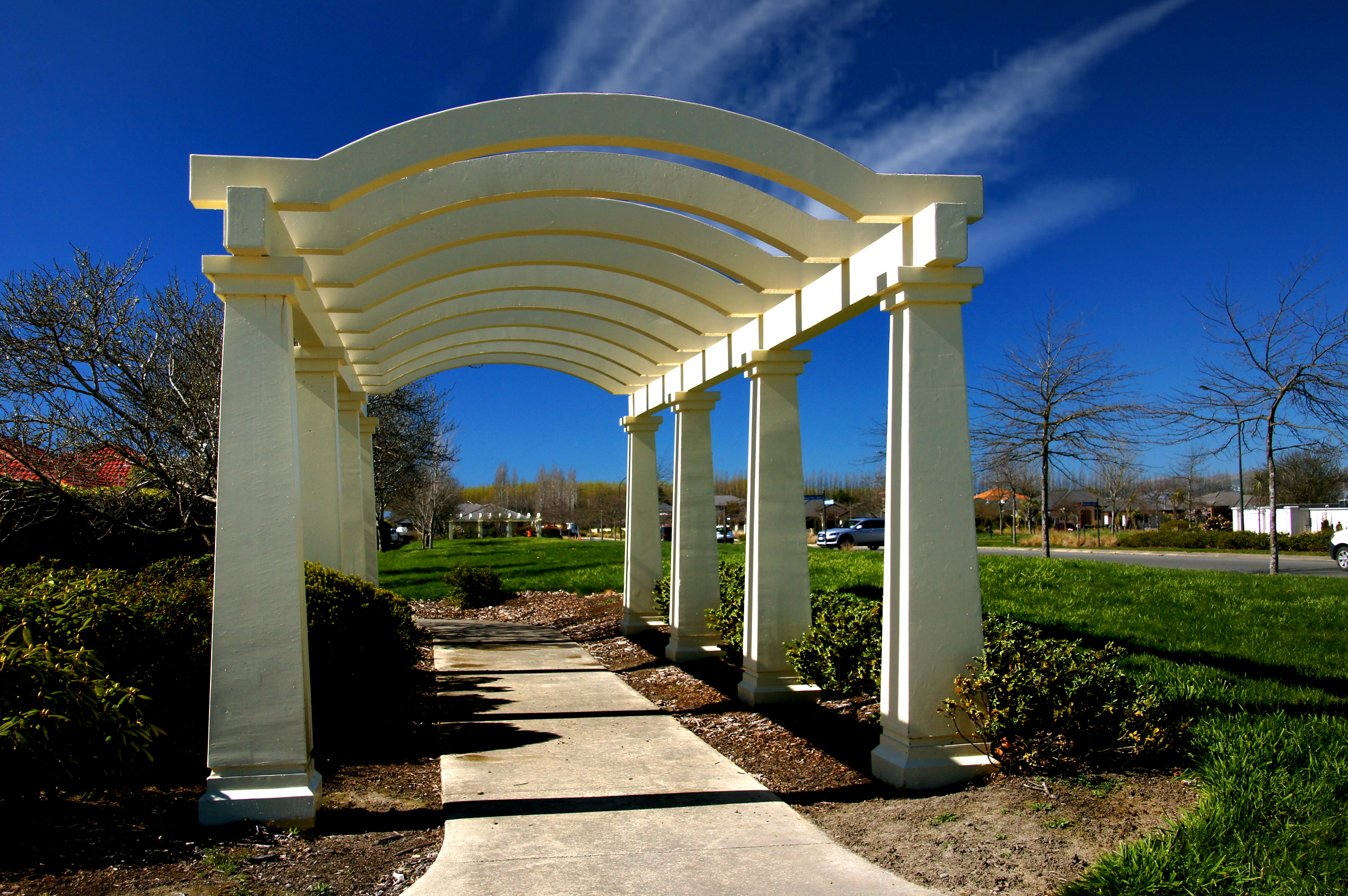
- Northwood Estate
- Interactive map of Northwood
- Coordinates: 43.458°S 172.616°E
- Country: New Zealand
- City: Christchurch
- Local authority: Christchurch City Council
- Electoral ward: Harewood
- Community board: Waimāero Fendalton-Waimairi-Harewood

Area
  - Land: 723 ha (1,790 acres)

Population (June 2025)
  - Total: 4,460
  - Density: 617/km^{2} (1,600/sq mi)

McLeans Island		Belfast
	Northwood	Bottle Lake
Harewood	Casebrook	Redwood

Northwood is a suburb on the northern outskirts of Christchurch city. It was developed in 2000 as a subdivision of Belfast on land previously used for apple orchards. The name "Northwood" was accepted at a meeting of the Shirley-Papanui Community Board on 2 February 2000.

Farmland north-west of what later became Northwood was developed into Peppers Clearwater Resort in 1998.

The Groynes is a large park between Northwood and Clearwater. Styx Mill Conservation Reserve is on the south side of Northwood.

== Demographics ==
Northwood, comprising the statistical areas of Northwood and Clearwater, covers 7.23 km^{2} (2.79 sq mi). It had an estimated population of 4,460 as of June 2025, with a population density of 617 people per km^{2}.

Historical population
Year	Pop.	±% p.a.
2006	2,973	—
2013	4,158	+4.91%
2018	4,266	+0.51%
2023	4,290	+0.11%

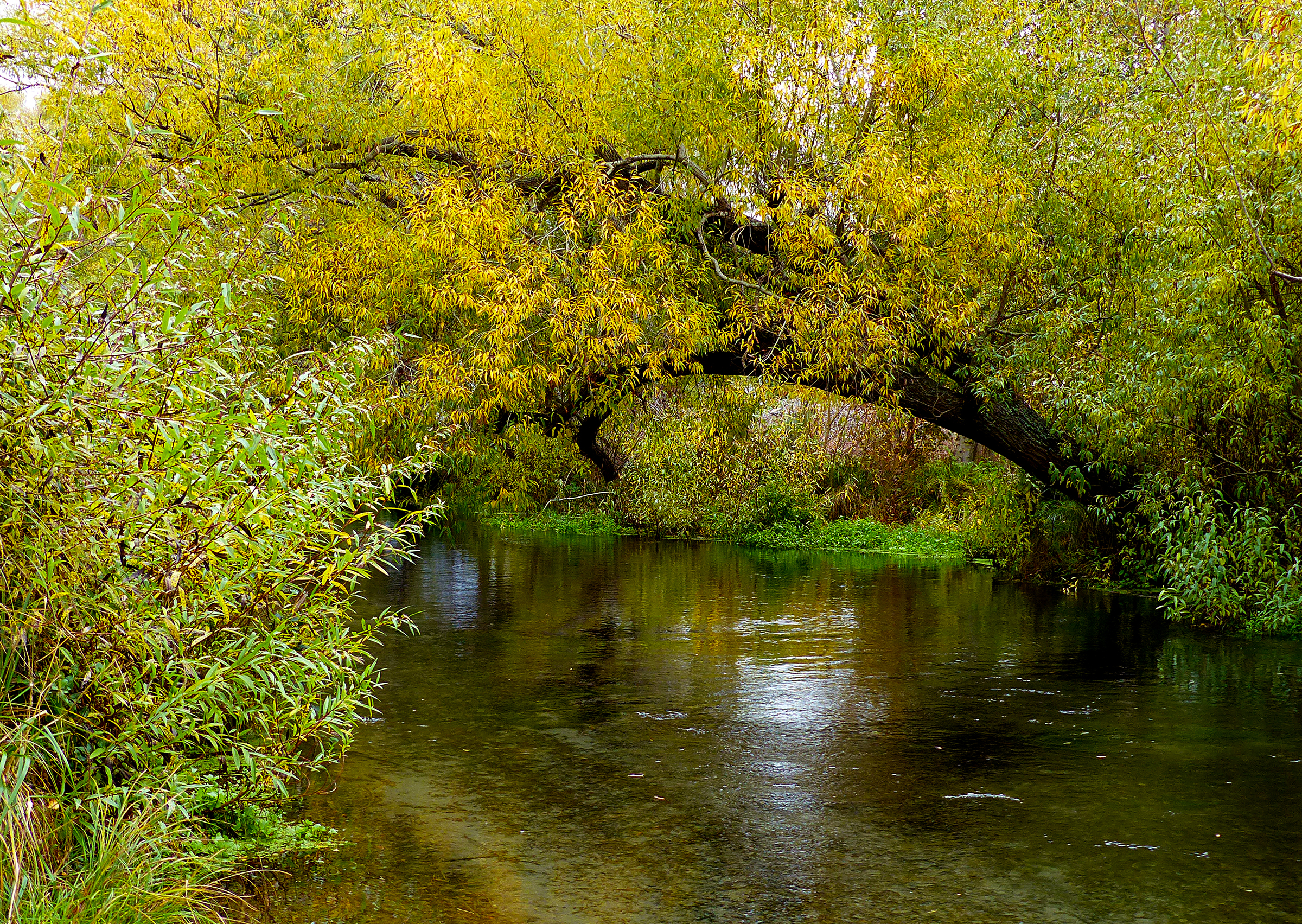
The Styx River flowing through The Groynes

Northwood had a population of 4,290 in the 2023 New Zealand census, an increase of 24 people (0.6%) since the 2018 census, and an increase of 132 people (3.2%) since the 2013 census. There were 2,097 males, 2,178 females, and 12 people of other genders in 1,707 dwellings. 2.5% of people identified as LGBTIQ+. The median age was 51.1 years (compared with 38.1 years nationally). There were 573 people (13.4%) aged under 15 years, 636 (14.8%) aged 15 to 29, 1,950 (45.5%) aged 30 to 64, and 1,125 (26.2%) aged 65 or older.

People could identify as more than one ethnicity. The results were 81.8% European (Pākehā); 5.1% Māori; 1.2% Pasifika; 15.9% Asian; 1.5% Middle Eastern, Latin American and African New Zealanders (MELAA); and 1.9% other, which includes people giving their ethnicity as "New Zealander". English was spoken by 96.6%, Māori by 0.9%, Samoan by 0.1%, and other languages by 15.6%. No language could be spoken by 1.3% (e.g. too young to talk). New Zealand Sign Language was known by 0.3%. The percentage of people born overseas was 24.3, compared with 28.8% nationally.

Religious affiliations were 42.5% Christian, 0.8% Hindu, 1.9% Islam, 0.1% Māori religious beliefs, 0.8% Buddhist, 0.1% New Age, 0.1% Jewish, and 1.2% other religions. People who answered that they had no religion were 46.4%, and 6.1% of people did not answer the census question.

Of those at least 15 years old, 993 (26.7%) people had a bachelor's or higher degree, 1,980 (53.3%) had a post-high school certificate or diploma, and 744 (20.0%) people exclusively held high school qualifications. The median income was $44,100, compared with $41,500 nationally. 684 people (18.4%) earned over $100,000 compared to 12.1% nationally. The employment status of those at least 15 was 1,767 (47.5%) full-time, 537 (14.4%) part-time, and 51 (1.4%) unemployed.

Individual statistical areas
Name	Area (km^{2})	Population	Density (per km^{2})	Dwellings	Median age	Median income
Clearwater	5.77	813	141	342	54.7 years	$50,100
Northwood	1.45	3,474	2,396	1,365	49.8 years	$43,000
New Zealand					38.1 years	$41,500

== Northwood Supa Centre ==
The Northwood Supa Centre shopping complex opened in the 2000s. It covers an area of 33,062 m^{2} and features 29 retailers, including Burnsco, PandaMart, Spotlight, Repco and Smiths City.
