= Kainga, New Zealand =

Settlement in Canterbury, New Zealand

Kainga
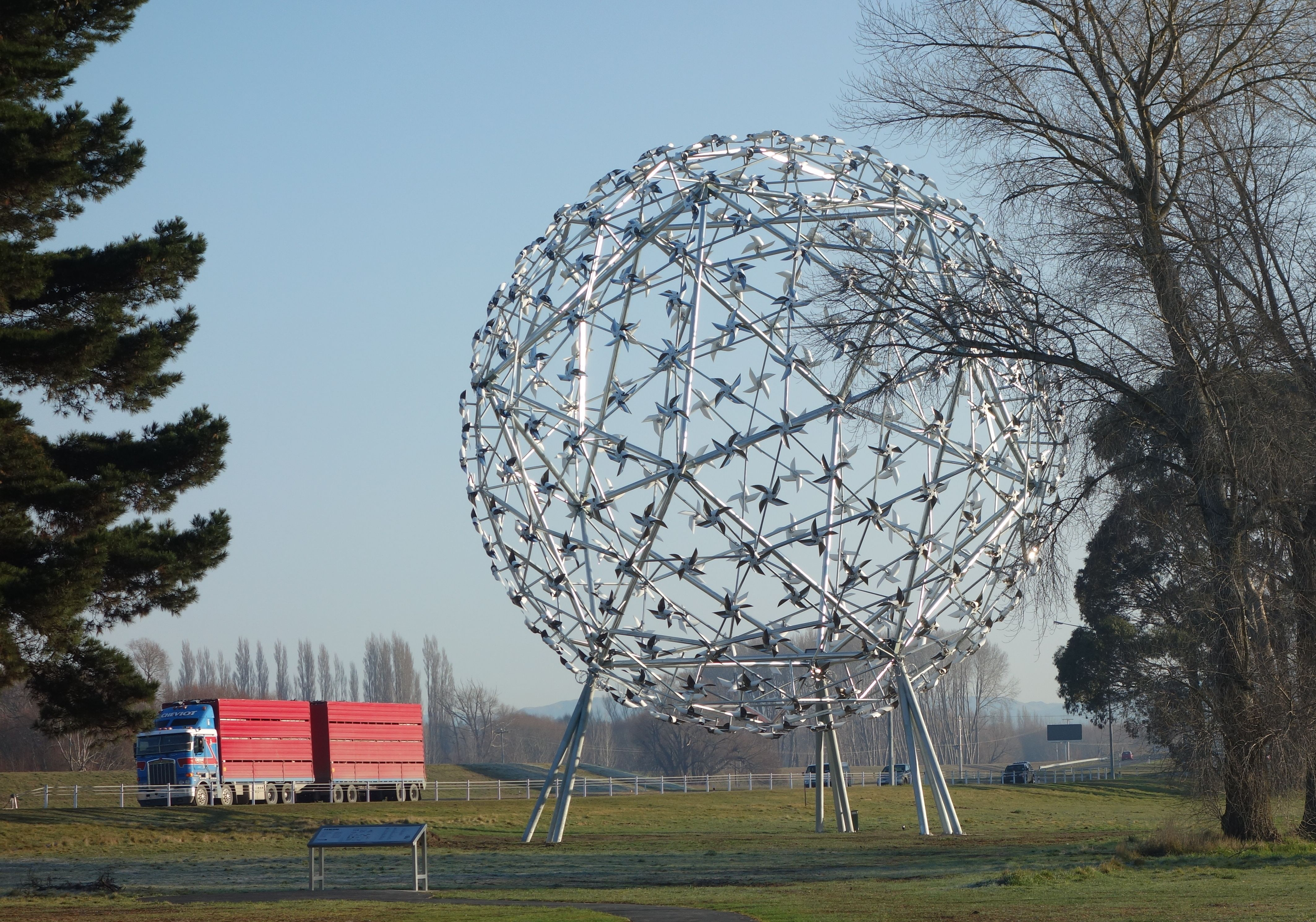
- Fanfare sculpture
- Interactive map of Kainga
- Coordinates: 43°24′39″S 172°39′45″E
- Country: New Zealand
- Region: Canterbury
- Territorial authority: Christchurch City
- Ward: Harewood; Coastal
- Community: Waimāero Fendalton-Waimairi-Harewood; Waitai Coastal-Burwood-Linwood
- Electorates: Waimakariri; Christchurch East; Te Tai Tonga (Māori)

Government
  - Territorial Authority: Christchurch City Council
  - Regional council: Environment Canterbury
  - Mayor of Christchurch: Phil Mauger
  - Waimakariri MP/Christchurch East MP: Matt Doocey/Reuben Davidson
  - Te Tai Tonga MP: Tākuta Ferris

Area
  - Total: 2.87 km^{2} (1.11 sq mi)

Population (June 2025)
  - Total: 480
  - Density: 170/km^{2} (430/sq mi)

Kainga is a settlement on the southern bank of the Waimakariri River, just north of Christchurch, in Canterbury, New Zealand. It lies immediately to the south of Kaiapoi, on a small road leading northeast from State Highway 1.

Originally established as a small group of fishing huts on the south side of the Waimakariri, it later developed into a small residential area. A small forestry plantation lies to the southeast of the settlement.

== Demographics ==
Kainga is described by Stats NZ as a rural settlement, which covers 2.87 km^{2} (1.11 sq mi). It is part of the larger Styx statistical area.

Historical population
Year	Pop.	±% p.a.
2006	195	—
2013	441	+12.36%
2018	459	+0.80%
2023	450	−0.40%
The 2006 population is for a smaller area of 2.37 km^{2}. Source:

Kainga had a population of 450 in the 2023 New Zealand census, a decrease of 9 people (−2.0%) since the 2018 census, and an increase of 9 people (2.0%) since the 2013 census. There were 234 males, 210 females, and 3 people of other genders in 195 dwellings. 4.0% of people identified as LGBTIQ+. The median age was 45.1 years (compared with 38.1 years nationally). There were 66 people (14.7%) aged under 15 years, 66 (14.7%) aged 15 to 29, 246 (54.7%) aged 30 to 64, and 72 (16.0%) aged 65 or older.

People could identify as more than one ethnicity. The results were 90.7% European (Pākehā), 12.0% Māori, 2.0% Pasifika, 5.3% Asian, and 2.7% other, which includes people giving their ethnicity as "New Zealander". English was spoken by 96.7%, Māori by 1.3%, and other languages by 5.3%. No language could be spoken by 2.7% (e.g. too young to talk). New Zealand Sign Language was known by 0.7%. The percentage of people born overseas was 12.7, compared with 28.8% nationally.

Religious affiliations were 20.0% Christian, 0.7% Hindu, 0.7% Islam, 0.7% Māori religious beliefs, 0.7% Buddhist, 0.7% New Age, and 1.3% other religions. People who answered that they had no religion were 68.7%, and 8.7% of people did not answer the census question.

Of those at least 15 years old, 45 (11.7%) people had a bachelor's or higher degree, 219 (57.0%) had a post-high school certificate or diploma, and 108 (28.1%) people exclusively held high school qualifications. The median income was $42,500, compared with $41,500 nationally. 15 people (3.9%) earned over $100,000 compared to 12.1% nationally. The employment status of those at least 15 was 204 (53.1%) full-time, 48 (12.5%) part-time, and 6 (1.6%) unemployed.
