= Northcote, Christchurch =

Suburb of Christchurch, New Zealand

Northcote
- Suburb
- Interactive map of Northcote
- Coordinates: 43.488°S 172.616°E
- Country: New Zealand
- City: Christchurch
- Local authority: Christchurch City Council
- Electoral ward: Papanui
- Community board: Waipapa Papanui-Innes-Central

Area
  - Land: 180 ha (440 acres)

Population (June 2025)
  - Total: 2,750
  - Density: 1,500/km^{2} (4,000/sq mi)

Casebrook	Redwood	Marshland
	Northcote	Mairehau
Papanui		St Albans

Northcote (/ˈnɔːrθkət/ NORTH-kuht) is a suburb on the northern side of Christchurch, New Zealand.

== Etymology ==
The suburb is named for the British politician, Stafford Northcote (1818–1887).

== Demographics ==
Northcote covers 1.80 km^{2} (0.69 sq mi). It had an estimated population of 2,750 as of June 2025, with a population density of 1,528 people per km^{2}.

Historical population
Year	Pop.	±% p.a.
2006	2,547	—
2013	2,532	−0.08%
2018	2,625	+0.72%
2023	2,574	−0.39%
The 2006 population is for a smaller area of 1.68 km^{2}. Source:

Northcote had a population of 2,574 in the 2023 New Zealand census, a decrease of 51 people (−1.9%) since the 2018 census, and an increase of 42 people (1.7%) since the 2013 census. There were 1,251 males, 1,314 females, and 12 people of other genders in 1,065 dwellings. 3.4% of people identified as LGBTIQ+. The median age was 38.7 years (compared with 38.1 years nationally). There were 426 people (16.6%) aged under 15 years, 531 (20.6%) aged 15 to 29, 1,167 (45.3%) aged 30 to 64, and 453 (17.6%) aged 65 or older.

People could identify as more than one ethnicity. The results were 68.2% European (Pākehā); 10.1% Māori; 4.1% Pasifika; 25.2% Asian; 1.7% Middle Eastern, Latin American and African New Zealanders (MELAA); and 2.3% other, which includes people giving their ethnicity as "New Zealander". English was spoken by 96.2%, Māori by 1.6%, Samoan by 0.9%, and other languages by 20.6%. No language could be spoken by 1.5% (e.g. too young to talk). New Zealand Sign Language was known by 0.7%. The percentage of people born overseas was 31.5, compared with 28.8% nationally.

Religious affiliations were 37.4% Christian, 2.7% Hindu, 1.3% Islam, 0.5% Māori religious beliefs, 1.2% Buddhist, 0.3% New Age, and 1.6% other religions. People who answered that they had no religion were 49.4%, and 5.8% of people did not answer the census question.

Of those at least 15 years old, 513 (23.9%) people had a bachelor's or higher degree, 1,074 (50.0%) had a post-high school certificate or diploma, and 564 (26.3%) people exclusively held high school qualifications. The median income was $39,100, compared with $41,500 nationally. 153 people (7.1%) earned over $100,000 compared to 12.1% nationally. The employment status of those at least 15 was 1,116 (52.0%) full-time, 315 (14.7%) part-time, and 60 (2.8%) unemployed.
