= Belfast, New Zealand =

Suburb of Christchurch, New Zealand

Belfast
- Suburb
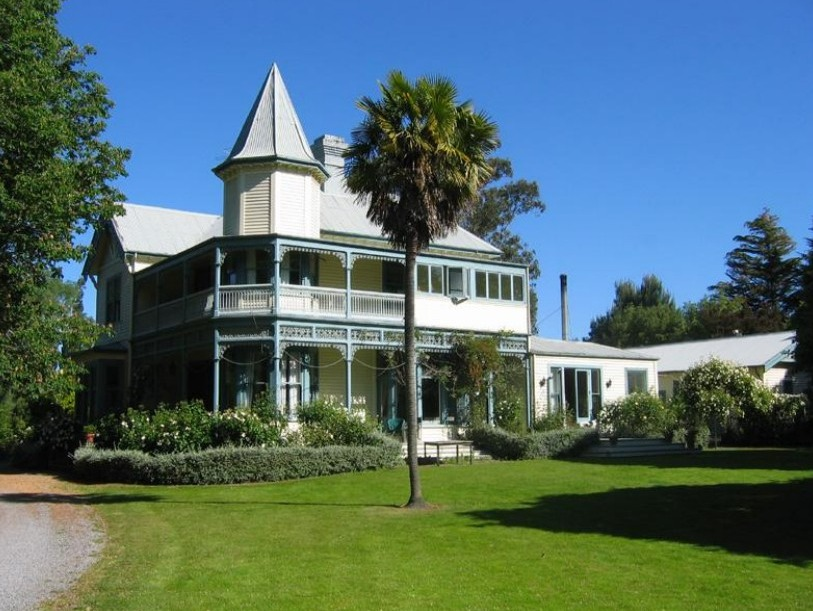
- Blakes Road Historic House in Belfast
- Interactive map of Belfast
- Coordinates: 43°27′S 172°38′E
- Country: New Zealand
- City: Christchurch
- Local authority: Christchurch City Council
- Electoral ward: Harewood
- Community board: Waimāero Fendalton-Waimairi-Harewood

Area
  - Land: 657 ha (1,620 acres)

Population (June 2025)
  - Total: 5,280
  - Density: 804/km^{2} (2,080/sq mi)

	(Waimakariri River)	Kainga
(The Groynes)	Belfast
	Northwood	Bottle Lake

Belfast (Māori: Purarekanui) is a suburb of Christchurch, New Zealand. It is in the north of the city 10 km (6.2 mi) from Cathedral Square, close to the banks of the Waimakariri River.

== History ==
Belfast is named after Belfast in Northern Ireland. It was originally known as North Road District, Seven Mile Peg, Styx, or by its Māori name Purarekanui.

James McNeight Watt (1838–1892) emigrated from Belfast and was a partner with the original meat works, around which the settlement grew. Watt, who developed much of the area, is believed to have given it its present name.

== Demographics ==
Belfast, comprising the statistical areas of Belfast West and Belfast East, covers 6.57 km^{2} (2.54 sq mi). It had an estimated population of 5,280 as of June 2025, with a population density of 804 people per km^{2}.

Historical population
Year	Pop.	±% p.a.
2006	3,669	—
2013	3,888	+0.83%
2018	4,227	+1.69%
2023	4,668	+2.00%
The 2006 population is for a smaller area of 5.98 km^{2}. Source:

Belfast had a population of 4,668 in the 2023 New Zealand census, an increase of 441 people (10.4%) since the 2018 census, and an increase of 780 people (20.1%) since the 2013 census. There were 2,286 males, 2,370 females, and 12 people of other genders in 1,845 dwellings. 3.7% of people identified as LGBTIQ+. The median age was 38.0 years (compared with 38.1 years nationally). There were 828 people (17.7%) aged under 15 years, 849 (18.2%) aged 15 to 29, 2,244 (48.1%) aged 30 to 64, and 747 (16.0%) aged 65 or older.

People could identify as more than one ethnicity. The results were 81.7% European (Pākehā); 12.2% Māori; 3.3% Pasifika; 12.1% Asian; 1.5% Middle Eastern, Latin American and African New Zealanders (MELAA); and 2.6% other, which includes people giving their ethnicity as "New Zealander". English was spoken by 96.2%, Māori by 2.2%, Samoan by 0.8%, and other languages by 12.3%. No language could be spoken by 2.4% (e.g. too young to talk). New Zealand Sign Language was known by 0.6%. The percentage of people born overseas was 21.3, compared with 28.8% nationally.

Religious affiliations were 31.4% Christian, 2.3% Hindu, 0.9% Islam, 0.3% Māori religious beliefs, 1.1% Buddhist, 0.4% New Age, and 1.9% other religions. People who answered that they had no religion were 55.2%, and 6.6% of people did not answer the census question.

Of those at least 15 years old, 717 (18.7%) people had a bachelor's or higher degree, 2,127 (55.4%) had a post-high school certificate or diploma, and 996 (25.9%) people exclusively held high school qualifications. The median income was $44,300, compared with $41,500 nationally. 330 people (8.6%) earned over $100,000 compared to 12.1% nationally. The employment status of those at least 15 was 2,136 (55.6%) full-time, 495 (12.9%) part-time, and 102 (2.7%) unemployed.

Individual statistical areas
Name	Area (km^{2})	Population	Density (per km^{2})	Dwellings	Median age	Median income
Belfast West	2.60	1,908	734	738	39.3 years	$44,400
Belfast East	3.96	2,760	697	1,107	37.4 years	$44,100
New Zealand					38.1 years	$41,500

== Economy ==
Belfast has had a freezing works since 1883. It is now owned by Silver Fern Farms. The nearest shopping complex is at Northwood Supa Centre.

== Education ==
Pūtahi Belfast School is a contributing primary school catering for years 1 to 8. It has two campuses, a junior campus for years 1-4 and a senior campus for years 5-8. It had a roll of 412 as of March 2026. The school opened in 1878.

== Sport ==
Belfast is home to the Belfast Rugby Club, which competes in the Christchurch rugby competition. The team's colours are green and gold. Its main sports ground is Sheldon Park. The northern end of the suburb houses light industry.

== Notable people ==
- Shane Bond (Former player for New Zealand Black Caps cricket team)
- Bill Bush (former All-Black) Now President Belfast Rugby Club (Cobras)
- Craig Green (former All Black)
- Jamie Nutbrown Former Canterbury Crusaders halfback, also a former Super Rugby referee.
- Wayne Smith (All Black's assistant coach)
- Mabel Whitaker (1884–1976), teacher and local historian.
- Lewis Brown (Former New Zealand Kiwi League player) and New Zealand Warriors
