= McLeans Grassland Reserve =

Scenic reserve west of Christchurch, New Zealand

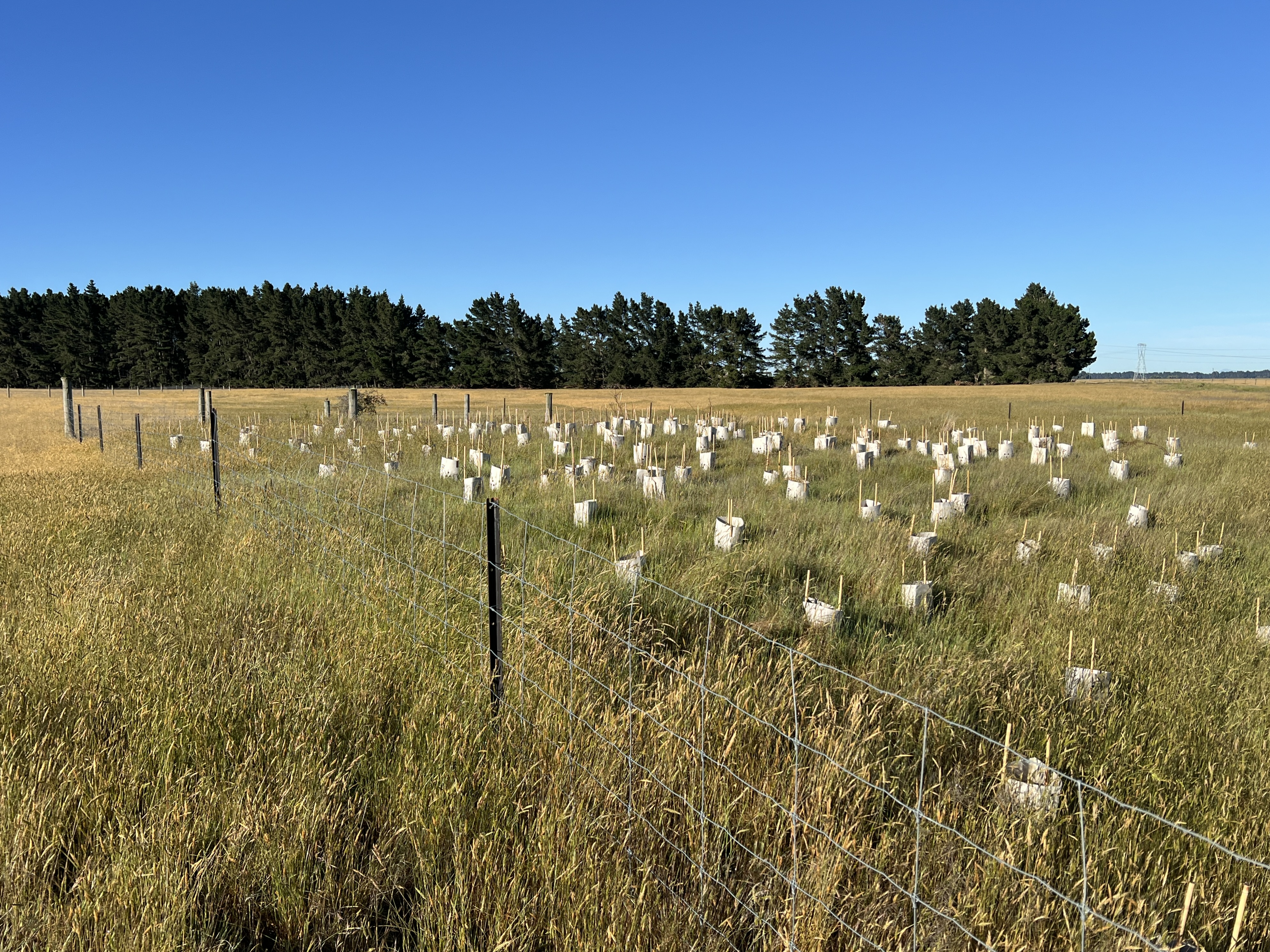
- Interactive map of McLeans Grassland Reserve
- Location: Canterbury Plains
- Nearest city: Christchurch
- Coordinates: 43°28′34″S 172°30′14″E
- Area: 154 hectares (380 acres)
- Elevation: 10 m (32.81 ft)
- Created: 2021
- Etymology: From McLeans Island and the McLean brothers
- Operator: Christchurch City Council

McLeans Grassland Reserve, also known as McLeans Grassland Park, is a public scenic reserve west of Christchurch, New Zealand. It is one of the few remaining examples of a pre-human Canterbury Plains dryland ecosystem and contains several rare or endangered species.

== Geography ==
The reserve encompasses 154 hectares (380 acres) of flat grassland to the west of Christchurch city on the South Island of New Zealand, between McLeans Island Road and the Old West Coast Road. It is south of McLeans Island and Orana Wildlife Park, and Christchurch Airport is directly to the east. The reserve is fenced, and internally some individual plants and areas of restoration planting are also fenced off, but public access is allowed through stiles on Conservators Road and McLeans Island Road, linked by the Christchurch 360 Trail.

== History ==
Before humans reached New Zealand, the Canterbury Plains was covered in a mosaic of forest, shrubland, and grassland, created by braided rivers changing their course. The area around McLeans Island would have been a mixture of tussock, shrubs like matagouri (Discaria toumatou), and fast-growing trees like kōwhai (Sophora microphylla) and cabbage tree (Cordyline australis). When the Polynesian ancestors of Māori arrive 750 years ago they destroyed almost all the forest cover of the plains by burning, replacing it with tussock grassland. The first European settlers rapidly converted this into sheep grazing and then into managed pasture. By the end of the 20th century less than 1 per cent of the Canterbury Plains' native plant cover remained.

McLeans Island takes its name from the McLean brothers, Allan and John, who in 1852 purchased the Ashfield run south of the Waimakariri River to farm sheep. At this time a portion of the Waimakariri left the main flow and rejoined downstream, creating an island. Subsequent stopbanks and flood protection works, mostly after significant flooding of Christchurch by the Waimakariri in the 1930s, constrained the flow of the river, and removed the side channel; McLeans Island is no longer an island, but the name has persisted.

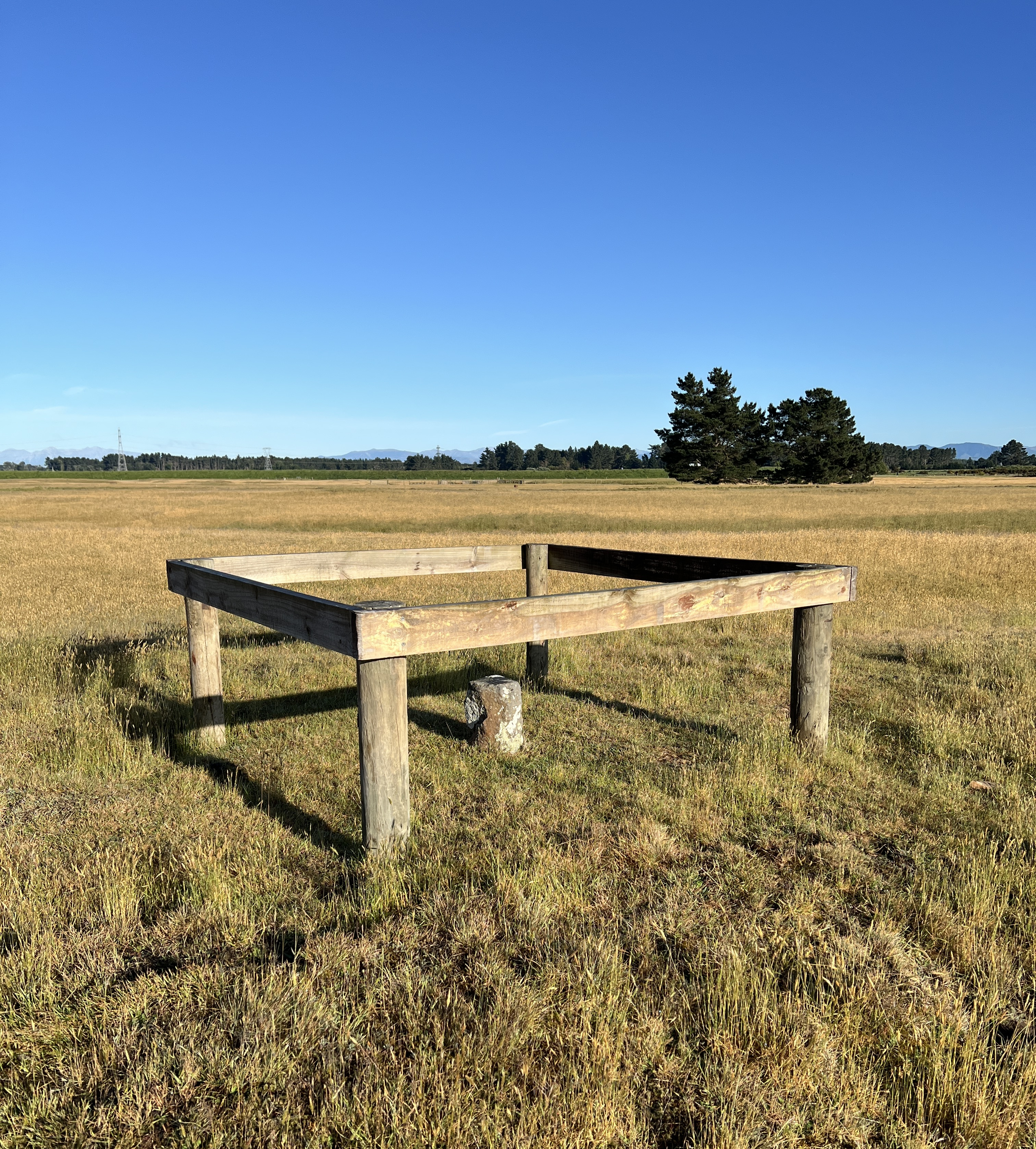
Dobson Benchmark stone

One feature of the reserve is a Dobson Benchmark stone, one of a series named after the first Provincial Engineer for Canterbury, Edward Dobson. In the 1860s twenty-eight Dobson stones were placed at 0.5-mile (800 m) intervals over a distance of 13.5 miles (21.7 km), with the goal of measuring any change in riverbed elevation and river channels. Only nine of these stones remain in situ (two have been removed and 17 are missing presumed lost).

== Ecology ==
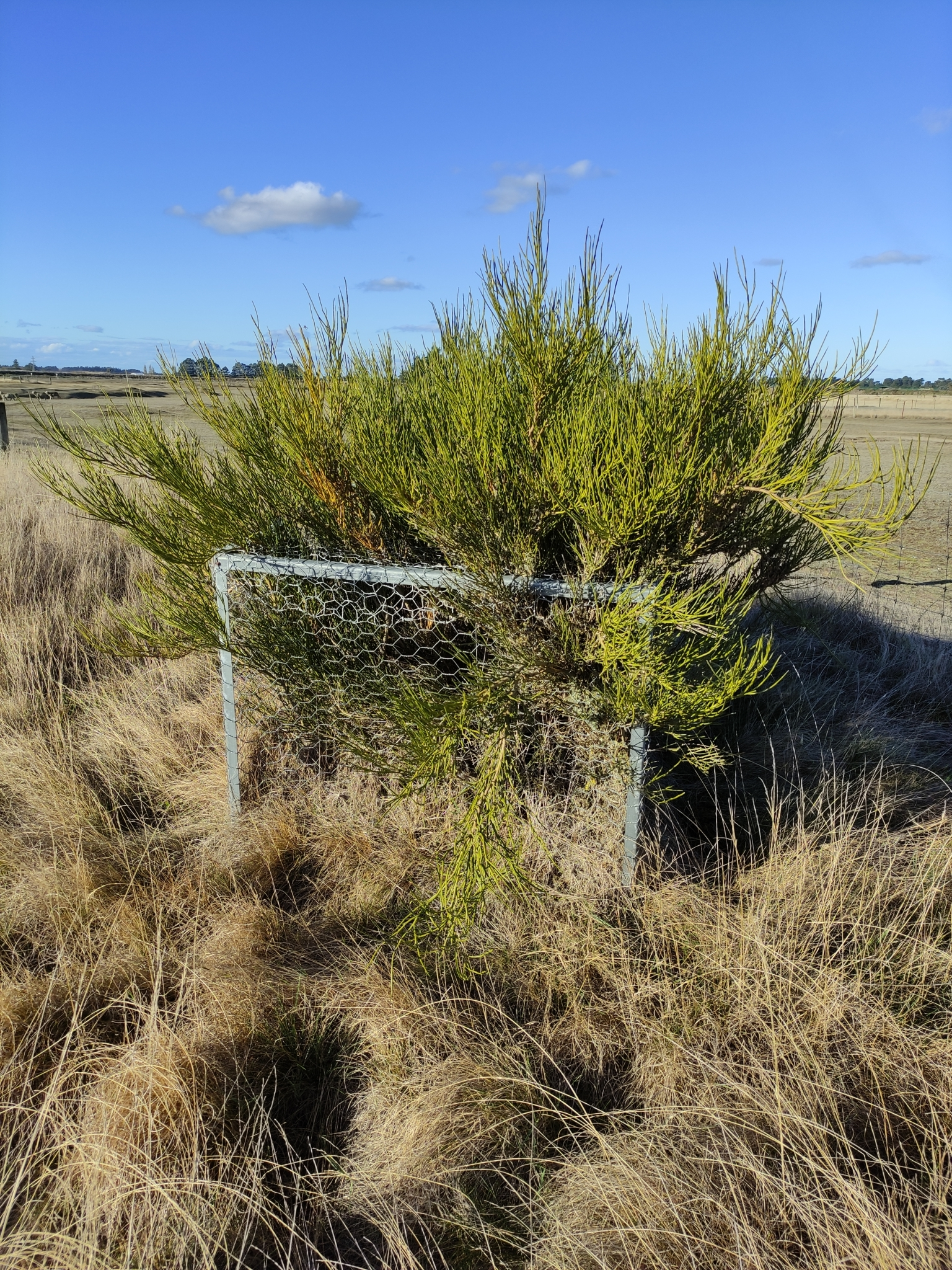
Carmichaelia australis in protective cage

The McLeans Grassland Reserve and an adjacent 3000 ha of dry plains managed by Environment Canterbury together represent the "largest contiguous area of largely undeveloped alluvial soils remaining on the Canterbury Plains", according to ecologist Nicholas Head. The area's soils are shallow, stony, and free-draining, part of the recent Rangitata 6 series made up of greywacke, gravel, and sand. This alluvial soil built up from repeated flooding by the Waimakariri over thousands of years, until its flow was constrained. Despite looking uniform and flat, the reserve is crossed by shallow stony channels, dotted by mounds, and is divided by an artificial water race. The area has a mild, dry climate and is prone to summer drought.

Early observers described this part of the Canterbury Plains as "grassland", "fernland", and "sandy knolls with scattered tussocks". J. B. Armstrong writing in 1879 noted "a few patches of shrubs were occasionally to be found on the plains", comprising matagouri (Discaria toumatou), Coprosma propinqua, Olearia adenocarpa, and Ozothamnus vauvilliersii. "The common cabbage tree of the South Island…was formerly rather common, and helped to enliven what was at best a dreary scene."

=== Flora ===
After flooding of the area was stopped, the native tussock grassland began to be replaced by bushes and small trees like kōwhai (Sophora microphylla). Aerial photos around 1940 depict scattered shrubs, silver tussock (Poa cita), and bracken (Pteridium esculentum). Since then grazing by livestock, mostly sheep, and by rabbits and hares has eliminated most trees and shrubs and reduced the reserve's vegetation to a ground cover of woolly moss (Racomitrium pruinosum) interspersed with exotic pasture grasses. Several native species persist in small numbers, including prostrate kōwhai (Sophora prostrata), adder's tongue fern (Ophioglossum coriaceum), sun orchids (Thelymitra longifolia and T. paucifolia), and onion orchid (Microtis unifolia).

The reserve contains several threatened plant species, including the critically endangered Canterbury Plains tree daisy (Olearia adenocarpa), turnip-rooted geranium (Geranium retrorsum), leafless pohuehue (Muehlenbeckia ephedroides), and fan-leaved daisy (Raoulia monroi). Other native species considered at risk and declining include prickly couch (Zoysia minima), multi-headed orchid (Pterostylis tristis), dryland button daisy (Leptinella serrulata), common broom (Carmichaelia australis), and Solander's geranium (Geranium solanderi).

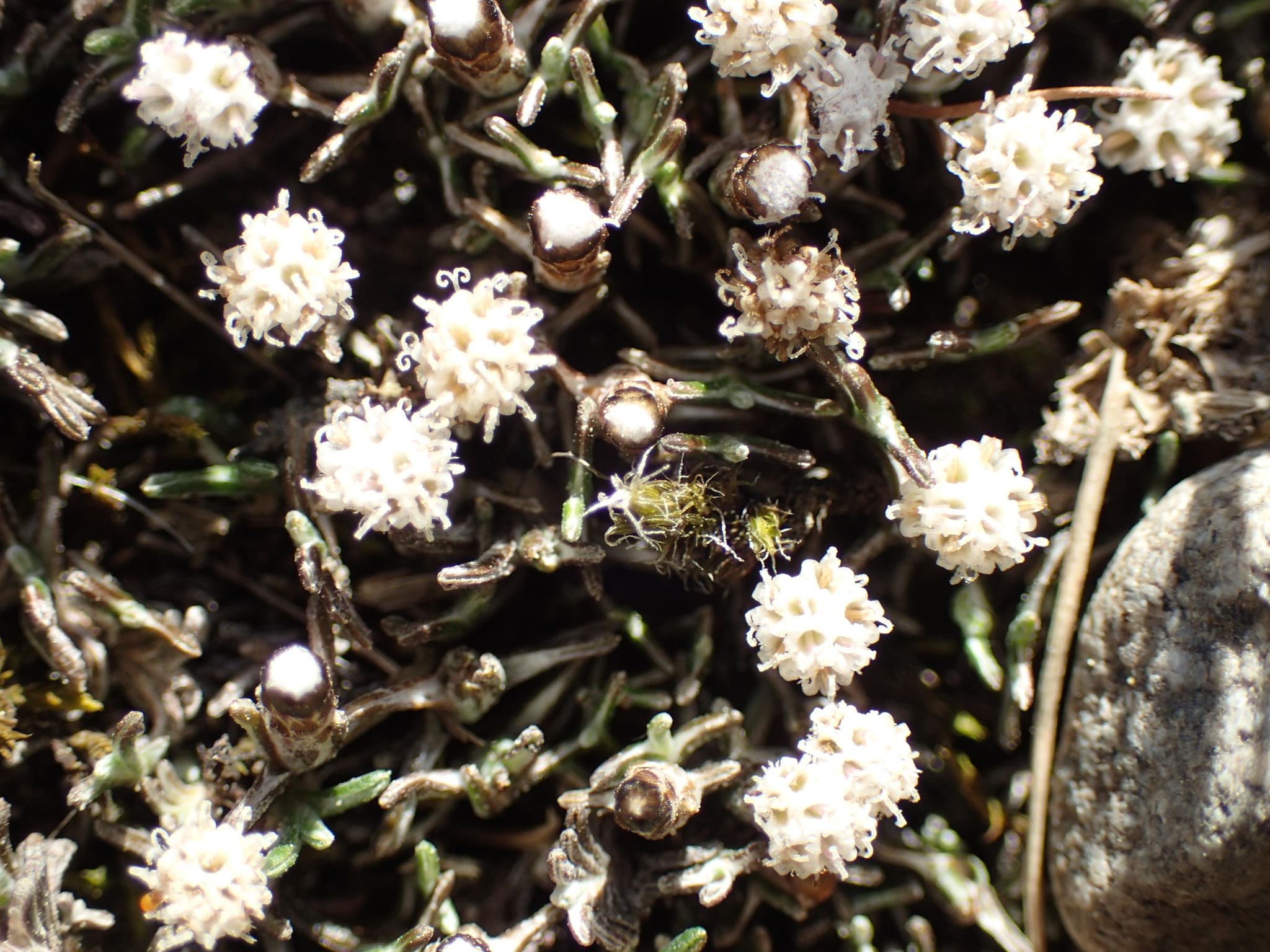
Raoulia monroi

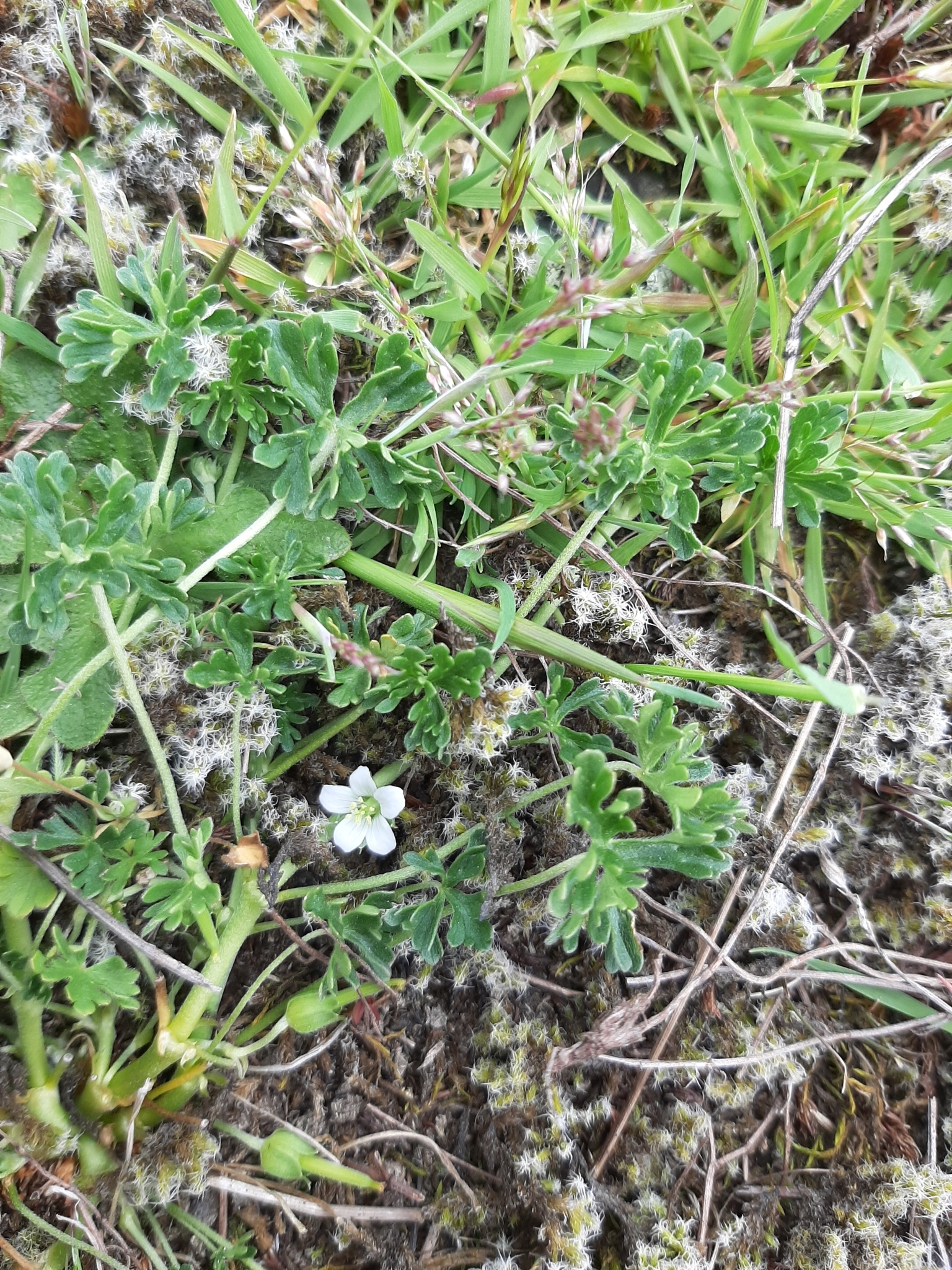
Geranium retrorsum

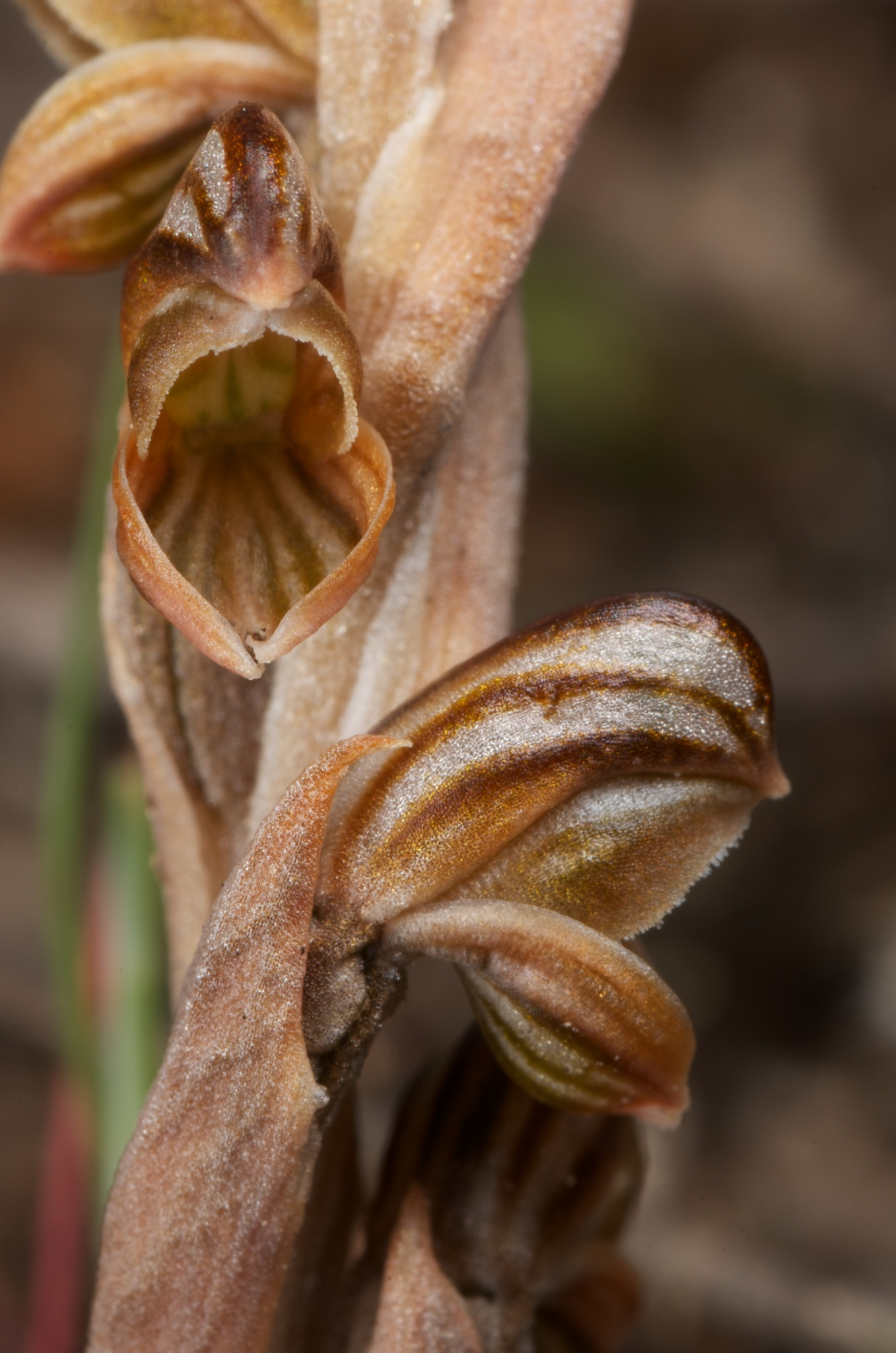
Pterostylis tristis

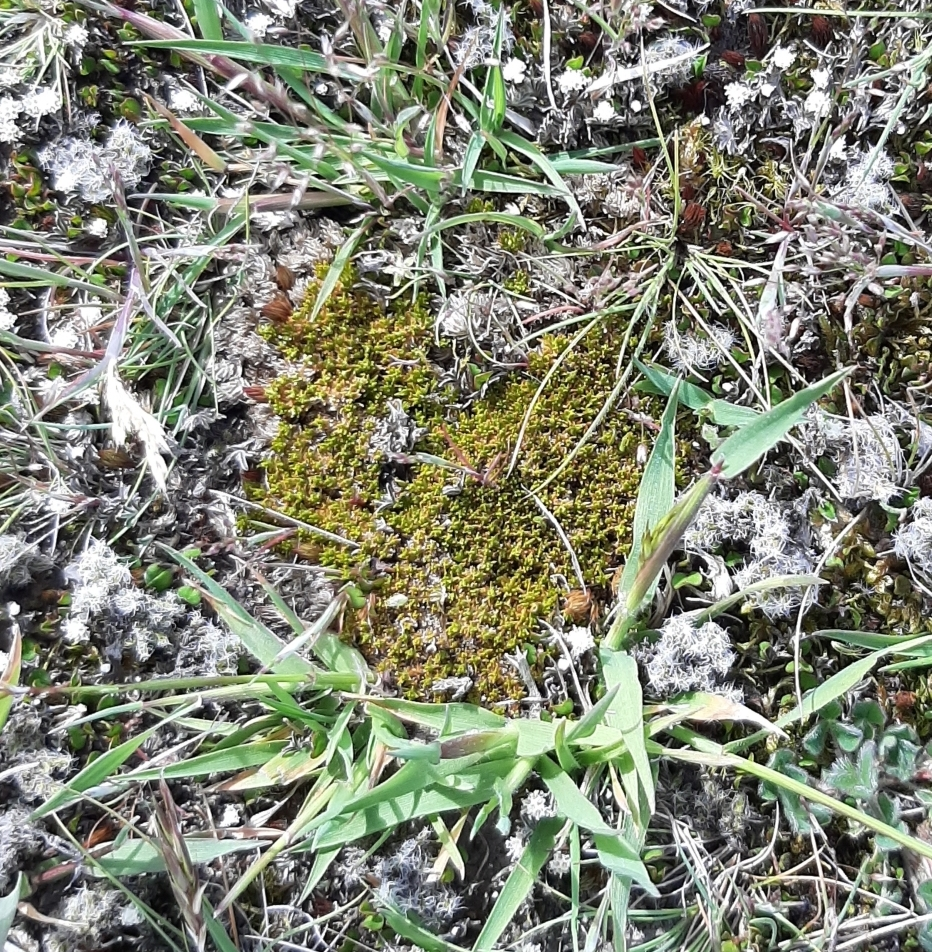
Scleranthus uniflorus

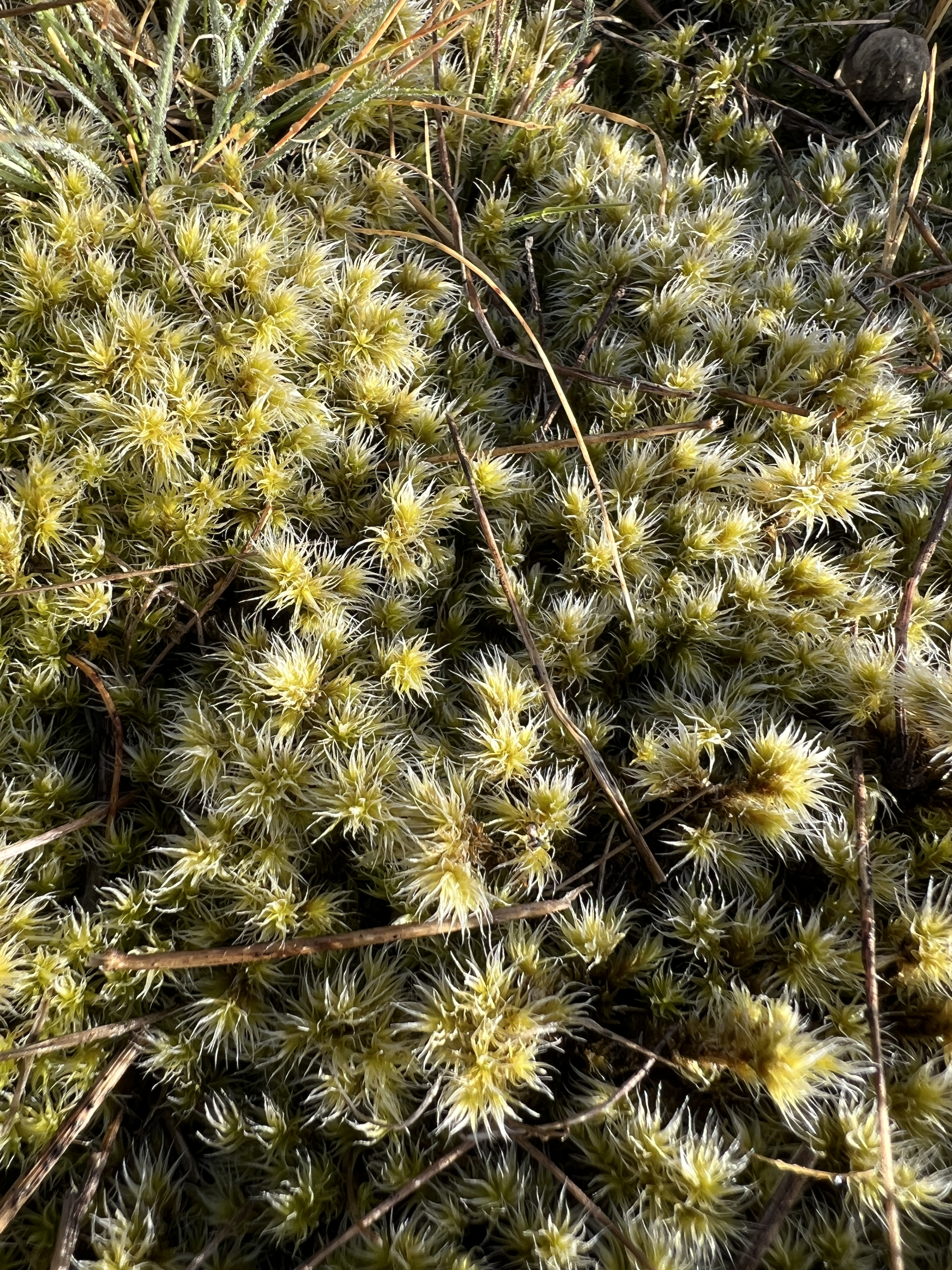
Racomitrium pruinosum

=== Fauna ===
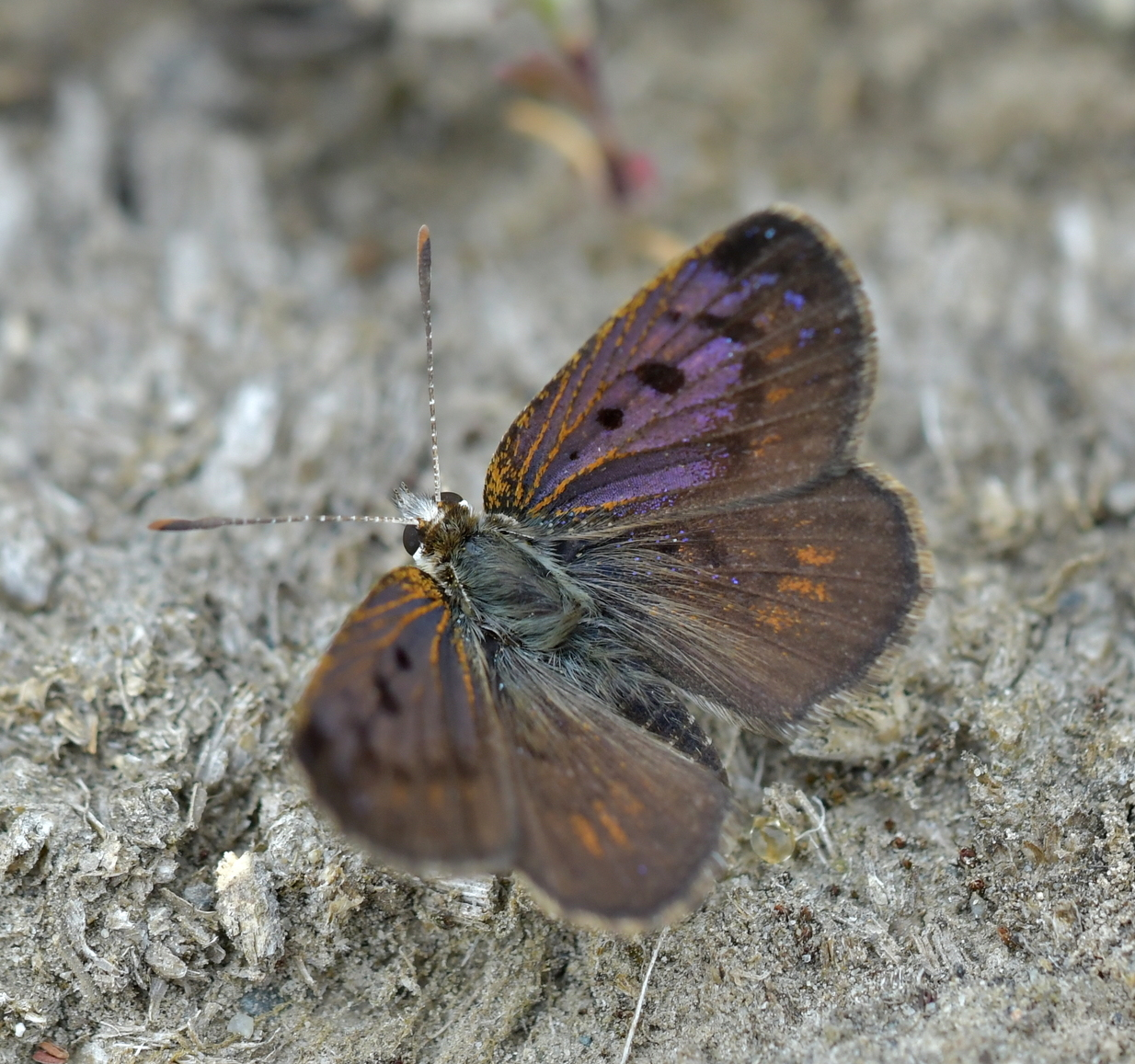
Undescribed McLeans Island Lycaena species

The Canterbury spotted skink (Oligosoma aff. lineoocellatum 'central Canterbury') is present in the reserve, along with southern grass skinks (Oligosoma aff. polychrome Clade 5), Waitaha geckos (Woodworthia brunnea), and McCann's skink (Oligosoma maccanni). Boulder copper butterflies (Lycaena sp.) represent an undescribed species of copper butterfly endemic to the McLeans Island area, feeding on creeping pohuehue (Muehlenbeckia axillaris). Common native birds are pipits (Anthus novaeseelandiae), paradise shelducks (Tadorna variegata), banded dotterels (Charadrius bicinctus), kahu (Circus approximans), and occasionally black-fronted terns (Chlidonias albostriatus).

== Management ==
Some remnant kōwhai savannah woodland near Christchurch had already been set aside as a reserve in the 1980s, and the importance of the least-modified grassland near McLeans island was recognised in the 1990s. On 24 May 2001 the Christchurch City Council resolved to create a scenic reserve in the area, but although the land was functionally managed as a reserve, formally implementing this took nearly 20 years, and McLeans Grassland Reserve was finally gazetted on 8 March 2021.

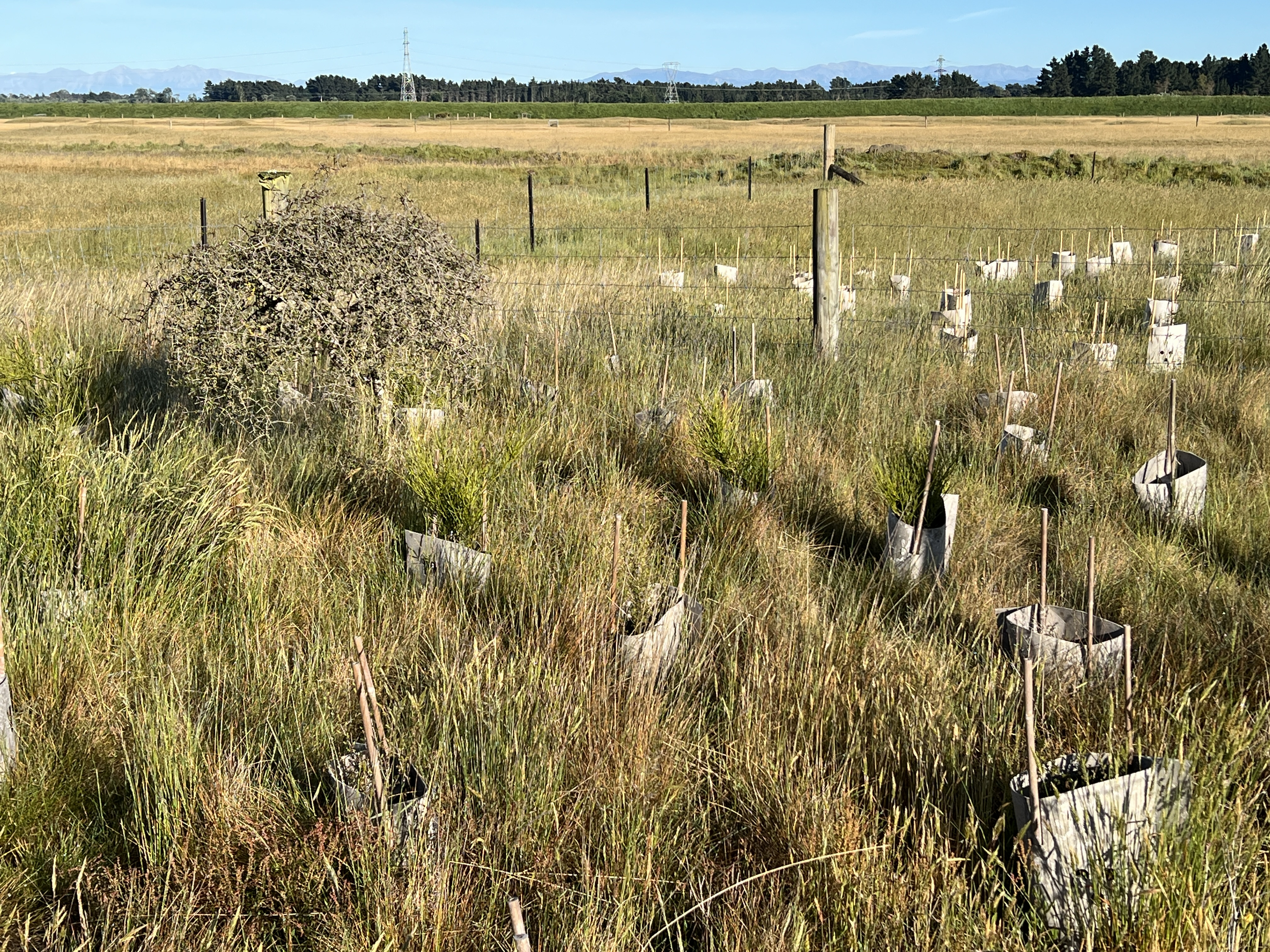
Matagouri (Discaria toumatou) and restoration planting

Restoration efforts consist of fencing off individual shrubs and some areas where restoration planting is taking place. Strategic grazing is part of the reserve's management plan, because in some plots where sheep have been excluded exotic pasture grasses threaten to overwhelm the native plant species. Areas that would have been bare gravel created by flooding are being colonised by grasses, and the 2024 management plan proposed creating new bare areas for species like Raoulia australis and Scleranthus uniflorus. Rabbit-proof fencing has been employed to protect shrubs until they are large enough to resist grazing by sheep and fences can be removed; rabbits, gorse, and broom will eventually be eradicated from the reserve and predators controlled.

The area around McLeans Grassland Reserve is not under threat of development because of the poor soil, noise from the neighbouring Christchurch Airport, and a groundwater protection zone to safeguard Christchurch's aquifer. Nevertheless, on 15 November 2025 the Mayor of Christchuch Phil Mauger declared that McLeans Grassland Reserve was "a bit of dirt that only grows rabbits, rocks and grass", and it would be a perfect site for a solar farm, which could be built "without too much hassle". "It's going to cause a bit of a furore, I'm sure," he added.

== See also ==
- Conservation in New Zealand
- Canterbury Plains
