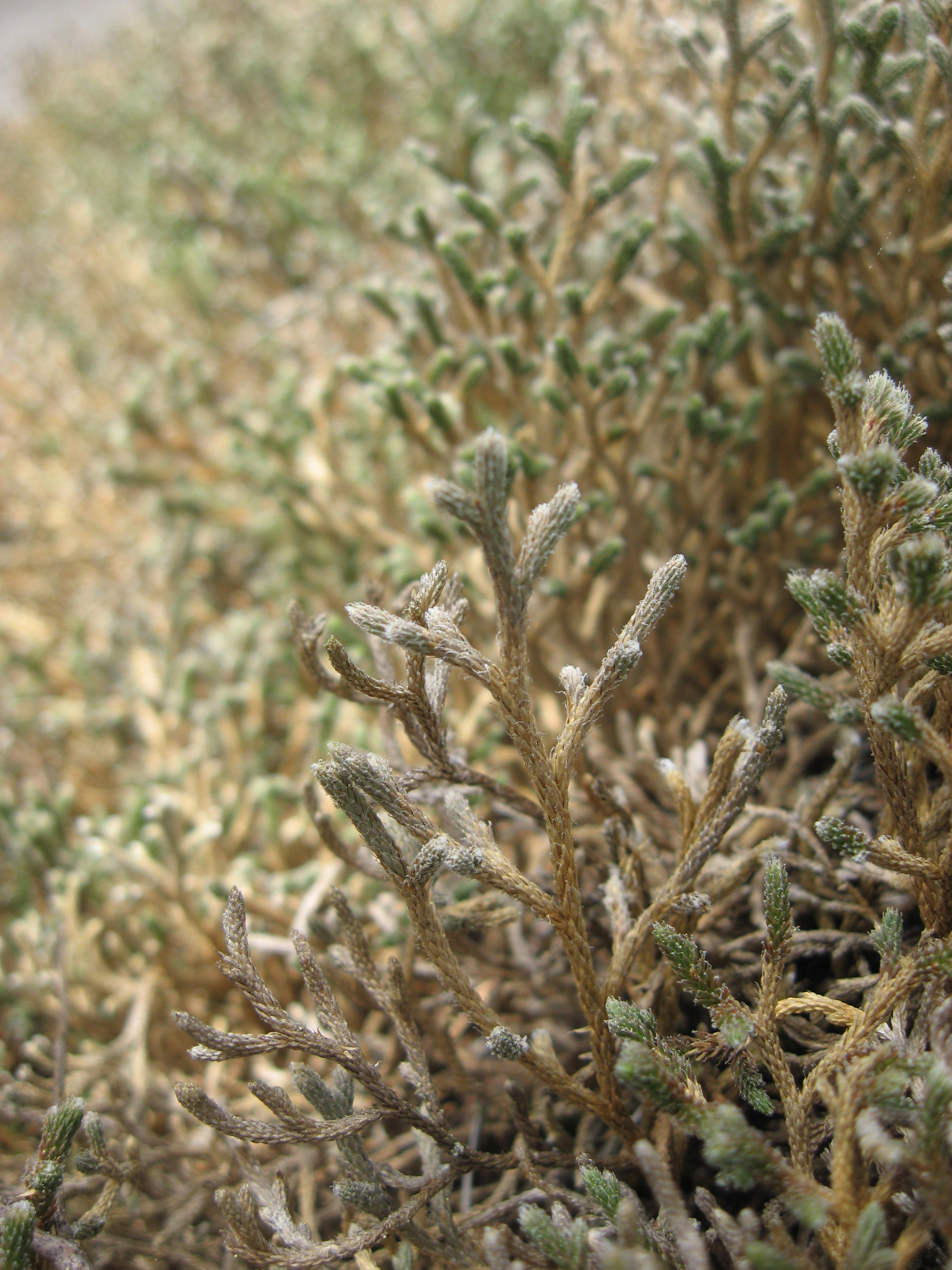

Conservation status
- Vulnerable (NatureServe)

Scientific classification
- Kingdom: Plantae
- Clade: Tracheophytes
- Clade: Lycophytes
- Class: Lycopodiopsida
- Order: Selaginellales
- Family: Selaginellaceae
- Genus: Selaginella
- Species: S. tortipila

Binomial name
- Selaginella tortipila A.Braun

Synonyms
- Bryodesma tortipilum (A.Braun) Soják; Selaginella rupestris var. sherwoodii (Underw.) Clute; Selaginella rupestris var. tortipila Underw. Selaginella sherwoodii Underw.

= Selaginella tortipila =

Species of plant

Selaginella tortipila is a species in the family Selaginellaceae commonly known as twistedhiar spikemoss. It is mainly found in southeastern United States in states like North Carolina, South Carolina, Georgia and Alabama, specifically in the region of Appalachian mountains and piedmont. S. tortipila is a small and green plant which grows on rocky outcrops and granitic surfaces. Historically, there has been a long debate over whether S. tortipila and its closely relative Selaginella sherwoodii with some scientist claiming that taxonomically they are the same species. Recently, some classified S. sherwoodii as an ecological form of S. tortipila. The naming of S. tortipila is retraced back in 1865 by A. Braun and the description of S. sherwoodii by Lucien Underwood in 1902.

== Introduction ==
In the Carolinas in the United States southeastern region, exists a mat-forming lycophyte that develops well in extreme rocky environments. Several botanists have investigated its ability to resist drought, inhabit bare rock habitats and outcompete early successions plants in extreme conditions. Past and ongoing research has classified S. tortipila among pioneer species with an amazing morphological plasticity characterized by changes in growth pattern in both moisture and light conditions.

== Habitat and distribution ==
Selaginella tortipila is mainly encountered on exposed granite and granite-gneiss rock. It colonizes very high elevations ranging from 1,500 to 4,500 ft (460 to 1,370 m). In such regions, temperature is highly variable and nutrients and water are scarce. The regions with confirmed presence of S. tortipila are:

- North Carolina.
- South Carolina.
- Georgia.

The species have been reported seen in Tennessee but remains unconfirmed. In these regions, S. tortipila grows on rocks where it leaves grayish-green masses on slopy rocky granite. It is dependent on moss mats that provide nutrient to the spores of S. tortipila for germination.

== Ecology ==
Territorial Control and Dominance

Selaginella tortipila completely dominates the communities and species on the rocky surfaces according to Steven S. Larson and Wade T. Batson; mainly in the regions of S. tortipila's abundance including Pickens and Greenville countries of South Carolina. High and relevant statistical percent frequency values and plant density have been well documented providing strong evidence of its dominance in the region. The strategy is to take possession of large areas on the surface of rock and then expand in all directions once well established on the surface of granite.

Competition

Selaginella tortipila does not grows on empty non colonized surfaces of rock. Its challenged by lack of minimum nutrients in such scenarios. In order to ensure resource provision, S. tortipila colonized preoccupied region where live pioneer succession mosses (e.g., Rhacomitrium, Andreaea) and lichen from Cladonia subspecies. Such behavior earned it the characterization of successional invader by Oosting and Lewis.

Despite its high fitness in these extreme conditions, S. tortipila does not remain in control for long. As soon as species like large Lichens like Cladonia rugiferina arrive in the habitat, they outcompete S. tortipila and share the habitat until it is completely ousted from the habitat.

Limitations and Tolerance

As many other rare species, Selaginella tortipila has many habitat limitations. Its viability and survival in region like crevices ecosystems is highly compromised and it is easily outcompeted by other taxa. This phenomenon is due to many factors including lack of influence on other species and its minimal ecological significance in its habitat.

On the other hand, S. tortipila is highly equipped and fit to survive in extreme conditions with no rainfall, low nutrients and high temperature fluctuations. Such abilities enable S. tortipila to outcompete most vascular plants.

== Morphology and life cycle ==
Growth and development

Selaginella tortipila is frequently encountered in a vegetative developing state, during which cushion like mats characteristics can be observed in its growth. Its also can completely appear morphologically different under different conditions or in different habitats. Its stems would grow erectly with several leaves in drought like conditions in exposed regions. With enough moisture and humidity (shaded region) its stems grow prostrate with widely spread leaves. Such characterized plasticity is the origin of the debate surrounding the difference between S. tortipila and S. sherwoodii relative.

Reproductive Structures

Selaginella tortipila develops reproductive structures only in favorable conditions. The latter are cone-like structures called strobili. This phase of its life is crucial for survival but also important in colonization of a new habitat. It reproduces with spores.

Spores remain the most vital part of the S. tortipila species, thus changes in spores structure could reshape morphologically and taxonomically the species. Scientists have recorded two sizes of spores in S. tortipila species. Megaspores with a diameter size between 0.25 mm and 0.41 mm have been observed in populations of straw-yellow to lemon chrome color range with rugose surfaces. Meanwhile, population of S. tortipila colored pale yellow reproduce with microspores of diameter size between 41 μm and 64 μm.

In fact, S. tortipila and S. sherwoodii share similar spore properties which poses the question of their distinction as species from one another.

== Taxonomy ==
Historically, Selaginella tortipila was named by A. Braun in 1865. Then later in 1902, Lucien Underwood discovered what seem to be a close relative of S. tortipila that he named instead S. sherwoodii as a distinct species in the genus Selaginellaceae. Underwood's classification is based on the leaf arrangement and growth behavior of both species.

The complex taxonomic debate arises here. In his review, Edgar T. Wherry combining both the similarities is spores properties, plasticity, habitat and many other factors led him to conclude that S. sherwoodii is an ecological form of S. tortipila. So, S. tortipila and S. sherwoodii are not distinct species.

== Comparison with other species ==
Selaginella tortipila is taxonomically considered distinct from its relative Selaginella rupestris. Botanists have observe differences between these two relative species in only growth form, leaf shape and habitat. Besides S. sherwoodii, the next closes relative of S. tortipila is S. rupestris. Again, the plasticity of these species render them easily confusable.

== Significance in the Selaginella genus ==
With over 700 to 800 species, the genus Selaginella is one of the oldest vascular plants groups. Within this diverse and large group, S. tortipila is known for its tolerance and incredible fitness to high elevated and extreme conditions. It is also a model organism to study succession on rocky surfaces.

Other sources

Selaginella tortipila is a species of clubmoss in the family Selaginellaceae. It is referred to by the common names twistedhair spikemoss or kinky-hair spike-moss, and is a member of an early diverging group of plants. It is native to the Southeastern United States where it is found in a small area in the Southern Appalachian Mountains and Piedmont. It is found on granite or sandstone rock outcrop communities, often at high elevation.

Selaginella tortipila is a rather distinct species of spikemoss, and likely has no close relatives in the North American flora. It has been placed in the Bryodesma group, along with Selaginella rupestris.
