= McLeans Island =

Rural area of Christchurch, New Zealand

- Interactive map of McLeans Island
- Coordinates: 43°28′S 172°28′E
- Country: New Zealand
- Region: Canterbury Region
- Territorial authority: Christchurch City
- Ward: Harewood
- Community: Waimāero Fendalton-Waimairi-Harewood
- Electorates: Ilam; Te Tai Tonga (Māori)

Government
  - Territorial Authority: Christchurch City Council
  - Regional council: Environment Canterbury
  - Mayor of Christchurch: Phil Mauger
  - Ilam MP: Hamish Campbell
  - Te Tai Tonga MP: Tākuta Ferris

Area
  - Total: 74.92 km^{2} (28.93 sq mi)

Population (June 2025)
  - Total: 200
  - Density: 2.7/km^{2} (6.9/sq mi)

McLeans Island is a rural area north and northwest of Christchurch city, and south of Waimakariri River.

The area was an island in the Waimakariri River until the 1930s, when flood control measures and Great Depression work schemes blocked the south branch of the river which separated the island from the south bank. It was named for the Scottish McLean family, who established Waimakariri Station on the south bank in the 1850s. Allan and John McLean owned the land after their brother Robertson returned to Scotland.

Part of the area is in Waimakariri River Regional Park, which contains McLeans Forest where there are walking, running and cycling tracks. Orana Wildlife Park is a zoo in the area. The McLeans Grassland Reserve, a 154-ha scenic reserve preserving one of the last remnants of pre-human Canterbury Plains vegetation, was created in 2021.

== Demographics ==
McLeans Island statistical area covers 74.92 km^{2} (28.93 sq mi). It had an estimated population of 200 as of June 2025, with a population density of 2.7 people per km^{2}.

Historical population
Year	Pop.	±% p.a.
2006	138	—
2013	234	+7.84%
2018	198	−3.29%
2023	207	+0.89%

McLeans Island had a population of 207 in the 2023 New Zealand census, an increase of 9 people (4.5%) since the 2018 census, and a decrease of 27 people (−11.5%) since the 2013 census. There were 102 males and 105 females in 72 dwellings. 4.3% of people identified as LGBTIQ+. The median age was 48.9 years (compared with 38.1 years nationally). There were 30 people (14.5%) aged under 15 years, 36 (17.4%) aged 15 to 29, 93 (44.9%) aged 30 to 64, and 48 (23.2%) aged 65 or older.

People could identify as more than one ethnicity. The results were 89.9% European (Pākehā), 5.8% Māori, 2.9% Pasifika, and 7.2% Asian. English was spoken by 94.2%, Māori by 1.4%, and other languages by 8.7%. No language could be spoken by 4.3% (e.g. too young to talk). New Zealand Sign Language was known by 1.4%. The percentage of people born overseas was 14.5, compared with 28.8% nationally.

Religious affiliations were 36.2% Christian, 1.4% Hindu, and 1.4% New Age. People who answered that they had no religion were 50.7%, and 10.1% of people did not answer the census question.

Of those at least 15 years old, 30 (16.9%) people had a bachelor's or higher degree, 90 (50.8%) had a post-high school certificate or diploma, and 57 (32.2%) people exclusively held high school qualifications. The median income was $37,600, compared with $41,500 nationally. 12 people (6.8%) earned over $100,000 compared to 12.1% nationally. The employment status of those at least 15 was 84 (47.5%) full-time, 30 (16.9%) part-time, and 6 (3.4%) unemployed.

== Biodiversity ==
In 1999 a study of the Island's invertebrate biodiversity was undertaken giving information on their abundance and threats.
