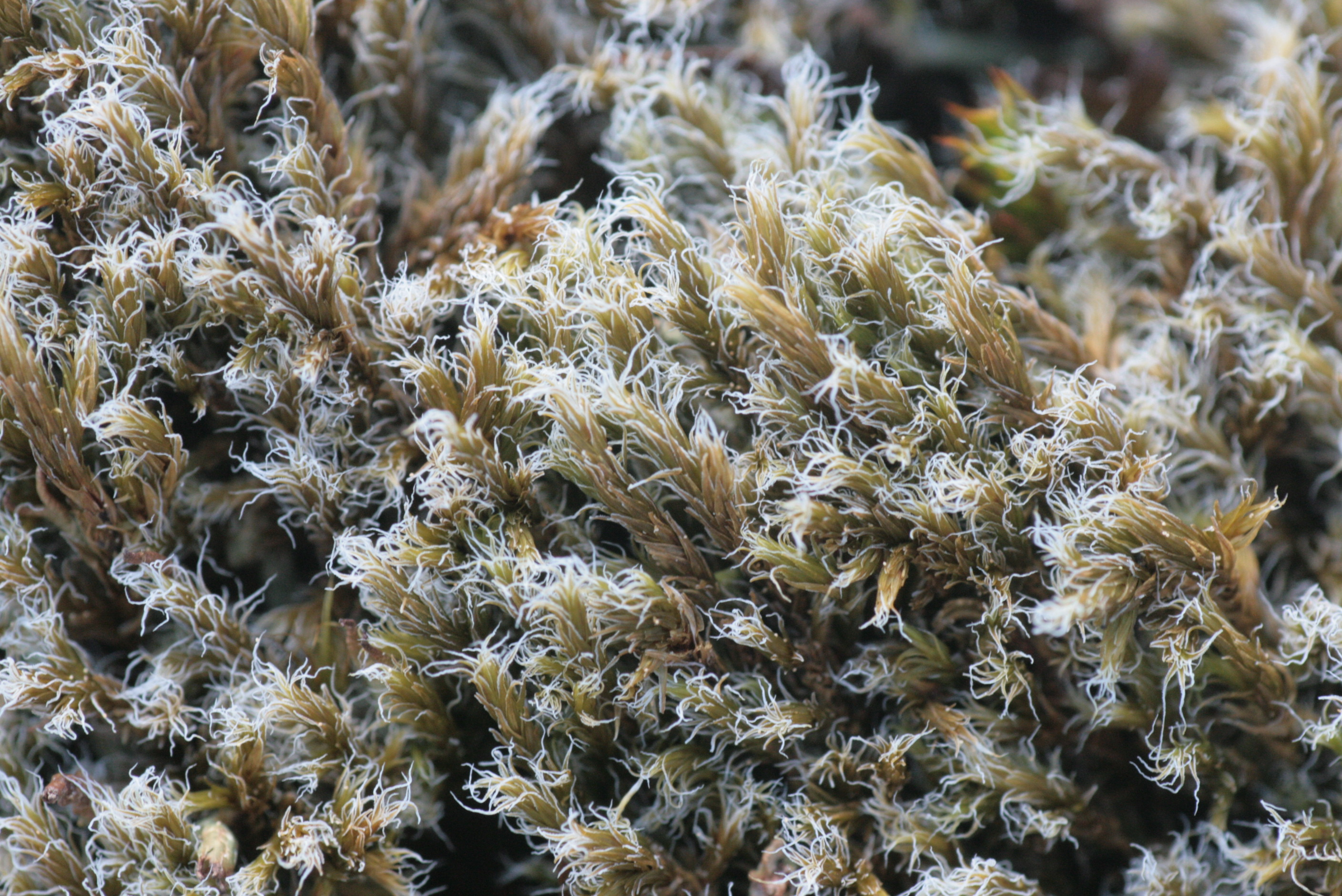

Scientific classification
- Kingdom: Plantae
- Division: Bryophyta
- Class: Bryopsida
- Subclass: Dicranidae
- Order: Grimmiales
- Family: Grimmiaceae
- Genus: Racomitrium
- Section: Racomitrium sect. Racomitrium
- Species: R. lanuginosum

Binomial name
- Racomitrium lanuginosum (Hedw.) Brid.

Synonyms
- Grimmia hypnoides Lindb.; Grimmia rigidissima Müll. Hal.; Racomitrium hypnoides Lindb.; Racomitrium lanuginosum var. pruinosum Wilson; Racomitrium lanuginosum var. subimberbe (Hartm.) Hartm.; Racomitrium leptodontioides J. B. Först.; Trichostomum hypnoides Willd. ex P. Beauv.; Trichostomum lanuginosum Hedw.

= Racomitrium lanuginosum =

Species of moss

Racomitrium lanuginosum is a widespread species of moss found in montane and arctic tundra, the genus Racomitrium is found across the Northern and Southern hemispheres., however Racomitrium lanuginosum is only found in the Northern hemisphere. It grows as large mats on exposed rock and in boulder scree, particularly on acidic rocks. Its leaves have a characteristically decurrent and toothed hair-point, which gives rise to its regional common names woolly fringemoss, hoary rock-moss and woolly moss.

== Description ==
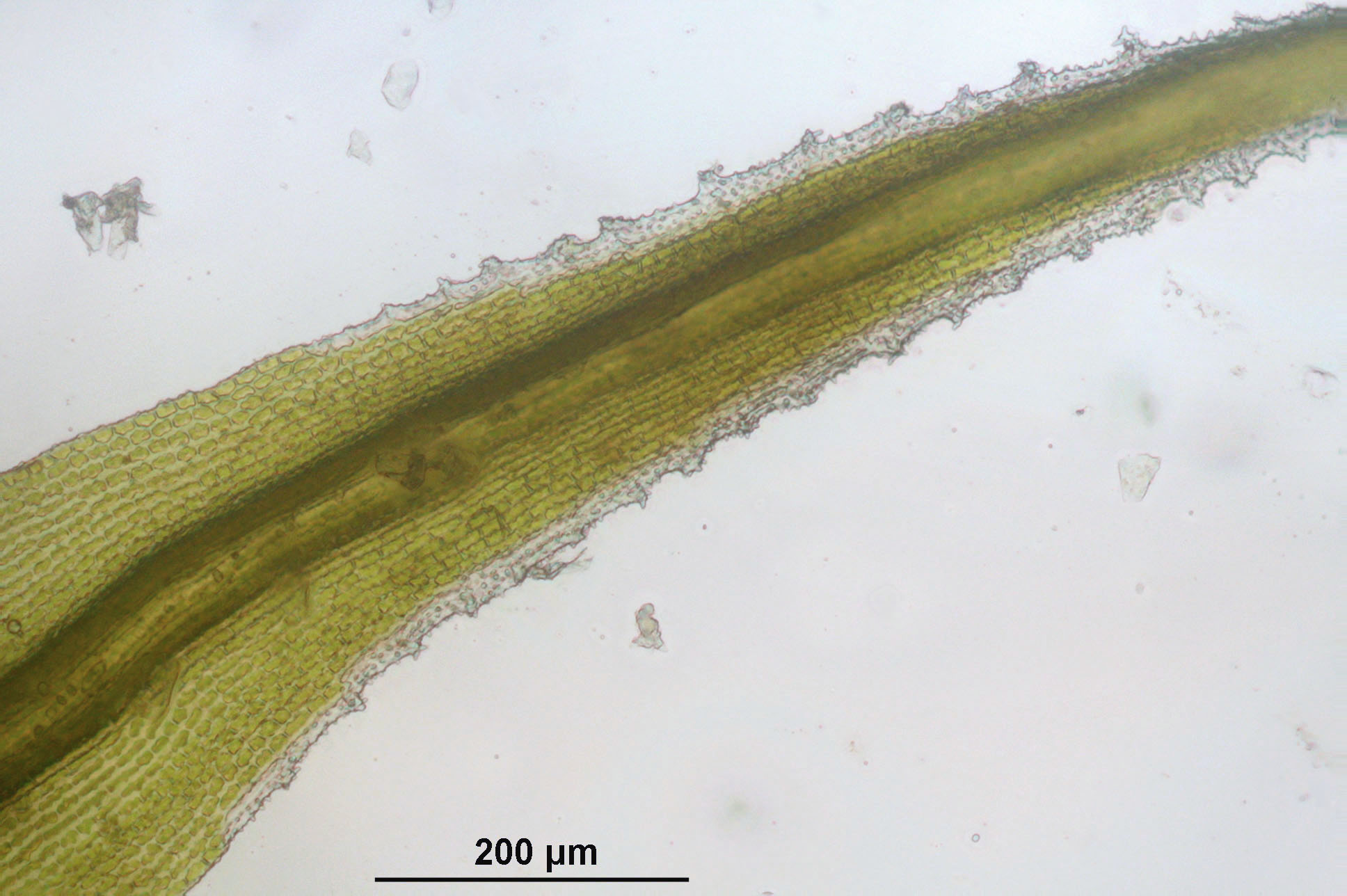
The coarsely toothed hair-points of R. lanuginosum distinguish it from many other species of Racomitrium.

Racomitrium lanuginosum grows as "large cushiony mats". Its stems are up to 12 centimetres (4.7 in) long and irregularly branched. The leaves are 3–5 millimetres (0.12–0.20 in) long, 0.6–0.9 mm (0.02–0.04 in) wide, lanceolate, pointed and with a strong midrib. They end in a long, thin hair-point, with teeth along both sides pointing 40°–90° from the axis of the leaf. The hyaline (transparent) margins of the hair-point are decurrent along the sides of the leaf. Especially when dry, these hair-points give the plant a downy appearance, which is referenced in several of the common names for the species.

Sporophytes are rarely produced, although they are reported to be abundant in coastal areas. The capsules are 1.0–1.7 mm (0.04–0.07 in) long, smooth and brown, and contain spores, which are 8–12 μm long. The form of the hair-points on the leaves of R. lanuginosum is unique among mosses.

=== Similar species ===
Racomitrium lanuginosum is "one of the few bryophytes familiar to many non-bryologists". Other species that may be confused with it include R. canescens and its close relatives, R. heterostichum and Hedwigia stellata.

== Distribution and ecology ==
Racomitrium lanuginosum grows from sea level to the alpine zone, particularly among boulder scree and on exposed rock surfaces. It will also grow in tundra or bogs. It is more frequently found on acidic rocks than calcareous ones.

Racomitrium lanuginosum has a circumpolar distribution in the Northern Hemisphere, and is found disjunctly in the mountains of the tropics and the Southern Hemisphere.

Within North America, R. lanuginosum is found widely across northern Canada, and extends further south both in the east (to Maine), and in the west (to California and the Rocky Mountains). It is also found in Costa Rica and in mountainous regions of South America and South Africa.

In the Atlantic Ocean, isolated populations occur in Iceland, the Azores, the Canary Islands, Madeira, Tristan da Cunha and South Georgia; it also occurs on Réunion in the Indian Ocean, in New Zealand, Hawaii and the sub-Antarctic islands Deception Island, Kerguelen, Îles Crozet, Heard Island and the Prince Edward Islands.

As well as occurring widely across Arctic Asia, R. lanuginosum is also found in some temperate and tropical mountains on Borneo, Java, Sumatra and New Guinea. In Australia, R. lanuginosum is restricted to Tasmania and the highest ground of the Great Dividing Range on the border of New South Wales and Victoria.

== Taxonomy ==
Racomitrium lanuginosum was first described by Johann Hedwig in 1801 as Trichostomum lanuginosum. It was moved to its current genus in 1818 when Samuel Elisée Bridel-Brideri established the genus Racomitrium, and that position was cemented in 1860 when Wilhelm Philippe Schimper designated R. lanuginosum as the type species of Racomitrium. Racomitrium lanuginosum is classified in Racomitrium sect. Racomitrium, a group that also contains the species R. geronticum and R. pruinosum.

Racomitrium lanuginosum is known by a variety of vernacular names around the world. In the British Isles, it is known as the "woolly fringe-moss", in Canada as the "hoary rock-moss", and in New Zealand as "woolly moss".
