= Waitaki District Council building =

Historic building in Oamaru, New Zealand (previously the Oamaru Post Office)

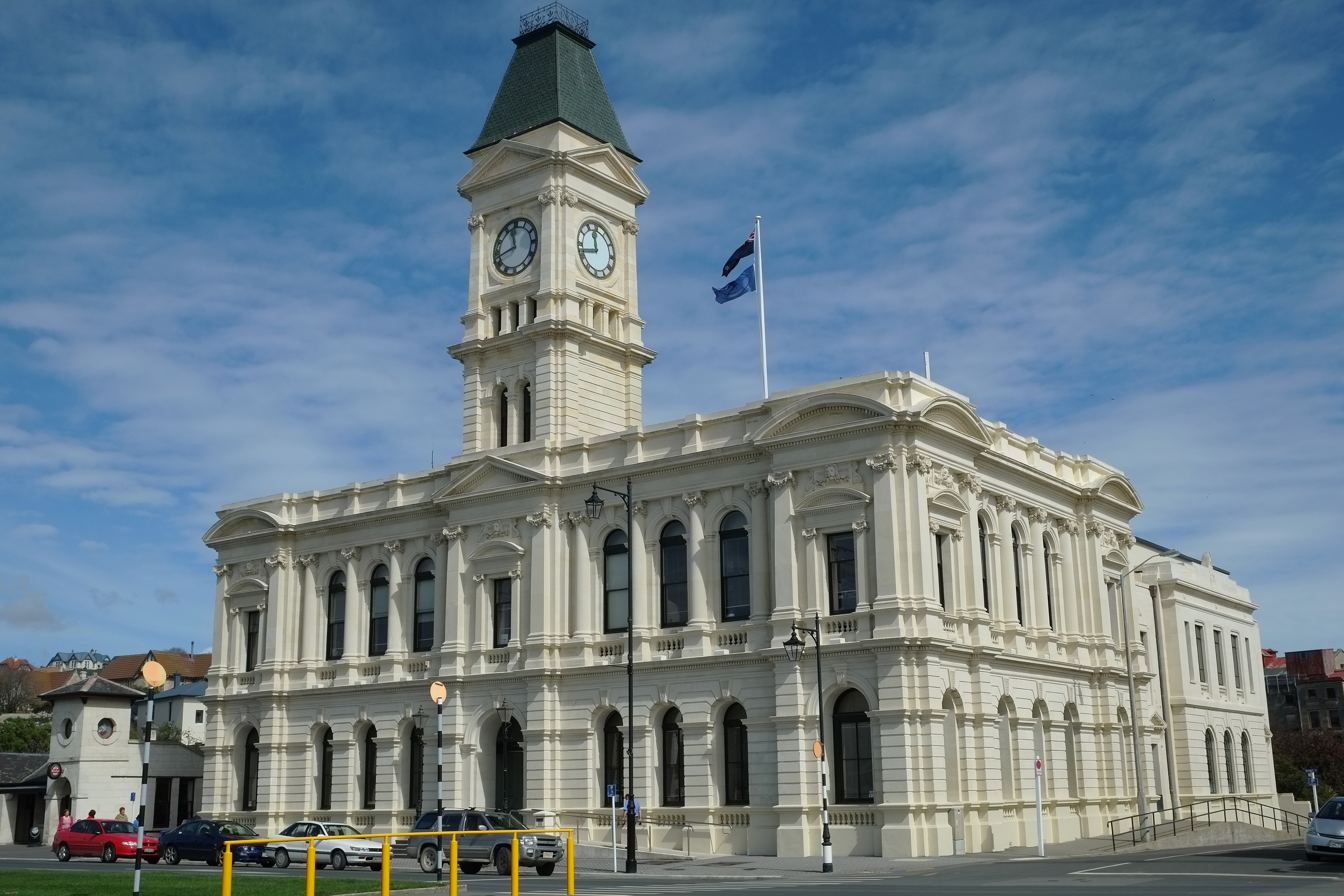
- The building in 2013
- Interactive map of the Waitaki District Council building area
- Former names: Oamaru Chief Post Office

General information
- Location: 20 Thames Street; Oamaru; New Zealand
- Coordinates: 45.1009°S 170.9689°E
- Construction started: 1883
- Completed: 1884

Design and construction
- Architect: Thomas Forrester

Heritage New Zealand – Category 1
- Designated: 28 June 1990
- Reference no.: 2294

The Waitaki District Council building, the former Oamaru Chief Post Office, is the seat of the Waitaki District in Oamaru, New Zealand.

Oamaru's first post office was built in 1864 to a design by William Mason and William Clayton. The town was prosperous and soon, the building was too small. The government advanced NZ£4,000 and tenders were called in February 1883 for a new building next to the first post office. The North Otago Times described the design plans with the following words:

It is designed in the Italian order of architecture, in a massive and handsome style; there being no redundancy of intricate ornamental workmanship about the facings. ... The base of the building will be of blue stone; the rest, of course, of Oamaru stone. The exterior of the building as it appears on the plans will be decidedly handsome; having a height to the top of the parapet of 45 feet, and from the above description it will be seen that the accommodation provided for the public will be a decided improvement upon the existing state of things.

The building was opened in 1884, but much to the population's disappointment, the clock tower was not erected initially. As it was large and richly ornamented, it soon was a favourite motive for post cards, calendars, and crockery. Ten years later, the tower was added, but the Post and Telegraph Department insisted that the clock and chimes be funded by the Oamaru Borough. John McLean, a rich runholder and businessman who had lived in Oamaru for the last few decades of his life and who died in 1902, left money in his will for the clock. As McLean had never married, it was up to his nephew, John Buckley, a son of George Buckley, to unveil the additions on 17 September 1903.

In the mid-1940s, many post offices had their heavy clocks removed, as they posed an earthquake risk. Whilst lobbying against this measure was often unsuccessful, the clock in the Oamaru post office was allowed to remain. The building was registered by the New Zealand Historic Places Trust (now called Heritage New Zealand) on 28 June 1990 with registration number 2294. The building has a category I listing. The post office moved out in 1994, and the Waitaki District Council has used the premises since.
