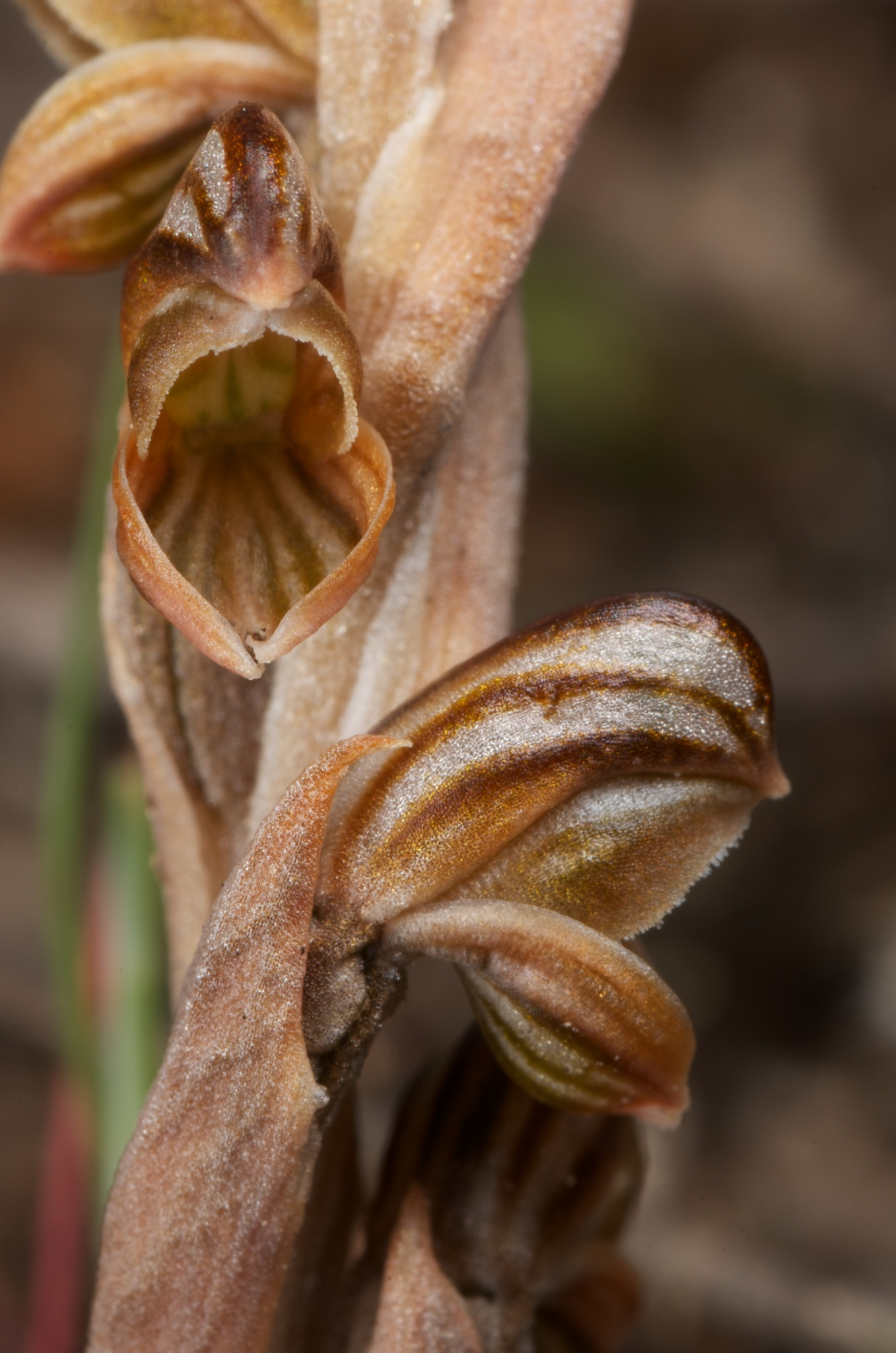
- Pterostylis tristis near Medbury

Scientific classification
- Kingdom: Plantae
- Clade: Embryophytes
- Clade: Tracheophytes
- Clade: Spermatophytes
- Clade: Angiosperms
- Clade: Monocots
- Order: Asparagales
- Family: Orchidaceae
- Subfamily: Orchidoideae
- Tribe: Cranichideae
- Genus: Pterostylis
- Species: P. tristis

Binomial name
- Pterostylis tristis Colenso

Synonyms
- Hymenochilus tristis (Colenso) D.L.Jones, M.A.Clem. & Molloy

= Pterostylis tristis =

Midget greenhood

Species of orchid

Pterostylis tristis, commonly known as the midget greenhood, is a species of greenhood orchid endemic to New Zealand. Both flowering and non-flowering plants have a rosette of fleshy leaves lying flat on the ground and flowering plants have up to eight yellowish-green or brownish flowers with pale stripes.

== Description ==
Pterostylis tristis is a terrestrial, perennial, deciduous, herb with an underground tuber. Non-flowering plants have a stalked rosette of between five and seven brownish or yellowish-green leaves which are 5–15 mm (0.2–0.6 in) long and 3–10 mm (0.1–0.4 in) wide. Up to eight yellowish-green or brownish striped flowers are borne on a fleshy flowering stem 20–100 mm (0.8–4 in) high with many stem leaves similar to the rosette leaves but smaller. The rosette leaves are usually withered by flowering time. The dorsal sepal and petals are fused, forming a hood or "galea" over the column. The galea is 5–10 mm (0.2–0.4 in) long and wide with the dorsal sepal slightly longer than the petals. The lateral sepals are downturned and joined together for most of their length, each with a short point on its end. The labellum is short, broad and blunt with a smooth lobe on the upper end. Flowering occurs from September to January.

== Taxonomy and naming ==
Pterostylis tristis was first formally described in 1886 by William Colenso from a specimen collected on the south bank of the Waipawa River. The description was published in Transactions and Proceedings of the New Zealand Institute. The specific epithet (tristis) is a Latin word meaning "sad". (Colenso described the type specimen as "very small, rather dingy-looking".)

== Distribution and habitat ==
The midget greenhood usually grows in open tussock grassland. It occurs on the South Island east of the main ranges south from the Canterbury region. There are a few old records from the North Island and Stewart Island.
