= George Buckley (New Zealand politician) =

New Zealand runholder and politician (1830–1895)

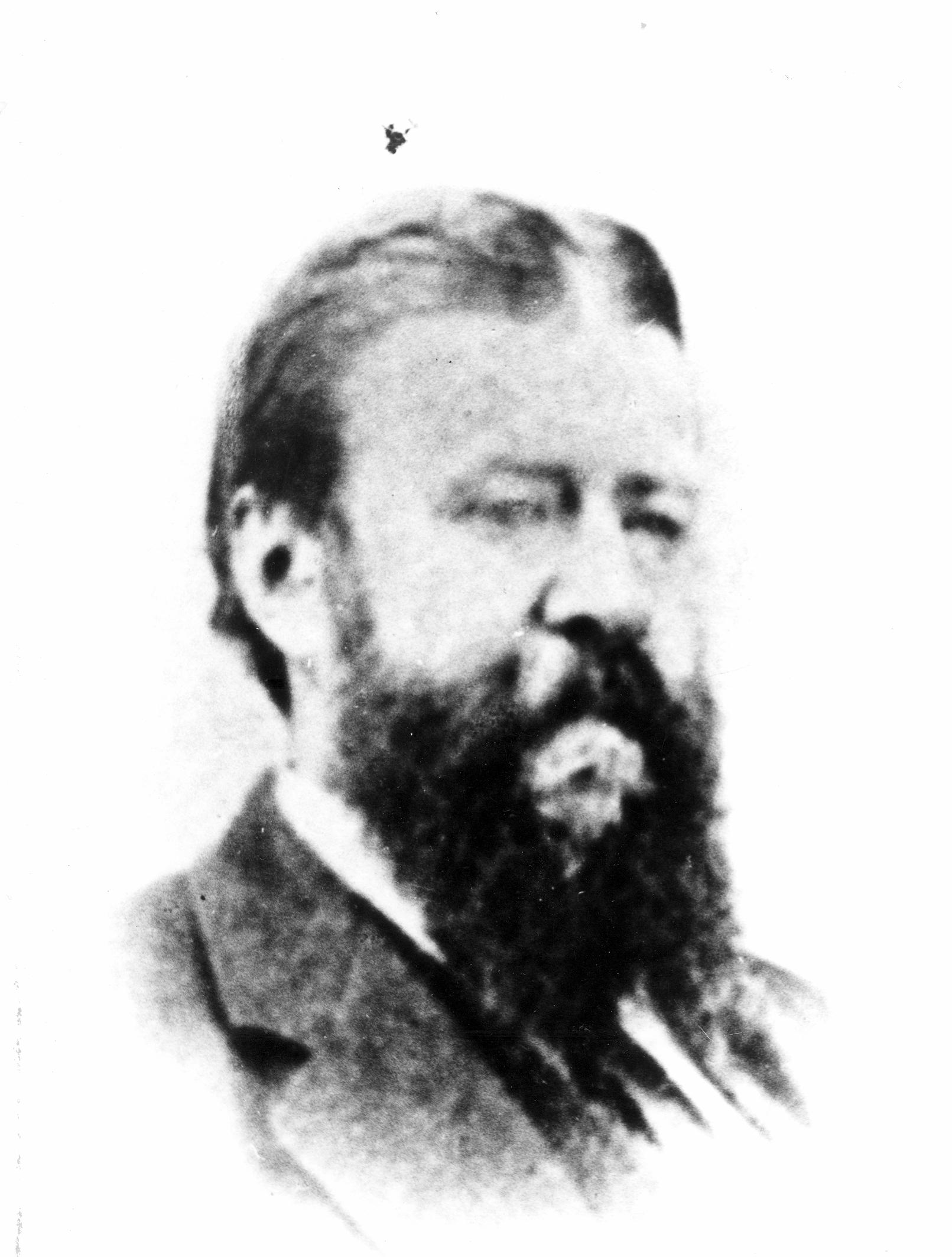
The Hon George Buckley

George Buckley (18 July 1830 – 19 November 1895) was a New Zealand runholder and politician.

Buckley was born on 18 July 1830 in Chatham, Kent, England. His parents were William Henry Buckley and Elizabeth (née Clark. His grandfather was a captain killed in the Battle of Waterloo. The family emigrated to Australia in 1840. George Buckley was at first a clerk in the Melbourne treasury office, and then a draughtsman in the city's survey department. Together with his brother John, he then joined Dalgety & Co.

Buckley married Alexandrina McLean on 25 February 1860; she was the sister of John and Allan McLean.

He was a partner in the Lyttelton firm Dalgety, Buckley, and Co. John and Allan McLean bought the Waikakahi run near Waimate in 1866, and they took Buckley into their business partnership. Buckley sold his shares to the McLean brothers in 1875.

Buckley was a member of the Canterbury Provincial Council. He represented the Town of Lyttelton electorate (1862–1866) and then the Waimate electorate until the abolition of provincial government (1866–1876). He was a member of the Executive Council for three periods: in November 1866, from August to October 1871, and from April 1875 to June 1876. He held the offices of Deputy-Superintendent and Provincial Secretary. He stood in the 1866 election in the Heathcote electorate, but was defeated by John Hall (who was later to become the 12th Premier).

He was a member of the New Zealand Legislative Council from 3 July 1871 to 19 August 1884 when he was disqualified for absence; and 28 October 1884 to 9 September 1885 when he resigned.

Buckley was the president of the Bank of New Zealand for a short time in the late 1880s. His revelations about the financial situation of the bank caused "a good deal of sensation". He left for Melbourne after his resignation from the bank, and he died in the Melbourne suburb of Brighton on 19 November 1895 after having been unwell for some time. He was survived by his wife, three daughters, and three sons, is buried in the Brighton Cemetery. His wife died in 1902 aged 70. His son George became notable through an Antarctic journey. His youngest daughter, Ruby, married Arthur Rolleston in 1899.

Buckleys Road in the Christchurch suburb of Linwood is named after him.
