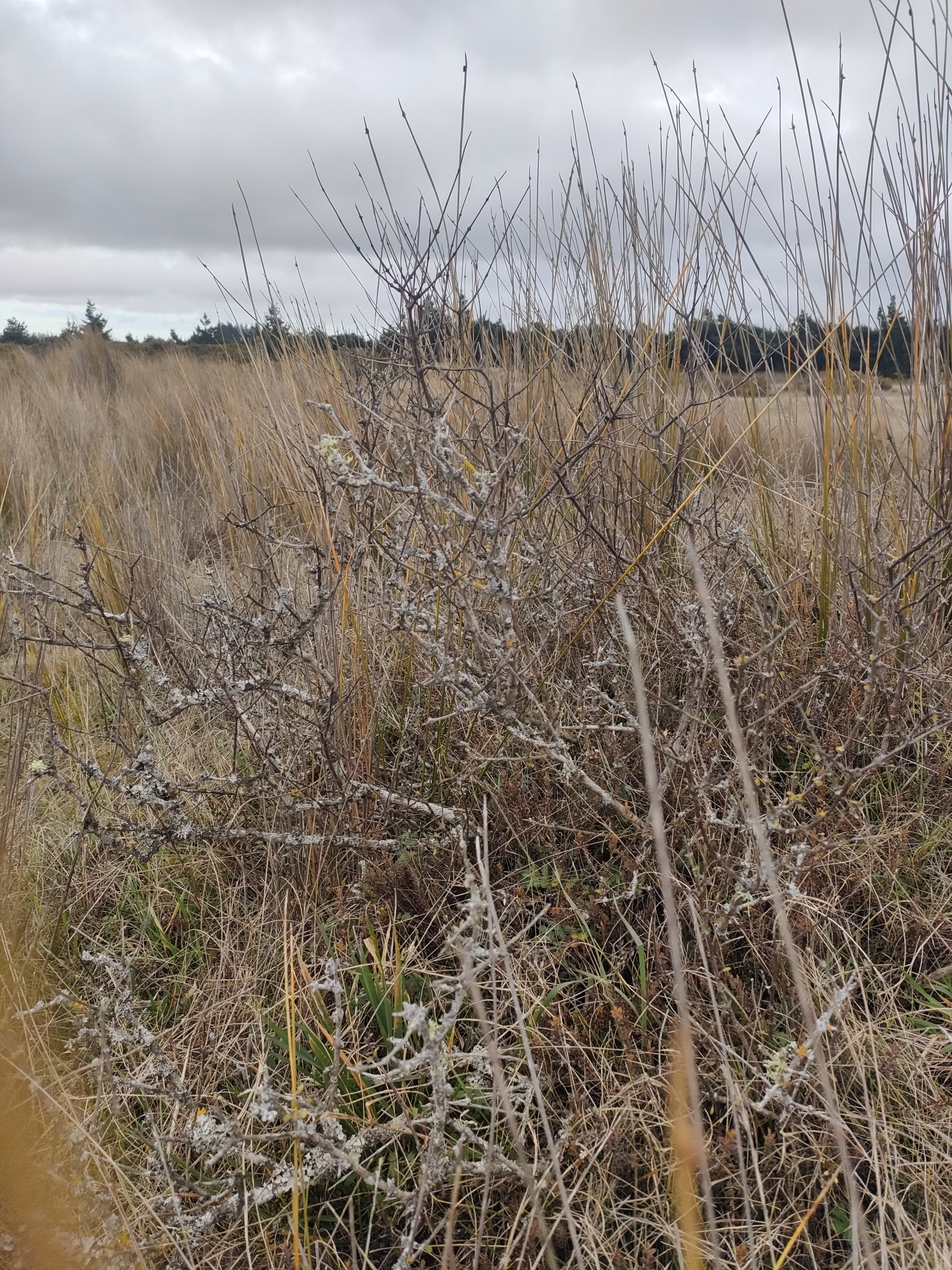

Scientific classification
- Kingdom: Plantae
- Clade: Tracheophytes
- Clade: Angiosperms
- Clade: Eudicots
- Clade: Asterids
- Order: Asterales
- Family: Asteraceae
- Genus: Olearia
- Species: O. adenocarpa

Binomial name
- Olearia adenocarpa Molloy & Heenan

Synonyms
- Shawia adenocarpa (Heenan et Molloy) Saldivia & Nicol

= Olearia adenocarpa =

Species of shrub

Olearia adenocarpa, Canterbury Plains tree daisy or small-leaved tree daisy, is a small divaricating shrub endemic to New Zealand, from the plant family Asteraceae. The bush grows up to 1.5 m (5 ft) in height and 1.2 m wide. It has a smaller and open growth habit in comparison to Olearia odorata. It is trailing deciduous to semi-deciduous.

== Description ==
New branches form at or below ground level on a regular basis to compensate for the short-lived main branches, which generally only live up to 12 years. Branches range in size up to 30 mm (1.2 in) diameter. They spread to: decumbent branches that run along the ground and surface with their ends curved upwards, upright branches that are essentially vertical, or rhizomatous roots and shoots from nodes on the stem of the plant.

Olearia adenocarpa has opposite egg-shaped leaves, ranging in size from 3 to 14 mm (0.12 to 0.55 in) in length and 2 to 4 mm wide. The upper side ranges in tone from light green to a dark browny-green or grey-green with a hairy silvery-white underside Clusters of flowers begin to bloom in January; These are usually pale white in colour with a yellow/green centre. At this point it releases its pollen from small anthers that dehisce. The dry seeds are covered with hairs. This trait is significant in distinguishing it from other species.

== Distribution ==
Olearia adenocarpa is endemic to the Canterbury Plains in the South Island of New Zealand, with only two known sub-populations at two different sites: the lower Rakaia River known as the Great Island and part of the Waimakariri River floodplain between Harwood and West Melton. A fully fenced and monitored conservation site within one of these sub-populations has been set up essentially to enhance and preserve Olearia adenocarpa, hoping to avoid rapid extinction.

=== Habitat preferences ===
Olearia adenocarpa generally grow in degraded to unimproved dry grassland along the dry stony terraces and channels that border a braided riverbed, in recently deposited, alluvial deposited gravels and sands that are drought-prone but fertile with high levels of readily available phosphorus. Alluvial essentially means the surface materials (gravel and sand) deposited where water has previously flowed or has been flooded. Olearia adenocarpa are generally scattered individuals and are rarely seen in abundance.

== Life cycle and phenology ==
Olearia adenocarpa has very little known about its general life cycle due to its low-occurring numbers of individual plants. At 6 months old Olearia adenocarpa main stem becomes decumbent. By one year old there are two or three decumbent main branches and few shorter upright branches. At two years old Olearia adenocarpa have more than 12 decumbent branches at 3–12 cm long, with many other shoots arising. By the age of three years plus, Olearia adenocarpa is considered mature, having at this stage more than 18 slender branches, however these branches are short lived based on the measurement of the annual growth rings of the plant that live no more than 20 years. Many old branches are scattered around the base of the plant in various states of decay.

The growth depends upon the extent of animal grazing. Moderately grazed plants produce new shoots regularly. However, severely grazed plants produce very few new shoots. Therefore, as older branches die, they are not replaced. Gradually the plant dies from grazing by hares, rabbits, sheep, or other animals.

The phenology of the Olearia adenocarpa is also little known due to the recent discovery of this species and the lack of individuals. From mid-December, flower buds begin to appear on the plant at about a 0.1 cm length, by late December this has increased to 0.2 cm. By mid-January the buds have elongated to a length of 0.4 cm. Flowering occurs around the end of January as the first florets open and the anthers dehisce. These flowers commonly appear in clusters.

Anther- part of a stamen that contains pollen.

Dehisced- stamen/pod/seed gape or burst open setting the pollen free. The flowering of the Olearia adenocarpa is completed by the end of February as pollen is all dispersed and the dry seeds are covered with fine hairs that characterize them from other species. It is suspected that seed dispersal happens with the flood waters of the river washing them downstream, however the hairs signify that it may be seed dispersal through a carrier such as sheep or rabbit.

== Diet and foraging ==
Olearia adenocarpa does not have any nitrogen fixing nodules on its roots, therefore lives in soils of low nitrogen. Instead it thrives off phosphorus in the soils. The soils this plant is found in are relatively fertile due to the pH being at a fairly neutral level. However located on dried braided river bed the Olearia adenocarpa the environmental conditions for this plant are extreme, ranging from drought like conditions harsh sun and lack of water to flooding in the river totally covering the plant. It however has adapted to these conditions as can be seen in the low to the ground growth of this plant.

== Predators, parasites, and diseases ==
The Waimakariri River is the main location where Olearia adenocarpa occurs, however up to 95% of these plants are predated upon. The main predators for this plant are hare, rabbits, and sheep. This predation has greatly affected the growth patterns of the Olearia adenocarpa, with plants that are grazed on having older branches that are far more slender and short than those that have not been grazed on. This plant species is rare, and with such a small population, heavily grazed on plants are unable to reproduce or flourish. Researchers believe that only ungrazed Olearia adenocarpa have the ability to reproduce.

== Other information ==
With a maximum of 650 individual plants remaining, Olearia adenocarpa had been mis-identified as Olearia odorata or Olearia virgata. However, with the development, new discoveries and advances in systematics, fueled by molecular technology have added species to lists of threatened species Olearia adenocarpa was described and named in 2004. As a result, this suggests natural hybridism may have taken place as it is frequent within the genus Olearia in New Zealand.

Future population expansion is unlikely as Olearia adenocarpa essentially relies on natural disturbance in particular erosion or flooding for the colonization of fresh surface through seed dispersal from the surviving population. With the increase and development of infrastructure for protection and maintenance of roading and water networks, such events are being prevented limiting the opportunities for further establishment.
