= Wade Watson =

Australian priest (1837–1915)

George Wade Watson (1837–1915) was an Anglican priest in the second half of the 19th century and the first two decades of the 20th century.

Watson was educated at Moore College. He was ordained deacon in 1864, and priest in 1865. He served at Mansfield, Eaglehawk, Ballarat, Sale, Victoria and Footscray. In 1902 he became archdeacon of Bendigo.

== See also ==
- Moore Theological College
