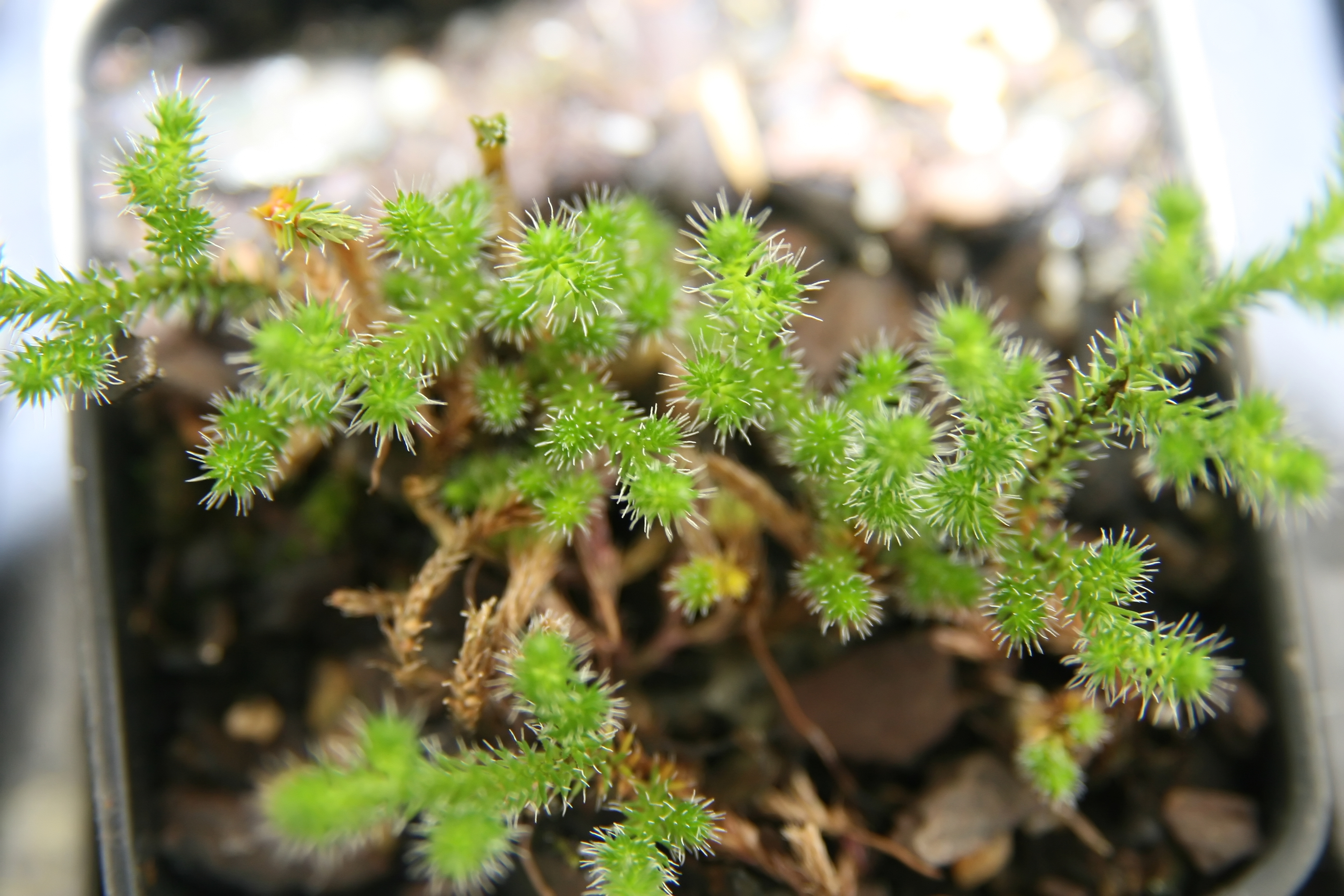
- Selaginella rupestris

Conservation status
- Secure (NatureServe)

Scientific classification
- Kingdom: Plantae
- Clade: Embryophytes
- Clade: Tracheophytes
- Clade: Lycophytes
- Class: Lycopodiopsida
- Order: Selaginellales
- Family: Selaginellaceae
- Genus: Selaginella
- Species: S. rupestris

Binomial name
- Selaginella rupestris (L.) Spring

= Selaginella rupestris =

Species of spore-bearing plant

Selaginella rupestris, the northern selaginella sometimes locally known as ledge spike-moss or rock spike-moss, is a species of spike-moss occurring in dry rocky places in eastern North America, including one locality in Greenland. It has a wide but sporadic range. In the absence of water, it rolls into a ball for which, it is also known as bird nest moss. Again, when it comes in contact with water, it opens up.

It is listed as imperiled and threatened in the State of Indiana.
