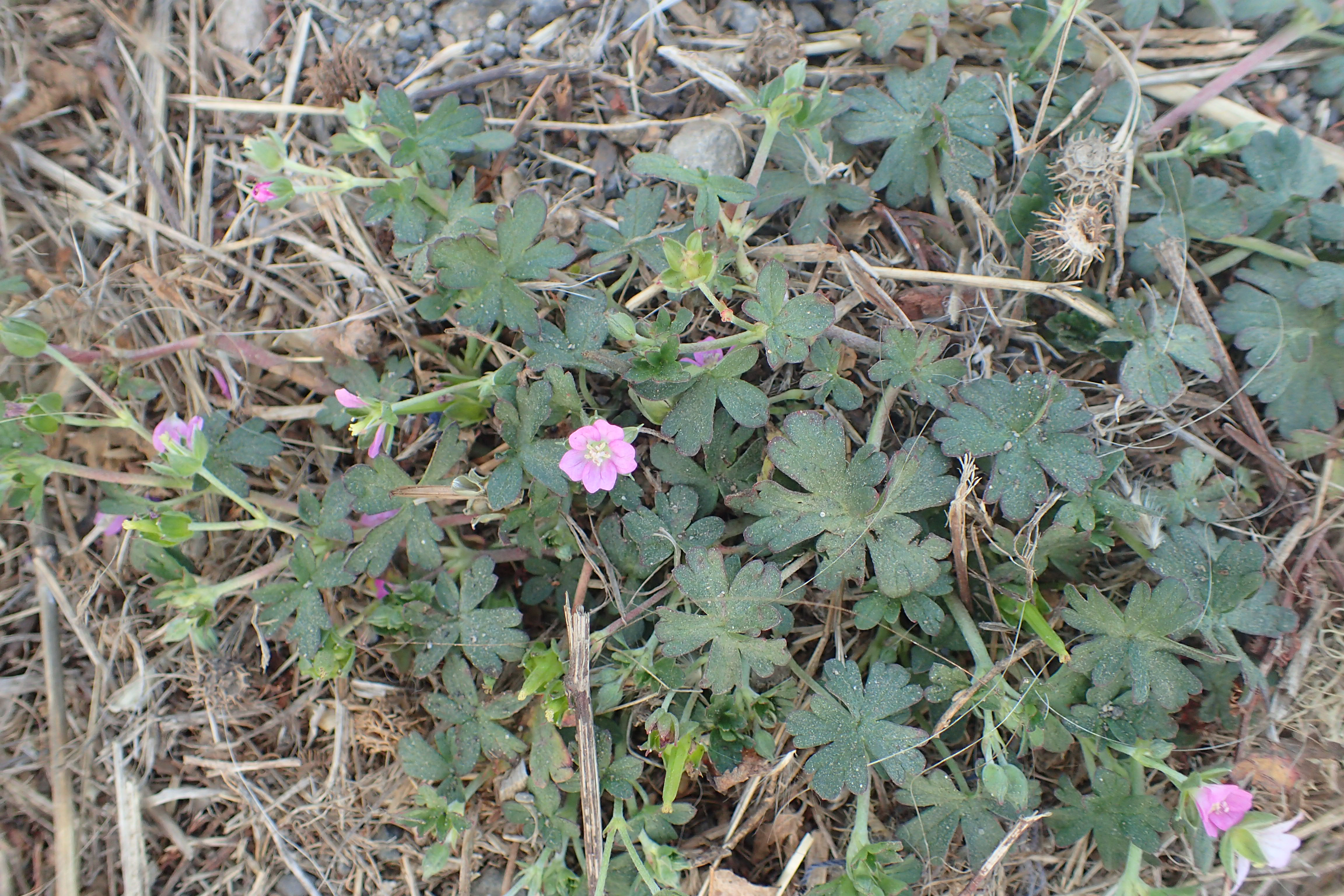

Scientific classification
- Kingdom: Plantae
- Clade: Tracheophytes
- Clade: Angiosperms
- Clade: Eudicots
- Clade: Rosids
- Order: Geraniales
- Family: Geraniaceae
- Genus: Geranium
- Species: G. retrorsum

Binomial name
- Geranium retrorsum L'Hér. ex DC.

= Geranium retrorsum =

Species of plant

Geranium retrorsum is a species of Geranium known by the common name New Zealand geranium in the United States and common cranesbill in Australia. It is native to Australia and New Zealand but can be found on other continents as an introduced species which is often a noxious weed as well. This is a perennial herb growing generally erect to a maximum height approaching half a meter. The stems are green to reddish and have stiff hairs. The leaves are a few centimeters wide and divided into several segments which are further divided into small lobes. The small flowers are fuchsia to purple in color. The fruit has a straight style about a centimeter in length.

In New Zealand this species has been classified by the Department of Conservation as Threatened - Nationally Vulnerable.
