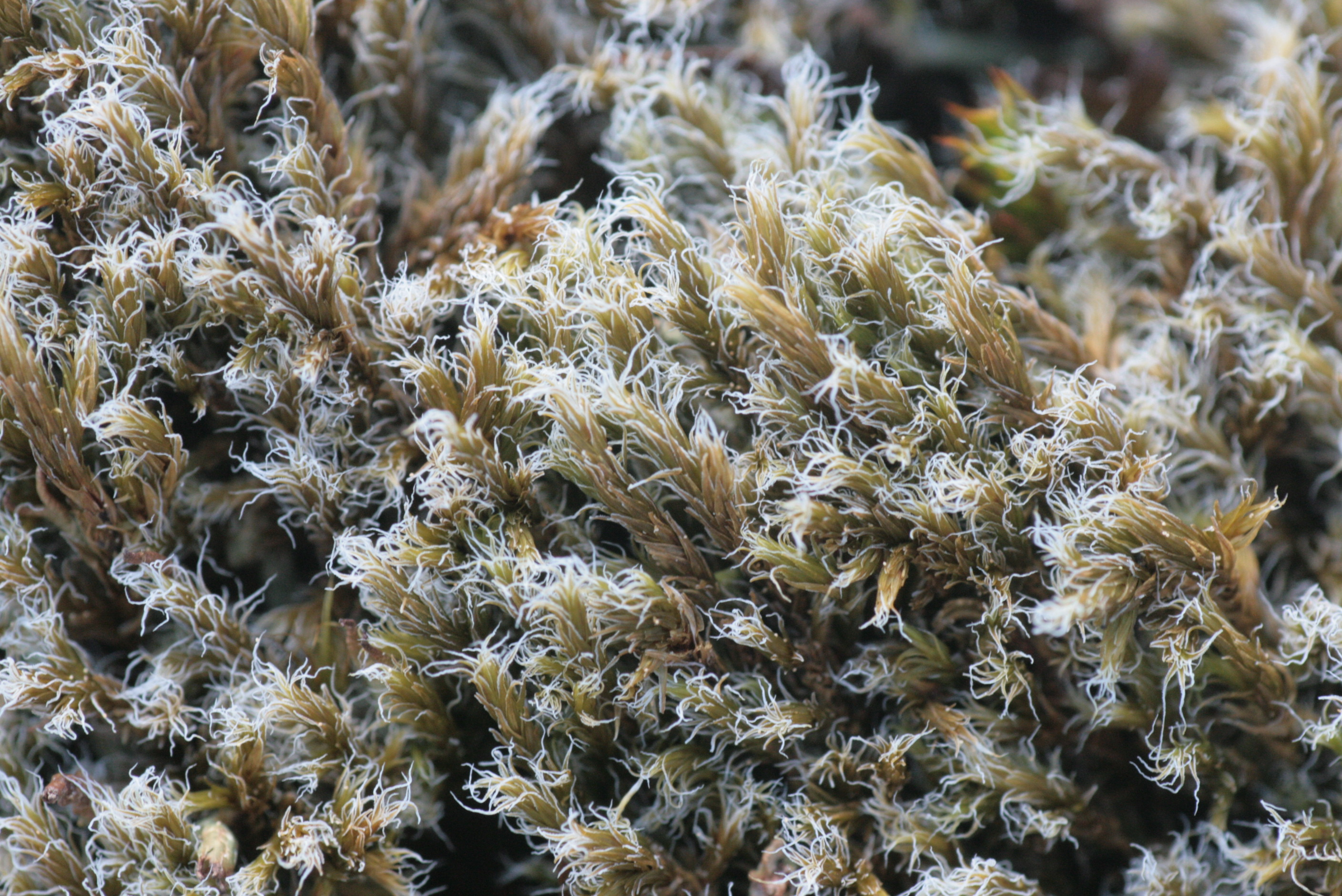
- Racomitrium lanuginosum

Scientific classification
- Kingdom: Plantae
- Division: Bryophyta
- Class: Bryopsida
- Subclass: Dicranidae
- Order: Grimmiales
- Family: Grimmiaceae
- Genus: Racomitrium; Brid.

= Racomitrium =

Genus of mosses

Racomitrium is a genus of mosses in the family Grimmiaceae established in 1818 by Samuel Elisée Bridel-Brideri. It contains the following species:

- Racomitrium geronticum Müll.Hal.
- Racomitrium lanuginosum (Hedw.) Brid.
- Racomitrium patagonicum Bedn.-Ochyra & Ochyra
- Racomitrium pruinosum (Wilson) Müll.Hal.
- Racomitrium pseudopatens (Müll.Hal.) Paris
