= John McLean (New Zealand politician) =

New Zealand runholder and politician (1818–1902)

The Honourable John McLean
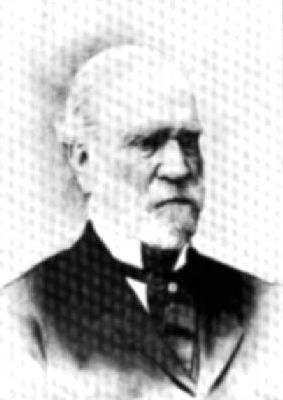

Member of the New Zealand Legislative Council
- In office 10 April 1867 – 21 August 1872

Personal details
- Born: 1818 Coll, Argyll, Scotland
- Died: 15 July 1902 (aged 83–84) Oamaru, New Zealand
- Relations: Allan McLean (brother); George Buckley (brother-in-law)
- Occupation: Runholder

John McLean (1818 – 15 July 1902) was a runholder, first in Australia and then in New Zealand. From a poor background in Scotland, he and his brother Allan had the largest number of sheep in New Zealand. John McLean was also a politician, and he served on the Otago Provincial Council and the New Zealand Legislative Council.

== Early life ==
McLean was born on Coll in 1818, one of the islands of the Inner Hebrides of Scotland. His father, Alexander McLean, was a farmer and fisherman who lived on Lagmor, where he drowned in 1836. Initially, the family was sustained by the large tracts of land they owned on the islands of Tiree and Mull as well as on the mainland at Mowern and Ardnamurchan. But over the years, they needed additional resources to make a livelihood and resorted to fisheries. After his father's death, his mother, Mary, could not make a living with the lands left to her and they were in a penurious state. Mary took the five surviving of her eight children to Australia after widespread crop failure; they left Tobermory, Mull on the George Fyfe on 15 September 1839 and arrived in Sydney on 23 January 1840. John McLean and his brothers Allan and Robertson (Robert) made a living as working class shepherds, and became established enough so that they could buy two sheep runs in west Victoria, which they owned from 1848 to 1851. They capitalised on the Victorian gold rush by supplying the goldfields region, becoming runholders.

== Life in New Zealand ==
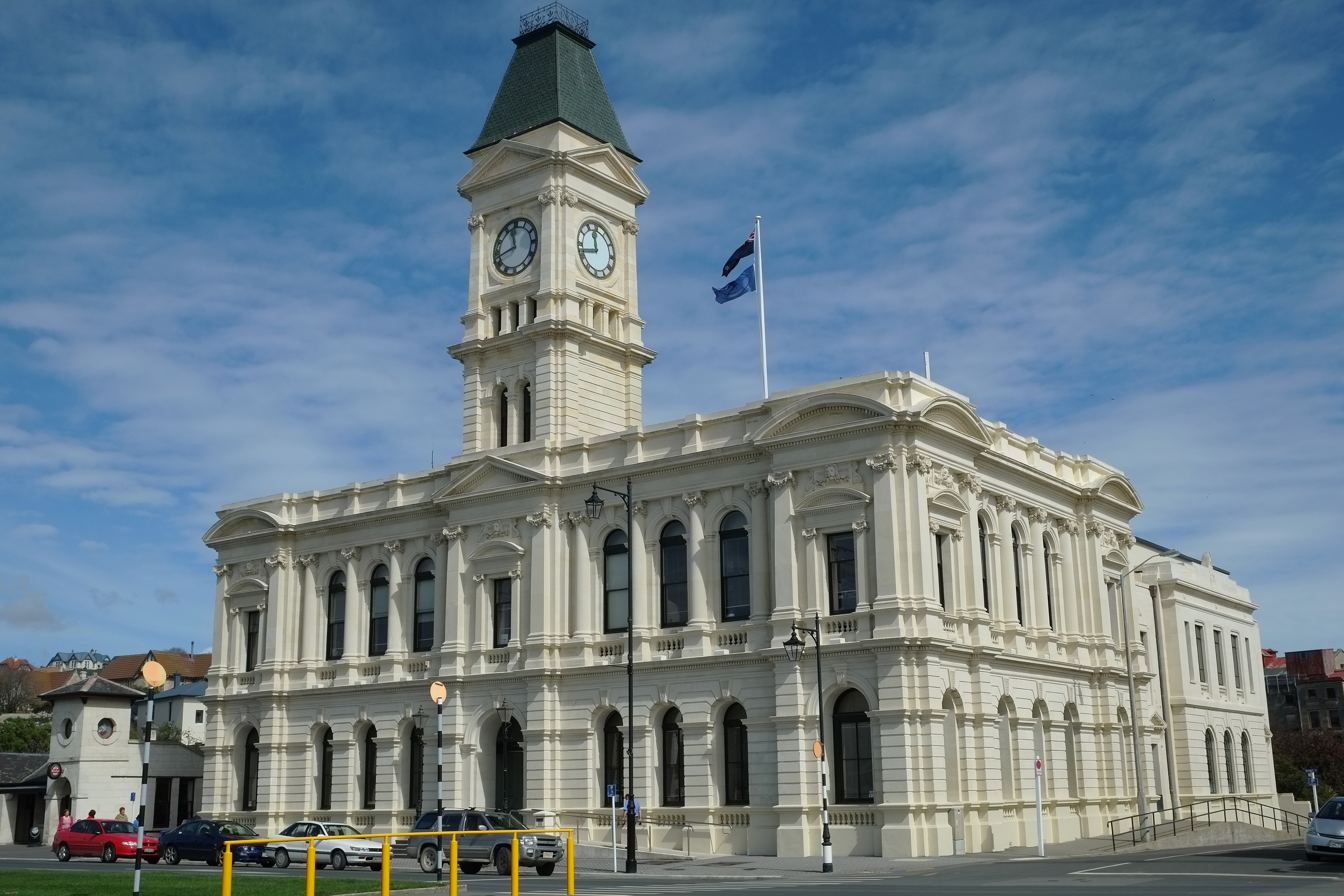
A bequest by McLean paid for the clock and chimes in the Oamaru Chief Post Office

In 1852, the brothers purchased the Ashfield run adjacent to the Waimakariri River in Canterbury, New Zealand, and the family moved to that country. Robertson returned to Scotland, where he died in 1871, but Allan and John owned runs in Canterbury, Otago, and Morven Hills, acquiring the Waikakahi property near Waimate from a Mr. Harris in 1866. Their sister Alexandrina (known to the family as Lexie) had married George Buckley in 1860, and Buckley became a shareholder in the Waikakahi run, but sold out to the brothers in 1875. In 1880, Allan and John's partnership ended.

John and Allan McLean were New Zealand's largest owners of sheep by numbers. John McLean eventually settled in Oamaru, North Otago.

McLean represented the Oamaru Town electorate on the Otago Provincial Council from 6 March 1871 until the abolition of the provincial government system on 31 October 1876. He was member of the New Zealand Legislative Council from 10 April 1867 to 21 August 1872, when he resigned.

He died at Redcastle, a suburb of Oamaru, on 15 July 1902, having never married. His Redcastle land later became St Kevin's College. A family grave had been established at Christchurch's Addington Cemetery; his mother had been interred in 1871 and his sister Mary in 1875. McLean was apparently fond of his sister and wanted to be buried next to her, and his body was brought by train to Christchurch. His sister Alexandrina died a fortnight after him and was also buried in the family grave.

In his will, McLean left funds for a clock and chimes to be added to the clock tower of the Oamaru Chief Post Office. His nephew, John Buckley, a son of George Buckley, unveiled the additions on 17 September 1903.
