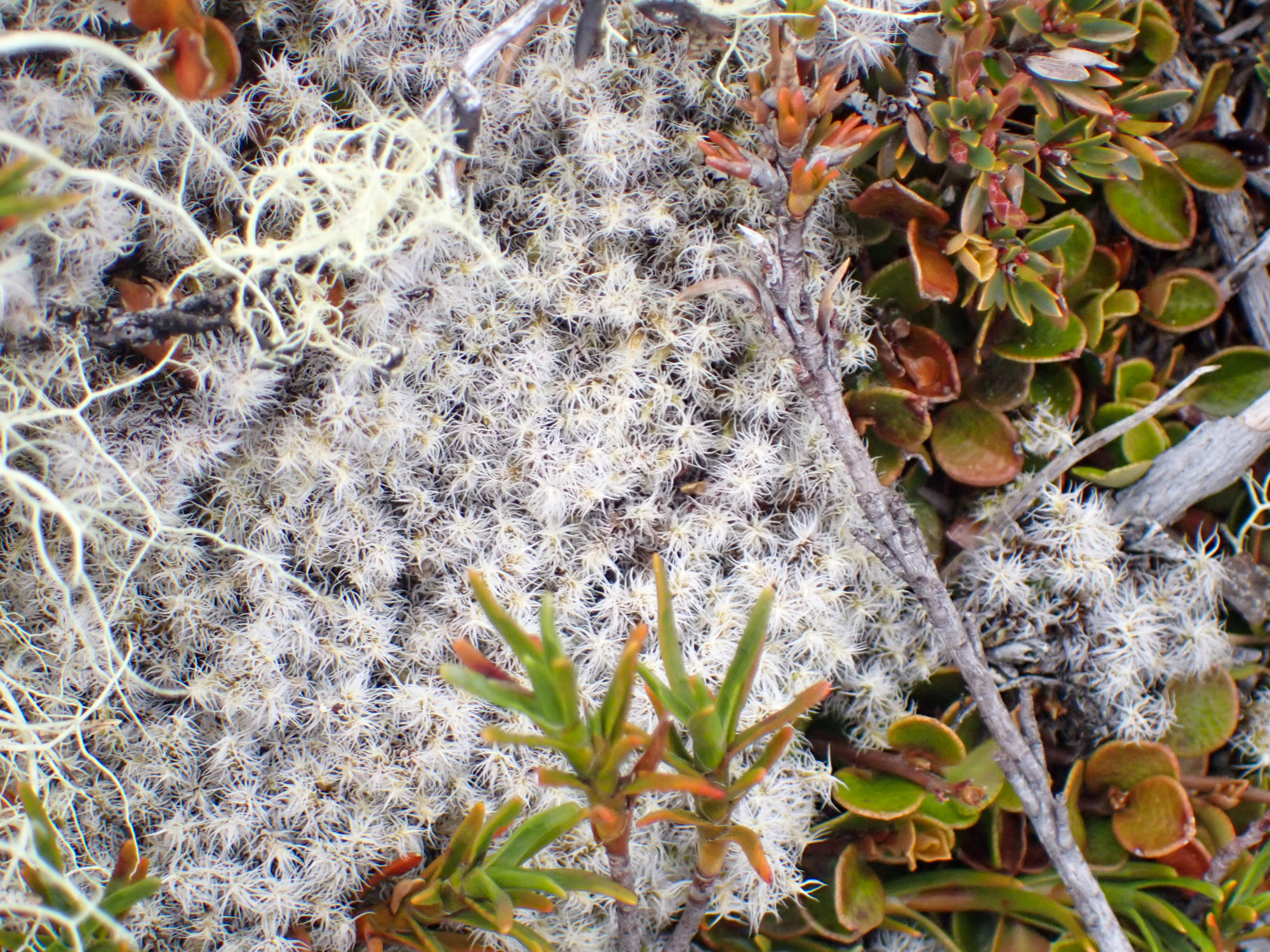

Scientific classification
- Kingdom: Plantae
- Division: Bryophyta
- Class: Bryopsida
- Subclass: Dicranidae
- Order: Grimmiales
- Family: Grimmiaceae
- Genus: Racomitrium
- Species: R. pruinosum

Binomial name
- Racomitrium pruinosum (Wils.) C.Muell.

= Racomitrium pruinosum =

Species of moss

Racomitrium pruinosum is a species of moss with white leaves. It is present in the southern hemisphere.

== Description ==
White leaves. The serrated edges of the leaves point towards the end of the leaf.

== Range ==
New Zealand.

== Habitat ==
Alpine habitats.
