= Allan McLean (philanthropist) =

New Zealand runholder and philanthropist (1822–1907)

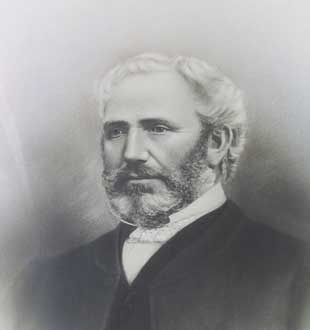
- Born: Allan McLean; 24 May 1822; Coll, Inner Hebrides, Scotland
- Died: 12 November 1907 (aged 85); Christchurch, New Zealand
- Parent(s): Alexander & Mary McLean (mother)
- Relatives: John McLean (brother); George Buckley (brother-in-law)

Allan McLean (24 May 1822 – 12 November 1907) was a New Zealand runholder and philanthropist. Moving from Scotland to Australia as a child, and to New Zealand as an adult, he rose from a working class shepherd, to sheep rancher and a rich land holder. In his seventies, McLean built 'Holly Lea' in Christchurch, which was renamed McLean's Mansion. After his death, the building served as the McLean Institute through an act of parliament. In 1899, his land was purchased by the Liberal Government as part of its policy of breaking up large holdings.

== Early life ==
He was born on Coll, one of the islands of the Inner Hebrides of Scotland, and baptised on 24 May 1822. His father, Alexander McLean, was a farmer and fisherman who lived on Lagmor, where he drowned in 1836. Initially, the family was sustained by the large tracts of land they owned on the Isles of Tiree and Mull as well as on the mainland at Mowern and Ardnamurchan. But over the years, they needed additional resources to make a livelihood and resorted to fisheries. After his father's death, his mother, Mary, could not make a living with the lands left to her and they were in a penurious state. Mary took the five surviving of her eight children to Australia in 1840 after widespread crop failure. Allan McLean and his brothers John and Robertson made a living as working class shepherds, and became established enough so that they could buy two sheep runs in west Victoria, which they owned from 1848 to 1851. They capitalised on the Victorian gold rush by supplying the goldfields region, becoming runholders.

== Life in New Zealand ==
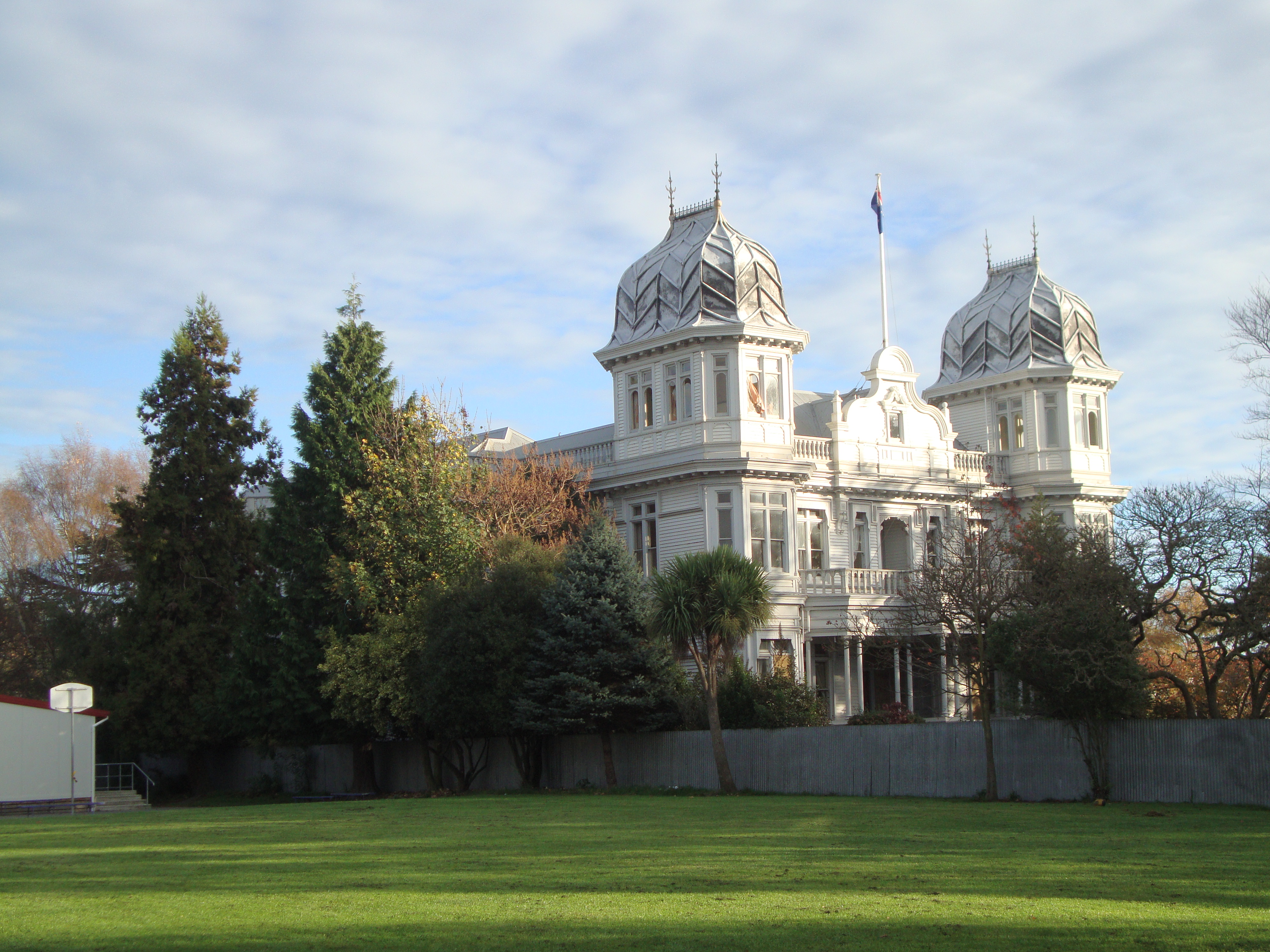
McLean's Mansion in May 2011

In 1852, the brothers purchased the Ashfield run adjacent to the Waimakariri River in Canterbury, New Zealand, and the family moved to that country. Robertson returned to Scotland but Allan and John owned runs in Canterbury, Otago, and Morven Hills, acquiring the Waikakahi property near Waimate from a Mr. Harris in 1866. Their sister Alexandrina had married George Buckley in 1860, and Buckley became a shareholder in the Waikakahi run, but sold out to the brothers in 1875. Eventually, Allan and John's partnership ended. By 1882, his properties had a value of 200,000 pounds. In 1895, he owned 69,000 sheep, and his horse teams ploughed 8,000 acres (3,200 ha). He lived at 'the Valley', a homestead surrounded by gardens. McLean's land was bought by the Liberal Government in 1899 as part of their policy of breaking up large land holdings. McLean was distressed by the forced sale of his land to the extent that he never returned to the district. For the government, it was the second largest purchase in Canterbury; the largest purchase was the estate of William Robinson around Cheviot.

McLean retired to Christchurch, where he had a house of enormous dimensions built in a fusion of Jacobean and Victorian style for himself. 'Holly Lea' contained 53 rooms on three floors spread over an area of 23,000 square feet (2,100 m^{2}) with lavish period furnishings and other embellishments. It is believed that at the time, 'Holly Lea' was the largest wooden residence in New Zealand. Later known as McLean's Mansion, the house is registered as a Category I heritage building by the New Zealand Historic Places Trust.

McLean remained a bachelor. After building his dream house, he enjoyed its ambiance for 5 years before dying there in 1907 aged 85. His health had been failing for some time He was buried at Addington Cemetery in the family grave; his mother, brother John and sisters Mary and Alexandrina were buried there before him.

Through his will, McLean made generous provisions for an institute that used his house "as a home for women of refinement and education in reduced or straitened circumstances". He endowed it with a fund of £300,000. The McLean Institute was formed and incorporated by an act of Parliament, the McLean Institute Act 1909 (No. 8).

McLean's Mansion is now being restored by the McLean's Mansion Charitable Trust, with plans to partially reopen the building in 2021.
