= Ōrangipuku River =

Coordinates: 42°39′S 171°26′E

Location
- Country: New Zealand

Physical characteristics
- Mouth
  - location: Lake Brunner
- Length: 10 kilometres (6.2 mi)

The Ōrangipuku River is a river of the West Coast Region of New Zealand's South Island. It flows north into the southern end of Lake Brunner.

== Relationship with Taramakau River ==
The Taramakau River crosses the Alpine Fault at Inchbonnie. At this point, it has in its history flowed in three different directions: westwards along its present course, northwards towards and into Lake Brunner via the Ōrangipuku River, and northeast through Lake Poerua, the Poerua River and the lower reaches of Crooked River into Lake Brunner. Inchbonnie is located on an alluvial fan that infills the three valleys. If the Taramakau River changed course at Inchbonnie, in addition to the damage to arable farming land, it would cause increased flows in the Arnold and Grey Rivers. The effective design capacity of existing flood protection works at Greymouth would be reduced, increasing the flood risk exposure of the town.

In the early 1900s, the Taramakau River overflowed into the Ōrangipuku River on several occasions, raising the risk of “breaking-through” to Lake Brunner. Investigations of river protection works began as early as 1907. In February 1946, floodwaters from the Taramakau again flowed into the Ōrangipuku River causing significant problems, and in October that year a proposal was developed to construct a stopbank along the north bank of the Taramakau River. In 1953 a small project involving 60 m (200 ft) of tree protection and 80 m (260 ft) of rockwork and was approved. However, by 1958, erosion had progressed to the point that there was only 5 m (16 ft) of land remaining between the Taramakau and Ōrangipuku Rivers, and emergency works were required. A report prepared in March 1959 recommended construction of 2.5 kilometres (1.6 mi) of new stopbanks, strengthening and raising 1.2 kilometres (0.75 mi) of existing stopbanks, plus 2.5 kilometres (1.6 mi) of new rock rip rap, and diverting the upper section of the Ōrangipuku River into the Taramakau River. This proposal was only partially implemented to contain costs for ratepayers, with works including 900 metres (3,000 ft) of rock riprap, and strengthening and raising stopbanks where there was inadequate freeboard. In August 1959, a 3:1 subsidy was provided by the NZ Soil Conservation and River Control Council for a larger project involving placement of 17,300 tonnes of rock, 9,000 cubic metres of fill for stopbanks and 3,200 tonnes of rock for “topping-up”.

The river protection works at Inchbonnie are some of the most critical flood defences managed by the West Coast Regional Council, because of the widespread consequences if they failed.

== See also ==
- List of rivers of New Zealand
