= Brown River (West Coast) =

Coordinates: 42.664867°S 171.535834°E

Location
- Country: New Zealand

Physical characteristics
- Mouth
  - location: Poerua River
- Length: 6 km (3.7 mi)

The Brown River is a short river of New Zealand. It flows northwest to meet the Poerua River five kilometres southeast of Lake Brunner.

== See also ==
- List of rivers of New Zealand
