= Evans River =

Coordinates: 42°38′10″S 171°38′46″E

Location
- Country: New Zealand

Physical characteristics
- Source
  - location: Southern Alps
- Mouth
  - location: Crooked River
- Length: 8 km (5.0 mi)

The Evans River is a short river in New Zealand's South Island. It arises near Mount O'Shanessy in the Kaimata Range of the Southern Alps and flows north-west and then south-west, joining the Crooked River several kilometres before the latter's outflow into Lake Brunner.

The river is on private land.

== See also ==
- List of rivers of New Zealand
