= Poerua River =

Poerua River may refer to one of two rivers on the West Coast of New Zealand's South Island:

- Poerua River (Grey District)
- Poerua River (Westland District)
