= Kangaroo Lake =

Kangaroo Lake may refer to:

- Kangaroo Lake (California)
- Kangaroo Lake (Wisconsin)
- Kangaroo Lake (New Zealand)
