= Mount Te Kinga =

Mountain in the South Island of New Zealand

- Tekimoka
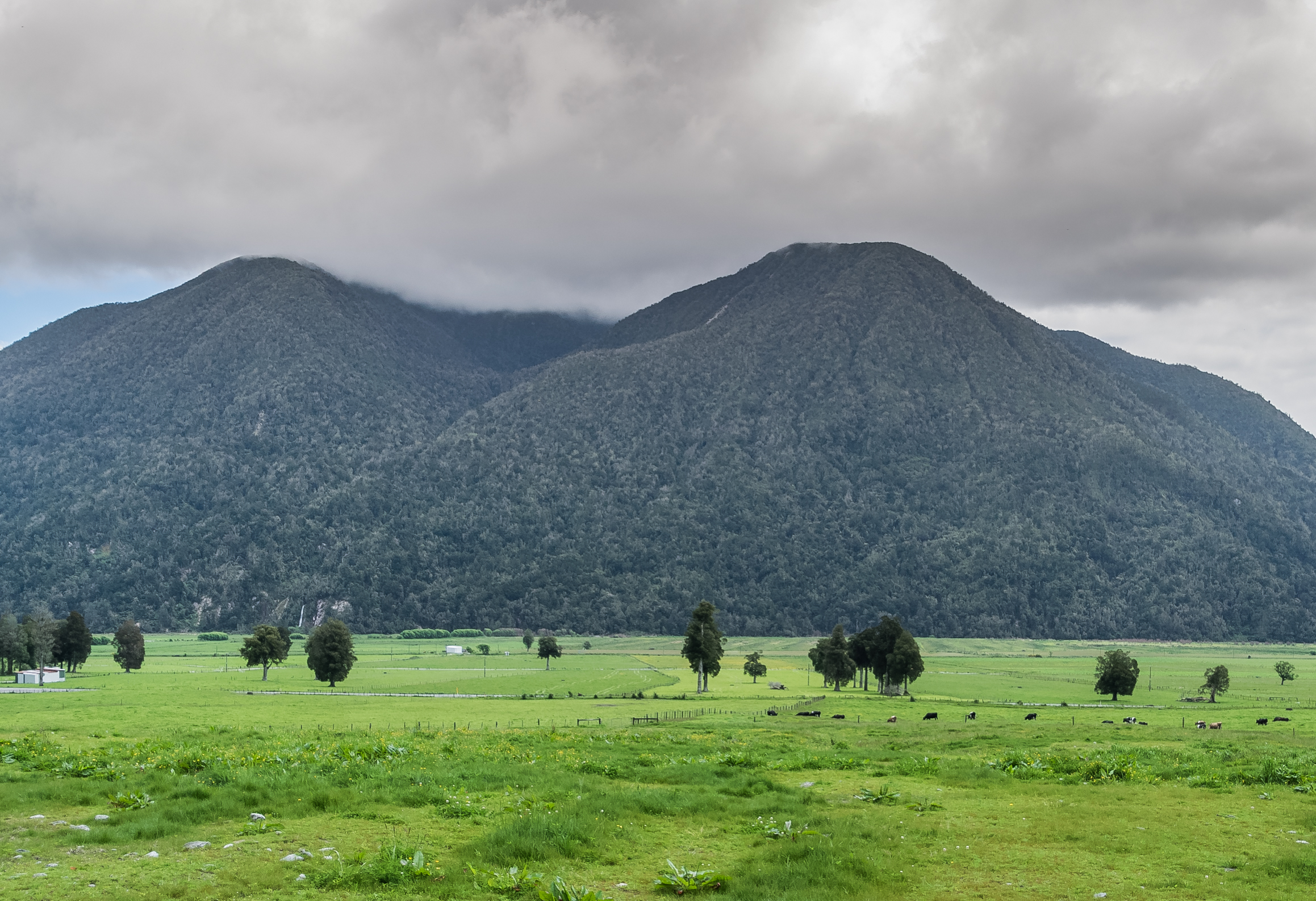
- Mount Te Kinga, as seen from Lake Brunner Road

Highest point
- Elevation: 1,204 m (3,950 ft)
- Prominence: 1,064 m (3,491 ft)
- Coordinates: 42.661°S 171.501°E

Dimensions
- Length: 9 km (5.6 mi) North-South
- Width: 6.5 km (4.0 mi) East-West
- Area: 3,700 hectares (9,100 acres)

Naming
- Etymology: Misconstruction of Māori name Tekimoka
- Native name: Tekimoka (Māori)

Geography
- Location within New Zealand
- Country: New Zealand
- Region: West Coast
- District: Grey District

Mount Te Kinga (Māori: Tekimoka) is a mountain on the West Coast of New Zealand's South Island within the western foothills of the Southern Alps / Kā Tiritiri o te Moana. The mountain is on the south-eastern shore of Lake Brunner and is not a part of a larger mountain range, being separated from the Hohonu Range to the west by the Ōrangipuku River and from the Alexander Range to the southeast by the Poerua River. Numerous small creeks flow from Te Kinga, all of which end up eventually flowing into the nearby Lake Brunner.

Despite being surrounded by former wetlands which have been converted into dairy farms, Te Kinga has been largely untouched. Almost the entire mountain is covered by native forest, with the lower reaches containing large old-growth podocarp trees, including tōtara, rimu, kahikatea and miro. As the altitude increases the vegetation gradually shifts, including larger amounts of species such as kaikawaka, neinei and southern rātā. From an altitude of about 1,000 metres (3,300 ft), the vegetation thins out and gradually shifts to pink pine, followed by the scree slopes and tussock cover typical of alpine environments in New Zealand.

The summit can be accessed via an eight-hour tramp from Cashmere Bay of Lake Brunner, along the mountain's northern ridge. This track increases in difficulty along its length, with the first portion to a lookout graded as an easy tramp. Beyond this point, the track to the summit of Te Kinga is much more difficult, recommended for expert trampers only. The risk which the mountain can pose became apparent in 2014, when a search and rescue operation was launched after two day walkers became lost on their return journey from the summit.

Te Kinga's mostly preserved forests make it home for a range of native bird life. This in turn has resulted in the mountain being a popular candidate for pest control. In 2020, $15.7 million in funding was announced to remove pests, primarily possums, from the mountain as part of the Predator Free 2050 project. At the time, it was announced that this would be done using a mix of 1080 poison, trapping and monitoring to maintain a natural barrier and prevent pest species from reintroduction.
