= Lake Poerua =

Lake in New Zealand

- Pouerua (Māori)
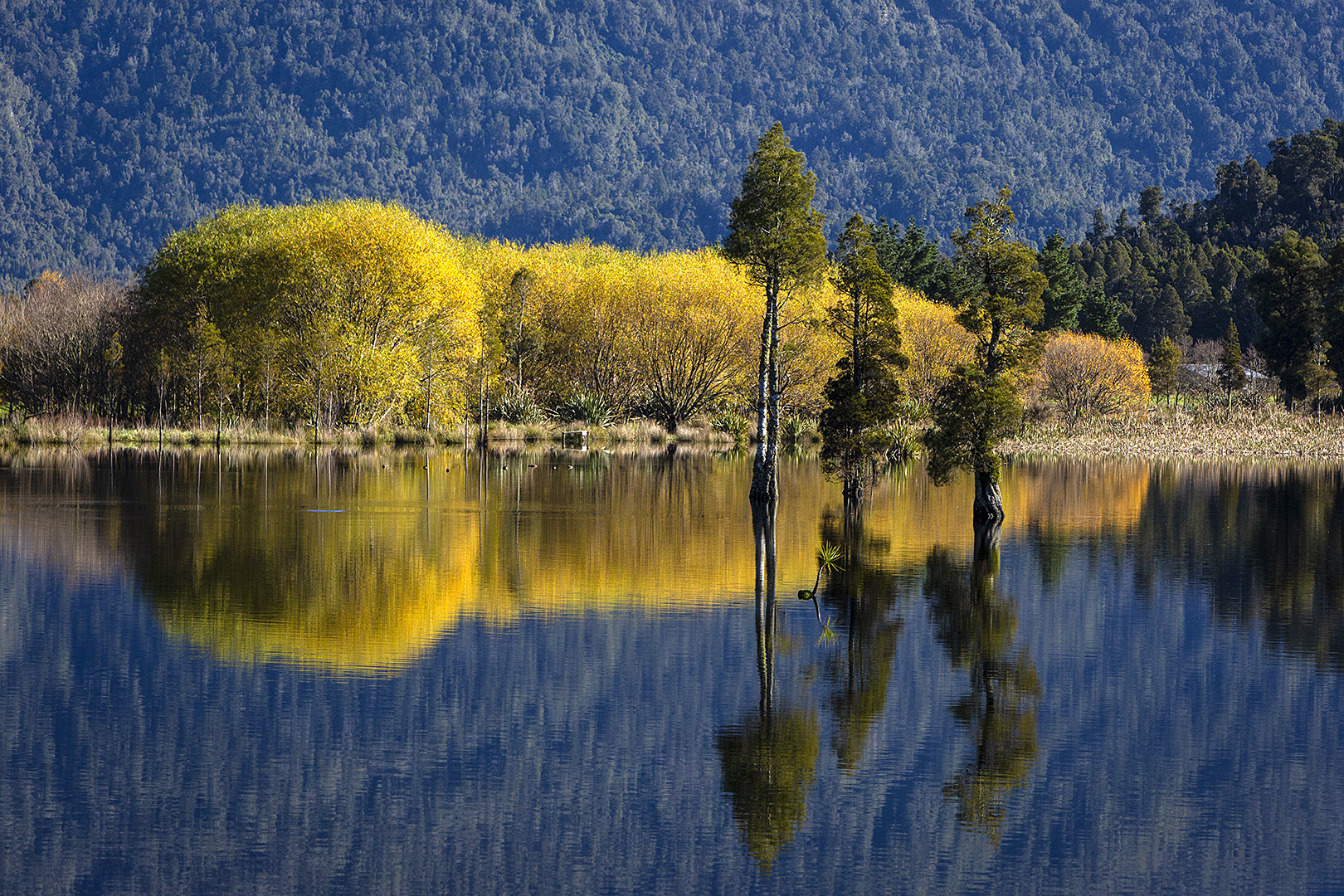
- Willow and kahikatea reflections at Lake Poerua

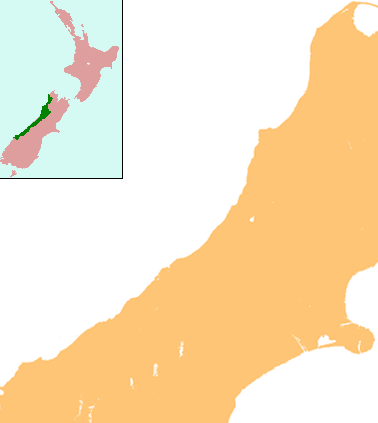
- Location within West Coast
- Interactive map of Lake Poerua
- Location: West Coast region, South Island
- Coordinates: 42°42′S 171°30′E
- Primary outflows: Poerua River
- Basin countries: New Zealand
- Surface area: 212.7 hectares (526 acres)
- Max. depth: 6.9 metres (23 ft)
- Surface elevation: 125 metres (410 ft)

Lake Poerua (Māori: Pouerua) is a shallow lake located in the West Coast region of New Zealand's South Island roughly 13 km southeast from Lake Brunner. It is located between the Alexander Range and the slopes of Mount Te Kinga, to the north of the lake. The area around Lake Poerua is sparsely populated. A number of small streams flow into the lake, and the Poerua River flows from the lake into the Crooked River, which leads to Lake Brunner.

The first description of the lake by Europeans comes from the journeys of Julius von Haast, who explored the West Coast region in the 1860s. The lake is bounded on its eastern side by the main fault scarp of the Alpine Fault, and is believed to be very recent in geological age. Lake Poerua sits on the Australia-Pacific plate boundary, with granite rock from the Australian plate to the west and metasedimentary rocks from the Pacific plate to the east.

The lake is popular with trout fishermen and is easily accessible from the adjacent road. The lake has submerged or partly submerged tree stumps and large granite boulders at or below the waterline that can present a hazard for boating.

The lake is just to the north of the settlement of Inchbonnie, and Lake Brunner Road (linking State Highways 7 and 73) and the Midland Line railway run along the eastern shore of the lake.

The lake and surrounding area has been a popular place for visitors and picnics.

A wetland on the shores of the north end of Lake Poerua has been identified in a schedule of Significant Wetlands of the West Coast Region, published by Westland Regional Council.

Lake Poerua impressions

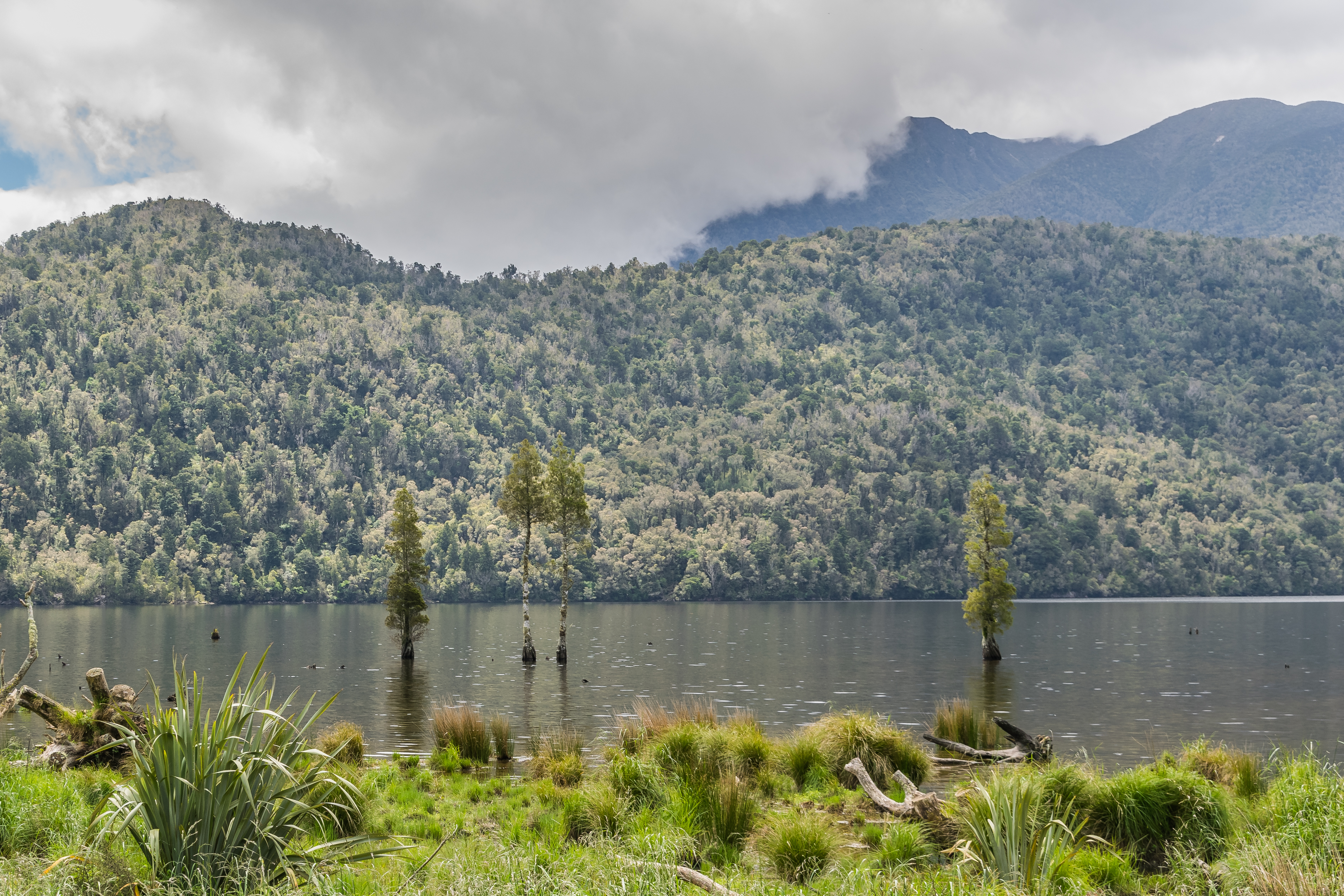

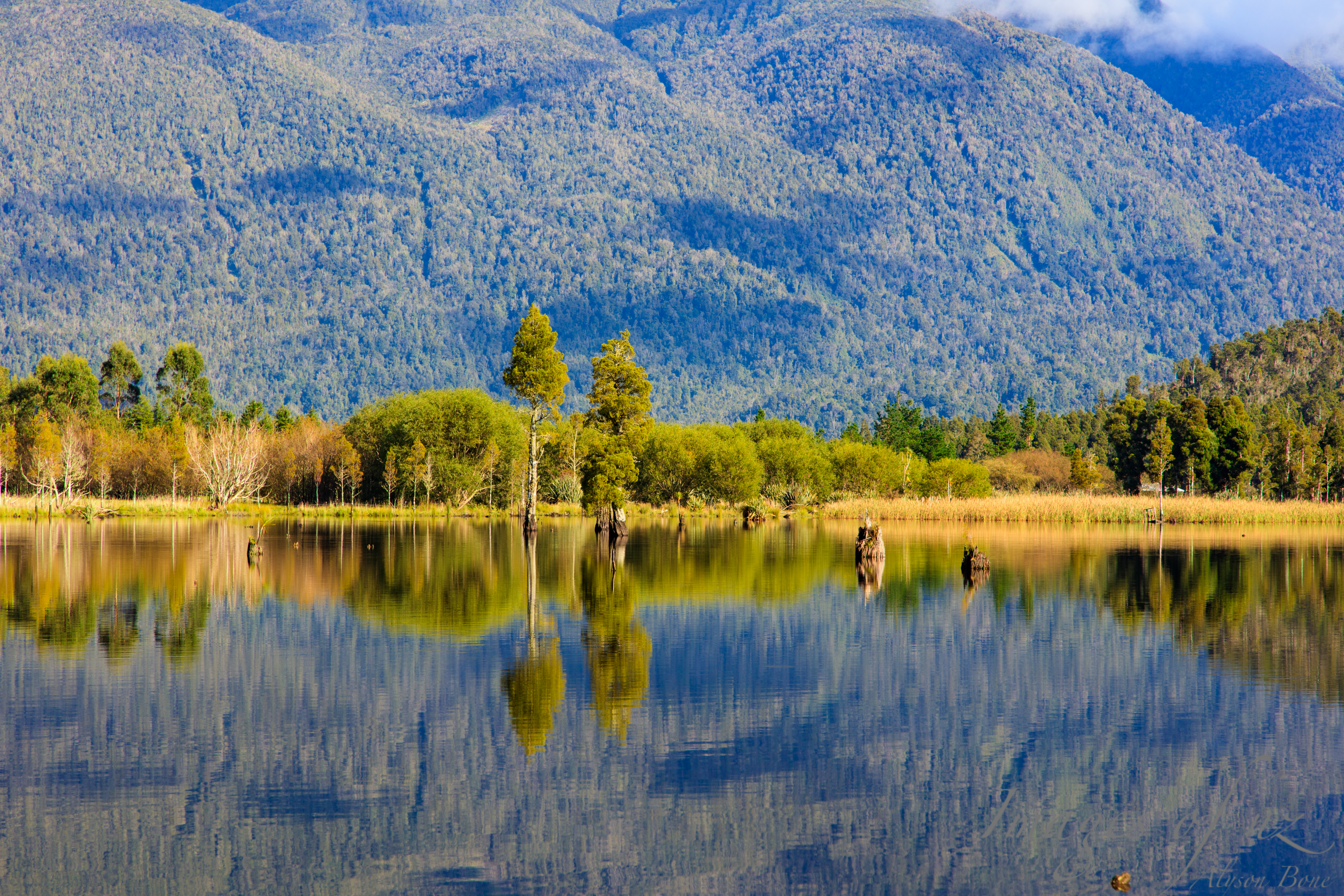

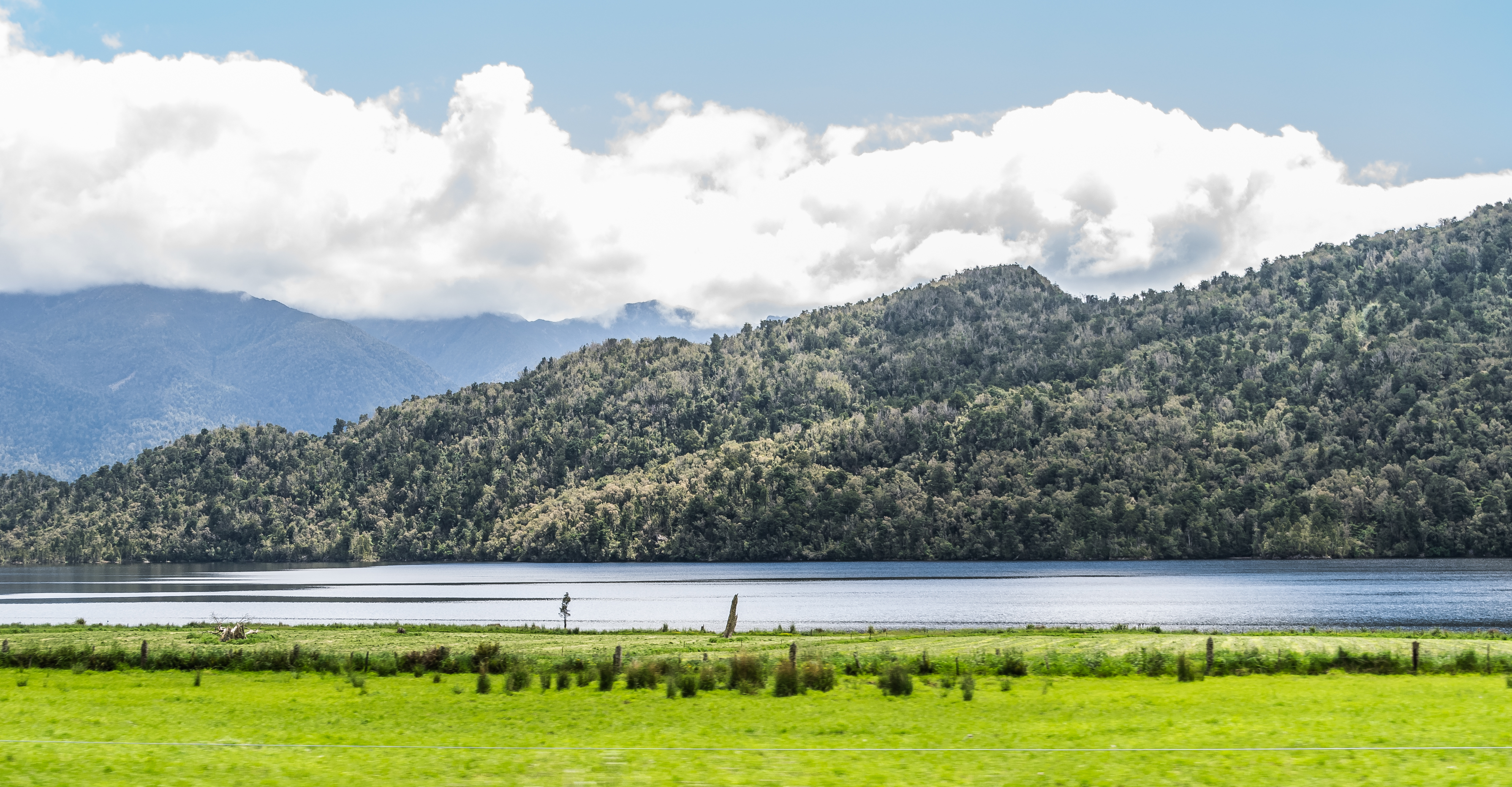
