= Kangaroo Lake (New Zealand) =

Lake in New Zealand

- Location of Kangaroo Lake in New Zealand
- Interactive map of Kangaroo Lake
- Location: Grey District, West Coast region, South Island
- Coordinates: 42.6125°S 171.5503°E
- Etymology: Named for a mining party in the area
- Primary inflows: Eight unnamed streams
- Primary outflows: No surface outflow
- Catchment area: 6.05 square kilometres (2.34 sq mi)
- Max. length: 2.2 kilometres (1.4 mi)
- Max. width: 860 metres (2,820 ft)
- Surface area: 125.5 hectares (310 acres)
- Average depth: 9.5 metres (31 ft)
- Surface elevation: 99 metres (325 ft)

Kangaroo Lake is a small dystrophic lake on the West Coast of New Zealand's South Island. The lake is roughly 3 kilometres (1.9 mi) east of the much larger Lake Brunner, and is popular with both duck hunters and recreational fishermen. There is no road access to the lake, with access only via tracks.

During the West Coast gold rush of the 1860s, the lake was the scene of a rush in which a party of some 800 men followed a so-called "kangaroo party" which held a claim near the lake. The men were ferried across Kangaroo Lake, with up to a quarter of them suffering hardship as a result of the swamp around the lake.

Along with nearby lakes Hochstetter, Ahaura, Haupiri, Brunner, Lady and Poerua, Kangaroo Lake is part of a series of interconnected lakes known collectively as the North Westland Ecological Region Complex. These lakes are all fluvio-glacial in origin, having been formed by large glaciers from the nearby Southern Alps / Kā Tiritiri o te Moana during the Last Glacial Maximum.

== Ecology ==
Due to its position in the wider lake complex and the amount of undisturbed forest surround it, Kangaroo Lake has a relatively high ecological value. The area around the lake consists of a mix of native beech forest and wetlands, with a wide range of plant species – among them raupō, kahikatea, harakeke, mānuka, as well as several species of sedges and grasses. This provides an important habitat for a variety of native and introduced waterbirds, including the endangered Australasian bittern and South Island fernbird. As with many wetlands in New Zealand, birds such as the pūkeko, black swan, New Zealand scaup and New Zealand shoveler are also common at the lake.

To protect the lake's ecosystem and surrounding habitat, the lake and its wetlands are gazetted as stewardship land managed by the Department of Conservation.

== See also ==
- Lakes of New Zealand
