= Inchbonnie =

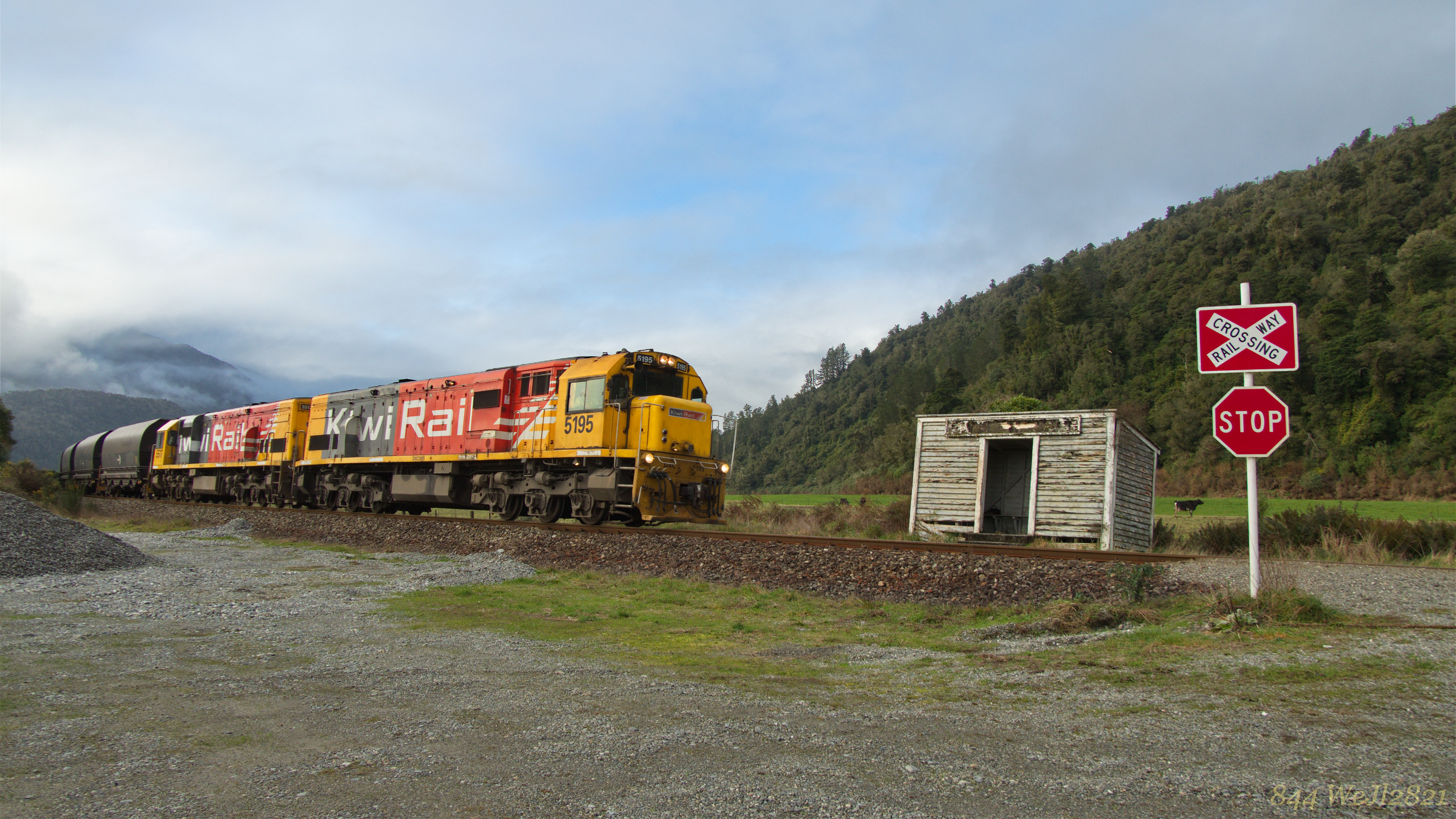
- Coal train passing Inchbonnie shelter (2021)

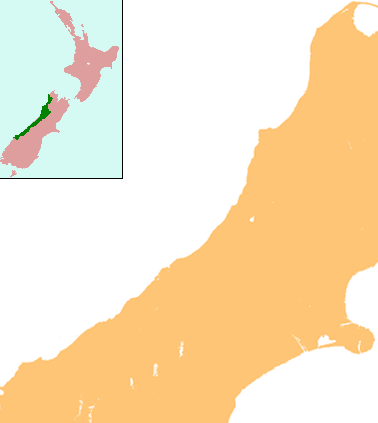
- Location within West Coast
- Coordinates: 42°43′38″S 171°28′22″E
- Country: New Zealand
- Region: West Coast
- District: Grey District
- Electorates: West Coast-Tasman; Te Tai Tonga
- Time zone: UTC+12 (NZST)
  - Summer (DST): UTC+13 (NZDT)
- Postcode: 7875
- Area code: 03
- Local iwi: Ngāi Tahu

Inchbonnie is a rural locality in the West Coast region of the South Island of New Zealand. It is located on the north bank of the Taramakau River and is just to the south of Lake Poerua. "Inchbonnie" is a hybrid of Lowland Scots, bonnie meaning "pretty" and Scottish Gaelic innis meaning island, often anglicised as "Inch", as in Inchkeith or Inchkenneth in Scotland.

== Location ==
State Highway 73 and the Midland Line railway both pass through Inchbonnie, though the TranzAlpine passenger train does not stop. Prior to the opening of the road bridge in December 1972, the only crossing of the Taramakau River at Inchbonnie was the railway bridge on the Midland Line. Anecdotal history reports that locals in the Inchbonnie area adapted vehicles to run on the railway bridge so that they could cross to the pub at Jacksons.

Inchbonnie has a mean annual rainfall of around 5,000 millimetres (200 in) and up to 283 millimetres (11.1 in) has been recorded in a 24 hour period.

Locations around Inchbonnie are of particular interest for the study of plate tectonics and earthquakes in New Zealand, because the Alpine Fault transitions into the Marlborough Fault System in this area.

On 17 March 2006, Inchbonnie was the location for the release of insects in an attempt to eradicate the ragwort weed from the West Coast.

In May 2021, the West Coast Regional Council announced that it was selling all five of its quarries, including one at Inchbonnie. The quarries had been used historically for sourcing rocks for river protection works.

In April 2022, Inchbonnie was identified by the Grey District Council as one of 18 areas in the District that have been identified as highly arable land, for the purposes of considering future restrictions on subdivision.

== Stopbanks on Taramakau River ==
The Taramakau River crosses the Alpine Fault at Inchbonnie. At this point, it has in its history flowed in three different directions: westwards along its present course, northwards towards and into Lake Brunner, and northeast through Lake Poerua and then into Lake Brunner along the lower reaches of Crooked River. Inchbonnie is located on an alluvial fan that infills the three valleys. If the Taramakau River changed course at Inchbonnie, in addition to the damage to arable farming land, it would cause increased flows in the Arnold and Grey Rivers. The effective design capacity of existing flood protection works at Greymouth would be reduced, increasing the flood risk exposure of the town.

In the early 1900’s, the Taramakau River overflowed into the Orangipuku River on several occasions, raising the risk of “breaking-through” to Lake Brunner. Investigations of river protection works began as early as 1907. In February 1946, floodwaters from the Taramakau again flowed into the Orangipuku River causing significant problems, and in October that year a proposal was developed to construct a stopbank along the north bank of the Taramakau River. In 1953 a small project involving 60 metres of tree protection and 80 metres of rockwork and was approved. However, by 1958, erosion had progressed to the point that there was only 5 metres of land remaining between the Taramakau and Orangipuku Rivers, and emergency works were required. A report prepared in March 1959 recommended construction of 2.5 kilometres (1.6 mi) of new stopbanks, strengthening and raising 1.2 kilometres (0.75 mi) of existing stopbanks, plus 2.5 kilometres (1.6 mi) of new rock rip rap, and diverting the upper section of the Orangipuku River into the Taramakau River. This proposal was only partially implemented to contain costs for ratepayers, with works including 900 metres (3,000 ft) of rock riprap, and strengthening and raising stopbanks where there was inadequate freeboard. In August 1959, a 3:1 subsidy was provided by the NZ Soil Conservation and River Control Council for a larger project involving placement of 17,300 tonnes of rock, 9,000 cubic metres of fill for stopbanks and 3,200 tonnes of rock for “topping-up”.

The river protection works on the Taramakau River at Inchbonnie are some of the most critical flood defences managed by the West Coast Regional Council, because of the widespread consequences if they failed.

== Inchbonnie hydro station ==
A 1.7 MW run-of-the-river hydro station was commissioned on the slopes of the Hohonu range to the north of the Taramakau River in January 2016. The scheme draws water from the catchments of two streams in the Hohonu range,
