= John Rochfort (surveyor) =

New Zealand surveyor and engineer

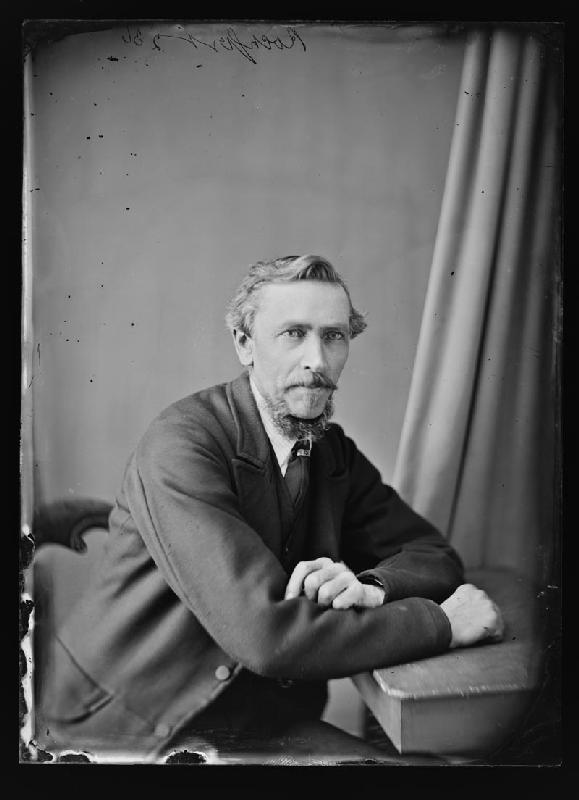
- John Rochfort
- Born: 21 May 1832; London
- Died: 8 March 1893 (aged 60); Kihikihi
- Occupations: Surveyor and engineer
- Notable work: Surveyor and engineer on the construction of the North Island Main Trunk Line
- Spouses: Mary Elizabeth Hackett (m. 1863; died 1864) Amelia Susan Lewis (m. 1867)

John Rochfort (21 May 1832 – 8 March 1893) was a New Zealand surveyor and engineer.

== Early life ==
John Rochfort was born in London, England, the youngest son of Frank senior, a goldsmith, silversmith and jeweller, and Sarah (née Button). He was one of nine children born between 1818 and 1837. His older brother James, born in 1830, was a qualified architect and surveyor who was employed for seven years at a large practice in London under an architect who was also the district surveyor of St James’s, Westminster. John followed James into the profession, and by the age of nineteen when he first left for New Zealand he was qualified to work as a surveyor and draughtsman.

== Visit to New Zealand ==
John and James Rochfort arrived in New Zealand in February 1852 on the Marmora. The Marmora stopped at Lyttelton for ten days and then took them to Wellington. When they disembarked, James realised that he wouldn’t find work as an architect so departed for Sydney. John found work as a surveyor, but the pay was so low that he decided to go to the goldfields in Victoria.

After quitting his job, John walked across the Rimutaka Range to Port Ahuriri (Napier) through the bush just to experience more of the country. He sailed from Ahuriri to Wellington, and departed for Melbourne on the barque Napoleon in July 1852. Before leaving New Zealand, the Napoleon put in at Nelson, which made a good impression on him and no doubt influenced his decision to later emigrate there.

== Emigration to New Zealand ==
After several months on the Victorian Goldfields, where he met up and spent some time gold mining with his older brother Joseph, John decided to return to New Zealand. However, while in Melbourne he received word (probably that his father was seriously ill), so instead returned to England. Following the death of Frank senior in August 1853, John, his mother Sarah, and siblings Mary Dorothy, Frank junior, James and Augusta emigrated to New Zealand. They arrived in Nelson in December 1854. The family soon established themselves in the province, where Frank had a store on Haven Road in Port Nelson, and Sarah, Frank and James had a sawmill and a farm called Knowle Wood in the Riwaka Valley, on the western side of Tasman Bay / Te Tai-o-Aorere. However, by the end of 1858 the farm, sawmill and store had all been taken by creditors to pay off their debts. John was referred to as living at Haven Road and Riwaka, employed as a surveyor, but was not financially invested in the family businesses.

== Professional life ==
In 1855 John Rochfort became an approved surveyor, contracting work for the Nelson provincial survey department. His work took him to Golden Bay in the west of the province and to the Sounds in the east. By 1858 he was living in the Sounds, advertising for private work as well as tendering for Government contracts. In 1859 he won the contract to survey Nelson’s portion of the West Coast. The West Coast survey lasted from February 1859 till August 1860, and was notable especially for the discovery of gold in the Buller River in November 1859.

After the completion of the West Coast survey Rochfort spent a short time at the Waimangaroa diggings just north of the Buller. In late 1861 he explored a route from the Grey Valley on the West Coast to the Hanmer Plain on the East Coast via the Amuri Pass. He held off giving details of the discovery until the Provincial Government promised him payment. Afterwards he was hired to make a track along the route, and at about that time he became employed full time as an assistant provincial surveyor.

In 1864 Rochfort left the Nelson provincial survey department and became an assistant provincial surveyor for Canterbury instead. He spent most of the year engaged on Canterbury’s portion of the West Coast, where he witnessed a large influx of population as several gold rushes took place. During 1865 his work on the West Coast included laying out the town of Greymouth.

By the end of 1865 he was living in Halswell near Christchurch, where he continued working for the Canterbury Provincial Government until 1869. Afterwards he opened a soap making factory, which he ran for about six months until returning to Nelson. In 1870 he was contracted by the General Government to select a line in the Rimutaka Range north of Wellington for the Napier to Wellington Railway. In 1873 he was then employed to survey the route he had selected. Later that year he was contracted by the General Government to make a flying survey from Foxhill in Nelson through the rugged country to Brunnerton near Greymouth for a proposed railway line.

In 1874 Rochfort became the engineer for the Timaru and Gladstone Board of Works in South Canterbury. He was employed there until 1876, when the department was dissolved due to the abolition of the provinces. Afterwards he returned to Nelson, where he established a private practice and was variously employed on jobs for Road Boards or mining companies.

In 1882 Rochfort was contracted by the General Government to survey a route for the proposed Main Trunk Line between Wellington and Te Awamutu in the Waikato. The survey involved great danger, crossing through territory of supporters of the Maori King who did not want the railway passing through their land. He later recalled, “I met with continual native obstruction, was many times stopped, once a prisoner for eight days, and twice fired upon.”

Rochfort had initially left his Nelson business temporarily, but having completed the survey at the end of 1884, he was employed as an engineer to form the Main Trunk Line. He sold his business and made his move to the North Island permanent, despite his family staying in Nelson. He worked for the Public Works Department until 1888, when it was merged with the Railway Department and he was made redundant. Afterwards he based himself in Kihikihi near Te Awamutu, where he contracted surveys for the Native Land Court.

== Family and death ==
In 1863 Rochfort married Mary Elizabeth Hackett. She remained in Nelson while he was surveying on the West Coast for Canterbury Province, but he completed his work in time for the birth of their daughter in September 1864. Mary died of an inflammation of the lungs six days after the birth.

In 1867 he married Amelia Susan Lewis. She was the daughter of Henry Lewis, a former colleague at the Nelson Provincial survey department, and was thirteen years his junior. Their first son was born at Halswell in Canterbury the following year. Over the next nine years they had five daughters, born in the various places where the family had moved with Rochfort's employment. Their youngest child, a son, was born in Nelson in 1878.

Based at Kihikihi from about 1887, Rochfort probably had a de facto wife. She was a local Maori woman of high enough standing to expect a parcel of land during a ruling from the Native Land Court. They built a house on the land, but when the settlement of 200 acres didn’t come through, they were left with just a few acres, which was barely enough to support the house.

Rochfort died in 1893 of heart disease. He was employed at the time surveying near Kihikihi for the Native Land Court. He returned to town for a few days to get fresh supplies, ate a meal at the Star Hotel, and died seated in the parlour. He was 60 years old.
