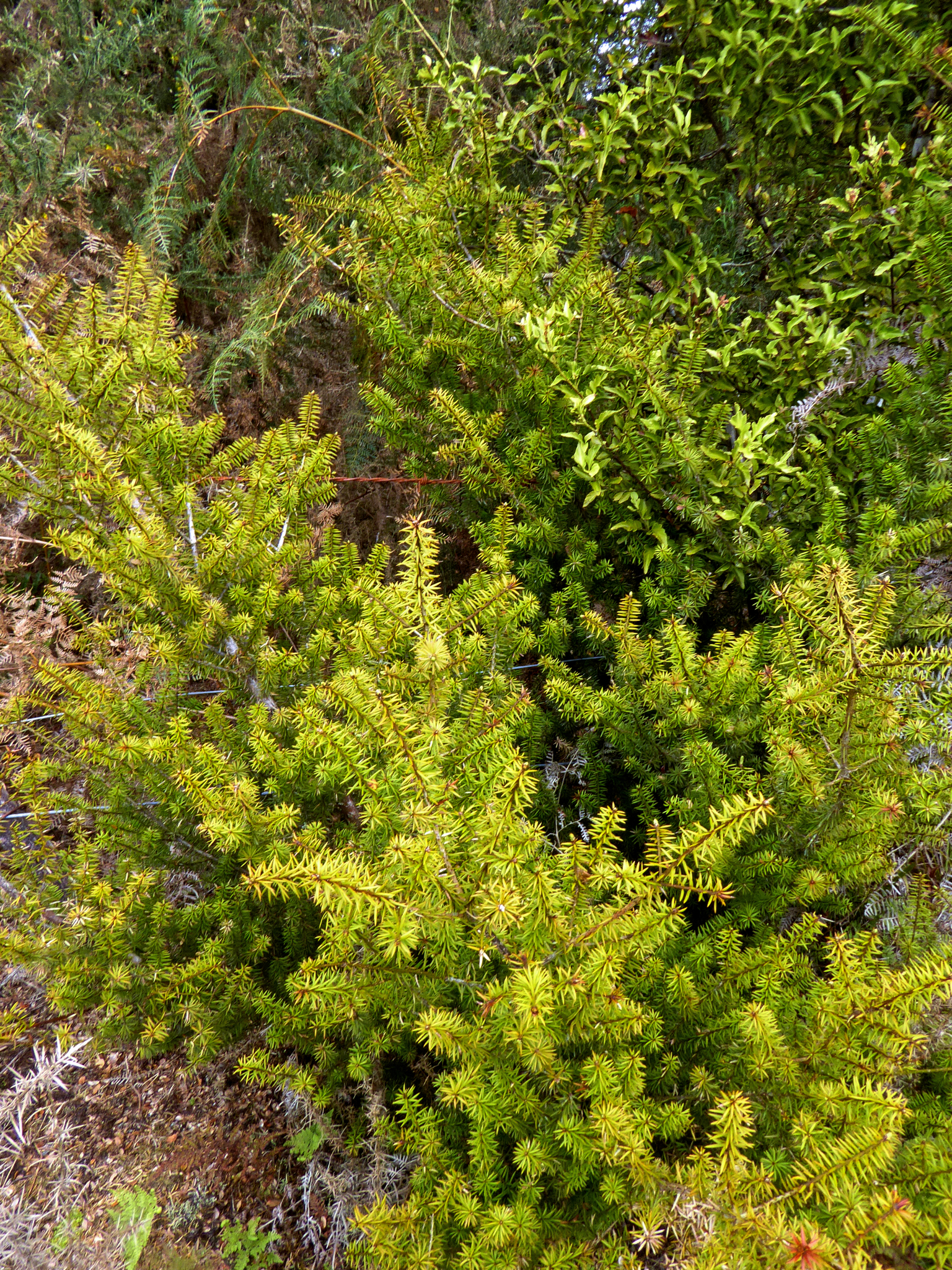

Conservation status
- Least Concern (IUCN 3.1)

Scientific classification
- Kingdom: Plantae
- Clade: Tracheophytes
- Clade: Gymnosperms
- Division: Pinophyta
- Class: Pinopsida
- Order: Araucariales
- Family: Podocarpaceae
- Genus: Podocarpus
- Species: P. acutifolius

Binomial name
- Podocarpus acutifolius Kirk

Synonyms
- Nageia acutifolia (Kirk) Kuntze; Nageia kirkiana Kuntze, nom. illeg. superfl.

= Podocarpus acutifolius =

Species of plant endemic to New Zealand

Podocarpus acutifolius, commonly known as needle-leaved tōtara, is a species of conifer in the family Podocarpaceae. This species is endemic to New Zealand.

== Etymology ==
The specific epithet, acutifolius, meaning "thorny leaves", is derived from Latin acutus (pointed, acute), and -folius (-leaved), and refers to the characteristic shape of the leaves.

== Distribution ==
This species is found in the South Island from northern Marlborough westward and south to southern Westland. Its natural habitat is lowland and montane forest and scrub.
