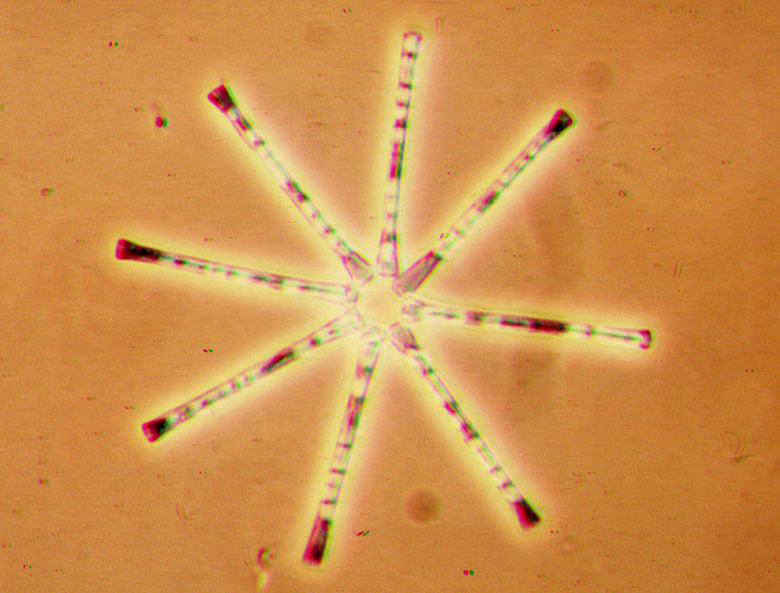
- Asterionella formosa

Scientific classification
- Domain: Eukaryota
- Clade: Sar
- Clade: Stramenopiles
- Division: Ochrophyta
- Clade: Bacillariophyta
- Class: Fragilariophyceae
- Order: Tabellariales
- Family: Tabellariaceae
- Genus: Asterionella; A.H. Hassall (1850)

Species
- See text

= Asterionella =

Genus of single-celled organisms

Asterionella is a genus of pennate freshwater diatoms. They are frequently found in star-shaped colonies of individuals.

== Description ==
Asterionella average cell size is 60–85 micrometers long and 2–4 micrometers wide. It forms colonies that often consist of eight cells, but can vary up to 20 cells. The cells in the colony are attached by the apex by extracellular matter. By the way the cells are attached to each other, the colonies often look like stars or spiraling chains.

== Reproduction ==
The silica skeleton of a diatom cell (called the frustule) consists of an epitheca and an hypotheca. The hypotheca is slightly smaller than the epitheca. During asexual reproduction both thecae form the epitheca of the new daughter cell and each daughter produces a new hypotheca. Therefore one daughter cell is always smaller than the original cell. In order to regain their original size, it is usually assumed diatoms have to reproduce sexually, although this has not yet been observed in A. formosa. However, there may also be other ways to rejuvenate.

== Ecology ==
Asterionella formosa is known to be susceptible to the chytrid fungus Zygorhizidium planktonicum. If a chytrid attaches to an Asterionella cell, they can, however, protect others of their kind by committing apoptosis, or cellular suicide, stopping the spread of the parasite. This is called a hypersensitive reaction. Asterionella have no means of locomotion. It is most likely a combination of gravity and currents that distribute the organism.

== Species ==
- Asterionella bleakeleyi
- Asterionella candelabrum
- Asterionella formosa
- Asterionella glacialis
- Asterionella japonica
- Asterionella madagascariensis
- Asterionella ralfsii
