= Crooked River (New Zealand) =

Coordinates: 42°36′S 171°28′E

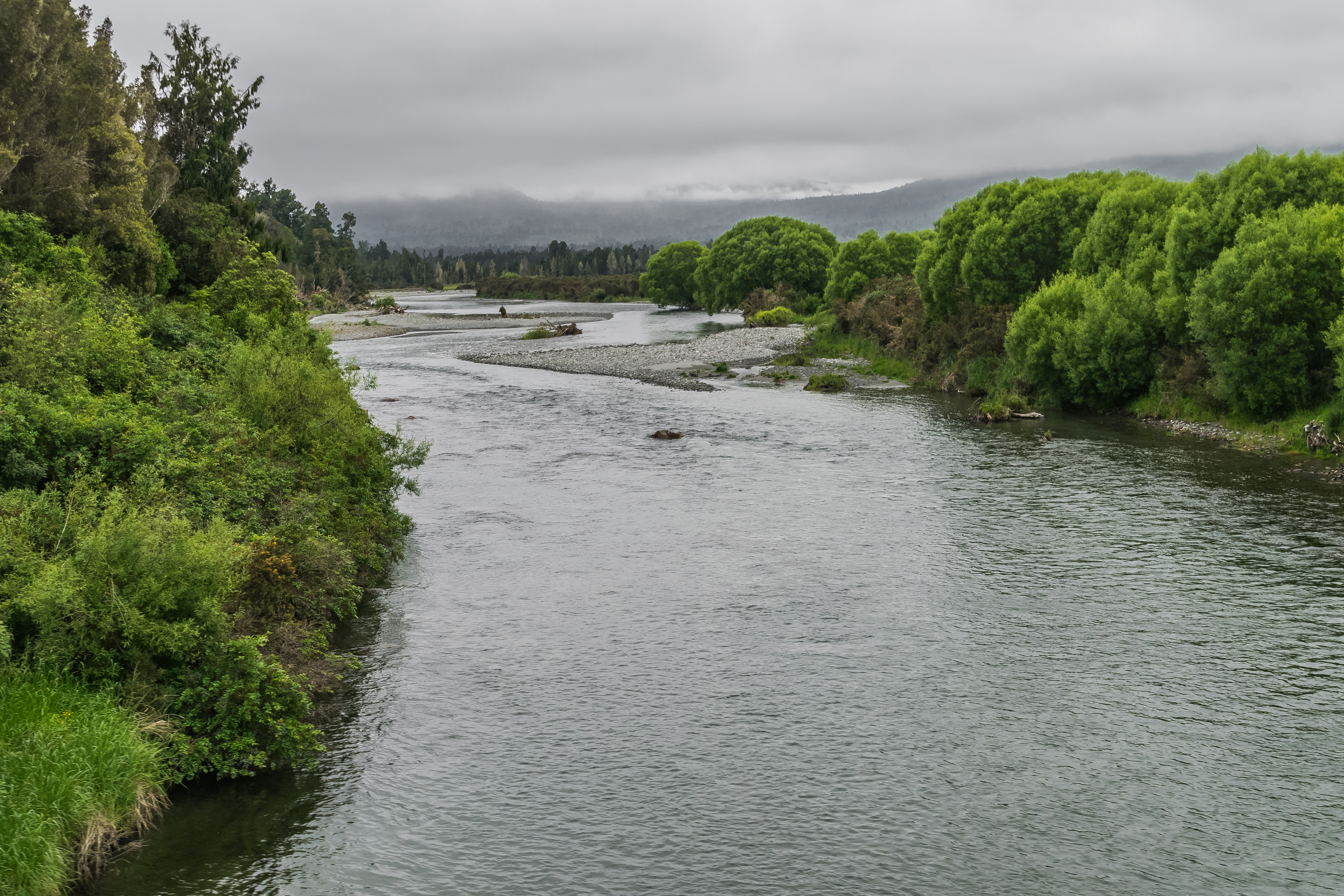

Location
- Country: New Zealand

Physical characteristics
- Source
  - location: Kaimata Range
  - elevation: 1,250 m (4,100 ft)
- Mouth
  - location: Lake Brunner
  - elevation: 85 m (279 ft)
- Length: 31 km (19 mi)

Crooked River is a river that flows from headwaters in the Southern Alps to Lake Brunner in the West Coast region of New Zealand's South Island. It is named for the erratic path it takes. Near Lake Brunner, it passes through reasonably flat farmland, but closer to its source, it rushes through gorges and rapids. One tributary is the Poerua River from Lake Poerua.

Fishers visit Crooked River to catch trout. The river is also used by canoeists. Recently, there has been a minor silt build-up in the river's middle reaches.

There are two backcountry huts available for trampers along the Crooked River.
