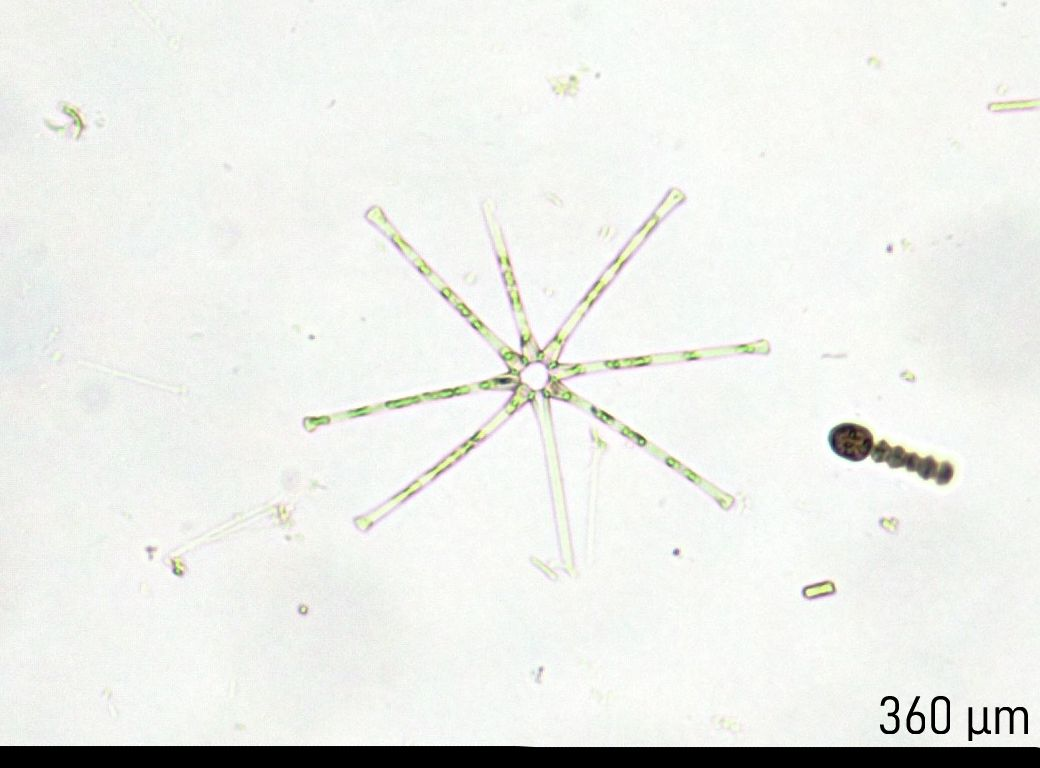

Scientific classification
- Domain: Eukaryota
- Clade: Sar
- Clade: Stramenopiles
- Division: Ochrophyta
- Clade: Bacillariophyta
- Class: Fragilariophyceae
- Order: Tabellariales
- Family: Tabellariaceae
- Genus: Asterionella
- Species: A. formosa

Binomial name
- Asterionella formosa Hassall, 1850

Synonyms
- Asterionella gracillima var. formosa (Hassall) Wislouch 1921

= Asterionella formosa =

Species of single-celled organism

Asterionella formosa is a species of diatom belonging to the family Fragilariaceae.

It has cosmopolitan distribution.

== Taxonomy ==
Asterionella formosa is the type species of its genus, Asterionella.

=== Etymology ===
The species name "formosa" is derived from the Latin adjective for "beautiful", or "handsome".

== Description ==
Asterionella formosa ranges from 45–68 micrometres (0.0018–0.0027 in) in length and 1.1–4.5 μm in width. Asterionella formosa has valves (siliceous plate that makes up a half of a diatom cell) that are long and narrow, with capitate (enlarged and rounded) apices (tips) unequal in size. The larger apex is known as the footpole. A. formosa has a very narrow sternum (thickened, longitudinal section of the silica valve) and irregularly spaced striae (rows of pores on the valve surface), slightly offset from one another at the sternum. Some A. formosa have irregularly spaced marginal spines between striae. At each end, there is a porefield (area of pores with a different pattern). Rimoportulas (round apertures) have been observed to occur at either or both ends of the valve.

Within each cell is a nucleus at their center and 6–8 golden-brown chromatophores.

Asterionella formosa colonies consist of cells joined at their valve faces' footpoles by mucilage pads. Their colonies consist of 8–20 cells and take on a spiral, star-like shape. They may also occur in a closed ring shape, but this is rare.

== Habitat and distribution ==
Asterionella formosa is common in mesotrophic and eutrophic lakes and slow-moving river plankton around the world, and is especially common in the northern hemisphere. It has become increasingly common in oligotrophic (low-nutrient) mountainous lakes.

== Ecology ==
Asterionella formosa colonies may be colonized by small, sessile (non-mobile) choanoflagellates, or infested by Zygorhizidium planktonicum, a parasitic chytrid fungus. To prevent the fungus from spreading, affected cells in the colony usually induce cell death.

A. formosa laboratory models have been observed to have dynamic microbiomes with many bacterial species, mostly from the phyla Proteobacteria and Bacteroidetes. Most of the bacteria were heterotrophic and more than half could metabolize glycolate.

=== Changes in population ===
When the amount of reactive nitrogen increases in a body of oligotrophic water, diatom populations increase as well. Such increases in A. formosa populations have been used by North American researchers to determine whether a nitrogen disposition rate in a given lake can cause significant ecological effects. Another study found that A. formosa population changes follow climate-warming-related changes, such as: longer open water periods (as opposed to frozen), changed lake mixing regimes, and changed lake thermal properties.
