= Poerua River (Grey District) =

- Location of the Poerua River

Location
- Country: New Zealand
- Region: West Coast
- District: Grey District

Physical characteristics
- Source: Lake Poerua
  - coordinates: 42.6835°S 171.5173°E
  - elevation: 130 metres (430 ft)
- Mouth: Crooked River
  - coordinates: 42.6267°S 171.5210°E
  - elevation: 110 metres (360 ft)
- Length: 8.2 kilometres (5.1 mi)

Basin features
- Progression: Crooked River→ Lake Brunner→ Arnold River→ Grey River / Māwheranui→ Tasman Sea

Poerua River is a river in the Grey District in the West Coast region of New Zealand's South Island. It flows around the base of Mount Te Kinga from Lake Poerua into the Crooked River, which leads to Lake Brunner.
