= Lake Brunner =

Lake in the South Island of New Zealand

- Kōtuku Moana
- Kōtukuwhakaoka (Māori)
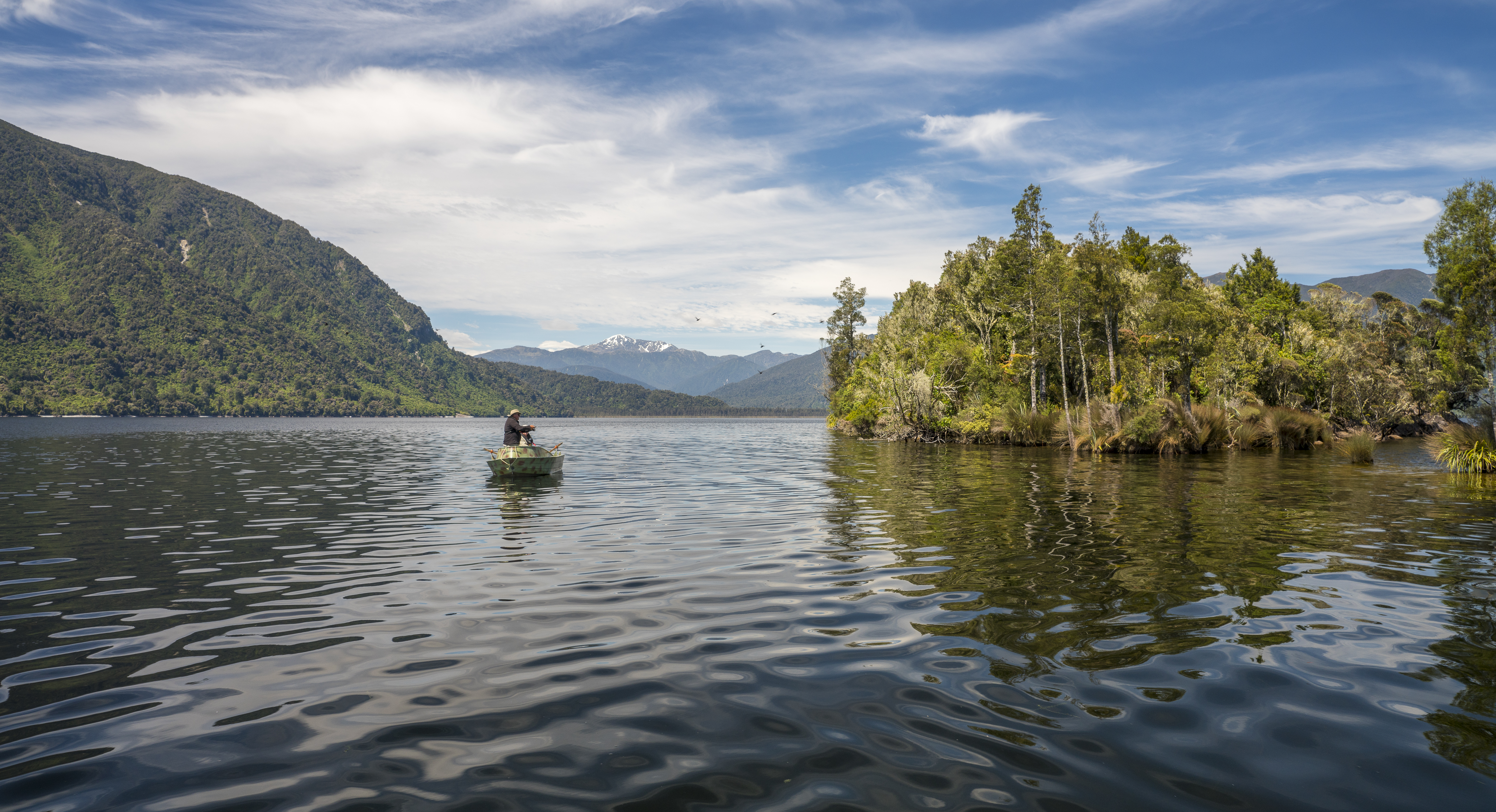
- Fishing on Lake Brunner

- Lake Brunner in New Zealand
- Interactive map of Lake Brunner
- Location: Grey District, West Coast Region, South Island
- Coordinates: 42°37′S 171°27′E
- Etymology: Named afterThomas Brunner; the Māori name translates as 'sea of herons'
- Primary outflows: Arnold River
- Basin countries: New Zealand
- Surface area: 40 km^{2} (15 sq mi)
- Max. depth: 109 m (358 ft)
- Settlements: Moana

Lake Brunner (Māori: Kōtuku Moana or Kōtukuwhakaoka) is the largest lake in the West Coast Region of New Zealand, located 31 km (19 mi) southeast of Greymouth. The main settlement, Moana, is on its northern shore. It is an important settlement and waystation for local Māori. The first Europeans in the area were loggers, and sawmills were an important early industry. Being several kilometres inland from the coast road (State Highway 6), it is less frequently visited by tourists than many of the West Coast's scenic highlights, but it is becoming increasingly popular, in part due to its reputation for fishing.

== Geography ==
Lake Brunner is the largest lake in the West Coast region, 10 km (6.2 mi) across with an area of 4061 ha, just over 40 km^{2} (15 sq mi). The outlet of the lake is the Arnold River, a tributary of the Grey River / Māwheranui, next to the largest settlement of Moana, on the north shore of the lake. The largest rivers feeding into Lake Brunner are the Crooked River from the east, the Orangipuku River and Bruce Creek from the south at Swan Bay, and the Eastern Hohonu River from the west at Hohonu Spit. It is 31 km southwest of Greymouth, at an altitude of 76 m. Two small islands in Pah Bay near the mouth of the Crooked River are known as the Refuge Islands (Takataka and Takatakaiti).

The lake is normally reached by heading south from State Highway 7 at Stillwater, or north from Jacksons on State Highway 73. A smaller road connects Kumara and Inchbonnie via the lake's southern shore. Most of the lake shore is only accessible by boat; the only settlements are Moana, Ruru, Te Kinga, and Mitchells. Bain Bay can be reached by a walking track from Mitchells, but a damaged bridge was removed in January 2021 and the track is currently closed.

Lake Brunner was created in the last ice age by a spur of the Taramakau Glacier, which split from the main glacier and flowed north either side of Mount Te Kinga, between it and the Hohonu Range. Both these prominent mountains are made of erosion-resistant granite and granodiorite, cooled magma 100–145 million years old. When the glacier receded about 11,000 years ago, it left behind moraines which impeded the flow of rivers to the sea and filled the gouged-out glacial valley; the large blocks of rock it dropped, known as glacial erratics, can still be found in the surrounding bush. At this point, the lake would have been larger and deeper than today, with several outflows, but the Arnold River eventually became the main one, cutting through the moraine ridges to drain the lake to its present level. The same process of moraine deposition and glacial retreat created nearby Kangaroo Lake, Lady Lake, and Lake Haupiri.

To the south of the lake, linking it to the Taramakau River valley, is a 1,200 acres (490 ha) stretch of flat land known in the 1860s as the "Natural Paddock" or "Bruce's Paddock". The term "paddock" referred on the Coast to any treeless expanse, and Natural Paddock was mostly pakihi swamp.

The lake is large enough that it can be subject to severe weather, including a powerful easterly wind known as the "Brucer", which blows up the valley from Inchbonnie, once 6,000 acres (2,400 ha) belonging to Thomas Bruce (1831–1908) who began farming there in 1872.

Lake Brunner has a maximum depth of 109 m, but local stories claimed that the lake was bottomless, or that it was connected with the sea and rose and fell with the tides. A naval survey after WWII established its deepest part, near the Takataka islands by the mouth of the Crooked River, at around 335 feet. Like Lake Kaniere, the other large glacial lake on the West Coast, Lake Brunner is in a deeply-scoured basin and drops off quite rapidly around most of its shoreline. Its water is stained the colour of tea, sometimes appearing almost black, by the tannins—organic and humic acids—leached into its tributaries: a consequence of high rainfall in a catchment that is almost entirely forested. The lake waters are acidic, with a low pH and low oxygen levels compared to lakes on the eastern side of the main divide. The soils in its catchment are derived from greywacke, granite, and schist, and are low in nutrients, but unlike many other West Coast glacial lake, Lake Brunner has significant alluvial soils on its margin. The lake has less thermal stratification than other West Coast lakes, as it is subject to strong winds, and its level fluctuates significantly following heavy rain, sometimes covering the jetty at Moana.

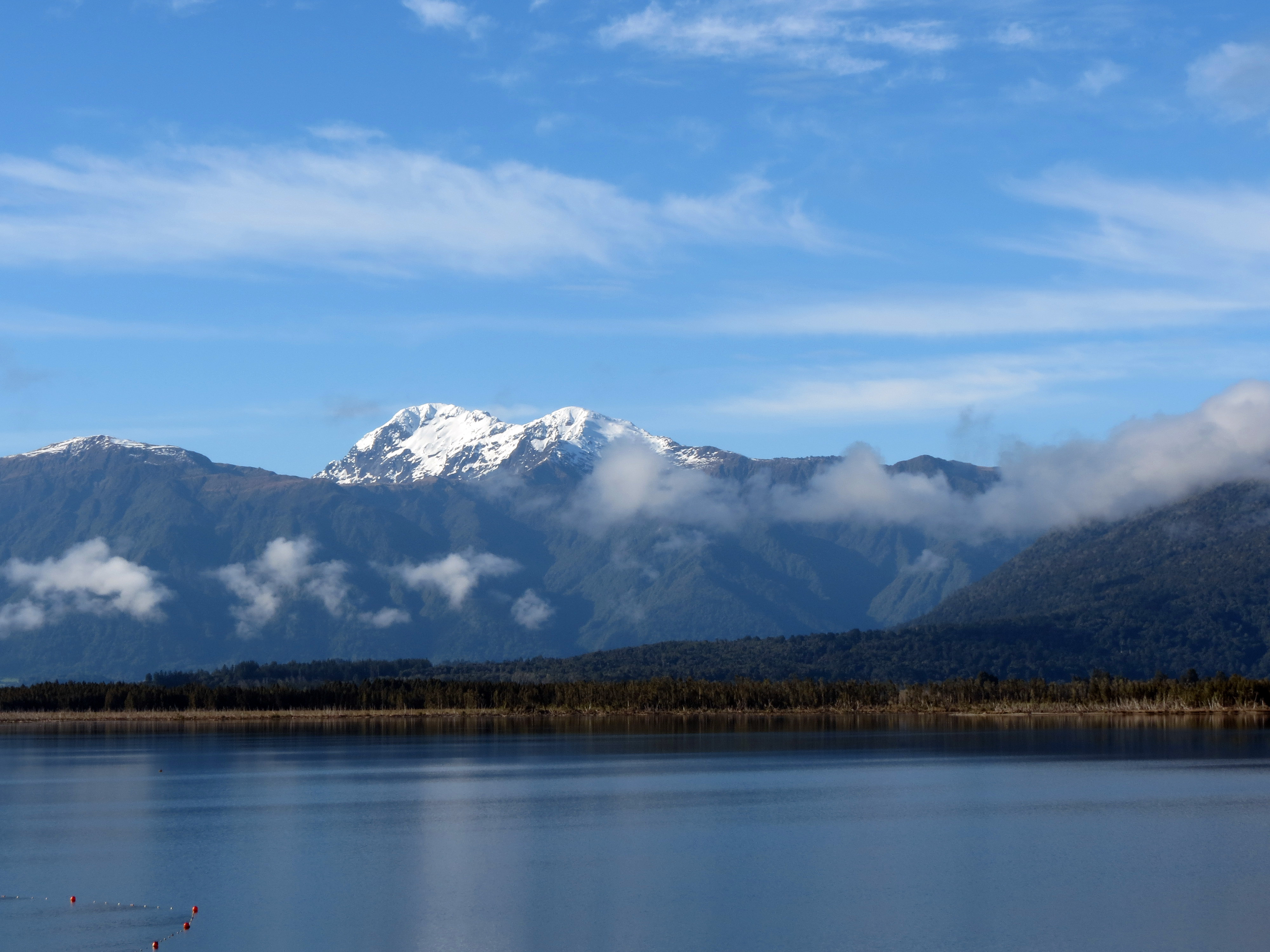
Mount Alexander

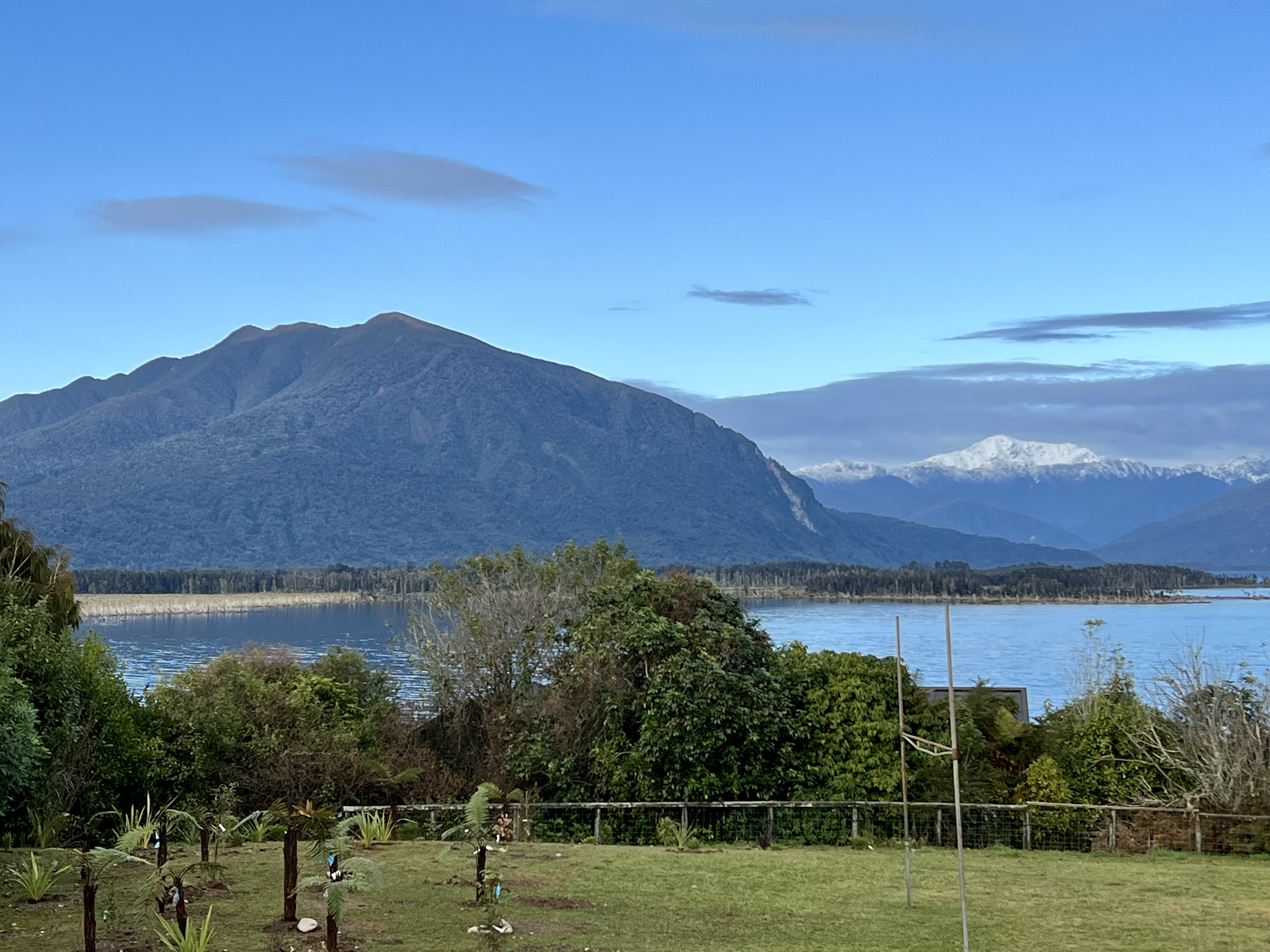
Mount Te Kinga from Moana

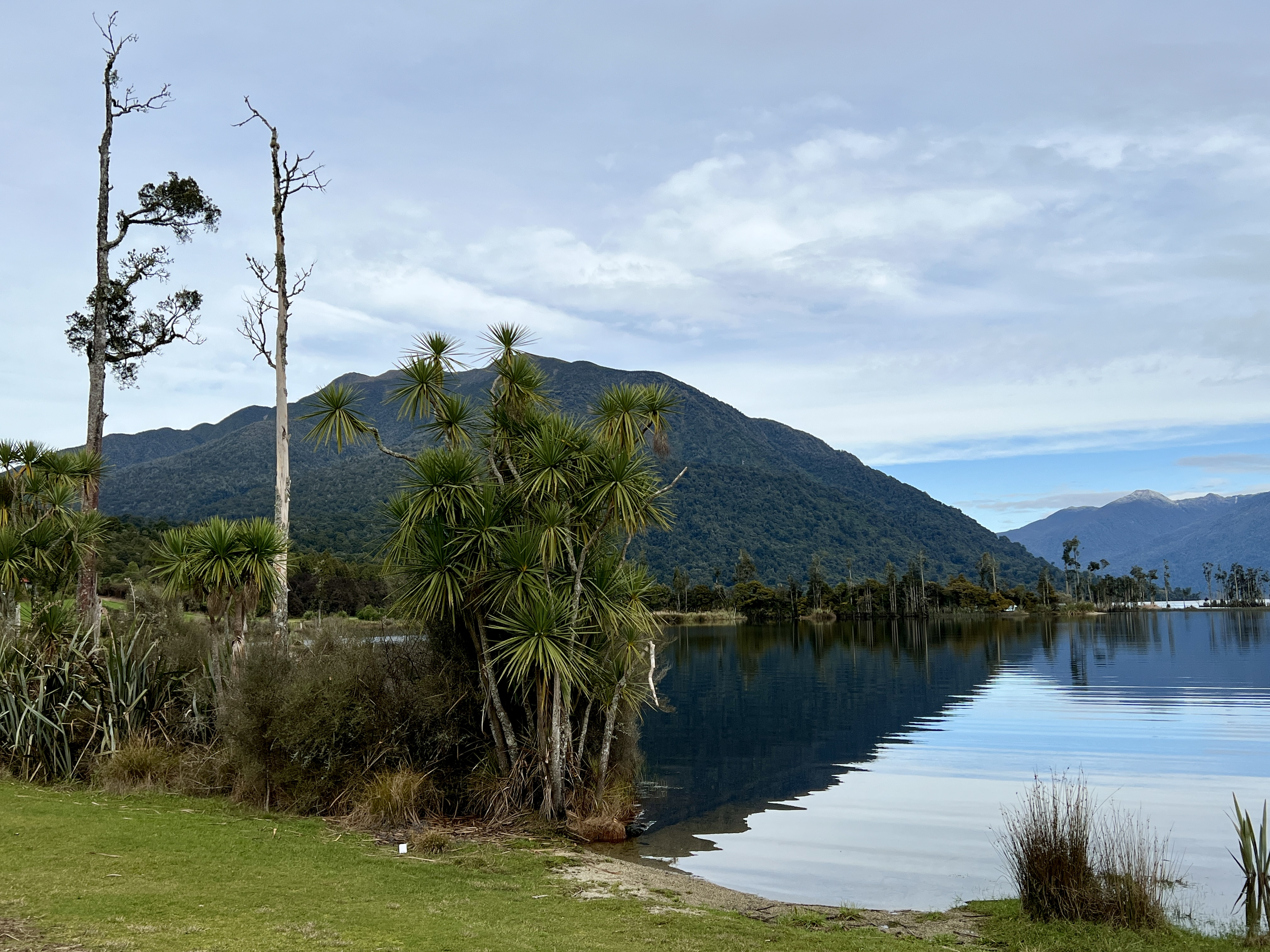
Mount Te Kinga from Cashmere Bay

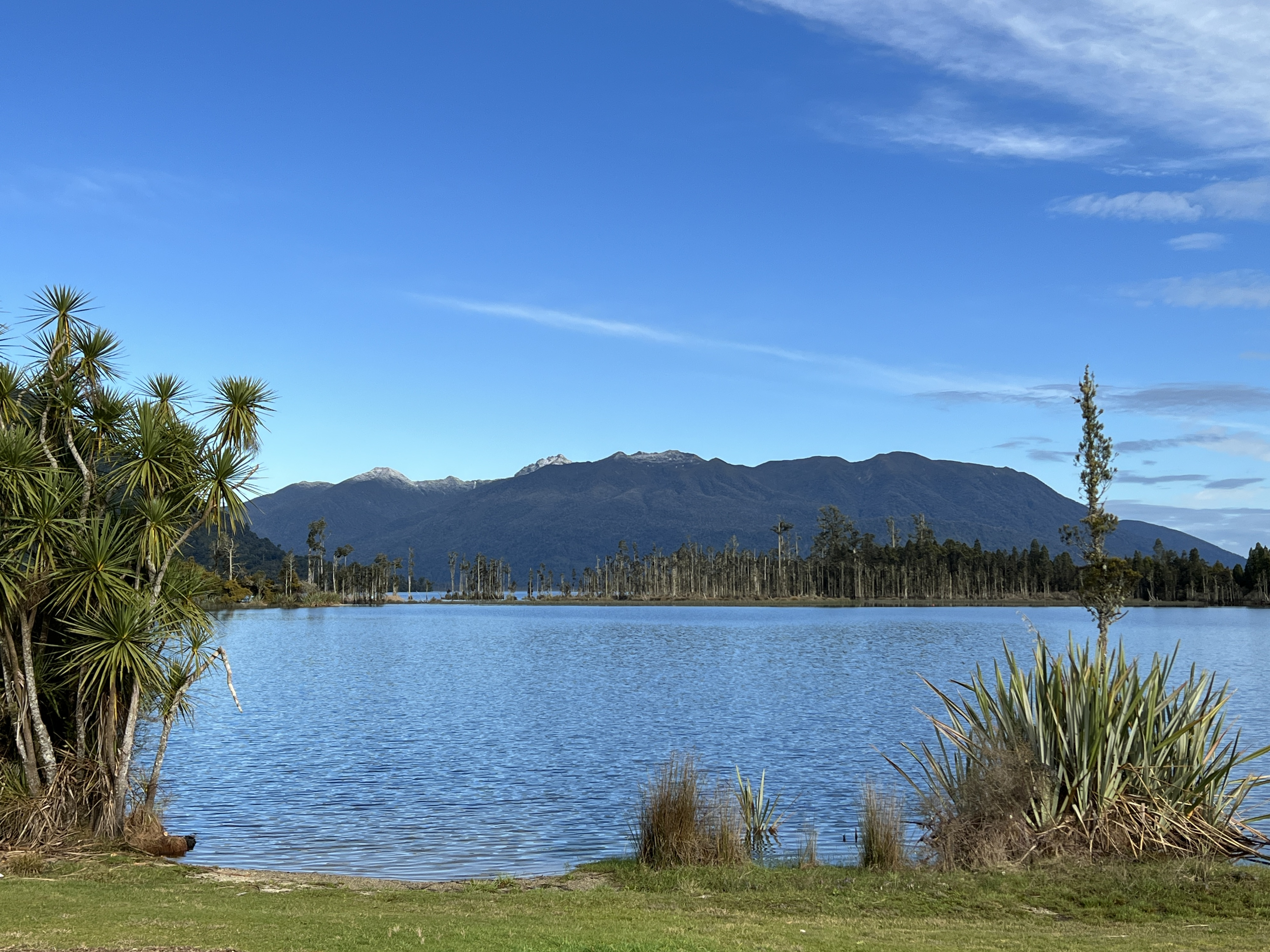
Hohonu Peaks from Cashmere Bay

== Name ==
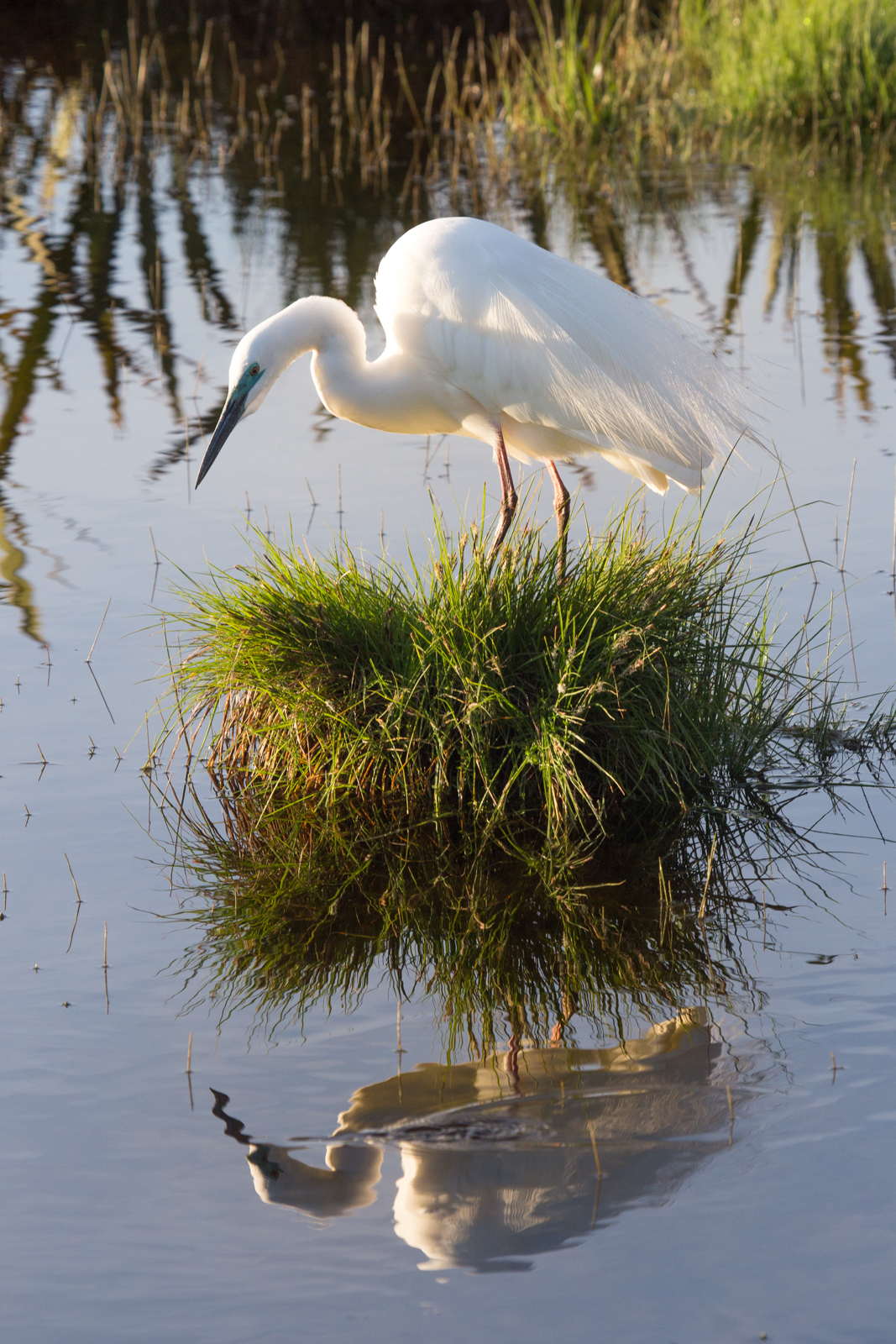
Kōtuku (Ardea alba modesta)

Although the Māori name for the lake is often given as just "Moana", two names for the lake are recorded. The first, Kōtuku moana, translates as "sea of herons", referencing the white heron (Ardea alba modesta), known to Māori as kōtuku. In New Zealand kōtuku have a population of roughly 200 at any one time, breeding only at Ōkārito on the West Coast, and are symbols of beauty and rarity in Māori culture.

The second name, Kōtukuwhakaoka, is shared with the Arnold River, and is the name of a Māori chief (Rangatira) from the North Island who came upon the lake after following the river upstream. According to Māori mythology, the chief was attacked and killed by a taniwha which lived in the lake, which later became one of the two islands in the lake after it was killed by the chief's son. The name was variously rendered as Kotukuwakaho and Kotuku-kaoka; Brunner spelled it "Kotu-urakaoka" in the proclamation that in 1853 defined the boundaries of the province.

In the Ngāi Tahu Claims Settlement Act 1998, the lake's name was rendered slightly differently, as Kōtuku-Whakaoho. The origin was traced to a husband and wife, Kōtuka and Māwhera, who gave their names to the lake and the Grey River respectively.

The English name "Lake Brunner" was chosen by John Rochfort to honour the 19th century explorer Thomas Brunner, who was the first European to visit the lake.

== History ==
=== Māori occupation ===
The lake was a significant resting point for Māori groups travelling east or west over the Hurunui saddle. They would stop at the lake to fish for eels and kākahi (freshwater mussels), catch birds, or process pounamu. The green stone only found on the West Coast was a precious commodity to Māori all through Aotearoa, and a significant trade good for the Poutini Ngāi Tahu, the hapū who lived west of the Southern Alps / Tiritiri-o-te-moana. Fortified settlements were built at Pah Point on the eastern side of the lake, and on nearby Takataka Island, with terraces, stockades, and gardens. There is evidence of pounamu working taking place at Pah Point and Takakataka Island at the lake, and Kotuku up the Arnold Valley.

=== Early exploration ===
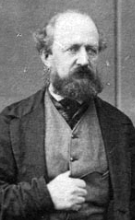
Thomas Brunner

Brunner, who in the 1840s had undertaken several journeys to and from the West Coast alone or in the company of Charles Heaphy—but always led, provisioned, and hosted by local Māori—spent Christmas of 1847 at the settlement of Māwhera at the mouth of the Māwheranui (Grey River). The resident Poutini Ngāi Tahu told him about a lake upriver, and Brunner was keen to explore the area inland. After a three-week delay while his guides went on a fishing trip, and ten days of provisioning, Brunner and twenty Māori set off upriver in four canoes on 26 January 1848. Heading up what came to be known as the Arnold River, the party reached the lake on 29 January. They camped on Takataka (later known as the Refuge Islands) near the mouth of the Crooked River, where they ate kākahi and raupō root, and Brunner smoked the last of his tobacco. His guides told Brunner there was an overland route across the mountains near the Taramakau River, but the group turned back and headed to the Grey and the Inangahua Valley.

In October 1857 Leonard Harper, led by Ihaia Tainui and three other Māori, left Canterbury and crossed the mountains at the Hurunui Saddle, known afterwards as the Harper Pass. Heading down the Taramakau towards the sea, he glimpsed grassy flats and the lake on his right, but did not investigate. In February 1859 surveyor John Rochfort followed the same route down the Taramakau, but after camping below its junction with the Ōtira, east of Mount Turiwhate, he headed north through the low gap that led to the lake. On the shore the party made a canoe from a kahikatea log and crossed the lake, which Rochfort named after Thomas Brunner, and exited by the river he dubbed the "Arnould".

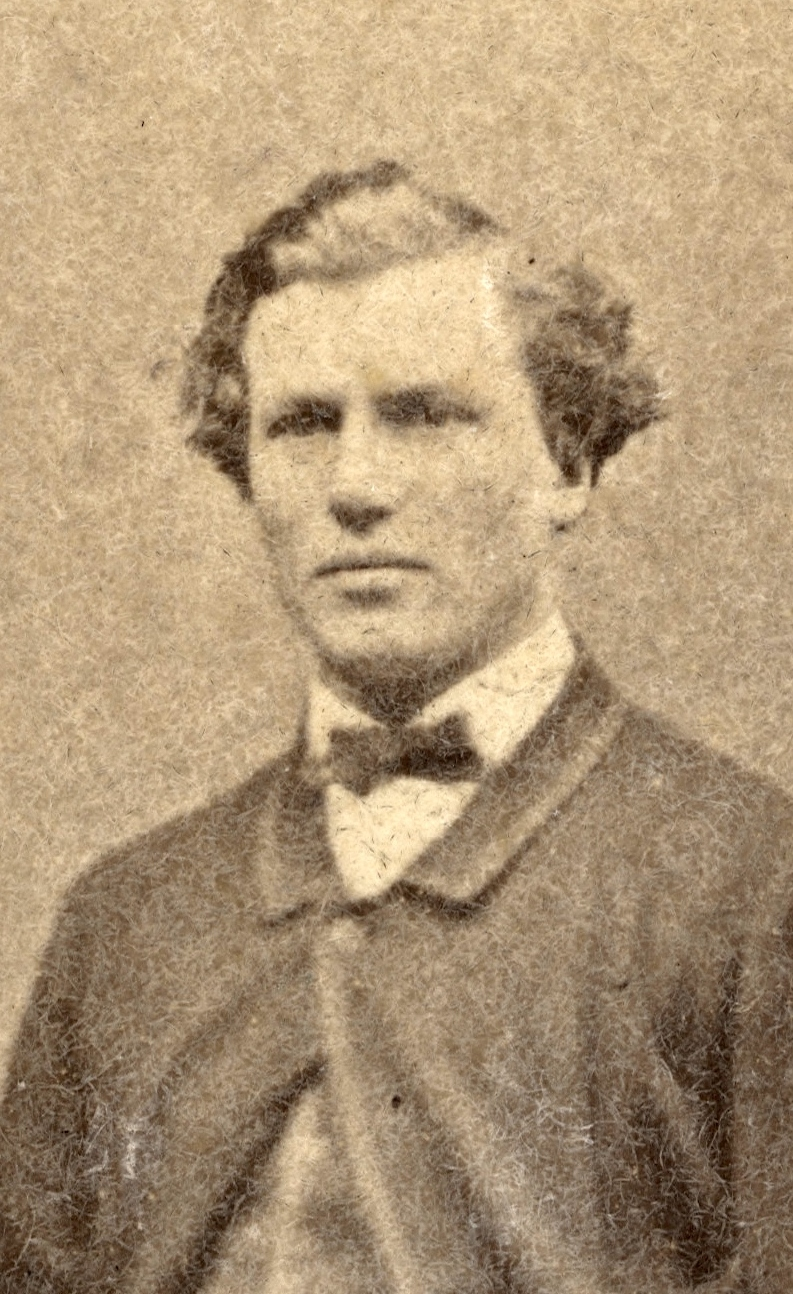
Charlton Howitt

From January to March 1863 young explorer Herbert Charlton Howitt, who previously explored for gold across the Hurunui Saddle, cut a trail over the pass to Lake Brunner. He initially planned to make a trail around the lake shore to the Arnold River as a route to the coast. In April he decided instead to cut a track from the lakeshore over the Hohunu Range to the lower Taramakau, avoiding the dangerous Taramakau Gorge. On 27 June, Howitt and two of his party set off across the lake by canoe to fish for eels and retrieve stores from their camp at the Arnold River outlet, and were never seen again. The canoe, which sat only three inches above the water when laden, was presumably swamped in a storm, and the three men drowned; numerous subsequent searches turned up only his tent and some eel lines at the lake shore.

In December 1865, during the West Coast gold rush, word got around that a group of prospectors, known as the "Kangaroo party", had lodged a claim on land to the north-east of Lake Brunner. Eight hundred men headed to the lake, where they found a ferry boat waiting to take them across the lake at 15 shillings a head, and a well-stocked store on the other side. When no gold was to be found, an angry mob looted and demolished the store and headed back to Greymouth. Flooding in the swamp at the Arnold River outlet marooned 200 of them, who clung to kahikatea trunks without food until the waters receded.

=== Railway construction ===
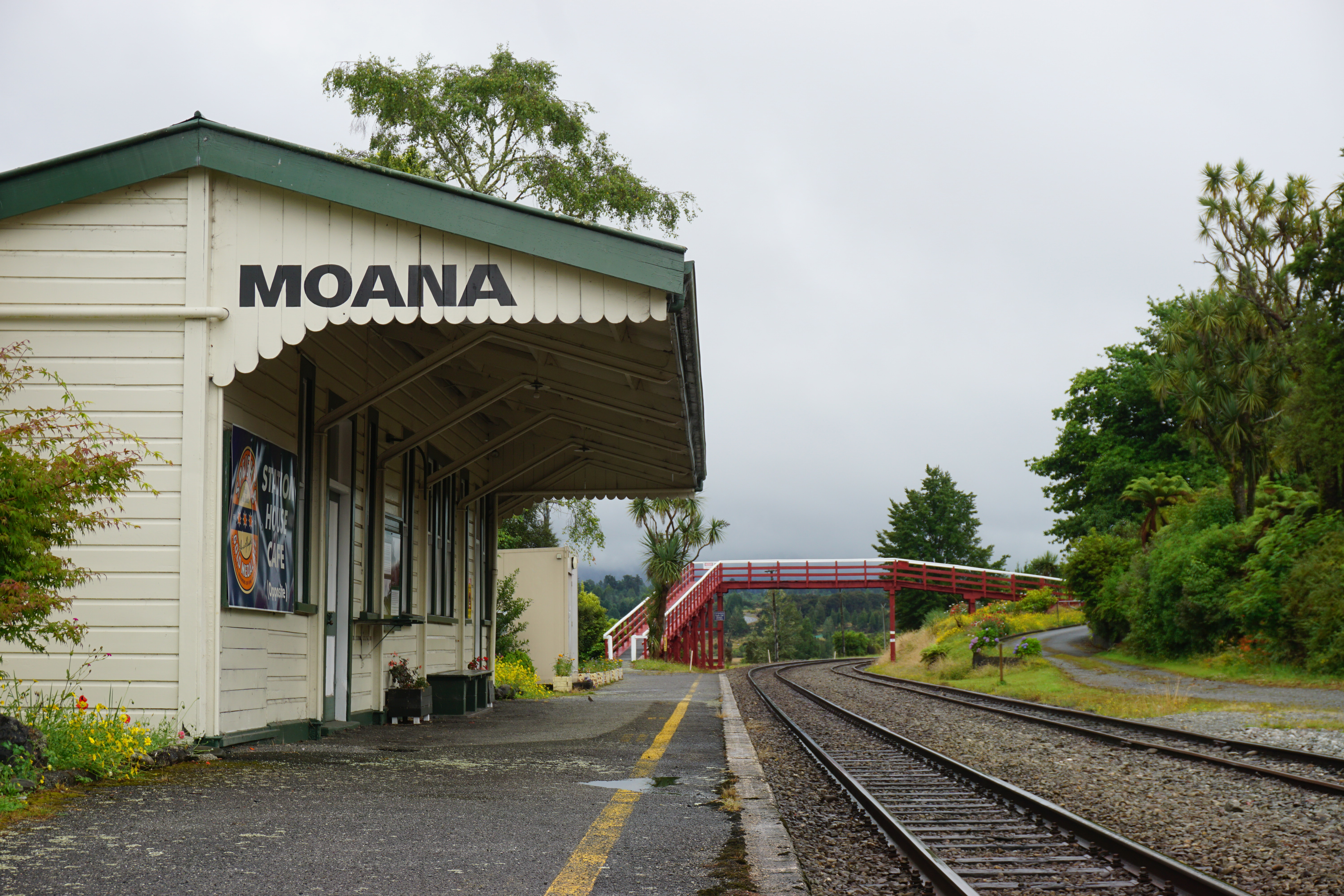
Moana railway station

By 1867 the Canterbury provincial government had built a bush track along the south bank of the Grey and Arnold rivers, and along the south-west shore of the lake to Natural Paddock. The first farmers in the area settled around the Crooked River in 1868–69. In the 1880s a railway linking Greymouth and Christchurch was begun, which opened up the Arnold Valley and Lake Brunner. The route was originally proposed to follow the eastern side of the lake, but Westland MP Richard Seddon, from 1891 Minister of Public Works, insisted that it follow the western shore, closer to his constituency of Kumara. After some wrangling, the railway was laid to the east of the lake, and a road constructed to connect Kumara with the southern lakeshore, from which a steamboat could convey people to a railway station—although this ferry never eventuated. Moana had its own railway station by 1892, and the line continued as far south as Te Kinga, where it hit swampland. Materials were then conveyed by the steam launch Little Tay across the lake and up the Orangipuku River to Inchbonnie, and during 1893 construction continued in both directions up to Rotomanu and down to Jacksons. The link between Stillwater and Ōtira was completed in 1894. The Midland Line connecting Greymouth and Christchurch opened in 1923, after 36 years of construction and the building of the Ōtira Tunnel. The building of the railway created a market for the long-lasting timber of manoao or silver pine (Manoao colensoi), which was used for railway sleepers, telegraph poles, and bridges.

All trains stopped at Moana for water, and the settlement quickly grew: by 1906 it had four shops and a billiard room, and in 1907 a grand hall opened, hosting bachelor dances for the timber workers. The road took longer: by 1896 it had reached from the south from Rotomanu to Bell Hill, with a track to Stillwater, and by 1918 it was possible to drive from Rotumanu to Kotuku and then Greymouth—although the road was only kept navigable by grazing deer and a gate needed to be traversed at Bell Hill.

=== Sawmilling ===
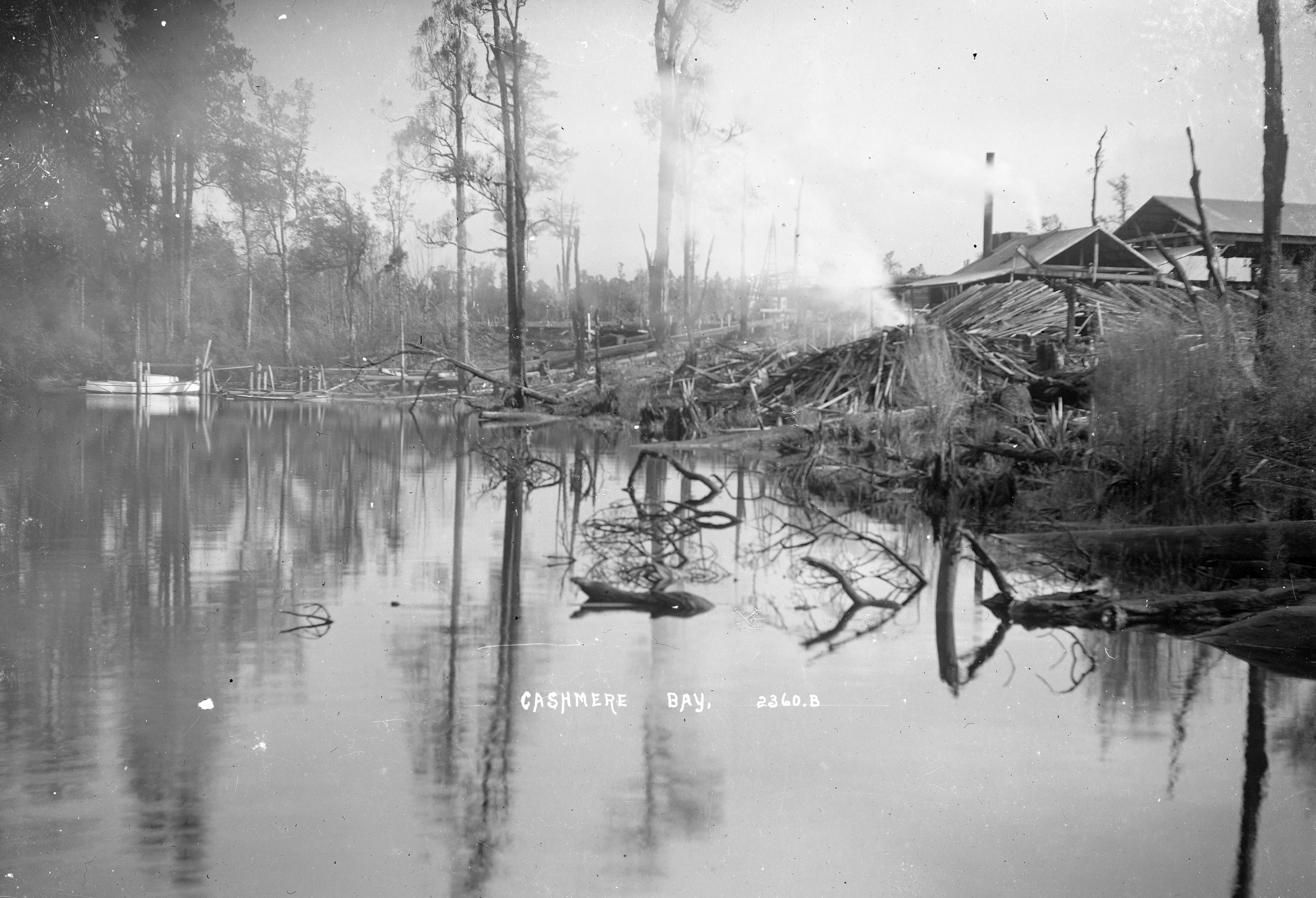
Sawmill at Cashmere Bay, circa 1910

Numerous sawmills sprung up along the railway line; some transported felled trees to the railway with bush trams operating on wooden rails. Other had logging gangs felling trees around the lake and towing them by boat to mills on the lake shore. Nyberg's mill, later the Lake Brunner Sawmilling Company, operated in Ruru. The Moana Sawmill Company, with a log landing near the Arnold River outfall. Stratford and Blair operated a sawmill beside the Moana railway station. In the 1930s trees were felled at Irishman's Landing across the lake and towed by launch, the Monica, to Moana. United Mills operated in Te Kinga, using timber felled in a logging camp across the lake at Bain Bay. Initially they were transported across the lake by the Tiki, a steam launch, and from 1938 to 1963 by the Tikinui, which towed a punt onto which logs that would not float were fastened. When a "Brucer" blew, waves were so high they would break over the Tikinui's wheelhouse (8 feet above lake level); the boat would cast loose its punt and logs and make for shelter, returning to retrieve any floating logs the next day. After native timber forestry had ceased on the West Coast, a business sprang up using divers and chains to salvage logs from the lake bottom for milling. Logs that had sunk to the lake floor a century ago remained perfectly preserved, with axe marks still visible.

In the Great Depression, two thirds of the area's sawmills shut down, and in 1963 the Lake Brunner Sawmilling Company, the first to send logs through the Ōtira Tunnel, closed from lack of suitable timber. The cleared flat land around the lake proved suitable for farming, particularly dairy herds, and from the early 1960s local farms were supplying the Westland Cooperative Dairy Co. in Hokitika. By 1976 twenty percent of the catchment of the lake was farmed and Moana had a population of 84, with most of the buildings being holiday homes.

== Flora ==
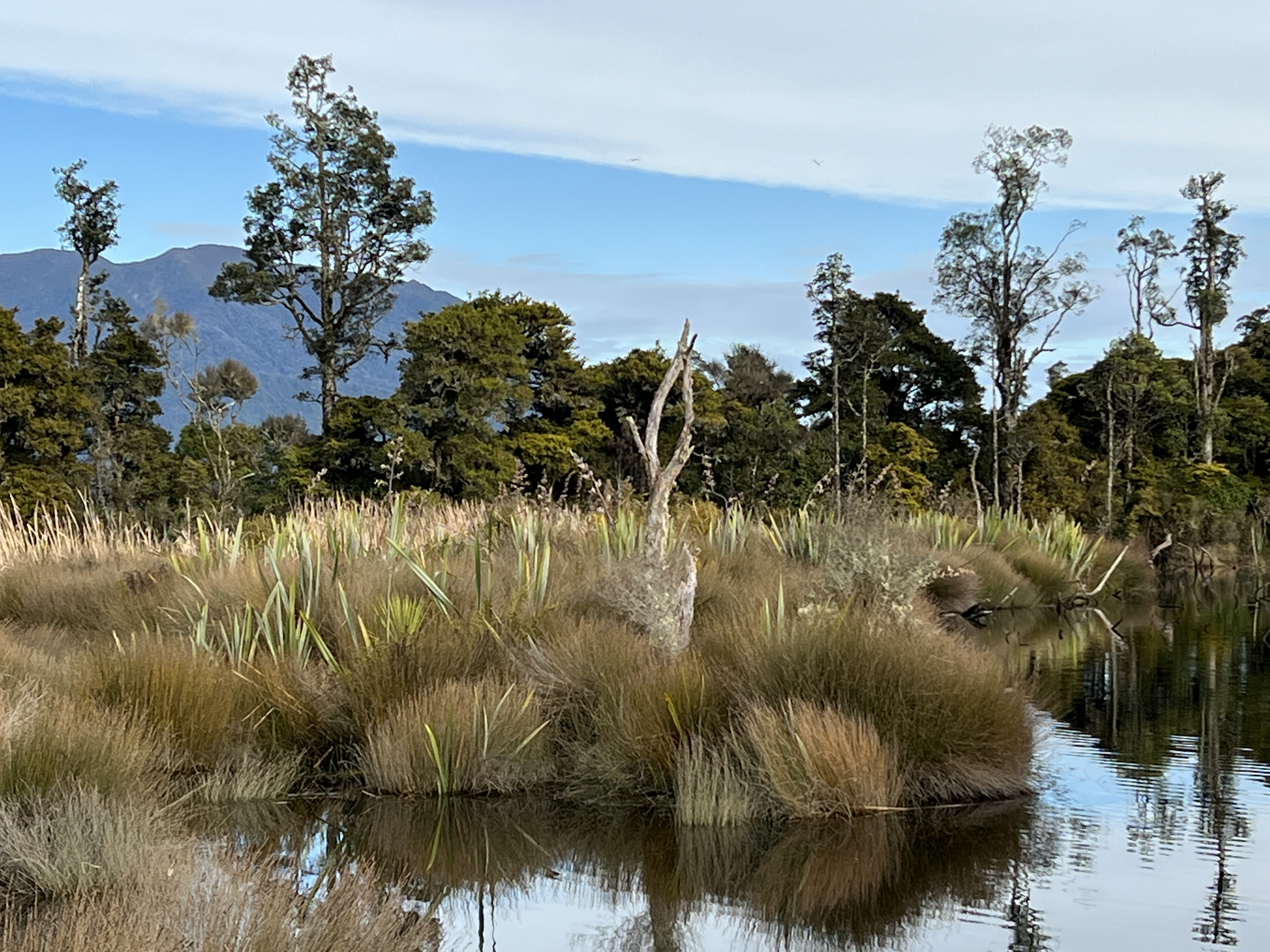
Swamp forest at Cashmere Bay

Lake Brunner is notable in being surrounded by intact native forest, although the flats have been extensively logged while kahikatea (Dacrycarpus dacrydioides) swamp forest is found at many points along the lake shore. Kahikatea is able to tolerate submergence of its roots, and when lake levels are high it is possible to travel by kayak through forests of 30 m trees, one of the few places on the West Coast where this is easily done. The lakeside kahikatea and flax (Phormium tenax) community includes small-leaved divaricating shrubs like mingimingi and Coprosma rhamnoides, and the trees rimu and kamahi.

Much of the forest on the flats and surrounding hills is tall podocarp forest, predominantly kahihatea, rimu (Dacrydium cupressinum), tōtara (Podocarpus totara), and silver pine/manoao (Manoao colensoi), which can reach the lake edge at places like the Hohonu River. The drier forest away from the lake edge is dominated by rimu, mataī (Prumnopitys taxifolia), Hall's tōtara (Podocarpus laetus), and needle-leafed tōtara (P. acutifolius). On the higher slopes the forest is predominantly southern beech (formerly Nothofagus). In the understory can be found wheki-ponga (Dicksonia fibrosa), distinguished by its skirt of dead fronds, marble-leaf (Carpodetus serratus), and the climbing rātā Metrosideros perforata. On the forest floor ferns include crown fern (Lomaria discolor), hanging spleenwort (Asplenium flaccidum) growing as an epiphyte on tree trunks, Prince of Wales feathers fern (Leptopteris superba), and filmy ferns (Hymenophyllum). These are most easily observed from the Rakaitane Walk.

Māori occupied both Takataka (Refuge Island) and Takatakaiti until about 1850, clearing all the forest and leaving only bracken fern (Pteridium esculentum). Because the islands have no deer or possums, vegetation was able to regenerate undisturbed. Takataka was declared a Scenic Reserve in 1944. A vegetation survey in 1978 found young podocarp forest on the southern part of Takataka and scrub elsewhere; this has since become low forest, with only a small patch of bracken remaining.

The phytoplankton of Lake Brunner is composed mostly of diatoms, Chlorophyceae, and Chrysophyceae. It contains species of Staurastrum, Volvox, and Asterionella (specifically Asterionella formosa) that are common in lakes on the East Coast, but rare in the West.

== Fauna ==
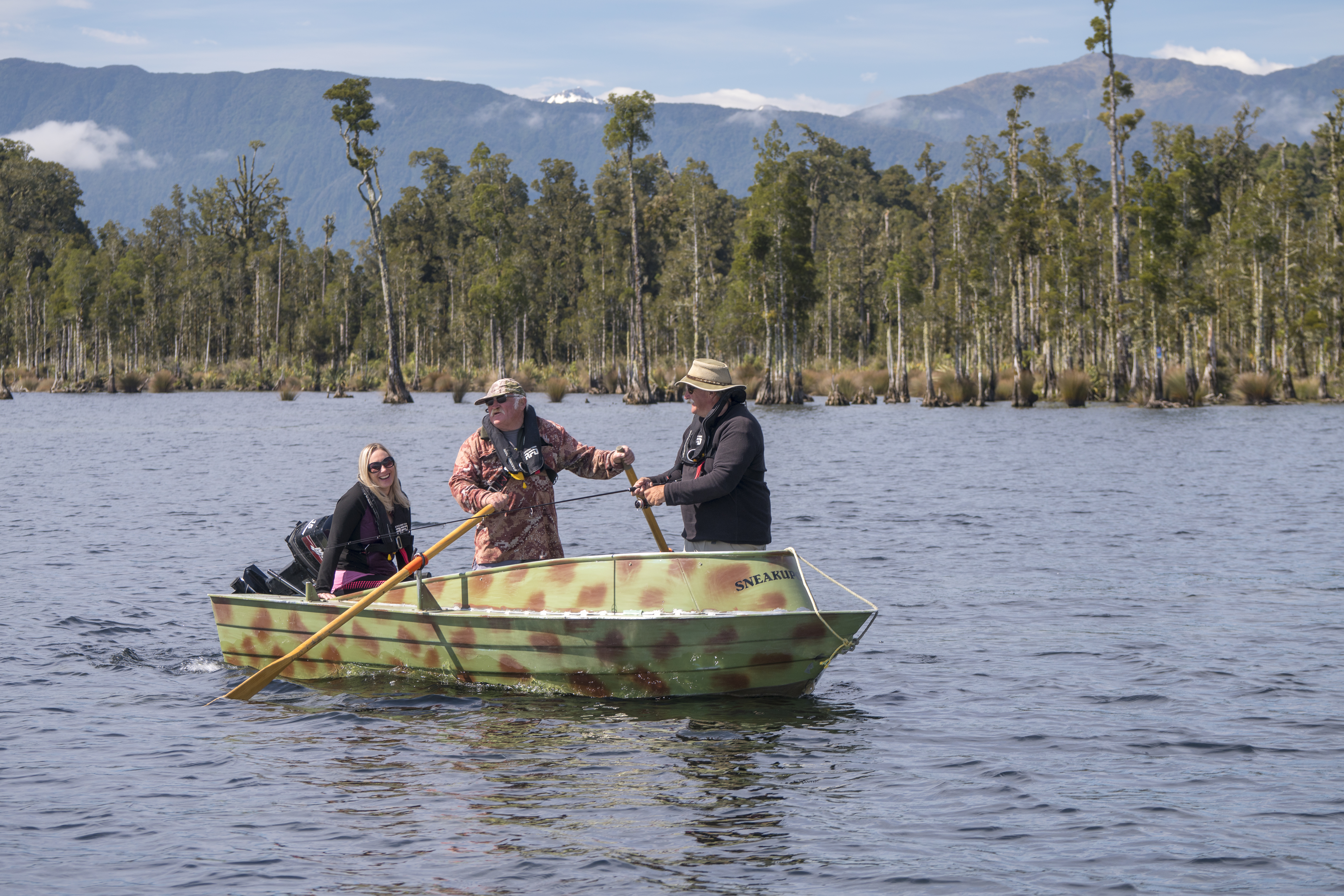
Fishing on Lake Brunner

Both the white-faced heron (Egretta novaehollandiae) and the white heron / kōtuku (Ardea modesta) occur at Lake Brunner, and waterfowl include black swans (Cygnus atratus), Canada geese (Branta canadensis), scaup (Aythya novaeseelandiae), paradise shelducks (Tadorna variegata), grey ducks (Anas superciliosa), mallards (A. platyrhynchos), and coots (Fulica atra). Little shags (Phalacrocorax melanoleucos) and black shags (P. carbo) can both be found. Birdlife is most common and easily observed in Iveagh Bay. Fernbirds can often be seen in the mixed kahikatea/flax vegetation on the track to Bain Bay.

The New Zealand freshwater mussel (Hyridella menziesi) is found in Lake Brunner. It is the only South Island lake with the calanoid copepod Boeckella delicata.

=== Fishing ===
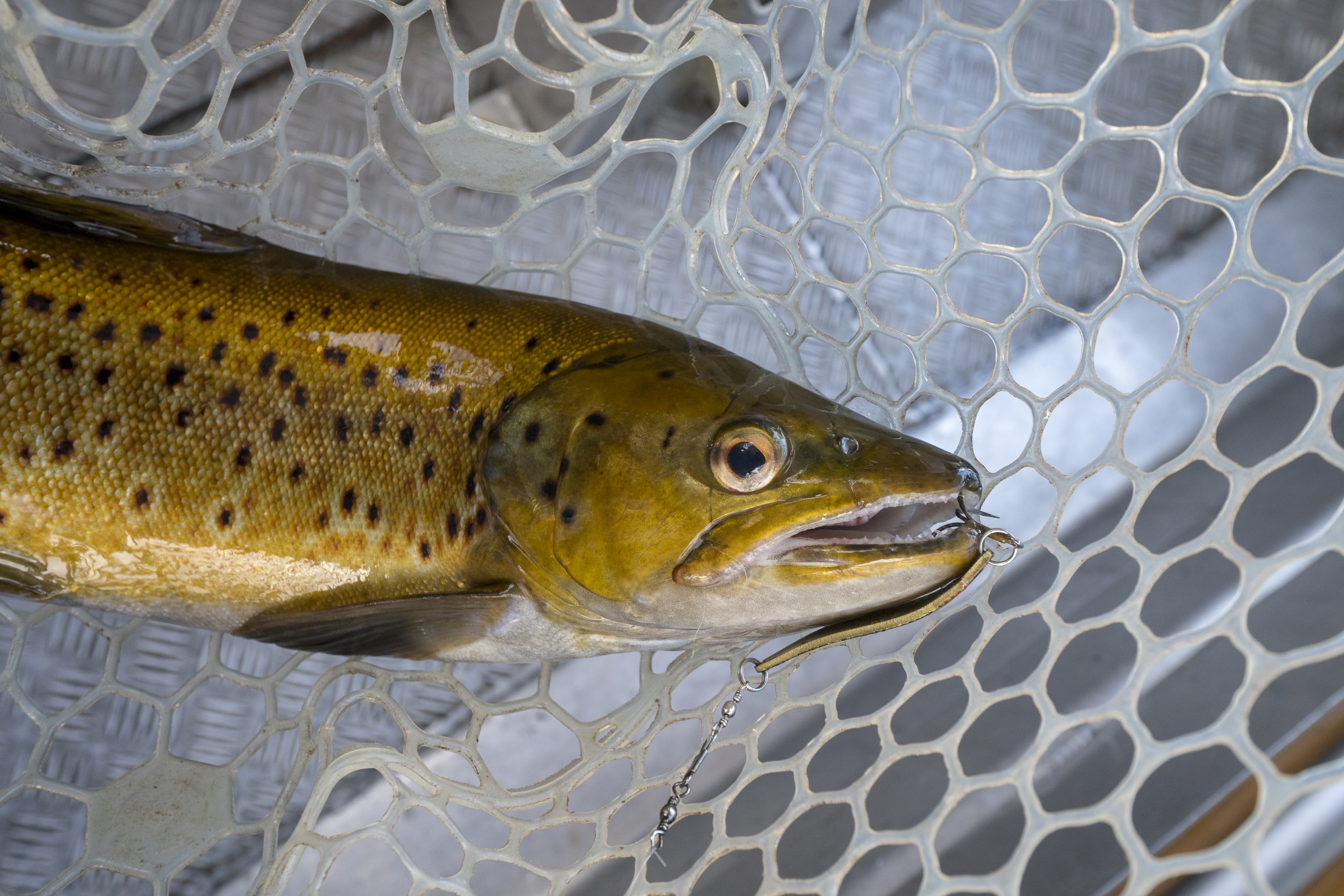
Brown trout (Salmo trutta)

Fishing for eels at the lake was popular amongst both Māori and European settlers. Today, though, Lake Brunner is one of New Zealand's most significant brown trout (Salmo trutta) fisheries, and is often referred to as "the place where fish die of old age". There are also small numbers of rainbow trout (Oncorhynchus mykiss). Rainbow trout originate in North America, and brown trout are a European game fish introduced throughout New Zealand following the establishment of a hatchery in Tasmania in the 1860s. In 1891, 15,000 young trout were transported from Greymouth by rail to stock the lake. Smelt (Retropinna retropinna) were also liberated in Lake Brunner to serve as food for trout, but did not establish.

Trout are caught from boats in the shallow lake waters, especially Iveagh Bay, or by fly fishing in the Orangaipuku, Hohonum or Crooked Rivers and the mouth of the Arnold River. The fish are abundant but not large—only 1 to 1.5 kg. The temperate West Coast climate means trout can still be caught in winter, when in the cooler eastern South Island lakes they are much less active.

== Recreation ==
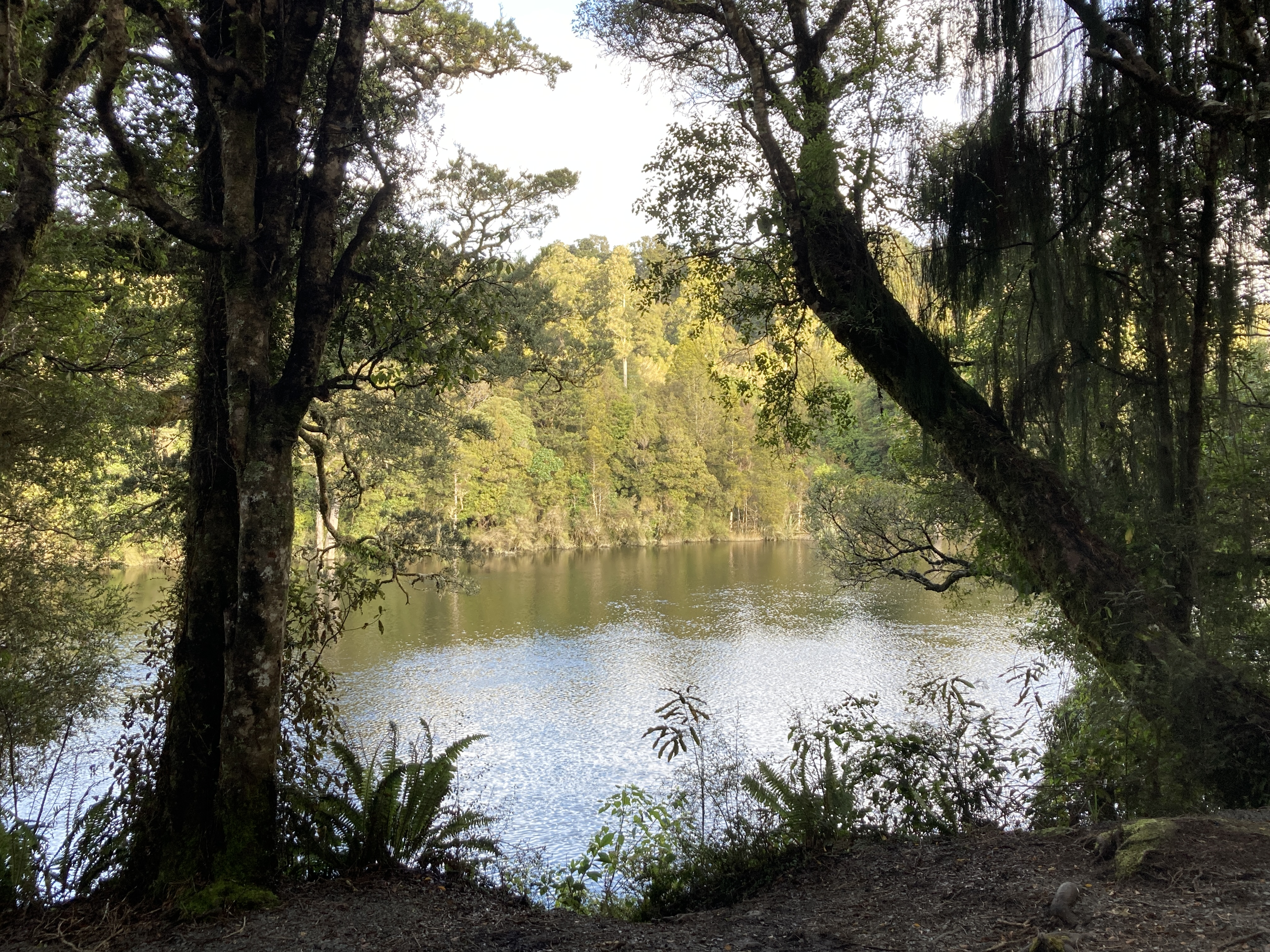
Rakaitane Walk beside the Arnold River

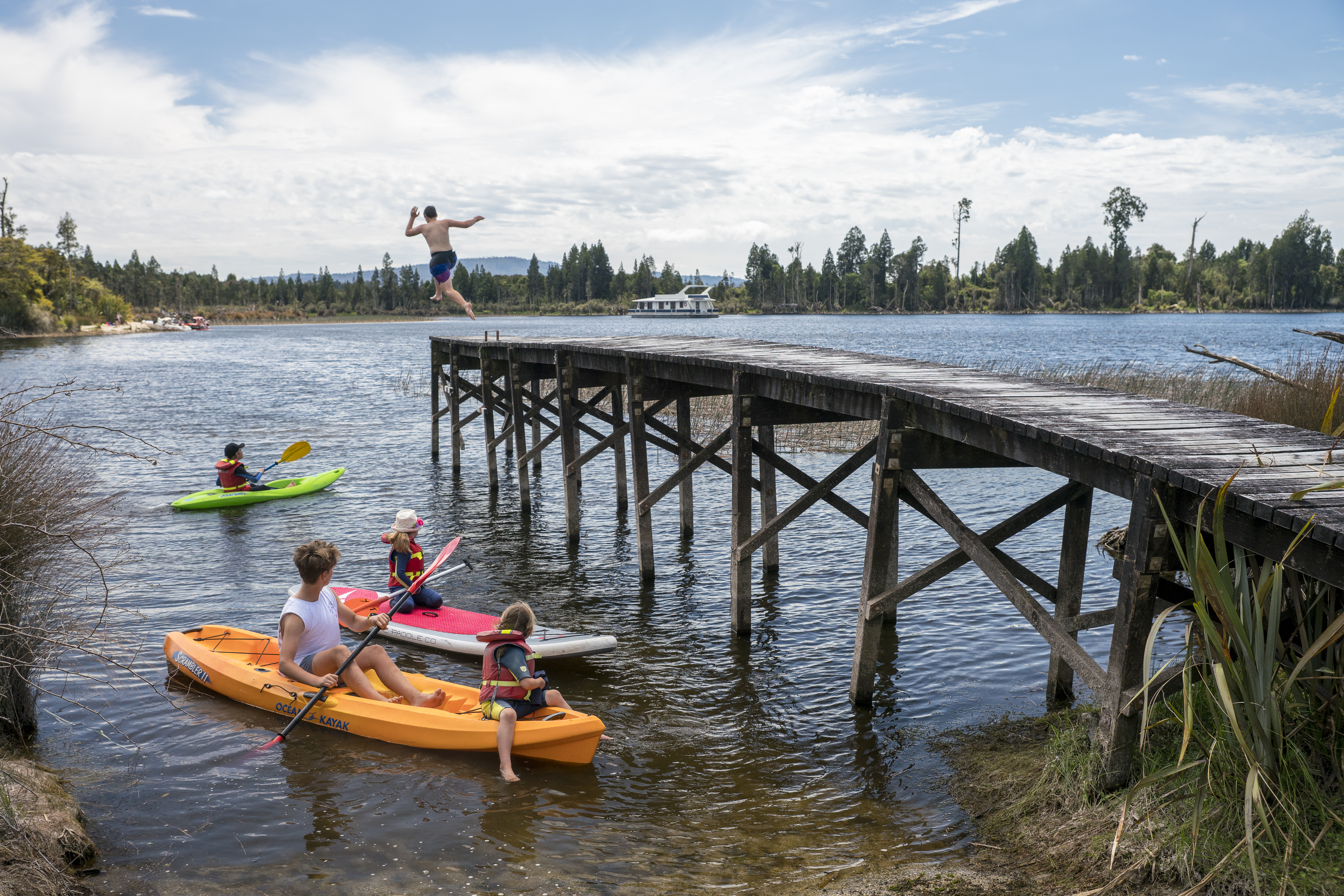
Kayaking at Cashmere Bay

The lake was early on recognised for its natural beauty, and in 1887 a tourist account celebrated the impending railway, and the lake "soon will be dotted with handsome villas, the summer residence of the aristocracy of Greymouth and the surrounding districts." Sailing was a popular early activity, and in 1892 the first regatta attracted a trainload of 350 sightseers. The growth of tourism led to the opening in 1931 of the 22-room Grand Chateau Moana, which went bankrupt the following year. A motor camp was built in 1959 in Moana, and a jetty, slipway, and car park in 1961. In the 1960s building a holiday home or "bach" at Moana or Iveagh Bay became popular with Christchurch or Greymouth families. There are boat launching ramps at Moana, Te Kinga (with lake access at Cashmere Bay), and Mitchells. Iveagh Bay was once a backwater, but has rapidly-increasing numbers of expensive holiday mansions.

Swimming, kayaking, waterskiing, and jetskis are all popular at Lake Brunner. Because the lake is fed from surrounding forest, not snow, it can reach pleasant temperatures in summer. The lake is surrounded by bush walks: Carew Falls and Bain Bay (currently closed) from Mitchells, the Mount Te Kinga / Aora o Te Kinga Track from Iveagh Bay, and the short Valenski Walk and Rakaitane Track from Moana.

== Water quality ==
Lake Brunner is recognised for its ecological value and importance to the tangata whenua, to tourism and to fisheries. The lake is classified as oligotrophic, meaning that it has naturally low levels of nutrients, low levels of algae and the water is of high quality. Regular monitoring of water quality in Lake Brunner began in the early 1990s. A report in 2006 identified declining water quality, and this was followed in 2010 by an update describing increasing nutrient levels in surface water, increasing chlorophyll (an indicator of biomass of algae), and a decrease in water clarity. The report suggested that intensification of agriculture in the catchment area could be the cause of the deterioration.

There are 25 dairy farms in the catchment area of Lake Brunner. Dairy farmers responded to the concerns about deteriorating water quality by investing in riparian planting, improved fencing of waterways and bridging of streams on their properties. Many also invested in improved effluent treatment systems. A community group, the Lake Brunner Community Catchment Care Group, was formed to support environmental initiatives include riparian planting around waterways on farms and on public land. The group comprised around 60 individuals, and had support from regional and local councils, NZ Landcare Trust, Te Rūnanga o Ngāti Waewae, Fish & Game, the Brunner Residents Association, and representatives of the dairy industry, including Westland Milk Products. In 2016, at the Local Government Excellence Awards, the West Coast Regional Council received a "highly commended" award for its entry: Lake Brunner Water Quality Enhancement Project. By 2021, it was reported that 62 km (39 mi) of fencing had been constructed on farms in the catchment along with 21,000 plants in riparian strips.

Water quality updates are published periodically by the West Coast Regional Council. The December 2021 update reports that the lake is safe for swimming and recreation, and has remained in an oligotrophic (low nutrient) state. The levels of phosphorus are graded A on the National Objectives Framework issued under the National Policy Statement for Freshwater Management, and are sufficiently low that growth of algae is inhibited. Levels of total nitrogen and lakebed dissolved oxygen are graded B on the same scale.

== Gallery ==
Lake Brunner impressions

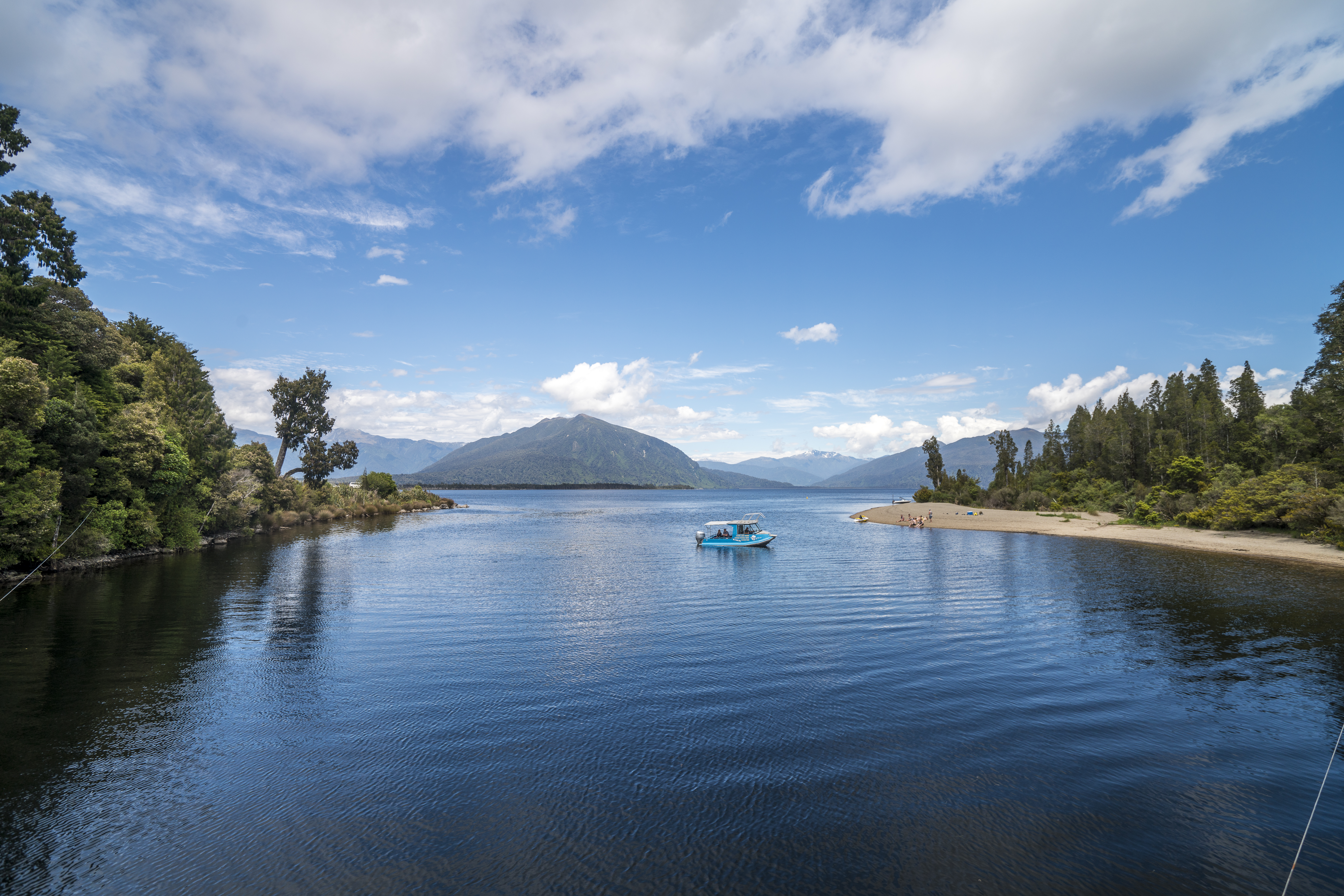

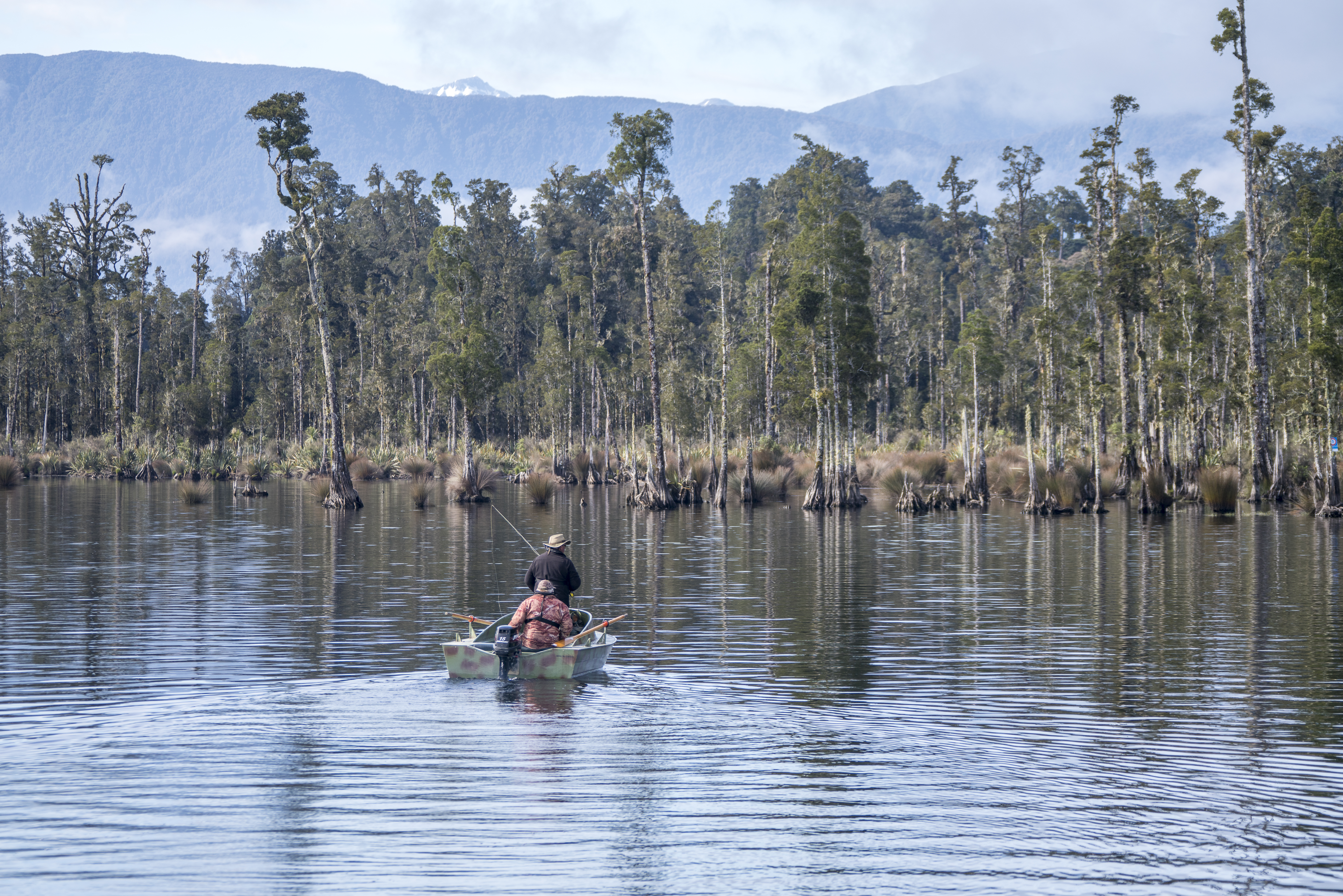

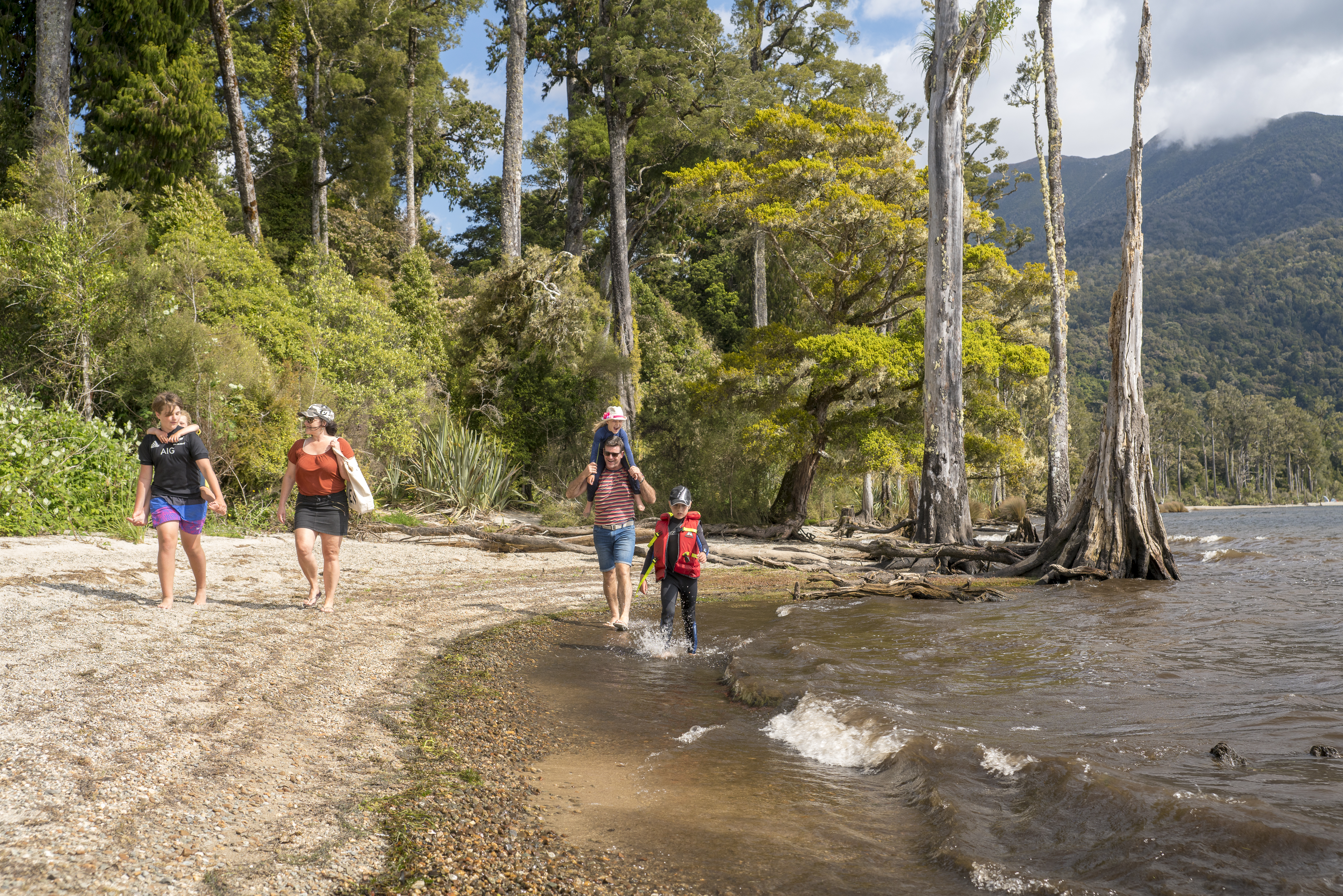

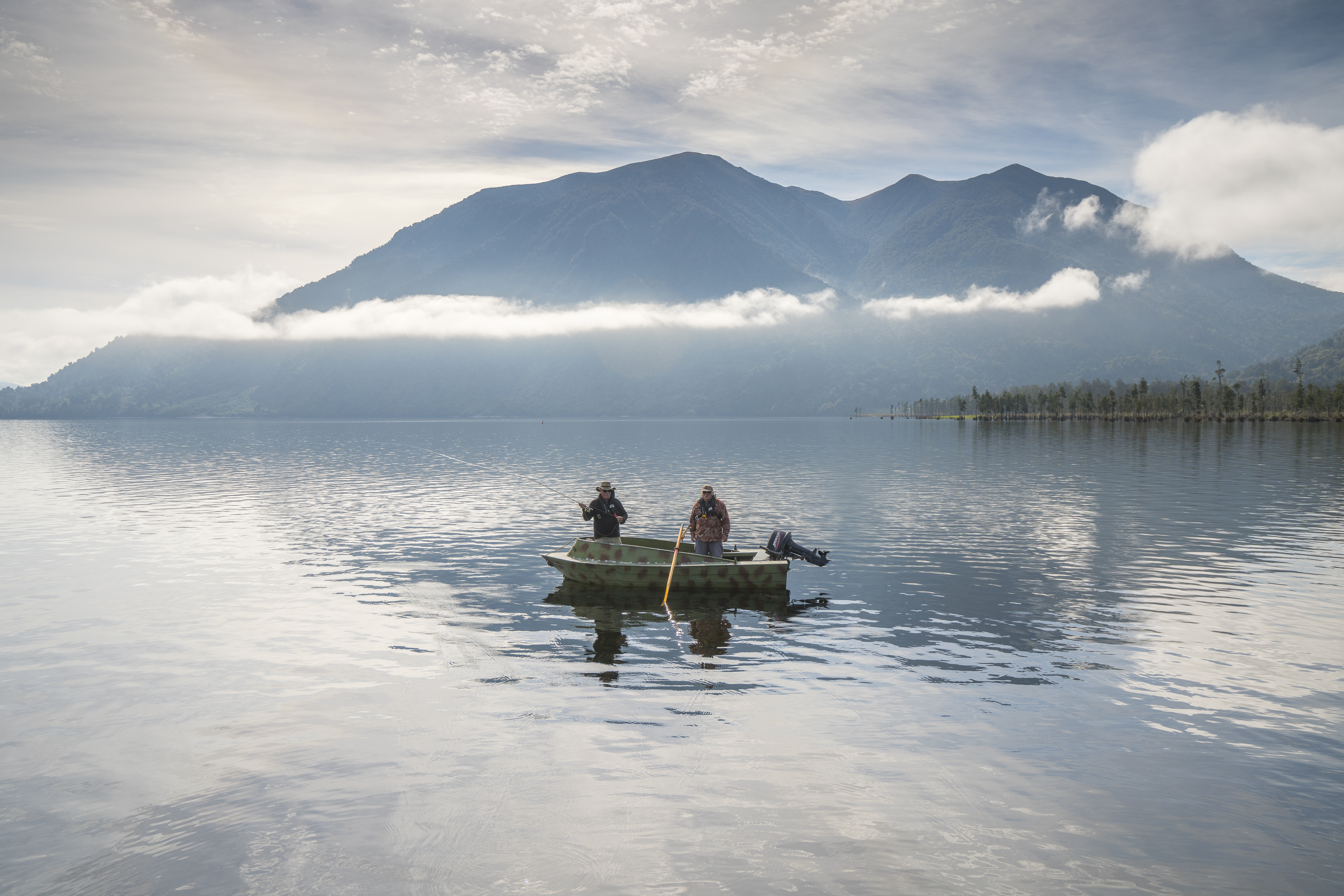

== See also ==
- Lakes of New Zealand
