= Arthur Dudley Dobson Memorial =

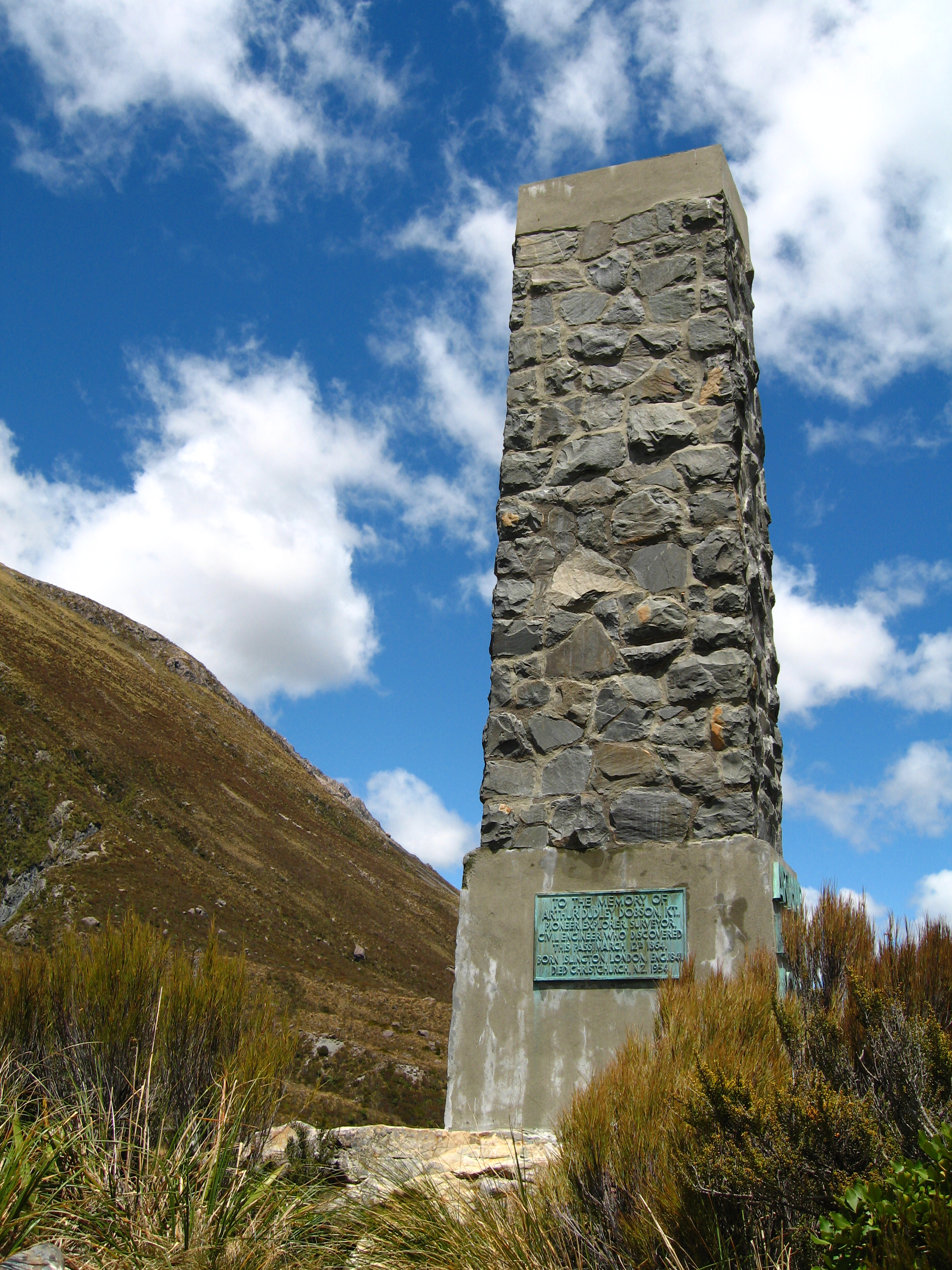
- The memorial in 2006
- Interactive map of Arthur Dudley Dobson Memorial
- Location: Arthur's Pass
- Coordinates: 42.9079°S 171.5591°E
- Designer: Cecil Wood
- Type: obelisk
- Material: Stone, reinforced concrete
- Height: 25 feet (7.6 m)
- Beginning date: January 1937
- Opening date: 18 April 1937
- Dedicated to: Arthur Dudley Dobson

The Arthur Dudley Dobson Memorial is a memorial obelisk at Arthur's Pass in New Zealand's Southern Alps. Unveiled in 1937 by former Prime Minister George Forbes, it commemorates Sir Arthur Dudley Dobson (1841–1934), after whom the pass is named.

== History ==
Dobson died in 1934 and early in the following year, proposals were put forward to commemorate him at Arthur's Pass. Organisations involved were The Sunlight League, the Youth Hostel Association, and the Canterbury Progress League. The Youth Hostel Association decided to approach architects for the project. Cora Wilding, who was on the executives of two of those organisations, was part of a subcommittee that chose the site for the memorial. The initial options considered were for shelters and the more enclosed design was agreed upon; This was a small stone shelter of 8 by 8 feet (2.4 m × 2.4 m) with external seats around its perimeter.

To raise the necessary funds, a conference of various organisations was initiated, to be chaired by Dan Sullivan, who at the time was mayor of Christchurch and member of parliament for the Avon electorate. The Canterbury Progress League disliked the utilitarian aspect of the proposed shelter and just prior to a large public meeting called by Sullivan for 8 August 1935, they presented an alternative memorial design: this was a stone obelisk designed by the architect Cecil Wood, assisted by the structural engineer Robert Campbell (1881–1955). This stone pillar was to have a core of reinforced concrete, with local stone attached to form the obelisk. Bronze plaques at the base were to show Dobson's name on one side and provide an inscription on the other side. The public meeting resolved that both memorials were to be built, with the stone pillar in the place originally chosen and the hut some distance closer to Arthur's Pass village. The Sunlight League and the Youth Hostel Association felt compelled to go ahead with the memorial shelter as they had been fundraising for that purpose since they presented the design earlier in the year.

From then on, the Canterbury Progress League was leading further initiatives. They were the contractual partner for the architect. They had a fundraising brochure produced that contained a biography of Dobson written by the rector of Canterbury College, James Hight, and 12,000 copies were distributed throughout New Zealand. The costs for both the stone column and the memorial hut were NZ£500 and half that amount had been received or spoken for by June 1936, with the funds previously raised for the shelter combined with the funds for the obelisk. Construction of the stone column was awarded through tender in December 1936 to Silvester and Company, who started work the following month.

By early March 1937, it was reported that the monument was nearing completion. The Progress League had drafted text for the memorial plaque that they put to Dobson's family for approval; the draft was used with a change to the date format (from "March 12, 1864" to "March 12th 1864":

To the memory of Arthur Dudley Dobson Kt.,
Pioneer, Explorer, Surveyor, Civil Engineer,
Who discovered this pass March 12, 1864.
Born Islington, London, England, 1841
Died Christchurch, New Zealand, 1934.

The memorial, which measures 25 feet (7.6 m) in height, was unveiled on 18 April 1937 by the former prime minister, George Forbes. The Railways Department put on a special train from Christchurch for the 700 people who attended. Other dignitaries who attended included R. M. D. Thomson (chairman of Tarawera County Council, covering the Canterbury area up to the Main Divide), the Hon. William Hayward (MLC; representing Christchurch City Council), Walter Moffatt (a former mayor of Nelson), and Frederick William Johnston (the former chairman of the Canterbury Progress League who was instrumental in advancing the memorial).

The plans for the shelter by the Sunlight League and the Youth Hostel Association were dropped, although the Arthur's Park National Park Board had a shelter built near the memorial. The plans were approved in April 1937 and the shelter had been constructed by the following June.

== Location ==
The memorial is located on a rock knoll adjacent to State Highway 73 near the highest point of the pass. It is located in Selwyn District, Canterbury, adjacent of the boundary with the region of West Coast. The Department of Conservation maintains the Arthur's Pass Walking Track that connects Arthur's Pass village to the memorial at the mountain pass; the 6.8 kilometres (4.2 mi) trip (one way) takes 2 hours 40 minutes for a return trip.

== Heritage listing ==
The memorial is listed in the Selwyn district plan with registration number H110 for its historical and social significance, its cultural significance, and its architectural and aesthetic significance. It also has technological and craftsmanship significance due to the construction quality and the involvement of Campbell as a leading civil engineer. It is a regional landmark that is often photographed being located next to a state highway in a picturesque setting.

Memorial illustrations
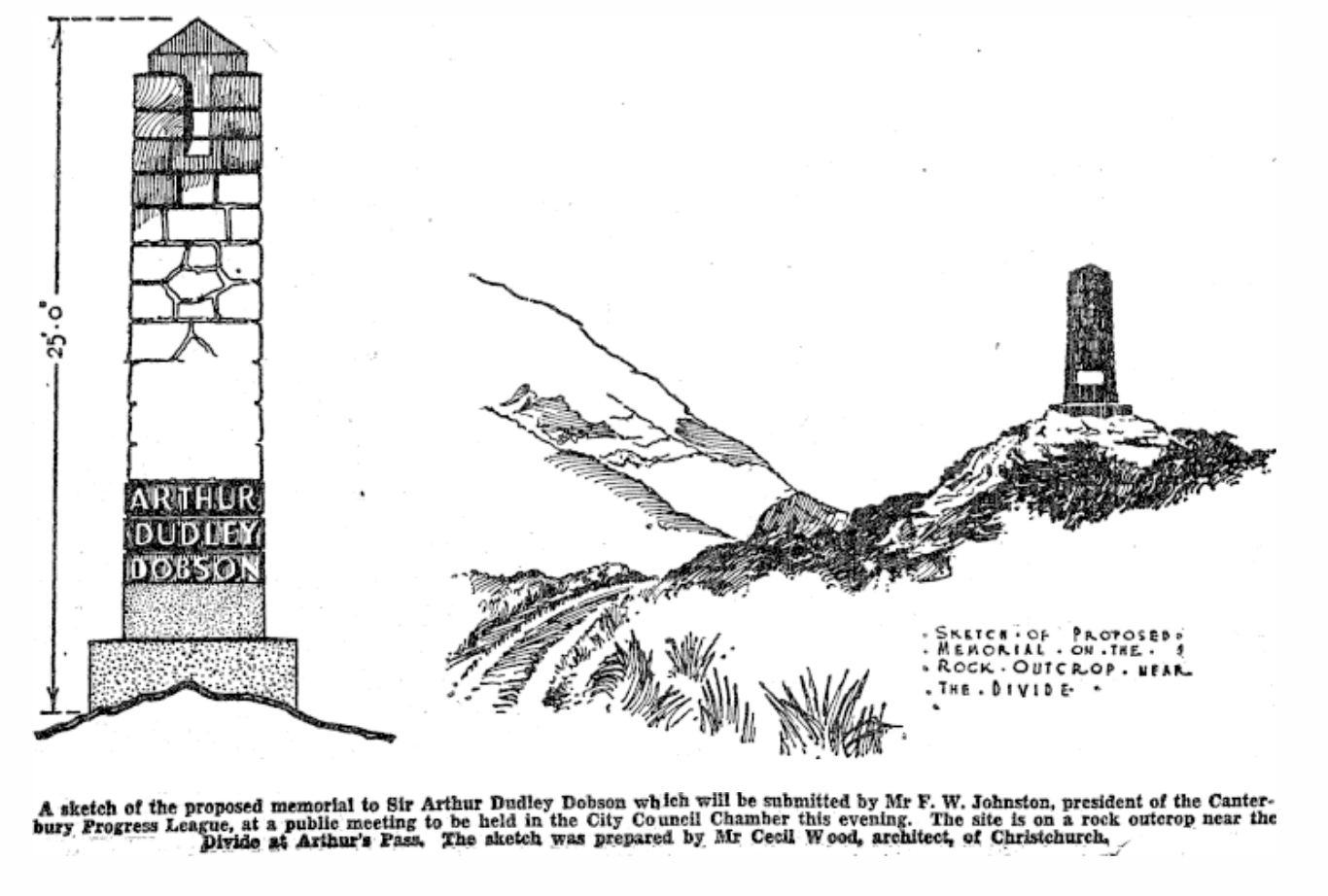
Cecil Wood's sketch of the memorial

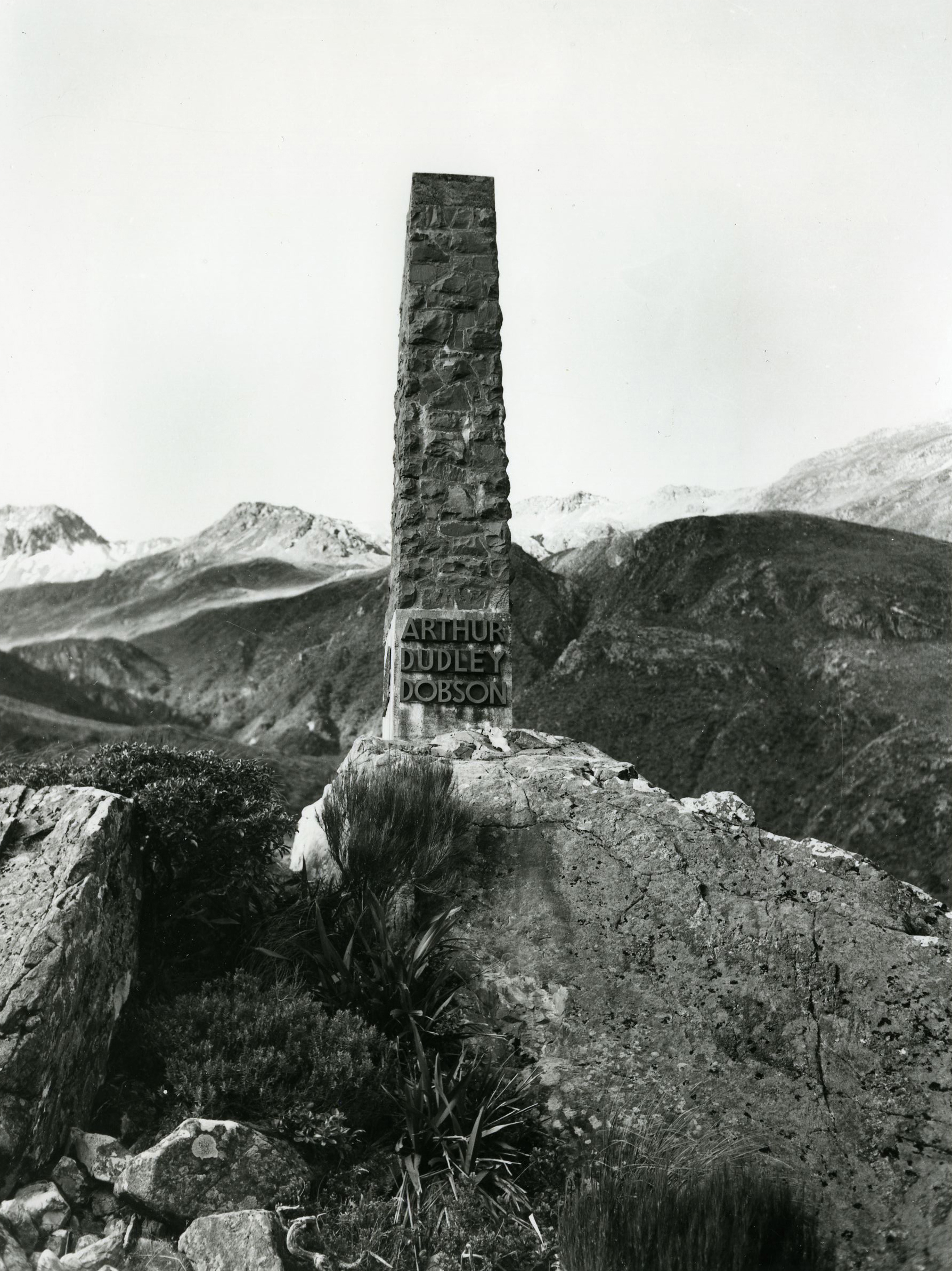
Historic photo

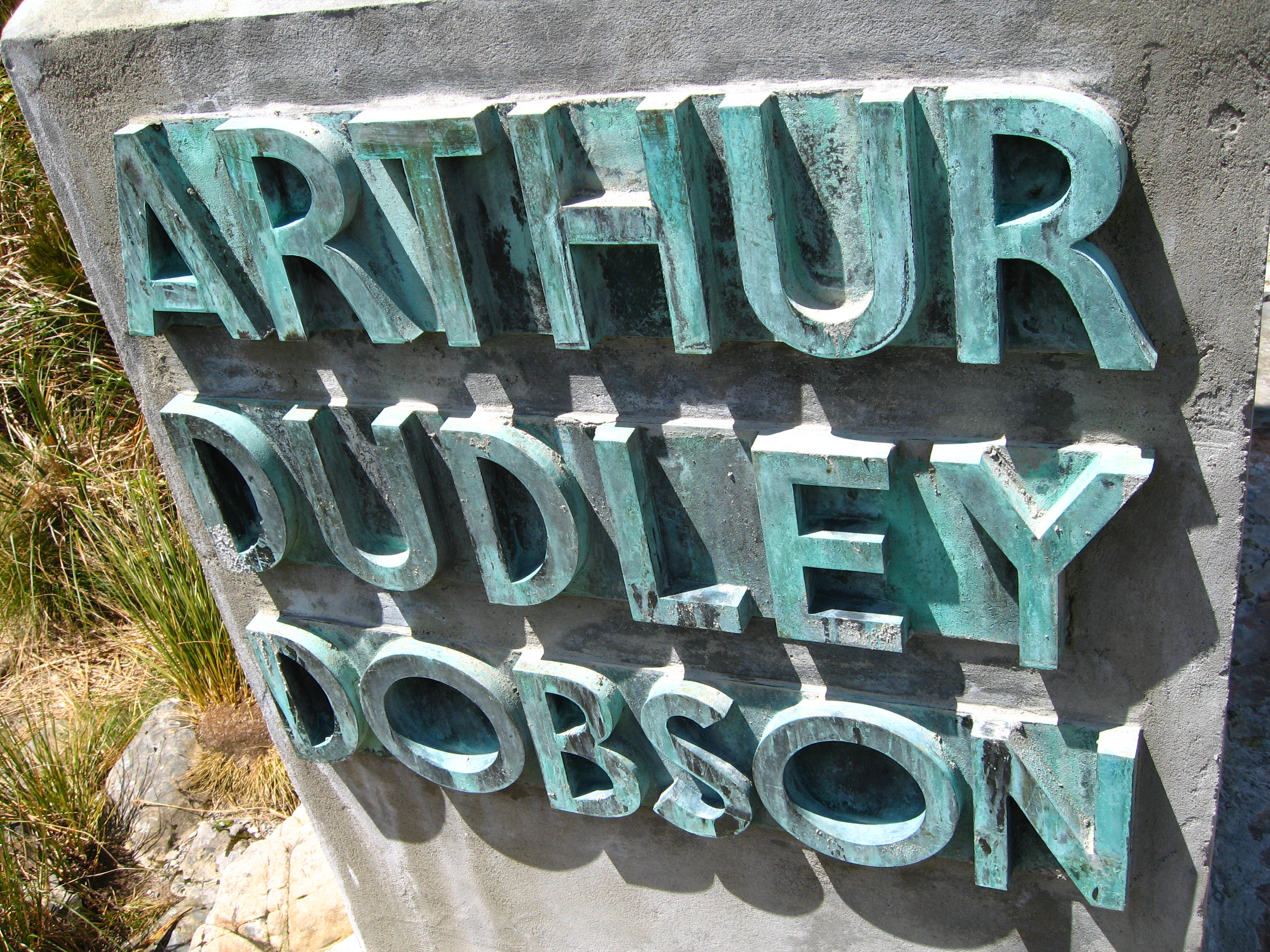
Name inscription

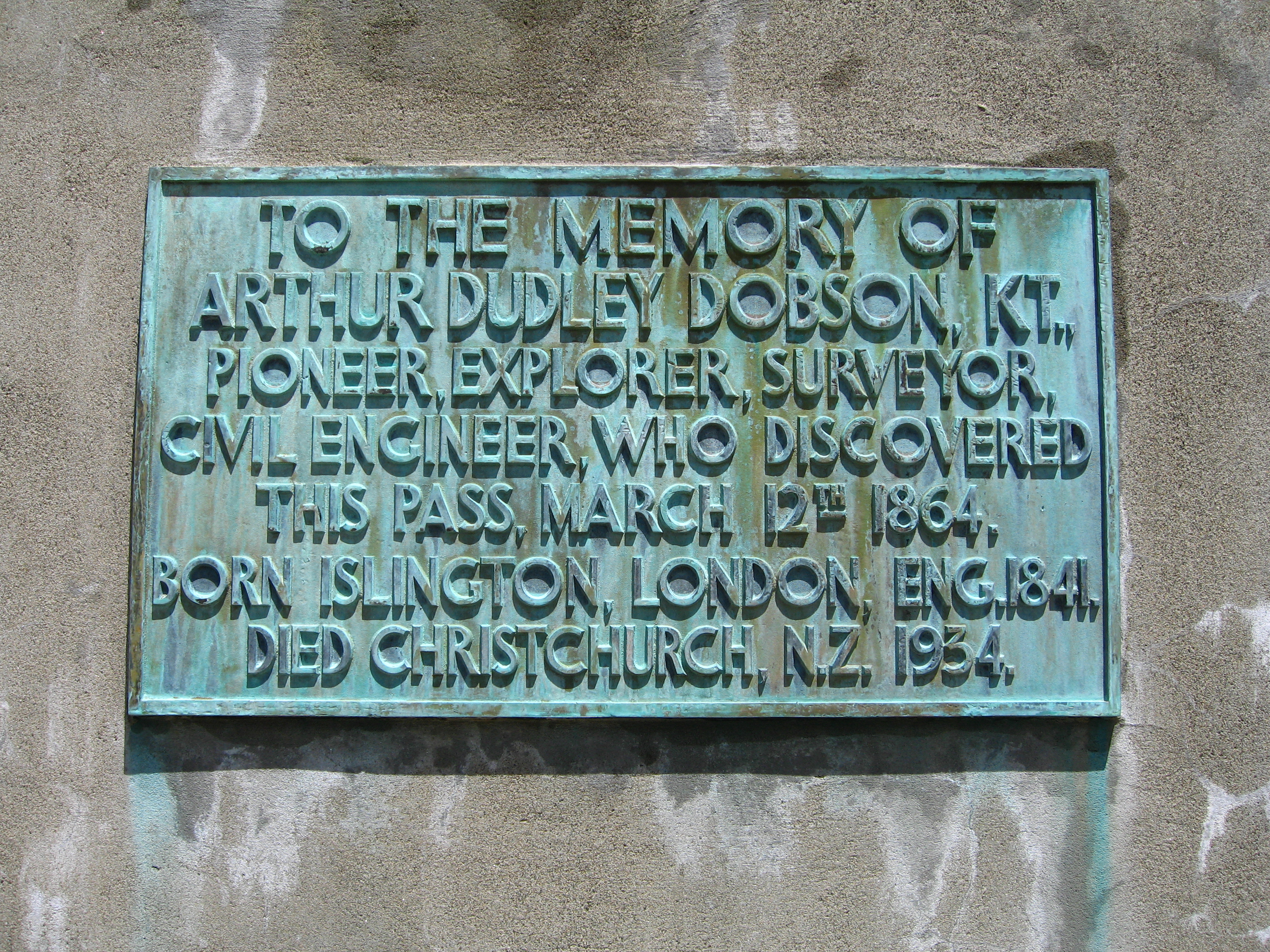
Dedication plaque
