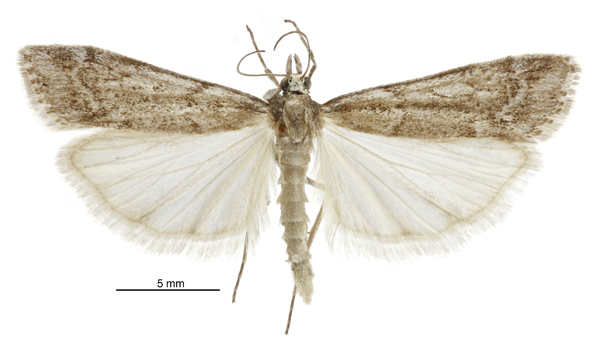
- male

Scientific classification
- Kingdom: Animalia
- Phylum: Arthropoda
- Class: Insecta
- Order: Lepidoptera
- Family: Crambidae
- Genus: Eudonia
- Species: E. axena

Binomial name
- Eudonia axena (Meyrick, 1884)

Synonyms
- Scoparia axena Meyrick, 1884

= Eudonia axena =

Species of moth

Eudonia axena is a moth of the family Crambidae. It was described by Edward Meyrick in 1884. It is endemic to New Zealand.

== Taxonomy ==
E. axena was first described by Edward Meyrick in 1884 using three specimens collected on grassy slopes at 4,500 ft at Arthur's Pass and named Scoparia axena. Meyrick gave a fuller description of the species in 1885. George Hudson discussed and illustrated the species in his 1928 book The butterflies and moths of New Zealand. John S. Dugdale placed this species in the genus Eudonia in 1988. The lectotype specimen, collected at Arthur's Pass, is held at the Natural History Museum, London.

== Description ==
The wingspan is 19–26 mm. The forewings are variable in colour, but the markings are always of the same form. They are sometimes mixed with ochreous-greenish, or partially blackish. In males, the markings are suffused with blackish towards the costa. The hindwings of the males are pale grey, while they are ochreous posteriorly in females.

Hudson described this species as follows:

The expansion of the wings is about 1 1/8 inches. The forewings are very dull brownish-ochreous with the veins irregularly marked in blackish; there is a series of blackish terminal dots, the stigmata are faintly indicated by patches of blackish scales and the margins of the wings are finely sprinkled with white scales. The hind-wings are very pale ochreous with white cilia. This species is closely allied to S. paltomacha, but separable by its larger size, broader fore-wings and absence of clear blackish lines on veins.

== Distribution ==
This species is endemic to New Zealand. This species has been observed in the South Island.

== Behaviour ==
Adults have been recorded on wing in January.
