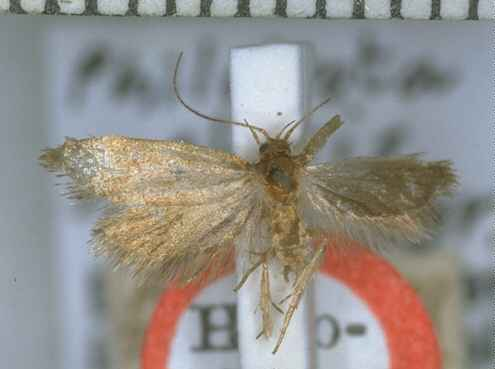
- Male holotype

Scientific classification
- Kingdom: Animalia
- Phylum: Arthropoda
- Class: Insecta
- Order: Lepidoptera
- Family: Oecophoridae
- Genus: Tingena
- Species: T. aletis

Binomial name
- Tingena aletis (Meyrick, 1905)

Synonyms
- Hypercallia aletis Meyrick, 1905; Philobota aletis (Meyrick, 1905)

= Tingena aletis =

Species of moth, endemic to New Zealand

Tingena aletis is a species of moth in the family Oecophoridae. It is endemic to New Zealand and has been collected in the vicinity of Arthur's Pass in the South Island. Adults are on the wing in January.

== Taxonomy ==
This species was first described by Edward Meyrick in 1905, using a male specimen he collected at Arthur's Pass at 3000 ft in January, and named Hypercallia aletis. In 1915 Meyrick placed this species within the genus Philobota. George Hudson discussed this species under the name Philobota aletis in his 1928 publication The butterflies and moths of New Zealand. In 1988 J. S. Dugdale placed this species within the genus Tingena. The male holotype is held in the New Zealand Arthropod Collection.

== Description ==
This species was described by Meyrick as follows:

♂. 13 mm. Head and thorax light fuscous sprinkled with whitish-ochreous. Palpi whitish-ochreous, a subapical ring of second joint, and terminal joint except apex somewhat infuscated. Antennae greyish-ochreous, ciliations 3. Abdomen fuscous. Fore-wings elongate, moderate, costa gently arched, apex round-pointed, termen somewhat rounded, rather strongly oblique; greyish-ochreous irrorated with fuscous; some dark fuscous scales towards base of costa; first discal and plical stigmata very obscure, darker, plical rather obliquely beyond first discal; second discal distinct, dark fuscous, with some whitish scales beneath it : cilia greyish-ochreous mixed with fuscous. Hind-wings rather dark fuscous, lighter anteriorly; cilia light fuscous, with darker subbasal shade, tips whitish.

This species was regarded by both Meyrick and Hudson as being obscure.

== Distribution ==
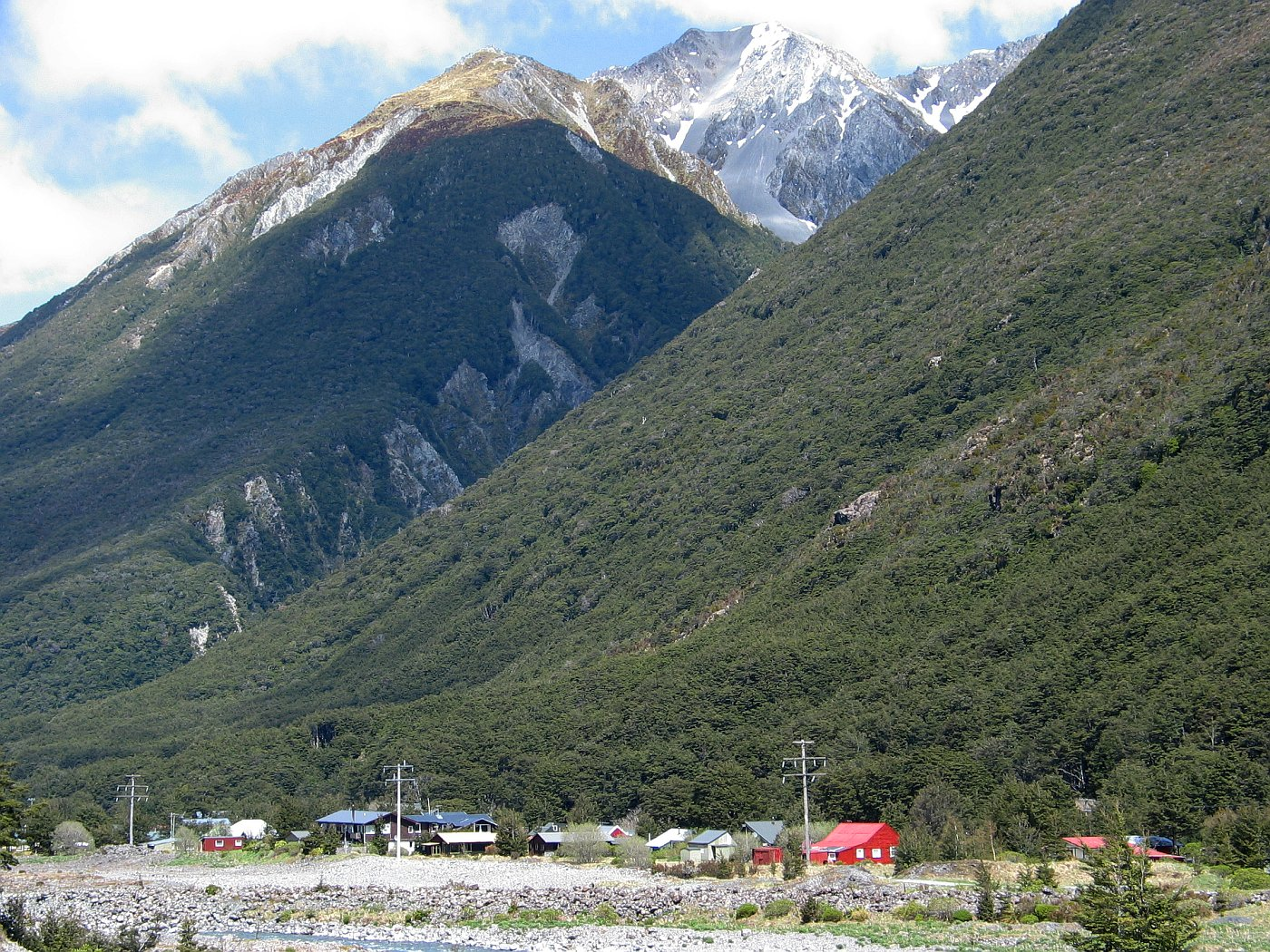
Arthur's Pass, type locality of T. aletis.

This species is endemic to New Zealand.

== Behaviour ==
Adults of this species are on the wing in January.
