= 1931 New Year Honours (New Zealand) =

Annual awards for New Zealanders

The 1931 New Year Honours in New Zealand were appointments by King George V on the advice of the New Zealand government to various orders and honours to reward and highlight good works by New Zealanders. The awards celebrated the passing of 1930 and the beginning of 1931, and were announced on 1 January 1931. New Zealand scientist Ernest Rutherford was created 1st Baron Rutherford of Nelson in the British New Year Honours.

The recipients of honours are displayed here as they were styled before their new honour.

== Knight Bachelor ==
- Arthur Dudley Dobson MICE – of Christchurch. For services in New Zealand.
- Cecil Leys – of Auckland. For services in New Zealand.
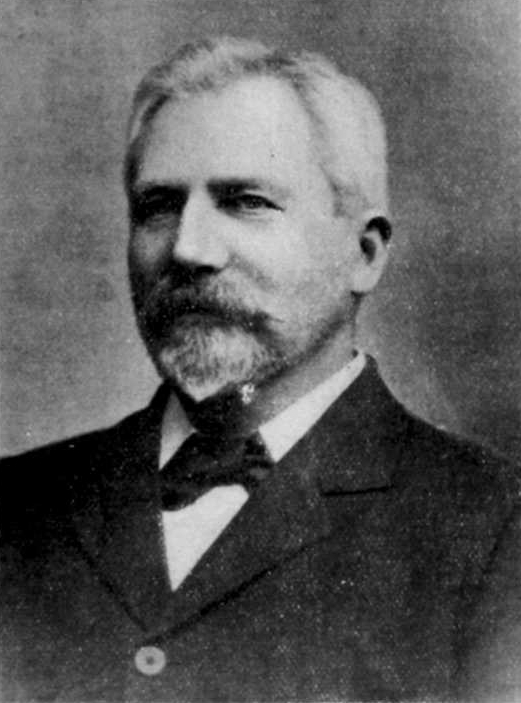
Sir Arthur Dobson

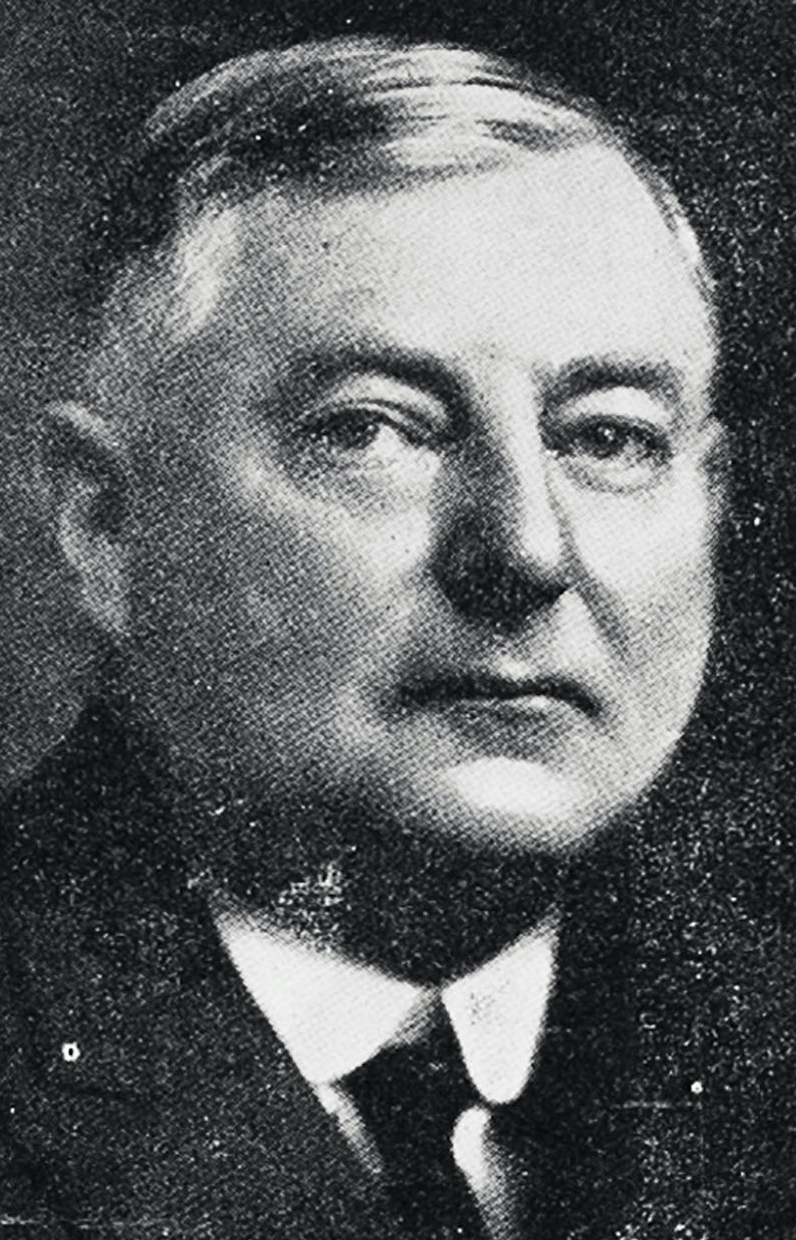
Sir Cecil Leys

== Order of Saint Michael and Saint George ==
=== Companion (CMG) ===
- Alexander Crabb – secretary, office of the New Zealand High Commissioner in London.
- George Alexander Troup – mayor of Wellington. For public services.
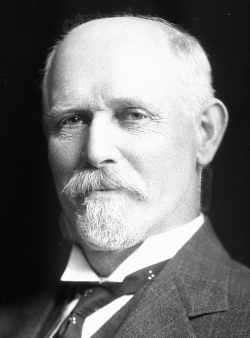
George Troup

== Order of the British Empire ==
=== Commander (CBE) ===
Civil division

- William Waddel – of Wellington; superintendent, State Advances Department.
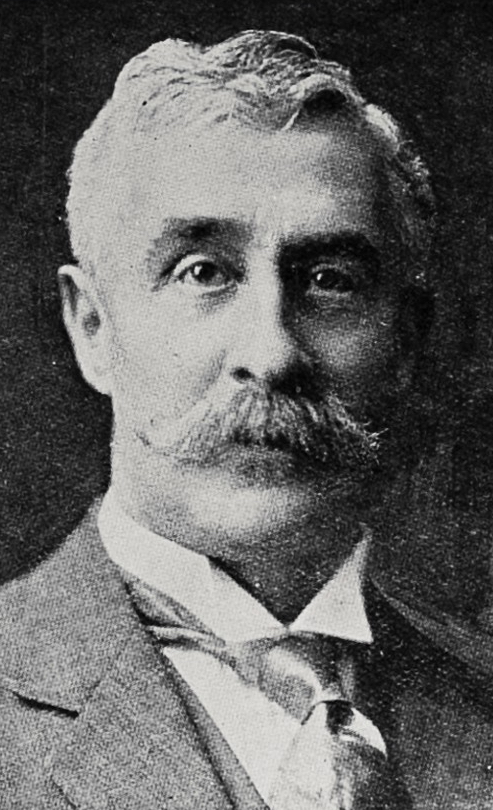
William Waddel

=== Officer (OBE) ===
Civil division, honorary

- Malietoa Tanumafili – of Western Samoa. For services to the government of New Zealand.
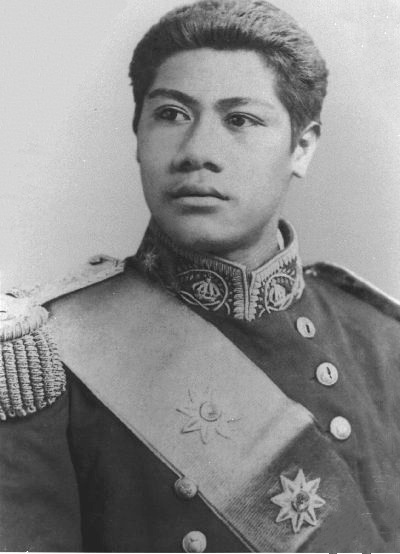
Malietoa Tanumafili
