= Arthur Dudley Dobson =

New Zealand engineer and surveyor (1841–1939)

Sir Arthur Dudley Dobson
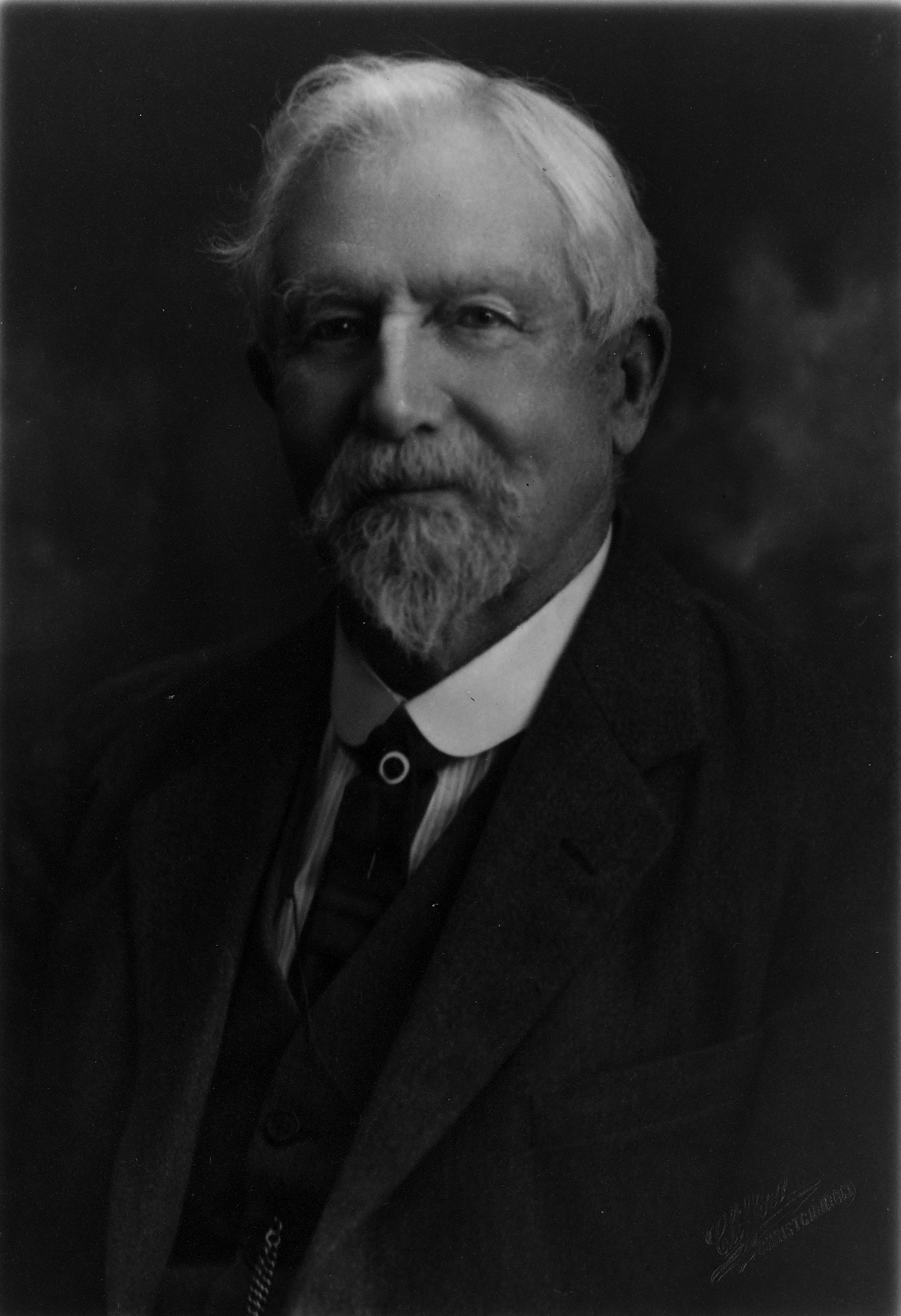
- Dobson in 1932
- Born: Arthur Dudley Dobson; 9 September 1841; Islington, England
- Died: 5 March 1934 (aged 92); Christchurch, New Zealand
- Education: Christ's College
- Spouse: Eleanor Lewis (m. 1866; died 1930)
- Parent: Edward Dobson
- Engineering career
- Discipline: Railway, civil, surveying
- Projects: Lyttelton Rail Tunnel
- Significant design: Midland Line
- Significant advance: First European to cross Arthur's Pass

Sir Arthur Dudley Dobson (9 September 1841 – 5 March 1934) was a New Zealand surveyor, engineer and explorer. Born in London, he came to Lyttelton, New Zealand, in 1850 on one of the First Four Ships. He is best known for taking the first party of Europeans over Arthur's Pass.

== Early life ==
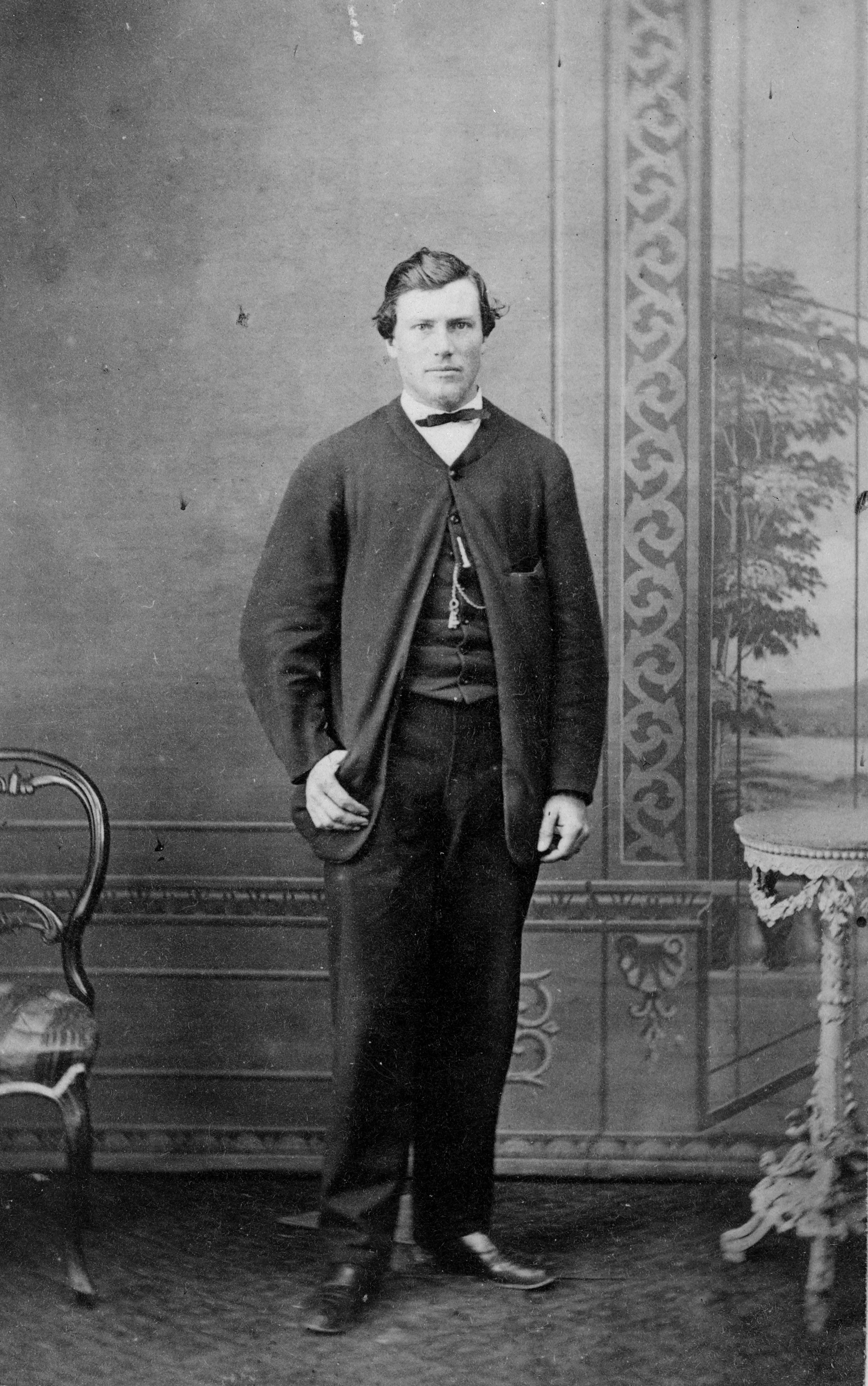
Arthur Dobson in 1864

Arthur Dudley Dobson was born in Islington, London, in 1841. He was the son of Edward Dobson (1816–1908) and Mary Ann, née Lough. His father was a surveyor and railway engineer, which had a major influence on his life. He received his early education in Nottingham.

When the railway boom ended in England, his father decided to emigrate to New Zealand. He purchased land from the Canterbury Association and sailed to the colony on the Cressy, one of the First Four Ships. The Cressy arrived in Lyttelton on 27 December 1850. He took his two oldest boys with him, George (1840–1866) and Arthur.

His father found that life in the new colony with two young sons was challenging, and they were sent to their uncle, Reverend Charles Dobson, the vicar of Buckland in Tasmania, where they stayed for three years. On their return journey, they landed in Nelson, where they stayed with another uncle, Alfred Dobson. He was surveying the Nelson region and soon after became the Nelson provincial surveyor.

Meanwhile, his mother had arrived on the Fatima, which had landed in Lyttelton exactly one year after them, on 27 December 1851. She had the other children with her: Mary Ann (1844–1913), Caroline (1845–1932), Edward Henry (1847–1934) and Maria Eliza (b. 1848). His remaining siblings were born in New Zealand: Robert (1852–1893), Emily Frances (1857–1943), Herbert Alex (1860–1948) and Collet Barker (1861–1926).

As his father had been appointed Canterbury provincial engineer in 1854, the financial situation improved, and the boys were sent to Christ's College, then the best school in Christchurch. Prior to this, Arthur was taught by the Reverend George Cotterill in Lyttelton.

== Professional career ==
After he finished his schooling, he was apprenticed with his father. An early task for the father and son team was to determine the depth of mud in Lyttelton Harbour. They then surveyed the Rangiora main drain, which resulted in reclaiming 20,000 acres (81 km^{2}) of swamp land.

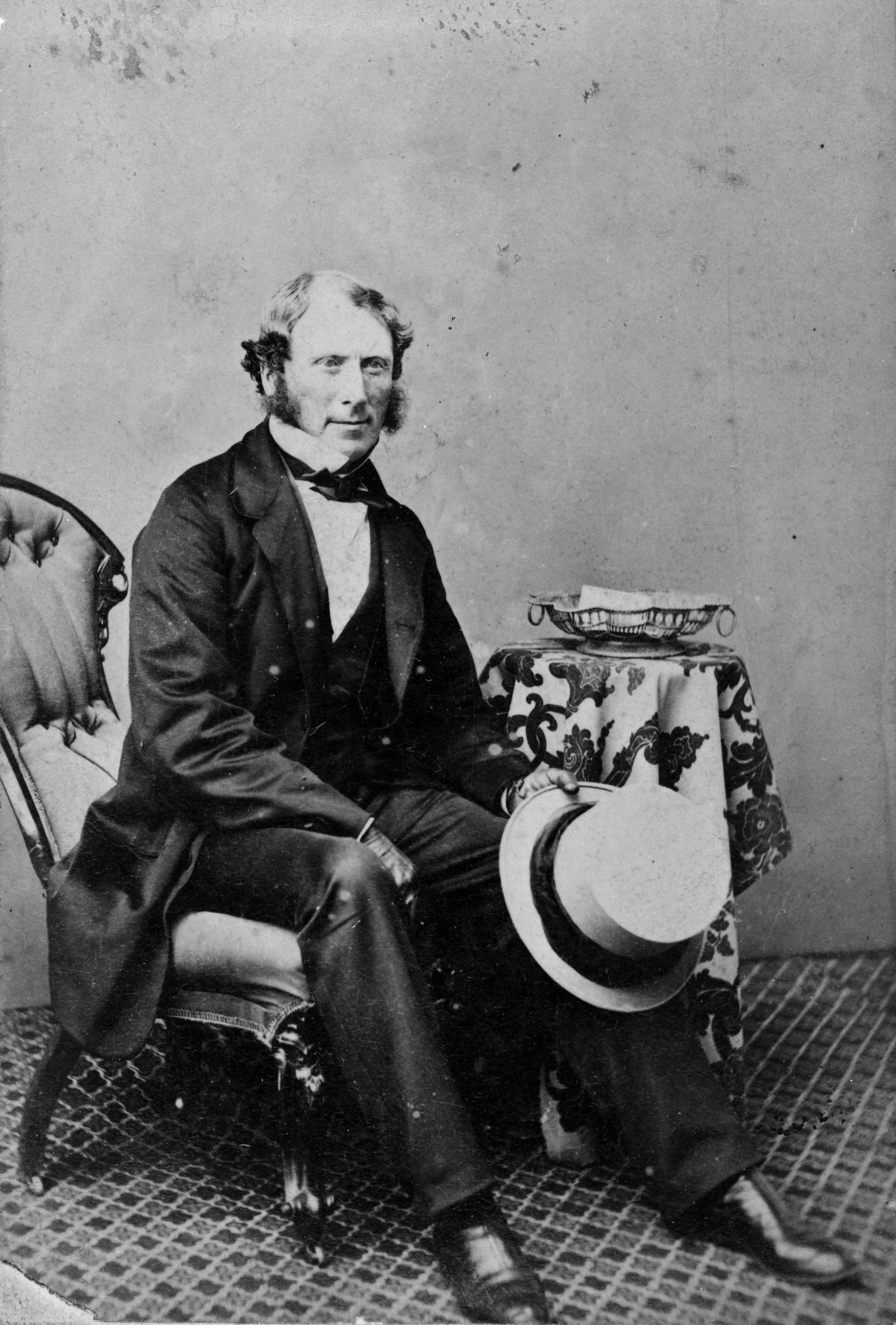
Edward Dobson, ca 1866

Arthur Dobson spent several months surveying in North Canterbury, reaching Lake Sumner and the Hurunui River. From December 1860, he spent two years with the German immigrant geologist Julius von Haast. Haast was appointed provincial geologist in February 1861, and he undertook much geological work with Dobson. The two undertook geological surveys, explored and surveyed the Kowai River, explored the Southern Alps and its glaciers and tried climbing mountains, succeeding with Mount Torlesse but failing to scale Mt Cook.

His father supervised the construction of the Ferrymead Railway, connecting the wharf in Ferrymead with Christchurch and opening on 1 December 1863. This was New Zealand's first public railway. A telegraph line was built along the rail corridor between Lyttelton and Christchurch, and when it opened on 1 July 1862, it was the first telegraph line in New Zealand. New Zealand Post celebrated the centenary with the publication of two commemorative stamps.

His father's most important project was the superintendency of the Lyttelton Rail Tunnel, an engineering feat that is recognised with a Category I heritage protection by Heritage New Zealand. Arthur Dobson prepared many of the sectional drawings.

In 1863, he went to the mostly unexplored West Coast of the South Island for seven months of survey work. His area of work extended from the Grey River to Abut Head, and inland up to the Main Divide. His brother Edward, meanwhile, was clearing a rough track over Harper Pass. Arthur Dobson returned to Christchurch and reported his findings to the chief surveyor, Thomas Cass.

Cass then commissioned Arthur Dobson in 1864 to find out whether there is a suitable pass from the Waimakariri watershed to the West Coast. George and Arthur Dobson set out in March 1864, later to be joined by their brother Edward at Craigieburn. While George surveyed road lines there, Edward and Arthur proceeded to explore the high country. On the advice of West Coast Māori chief Tarapuhi, they found a pass that steeply descended to what became known as Otira; the route had long been used by Māori for trading pounamu. Arthur prepared a report, which included a sketch of the unnamed pass, and presented it to Cass.

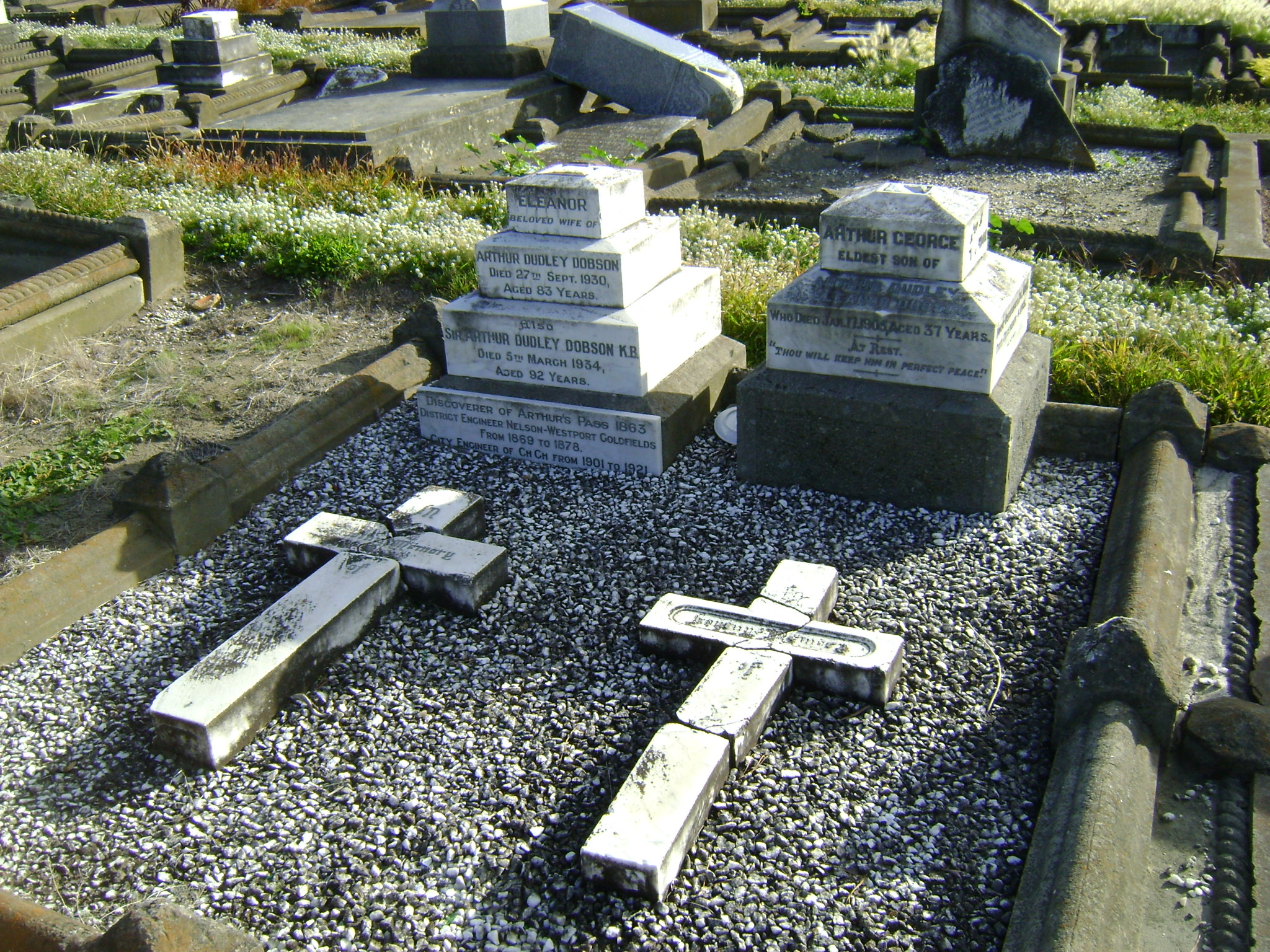
Grave of Arthur Dudley Dobson and other family members

Soon after, the discovery of gold triggered the West Coast gold rush. Edward Dobson was commissioned to examine every possible pass to the West Coast from the watersheds of the Waimakariri, Taramakau and Hurunui Rivers. After finishing his examination, he declared that "Arthur's pass" was by far the most suitable to get to the gold fields. The provincial government decided that a road was to be built between Christchurch and Hokitika, a distance of 156 miles (251 km), and Edward Dobson was put in charge of the project. The road was opened on 20 March 1866. The alpine pass became known as Arthur's Pass, with a nearby village and a later a national park also taking this name.

On 1 October 1866, Arthur Dobson was appointed assistant provincial engineer for Nelson. Soon after, he married and started a family. The following year, he explored the Motueka and Karamea districts, and surveyed a track over the Mount Arthur Range. In April 1869, he became the district engineer for the West Coast gold fields that were located within the Nelson Province, with him being based in Westport. In May 1871, he was promoted to provincial engineer, and in December of that year he became chief surveyor. While still employed by the Nelson Province, he was put in charge of railway construction in Westport by the government in October 1872.

He resigned his roles with the Nelson Province in 1875 over a change in provincial government. He was then appointed by central government as the district engineer for Nelson, with responsibility for railway construction. He mapped the Westport coalfields with James Hector.

In 1884, he went to London, where he had many interests, all fed by his London life; met botanists, geologists, went to concerts and galleries, and took lessons in the flute. When he returned to New Zealand in 1885 the depression changed his circumstances: he worked in Victoria until 1889, returned to New Zealand and took over his father's business.

He was Christchurch City Engineer from 1901 to 1921. He was appointed a Knight Bachelor in the 1931 New Year Honours.

== Family, death and commemoration ==
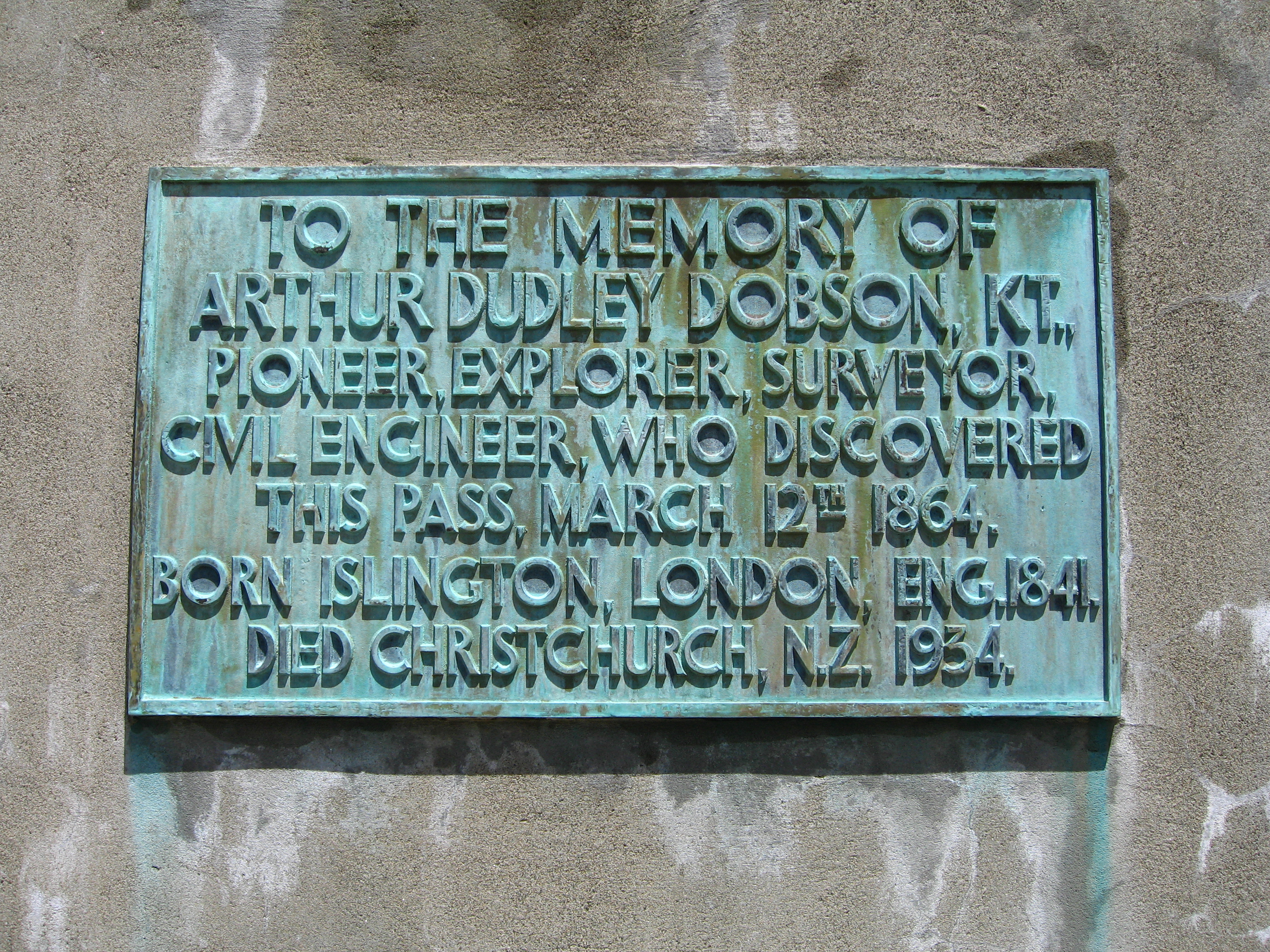
Arthur's Pass memorial plaque

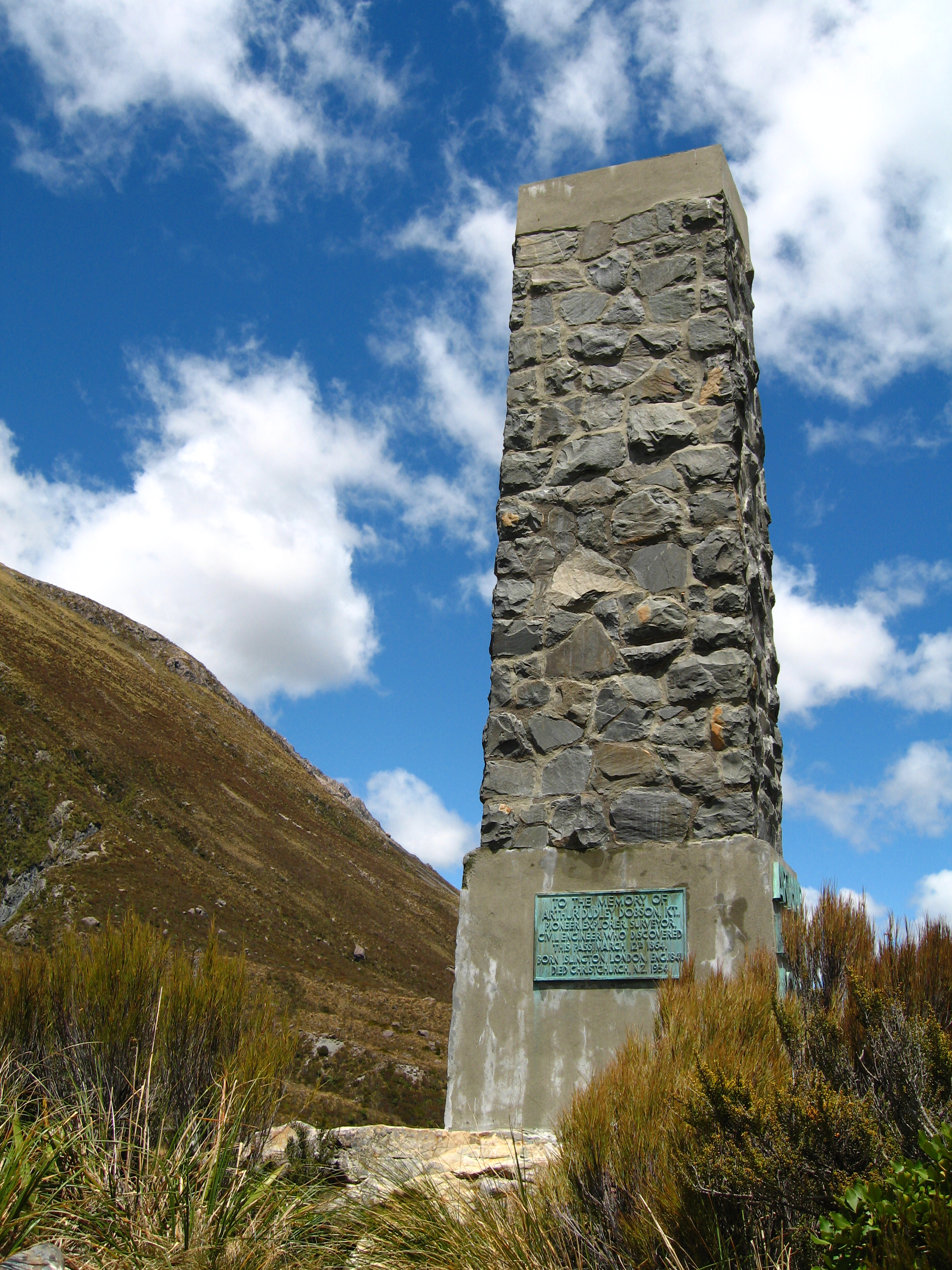
Arthur's Pass memorial cairn

Dobson married Eleanor, the daughter of the Nelson Provincial Council survey staff member Henry Lewis, on 20 November 1866 at Nelson. They had four children.

Haast became Dobson's brother in law on 25 June 1863, by marrying his sister Mary at St Mary's Church in Heathcote Valley. The couple had four sons and a daughter.

His first son Arthur George Dobson, Selwyn County engineer, died on 17 January 1905 (aged 37) after having been thrown from a cart. He was buried at Linwood Cemetery two days later.

His wife died on 27 September 1930, aged 83 years. His second son, Ernest Henry Dobson, also died before him. He is also buried in Linwood Cemetery (but in a different area of it), having died on 16 October 1931. He was interred the following day. His headstone reads: "In loving memory of Ernest Henry beloved husband of Elizabeth Mary DOBSON and second son of Sir Arthur Dudley and the late Eleanor DOBSON Died 16th October 1931 aged 62 years At rest"

Arthur Dobson died on 5 March 1934 at Christchurch of cardiac arrest. He was buried at Linwood Cemetery the following day in the same plot as his first son and his wife. His tombstone reads:

Sir Arthur Dudley Dobson K.B. d 5 March 1934 aged 92. Discoverer of Arthur's Pass, 1863. District Engineer, Nelson-Westport goldfield 1878. City Engineer of Christchurch from 1901 to 1921.

Arthur's Pass was named by his father for him, and the village and the National Park are derived from his name, too. A memorial cairn is placed at the alpine pass.

Dobson Street in Spreydon is named for him.
