= Arthur's Pass (mountain pass) =

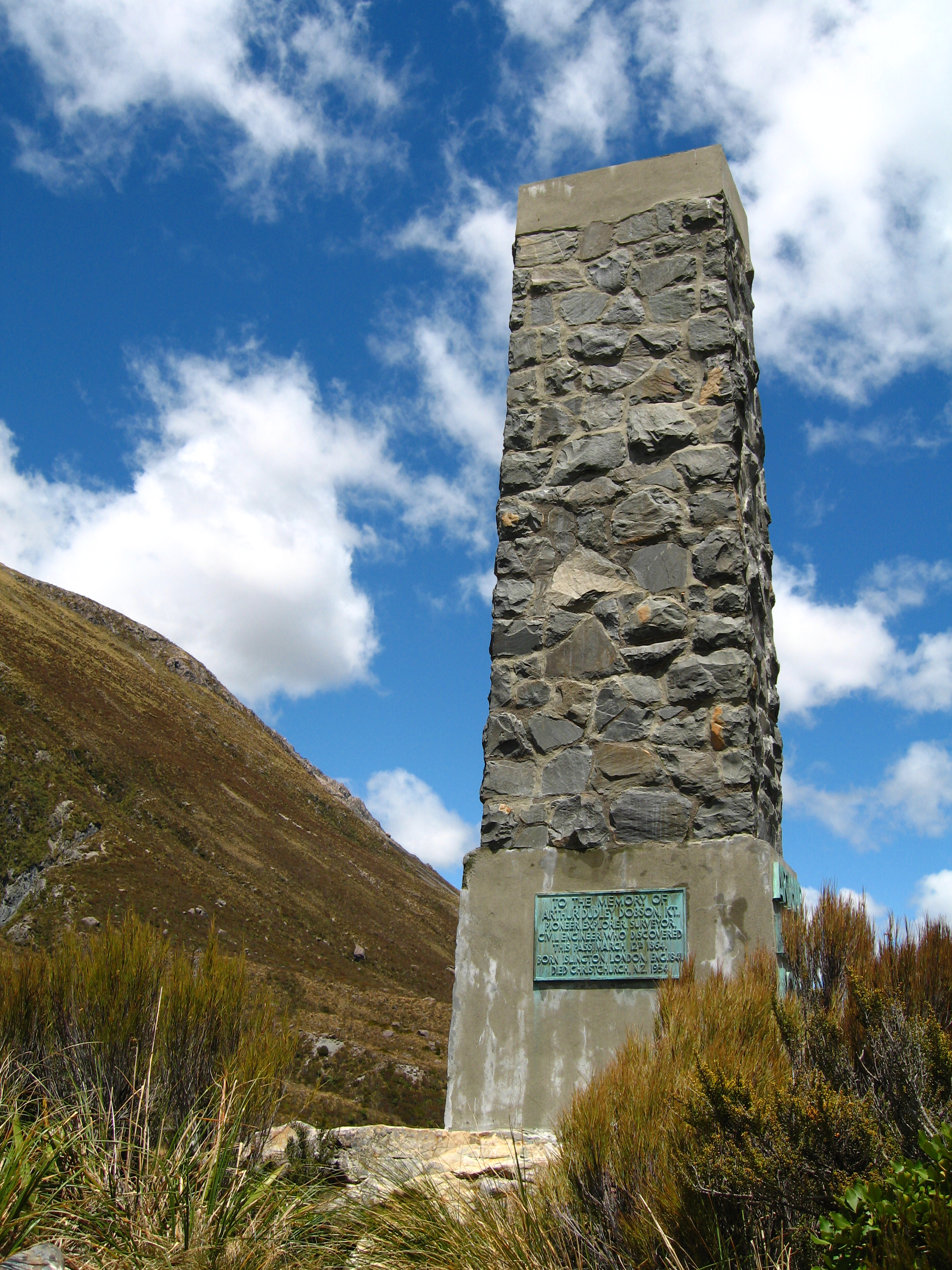
- Arthur Dudley Dobson memorial
- Interactive map of Arthur's Pass
- Elevation: 920 m (3,020 ft)
- Traversed by: State Highway 73

Third Approach
- Location: New Zealand
- Range: Southern Alps
- Coordinates: 42°54′30″S 171°33′35″E

Arthur's Pass is a mountain pass in the Southern Alps of the South Island of New Zealand. The pass sits 920 metres or 3,020 feet above sea level and marks part of the boundary between the West Coast and Canterbury regions. Located 140 km from Christchurch and 95 km from Greymouth, the pass comprises part of a saddle between the valleys of the Ōtira River (a tributary of the Taramakau River in the west) and of the Bealey River (in the east). Arthur's Pass lies on the border of the Selwyn and Westland districts.

A township of the same name lies about 5 km south of the mountain pass. The pass is named after Arthur Dudley Dobson and a memorial at the pass commemorates him.

== History ==
For hundreds of years Māori had crossed the Southern Alps by every pass free of snow in the summer months. The reason for making this difficult journey was greenstone (pounamu), highly prized both for its hardness and beauty and found only on the West Coast of the South Island. By the time Europeans arrived, the only pass in regular use was the one now known as Harper Pass, north of Arthur's Pass. When Leonard Harper was led in 1857 by Māori guides across the pass which now bears his name, Tarapuhi, chief at the Māori settlement of Māwhera (now Greymouth), told him about a route across the mountains at the head of the Ōtira River that had not been used in living memory. Bad weather prevented Harper from exploring it on his return journey.

In 1860 writer and explorer Samuel Butler had seen a pass at the head of the Bealey Valley, but was travelling alone and did not want to leave his horse unattended so "shirked investigation".

In 1864 Arthur Dudley Dobson (1841–1934) along with his brother Edward were the first Europeans to cross the pass. In 1863 Dobson went to the mostly unexplored West Coast for seven months of survey work. His area of work extended from the Grey River to Abut Head, and inland up to the Main Divide. His brother Edward, meanwhile, was clearing a rough track over Harper Pass. Arthur Dobson returned to Christchurch and reported his findings to the chief surveyor, Thomas Cass.

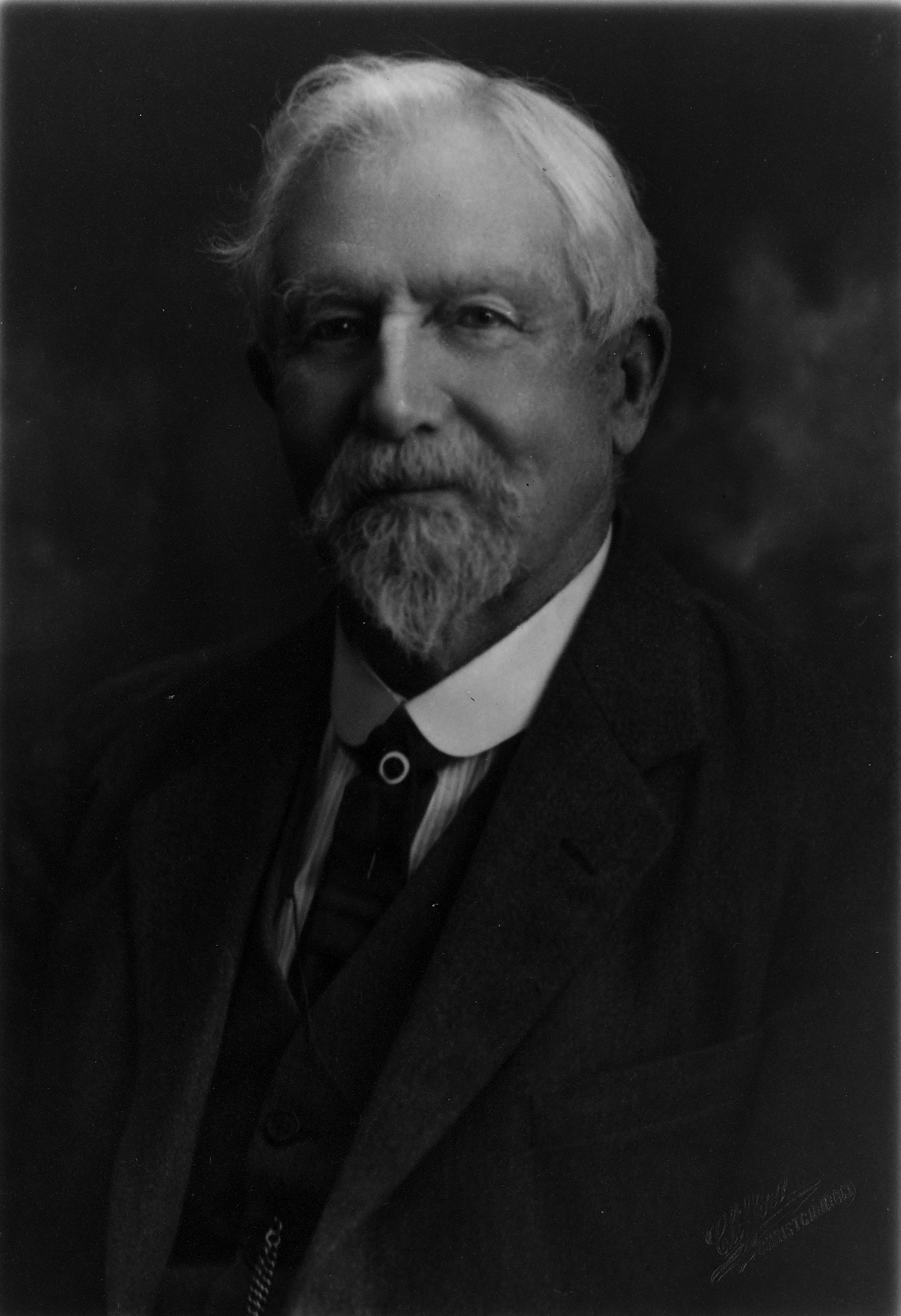
Arthur Dudley Dobson in circa 1932

Cass then commissioned Arthur Dobson in 1864 to find out whether there was a suitable pass from the Waimakariri watershed to the West Coast. George and Arthur Dobson set out in March 1864, later to be joined by their brother Edward at Craigieburn. While George surveyed road lines there, Edward and Arthur proceeded to explore the high country. On 13 March 1864 they found the pass mentioned by Tarapuhi to Harper, which steeply descended to what became known as Otira. They explored the gorge as far as the junction of the Rolleston River, but saw no good sheep country so retraced their steps. Arthur prepared a report, which included a sketch of the pass which he described as the "Arahura Saddle", thinking it led to the Arahura River, and presented it to Cass.

Soon after, the discovery of gold triggered the West Coast gold rush. The provincial engineer, their father Edward Dobson, was commissioned to examine every possible pass to the West Coast from the watersheds of the Waimakariri, Taramakau and Hurunui Rivers. After finishing his examination, he declared that "Arthur's pass" was by far the most suitable to get to the gold fields. The provincial government decided that a road was to be built between Christchurch and Hokitika, a distance of 156 miles (251 km), and Edward Dobson was put in charge of the project. The road was opened on 20 March 1866. The alpine pass became known as Arthur's Pass, with a nearby village and a later a national park also taking this name. Arthur Dobson had a long and distinguished career, was knighted in 1931, and after his death in 1934, calls for a memorial came up. The Arthur Dudley Dobson memorial, a stone column of 25 feet (7.6 m) in height, was unveiled in April 1937 at the alpine pass that bears his name.

== Road link ==
State Highway 73 passes over Arthur's Pass and is the highest of only three roads crossing the Southern Alps, the other crossings being the Haast Pass and the Lewis Pass. However, Porters Pass, on the same road, is higher (at 939 m) than Arthur's Pass, but it is not considered one of the alpine passes, as it is located in the Canterbury foothills not far away from Springfield.

Previously prone to be blocked by landslides or avalanches, the road on the western side of the pass has seen extensive civil engineering work in the late 1990s. Most notably, the Otira Viaduct, near the settlement of Otira and spanning 440 metres of unstable terrain, was completed in 1999.

== Rail link ==
The Midland Line, connecting Christchurch and the West Coast, crosses the Main Divide by means of the Otira Tunnel, between Arthur's Pass township and Otira. When opened in 1923, the tunnel was the longest in the British Empire.

Gallery

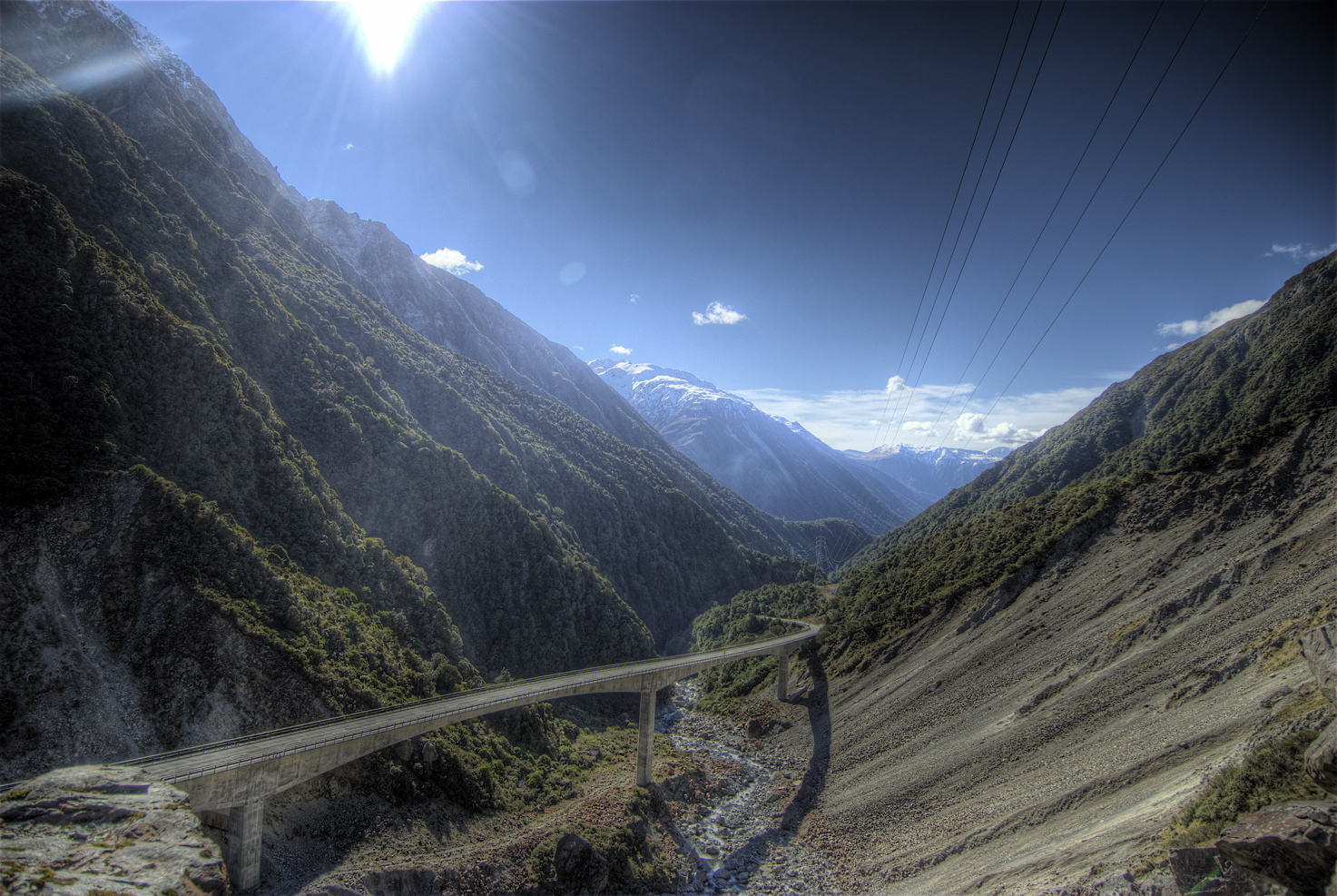
Otira Viaduct

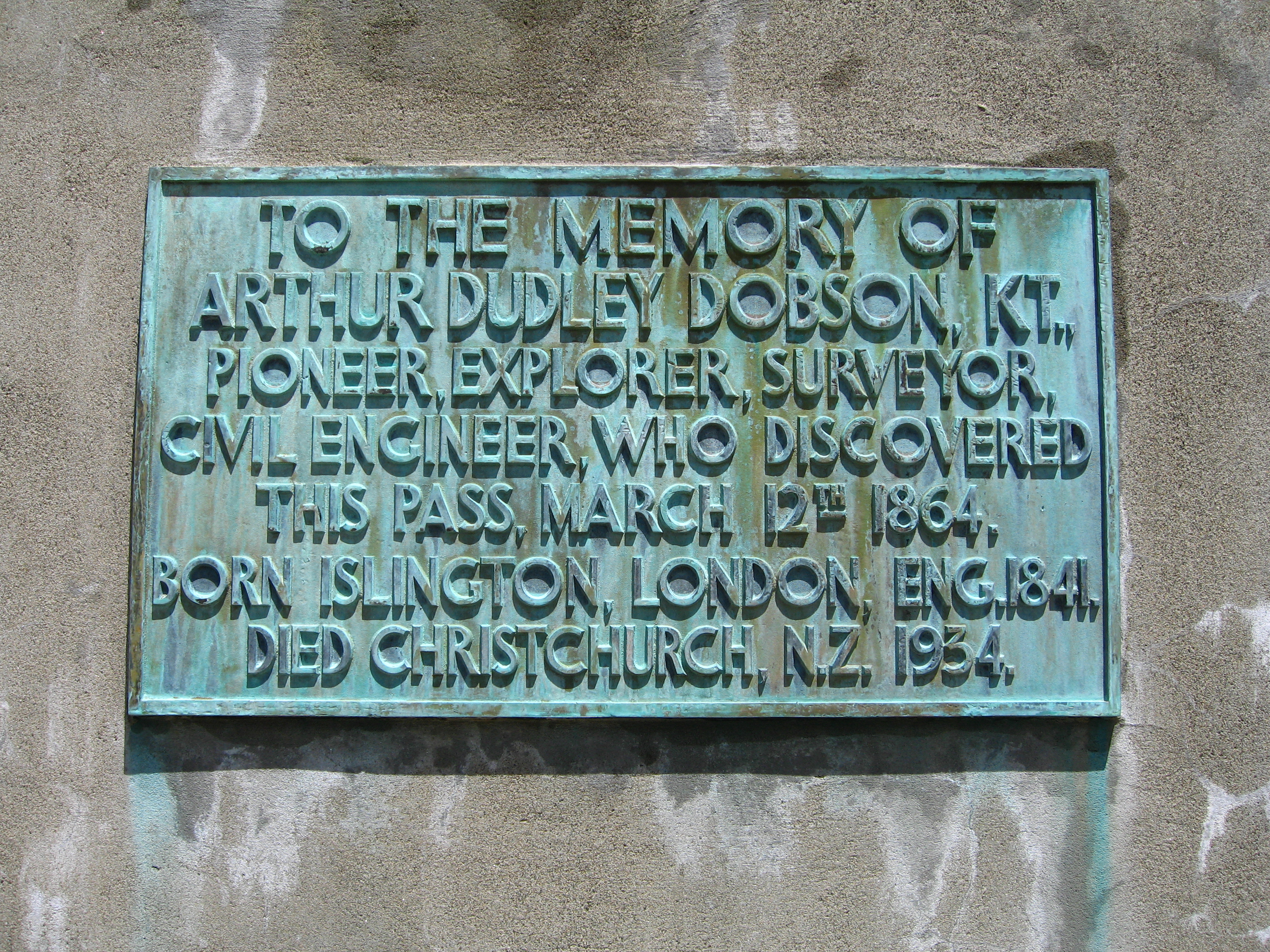
Memorial inscription

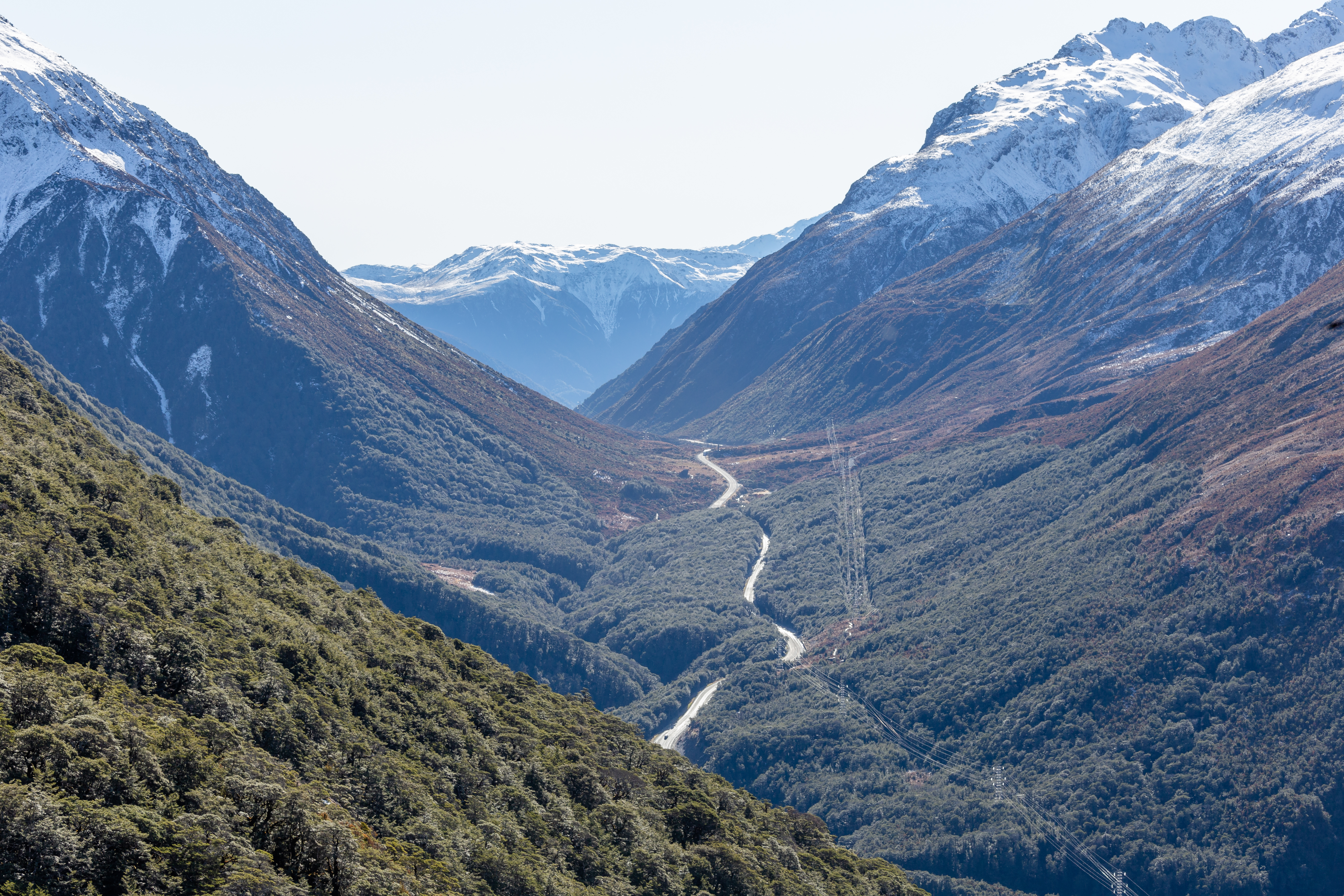
Arthur's Pass

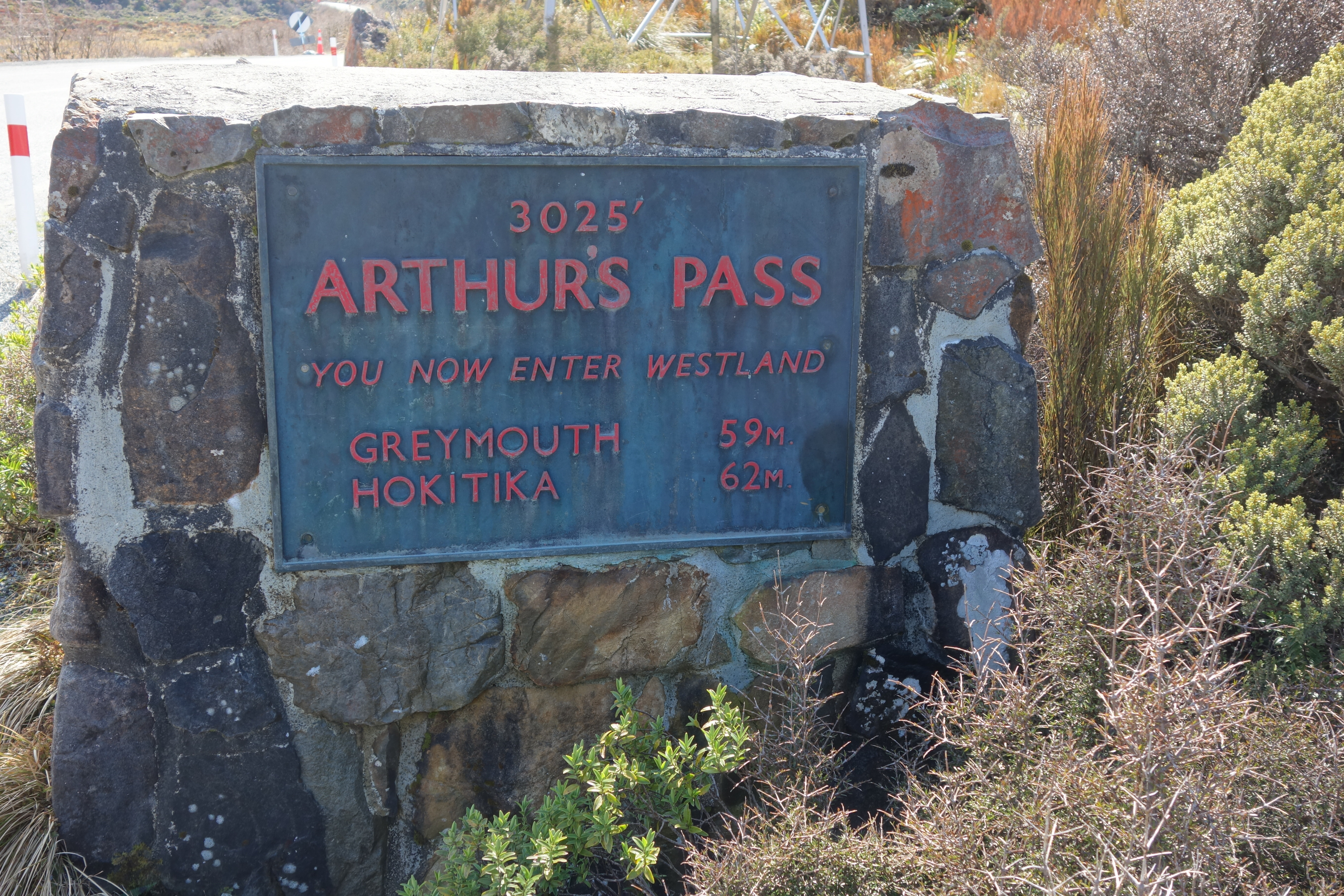
Boundary marker
