= Arthur's Pass =

Settlement in Canterbury, New Zealand

- Township
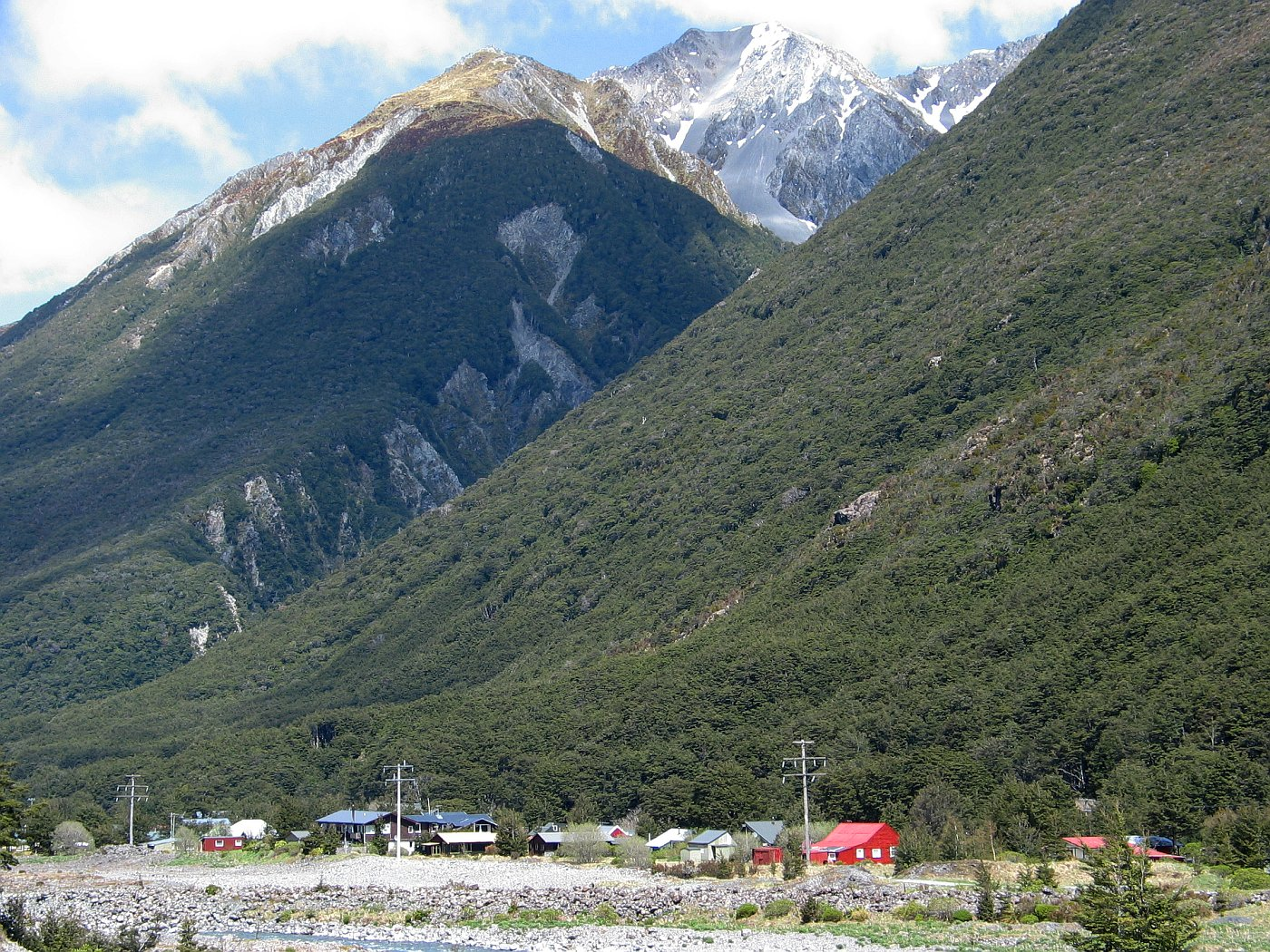
- Arthur's Pass township
- Interactive map of Arthur's Pass
- Coordinates: 42°56′43.4″S 171°33′56.4″E
- Country: New Zealand
- Region: Canterbury
- District: Selwyn
- Ward: Malvern
- Community: Malvern
- Founded: 1906 (originally named Bealey Flats)
- Electorates: Selwyn; Te Tai Tonga (Māori)

Government
  - Territorial authority: Selwyn District Council
  - Regional council: Environment Canterbury
  - Mayor of Selwyn: Lydia Gliddon
  - Selwyn MP: Nicola Grigg
  - Te Tai Tonga MP: Tākuta Ferris

Area
  - Total: 0.27 km^{2} (0.10 sq mi)
- Elevation: 739 m (2,425 ft)

Population (June 2025)
  - Total: 30
  - Density: 110/km^{2} (290/sq mi)
- Time zone: UTC+12 (NZST)
  - Summer (DST): UTC+13 (NZDT)
- Postcode: 7654
- Area code: 03
- Local iwi: Ngāi Tahu

Arthur's Pass, previously called Camping Flat then Bealey Flats, and for some time officially Arthur Pass, is a township in the Southern Alps of the South Island of New Zealand, located in the Selwyn district. It is a popular base for exploring Arthur's Pass National Park.

Arthur's Pass township is about five kilometres (3.1 mi) south of the mountain pass with the same name. At an elevation of 740 metres (2,430 ft) above sea level, the settlement is surrounded by beech forest. The Bealey River runs through the township. The town is located 153 kilometres (95 mi) from Christchurch, a two-hour drive on State Highway 73.

== Naming and history ==
The township and the pass take their names from Arthur Dudley Dobson (1841–1934, Sir Arthur from 1931). The Chief Surveyor of Canterbury Province, Thomas Cass, had asked Arthur Dobson to find out if there was a pass out of the Waimakariri watershed into valleys running to the West Coast. In 1864, Arthur's brother Edward Henry Dobson joined him and accompanied him over the watershed into the valley of the Ōtira River. A West Coast Māori chief, Tarapuhi, told Arthur of a pass that Māori hunting parties occasionally used. When Arthur returned to Christchurch, he sketched the country he had traversed and included it in a report to Cass. Arthur Dobson did not name the pass, which he found very steep on the western side. Dobson gave the name "Camping Flat" to the site that became the township.

When the West Coast gold rush began in 1864, a committee of businessmen offered a £200 prize for anyone who could find a better or more suitable pass from Canterbury over the Southern Alps to West Canterbury (the West Coast). At the same time George Dobson, (another brother), was sent to examine every available pass between the watershed of the Taramakau, Waimakariri, and the Hurunui Rivers. After examining passes at the head of every valley he reported that "Arthur's" pass was by far the most suitable for the direct crossing.

The township, at the time named Bealey Flats after Samuel Bealey, the second Superintendent of Canterbury, was originally built as a construction village for the building of the Otira Tunnel, which started on 14 January 1908. In 1909 a power station was built below the Devil's Punchbowl Falls to provide electricity for the tunnel construction and for the village itself. The railway from Christchurch reached Arthur's Pass township in 1914, the Westland section having advanced to Otira. Construction of the tunnel was very slow: it finished in 1923, and its opening was marked by the British and Intercolonial Exhibition. The TranzAlpine passenger railway service passes through Arthur's Pass and the Otira Tunnel as part of its 223-kilometre (139 mi) journey from Christchurch to Greymouth. In 2022, CNN Travel described the trip as one of the world's great train journeys.

In 1929, Arthur's Pass National Park was established by the Governor-General of New Zealand, as New Zealand's third national park. An earthquake measuring 7.1 struck Arthur's Pass on 9 March 1929. Slips closed the road to the west coast for months and there was damage to the railway lines. The earthquake was thought to have occurred due to movement along the Poulter Fault.

The Geographic Board and its predecessor had a policy of omitting possessives and apostrophes in place names. The national park was named Arthur Pass National Park in 1929 and was not officially renamed until 1980. The pass itself was renamed Arthur Pass in 1932 over the objections of Arthur Dobson himself, and the name of the township, post office and railway station was changed to "Arthur Pass" in 1951. This caused an upset with the public, and the old possessive version with the apostrophe, which was still in common use, was reinstated in 1957. On 16 September 1975, the New Zealand Post Office also adopted the spelling with the apostrophe for the post office in the township. The name is also commonly written with no apostrophe, as Arthurs Pass.

== Demographics ==
Arthur's Pass is described by Stats NZ as a rural settlement, and covers 0.27 km^{2} (0.10 sq mi). It had an estimated population of 30 as of June 2025, with a population density of 111 people per km^{2}. It is part of the statistical area of Craigieburn.

Historical population
Year	Pop.	±% p.a.
2006	75	—
2013	54	−4.58%
2018	48	−2.33%
2023	39	−4.07%

Arthurs Pass had a population of 39 in the 2023 New Zealand census, a decrease of 9 people (−18.8%) since the 2018 census, and a decrease of 15 people (−27.8%) since the 2013 census. There were 27 males and 12 females in 36 dwellings. 7.7% of people identified as LGBTIQ+. The median age was 56.9 years (compared with 38.1 years nationally). There were 6 people (15.4%) aged under 15 years, 3 (7.7%) aged 15 to 29, 21 (53.8%) aged 30 to 64, and 12 (30.8%) aged 65 or older.

People could identify as more than one ethnicity. The results were 84.6% European (Pākehā), 7.7% Māori, and 7.7% Pasifika. English was spoken by 92.3%, and other languages by 15.4%. No language could be spoken by 7.7% (e.g. too young to talk). The percentage of people born overseas was 15.4, compared with 28.8% nationally.

The sole religious affiliation given was 30.8% Christian. People who answered that they had no religion were 53.8%, and 15.4% of people did not answer the census question.

Of those at least 15 years old, 15 (45.5%) people had a bachelor's or higher degree, 9 (27.3%) had a post-high school certificate or diploma, and 6 (18.2%) people exclusively held high school qualifications. The median income was $50,500, compared with $41,500 nationally. The employment status of those at least 15 was 21 (63.6%) full-time and 3 (9.1%) part-time.

== Climate ==
Arthur's Pass township lies in a valley about 750 metres above sea level and is about 4 km south of Arthur's Pass (920 m). The town falls under the Köppen-Geiger climate classification of Cfb (Oceanic). Snowfall is not uncommon during winter, especially in the mountains above the village. The coldest temperature recorded in Arthurs Pass was −18.9 °C (−2 °F) at Bealey on 19 July 1878.

Climate data for Arthurs Pass Village (1991–2020 normals, extremes 1978–present)
Month	Jan	Feb	Mar	Apr	May	Jun	Jul	Aug	Sep	Oct	Nov	Dec	Year
Record high °C (°F)	32.1 (89.8)	29.5 (85.1)	26.4 (79.5)	22.5 (72.5)	17.6 (63.7)	14.0 (57.2)	12.8 (55.0)	14.3 (57.7)	20.0 (68.0)	22.5 (72.5)	26.2 (79.2)	27.6 (81.7)	32.1 (89.8)
Mean maximum °C (°F)	25.6 (78.1)	25.4 (77.7)	22.4 (72.3)	17.8 (64.0)	14.4 (57.9)	11.1 (52.0)	9.9 (49.8)	12.0 (53.6)	14.9 (58.8)	18.0 (64.4)	20.7 (69.3)	23.4 (74.1)	27.2 (81.0)
Mean daily maximum °C (°F)	18.3 (64.9)	18.6 (65.5)	16.1 (61.0)	12.7 (54.9)	9.7 (49.5)	6.7 (44.1)	6.0 (42.8)	7.6 (45.7)	9.8 (49.6)	11.7 (53.1)	13.9 (57.0)	16.5 (61.7)	12.3 (54.2)
Daily mean °C (°F)	13.3 (55.9)	13.4 (56.1)	11.2 (52.2)	8.3 (46.9)	5.8 (42.4)	3.0 (37.4)	2.2 (36.0)	3.5 (38.3)	5.5 (41.9)	7.3 (45.1)	9.3 (48.7)	11.8 (53.2)	7.9 (46.2)
Mean daily minimum °C (°F)	8.3 (46.9)	8.2 (46.8)	6.3 (43.3)	4.0 (39.2)	1.9 (35.4)	−0.6 (30.9)	−1.6 (29.1)	−0.7 (30.7)	1.3 (34.3)	3.0 (37.4)	4.7 (40.5)	7.2 (45.0)	3.5 (38.3)
Mean minimum °C (°F)	2.5 (36.5)	2.3 (36.1)	−0.4 (31.3)	−2.2 (28.0)	−3.9 (25.0)	−6.7 (19.9)	−7.5 (18.5)	−6.2 (20.8)	−4.5 (23.9)	−2.7 (27.1)	−1.4 (29.5)	1.3 (34.3)	−8.3 (17.1)
Record low °C (°F)	−1.0 (30.2)	−1.5 (29.3)	−8.5 (16.7)	−7.8 (18.0)	−7.5 (18.5)	−11.5 (11.3)	−12.5 (9.5)	−11.0 (12.2)	−8.2 (17.2)	−6.1 (21.0)	−5.0 (23.0)	−1.4 (29.5)	−12.5 (9.5)
Average rainfall mm (inches)	413.5 (16.28)	272.6 (10.73)	321.2 (12.65)	370.3 (14.58)	395.0 (15.55)	378.1 (14.89)	328.4 (12.93)	353.0 (13.90)	452.5 (17.81)	489.4 (19.27)	438.6 (17.27)	447.7 (17.63)	4,660.3 (183.49)
Average relative humidity (%)	77	78	82	86	88	90	88	87	84	81	78	78	83
Source 1: NIWA
Source 2: "Arthur's Pass – Weather Database"

== Facilities and points of interest ==
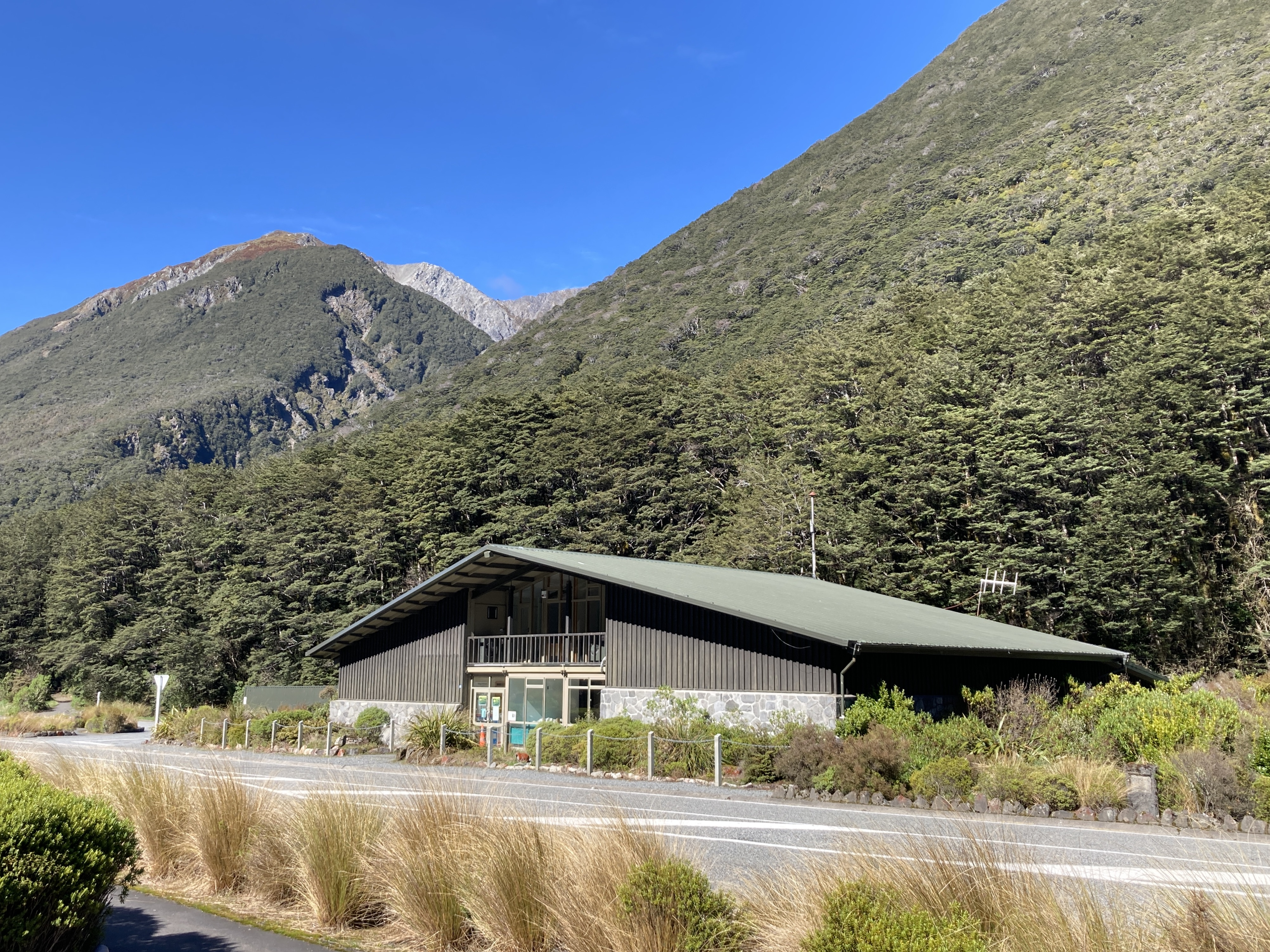
Visitor Centre (built 1959, closed 2019)

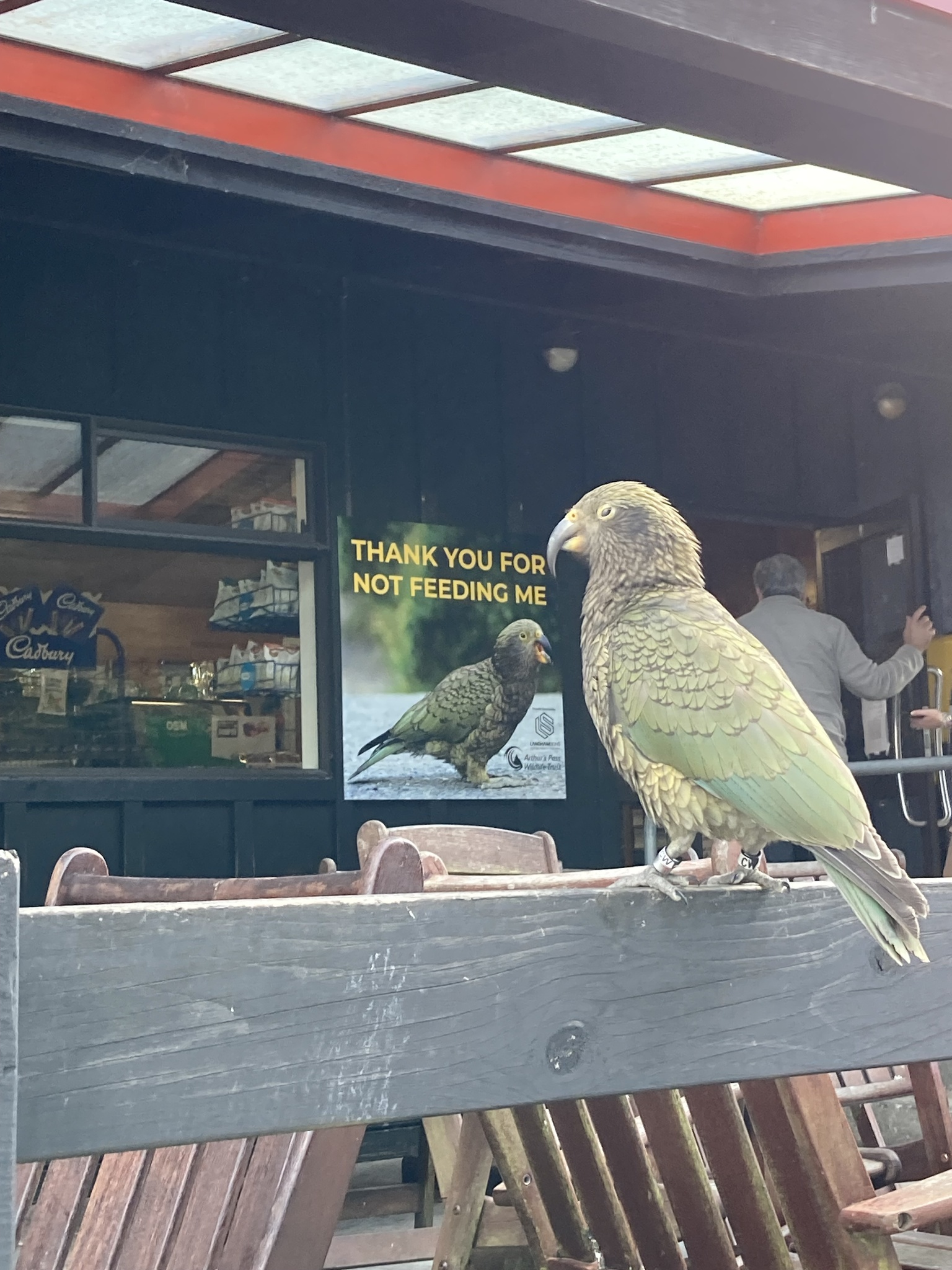
Kea at Arthur's Pass Cafe

Visitor accommodation is provided, from camp ground up to hotel standard. The township provides a general store, a petrol station, tea rooms and restaurants. Arthur's Pass is well known as a starting point for many excellent tramping tracks within the Arthur's Pass National Park. There are also several good walks from here, including the Devil's Punchbowl Falls, Bealey Valley and Avalanche Peak. The mischievous kea (New Zealand mountain parrot) can be found here.

The club skifield Temple Basin is nearby and is a popular attraction through winter.

=== Visitor centre ===
New Zealand's first national park visitor centre was built in Arthur's Pass in 1959, with the help of the Christchurch Wanderers Tramping Club. It was designed by Christchurch architect Paul Pascoe and used local stone to reflect the geology of the national park. As well as Department of Conservation offices, the building housed museum displays on the history of Arthur's Pass (including Richard Seddon's stagecoach) and archives detailing the history of the National Park. In 2019 the building was declared earthquake prone, and the visitor centre was moved to a portacabin across the road. The cost to upgrade the building to the required standard was estimated at NZ$3 million.

=== Railway station ===
The railway station at Arthur's Pass is 737 m (2,418 ft) above sea level and is the highest operational station in the South Island, and the second highest in New Zealand after National Park Station in the North Island which is 807 m (2,648 ft) above sea level. It was built in 1966 to replace an earlier station that burnt down in 1963. The station was designed in a 'chalet' or A-frame style and clad in stone and vertical wooden panelling to harmonise with the Chapel of the Snows.

=== Chapel of the Snows ===
In 1953, park ranger Ray Cleland had discussions with mountaineer Melville Glasgow and it was decided to build an interdenominational chapel at Arthur's Pass village. Paul Pascoe of Pascoe and Hall architects volunteered to draw up plans for the building, which was funded by church grants, street appeals and public contributions. Volunteers began building the chapel from local stone in October 1954. Businesses donated services and goods, and many of the interior fittings were also donated: a bell from the St Alban's fire station in Christchurch, a reed organ, and an altar cross and candlesticks made from shell cases and previously used in the chapel of the Third General Hospital of the New Zealand Division in Italy during World War 2. The chapel, which could seat 50 people, opened at Easter 1956. It is known as the Arthur's Pass Chapel or Chapel of the Snows.

=== Aninwaniwa ===
Aniwaniwa is a chalet built in 1926 as a holiday home for a Christchurch family. It is listed as a Historic Place Category 2 for its construction in local river stones, which was unusual at the time it was constructed, and it is significant as an early example of a holiday home built in permanent materials. It is not accessible to the public.

== Access ==
The town can be reached by The TranzAlpine express train on the Midland Line. The township is situated on State Highway 73, which connects the West Coast to Christchurch and Canterbury in the east via Arthur's Pass in the Southern Alps.

Buildings

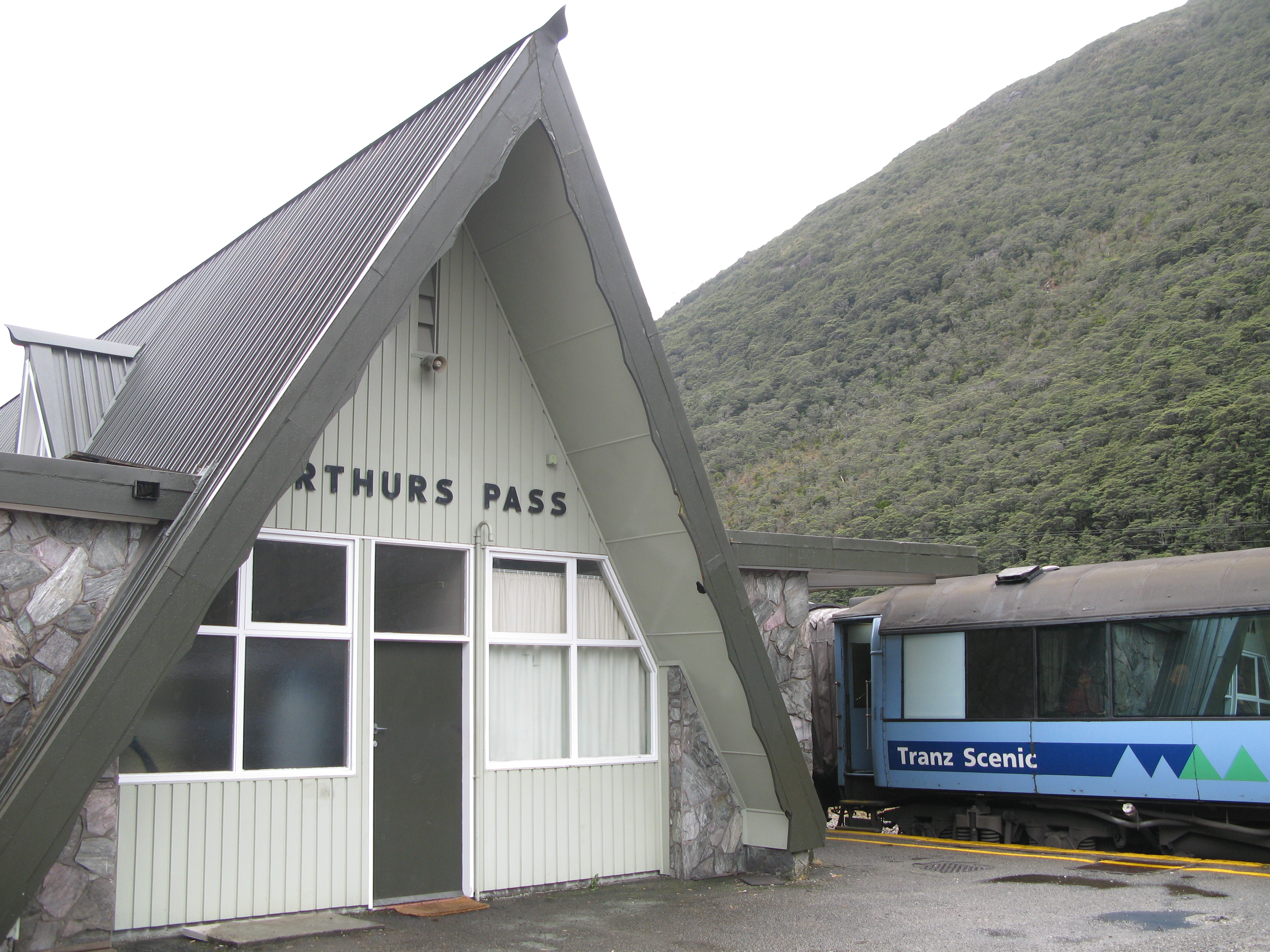
Train station

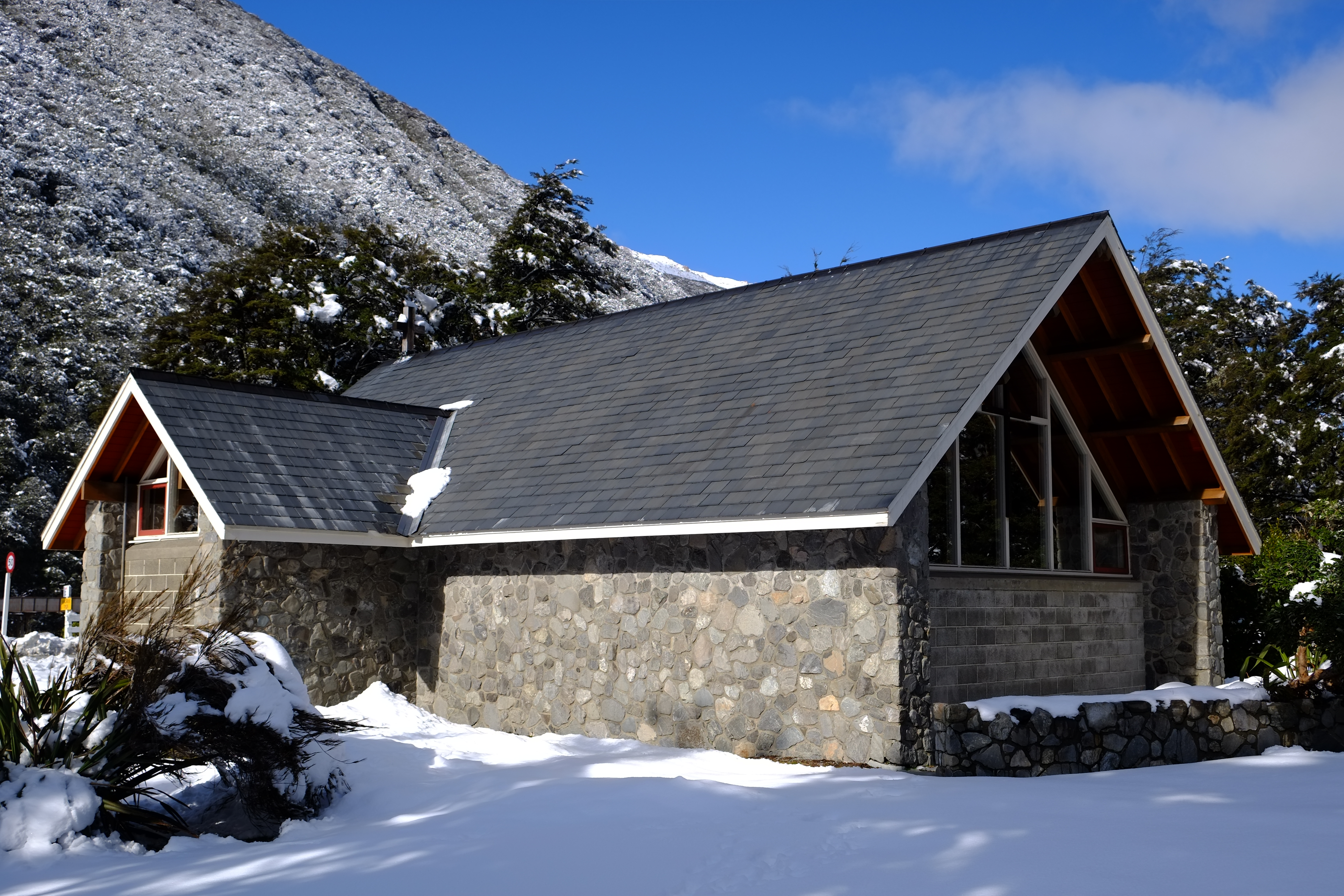
Arthur's Pass Chapel (opened 1956)

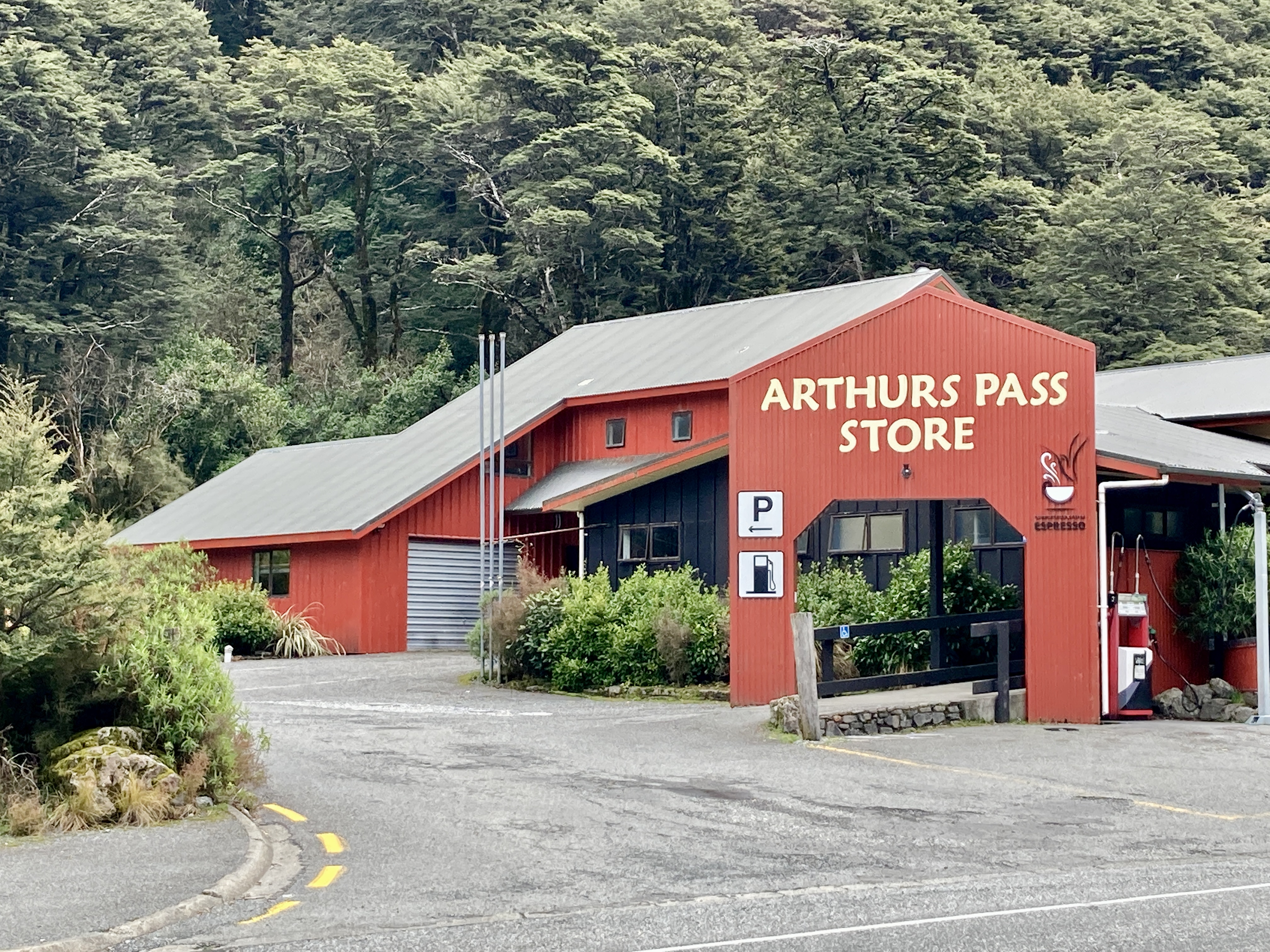
Arthur's Pass Store

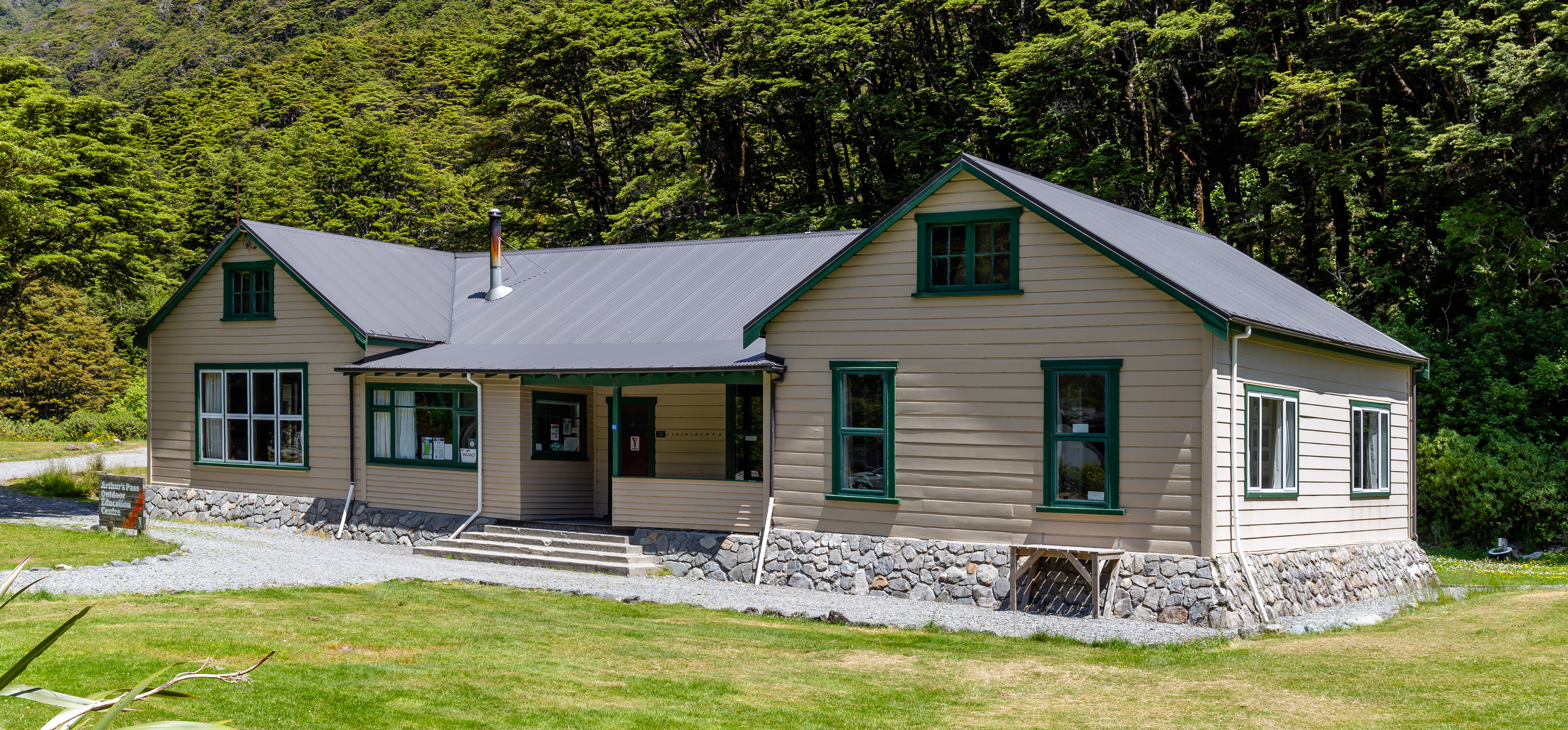
Outdoor Education Centre

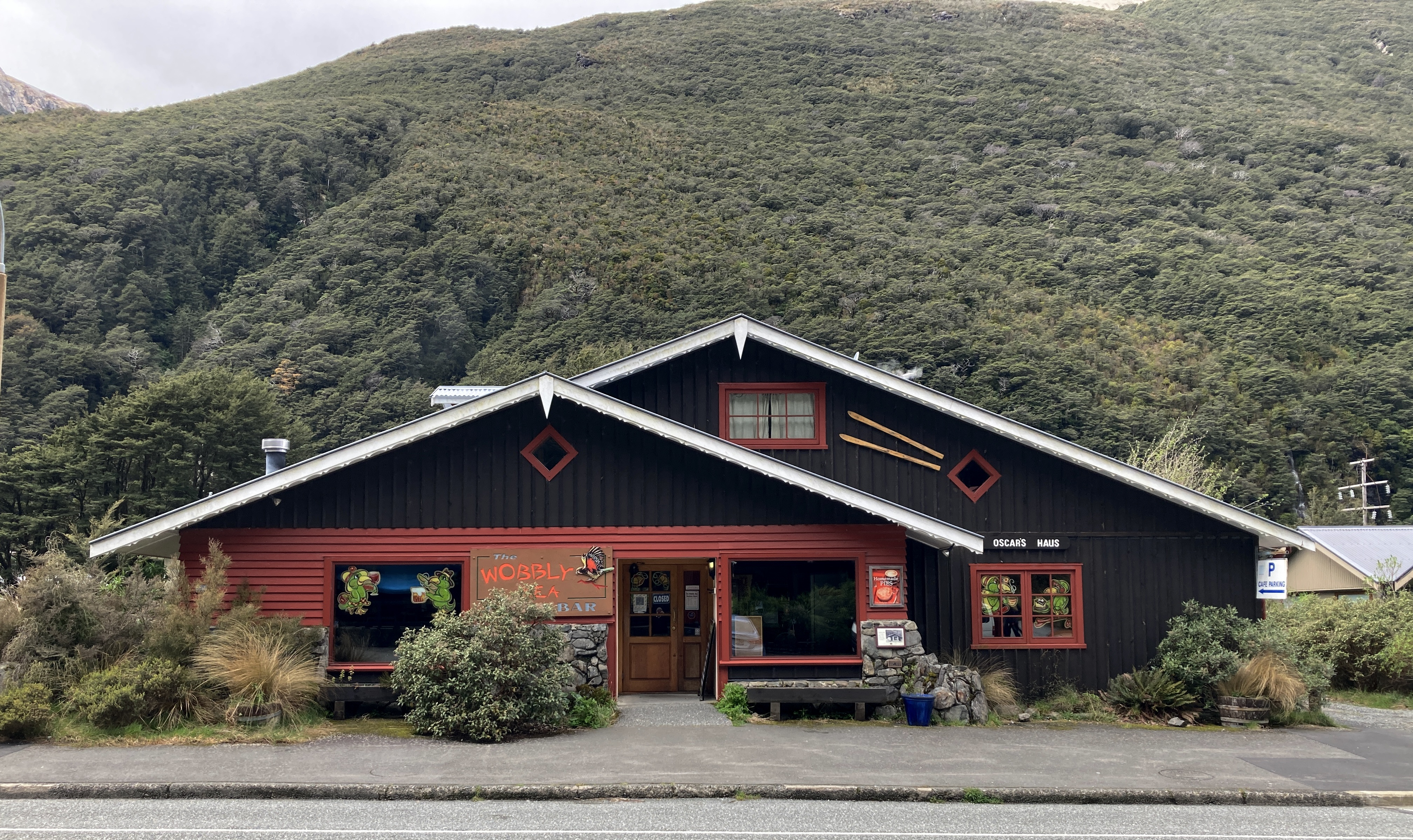
Wobbly Kea Cafe, now named The Alpine Parrot

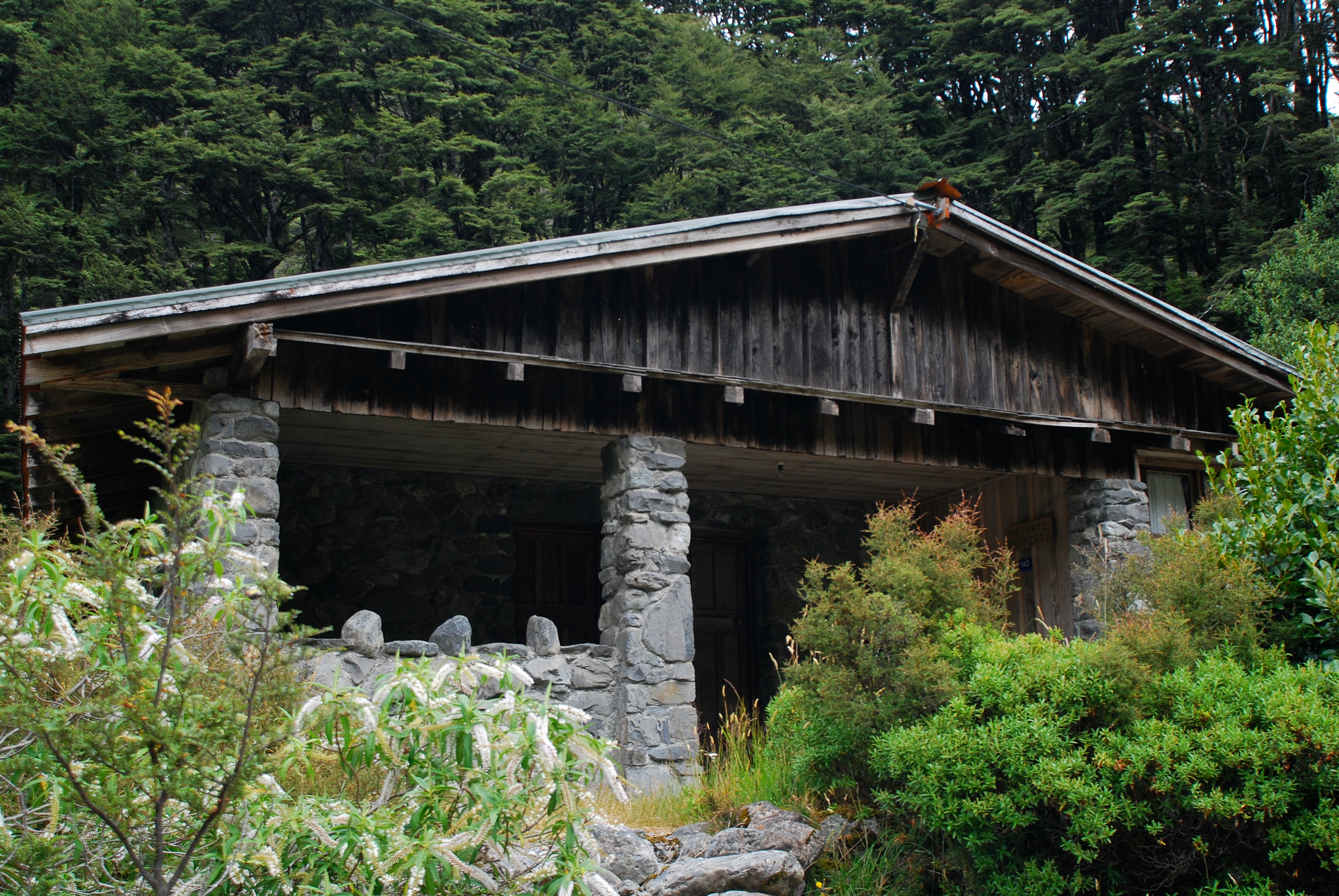
Aniwaniwa, historic chalet

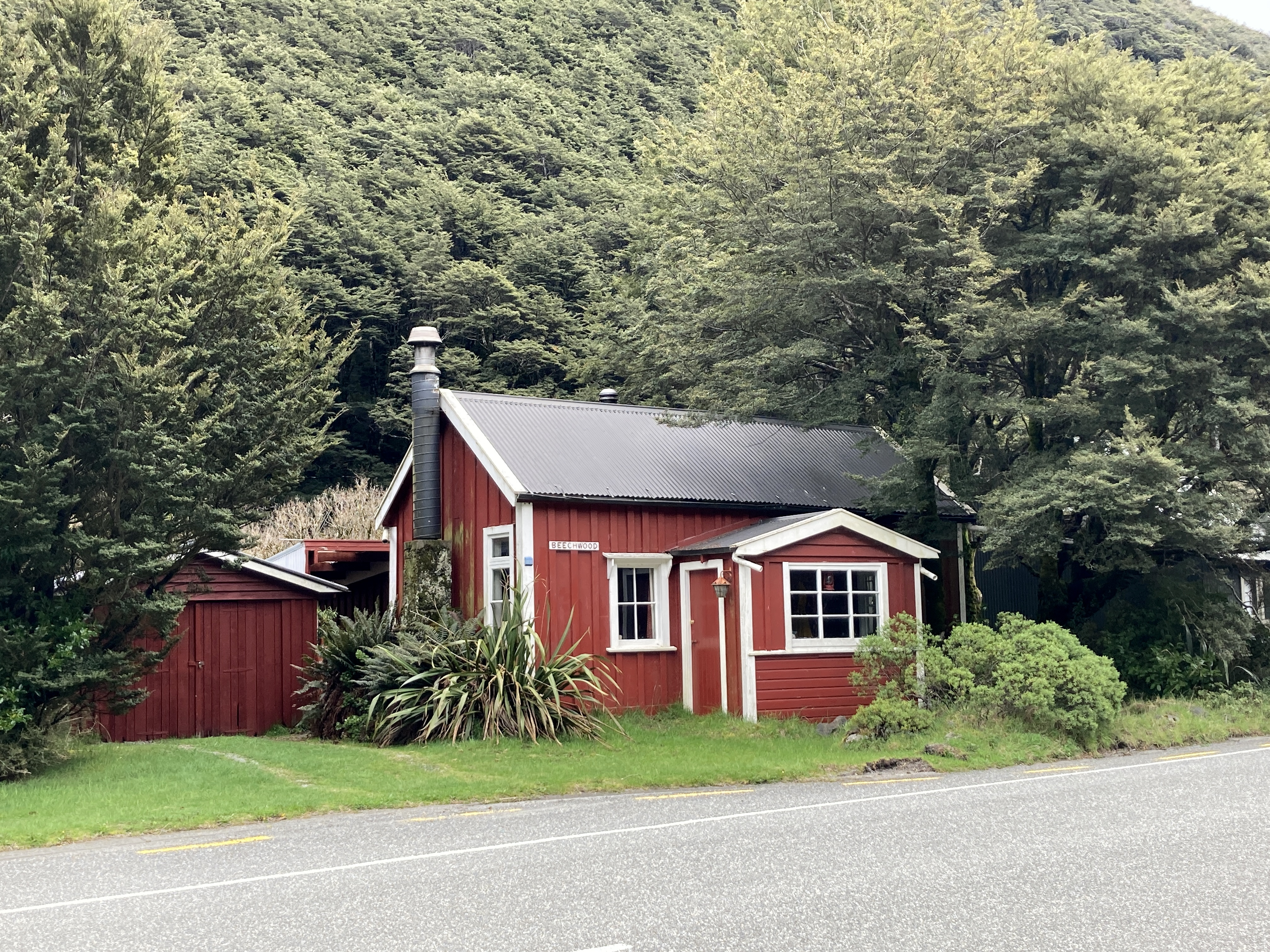
Typical cottage
