= Lake Kaurapataka =

Lake in the South Island of New Zealand

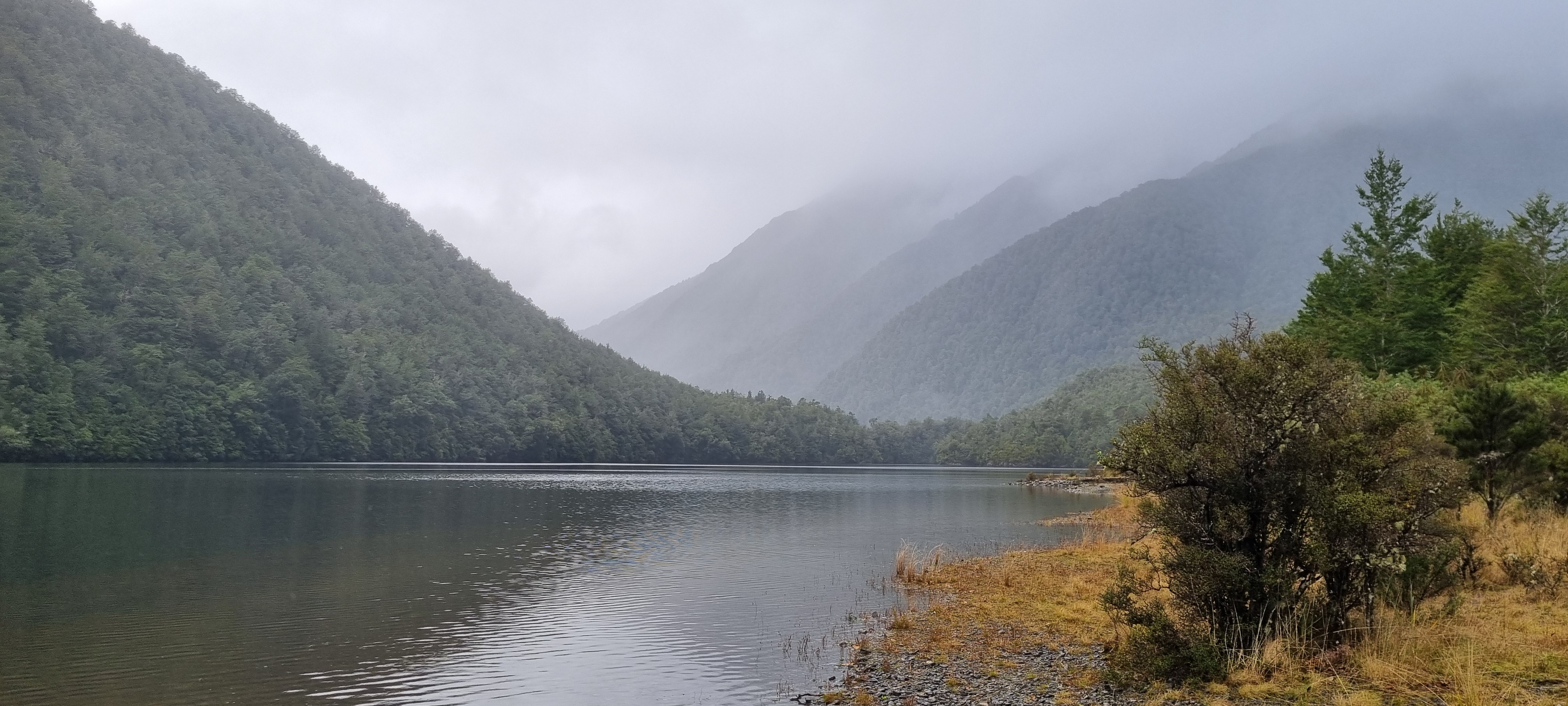
- Lake Kaurapataka
- Interactive map of Lake Kaurapataka
- Location: Westland District, West Coast, South Island
- Coordinates: 42°47′09″S 171°41′47″E
- Primary outflows: Lake Creek
- Surface area: 34.9 ha (86 acres)
- Max. depth: 24.2 m (79 ft)
- Surface elevation: 410 m (1,350 ft)

Lake Kaurapataka (or Lake Kāurupātaka), is a small lake in the West Coast region of the South Island of New Zealand. The lake is adjacent to the Southern Alps, and lies within the northern boundary of Arthur's Pass National Park, to the south of the Taramakau River. The surface area of the lake is 34.9 ha (86 acres) and it has a maximum depth of 24.2 m (79 ft). The lake is surrounded by native forest, and is described by Our Lakes our Future as being in pristine condition.

The lake was not included within the initial boundaries of the Arthur's Pass National Park, but the boundaries were adjusted to include the lake, following recommendations in 1931 from the Board of Control, who noted that "it is considered an exceptionally fine piece of scenery".

Long term trends and changes in the flora in area surrounding the lake can be inferred from analysis of pollen, charcoal and algae in sediment cores. The analysis indicates that the catchment area of the lake has been stable for at least 1,200 years. The native forest surrounding the lake is dominated by species of beech, but there are also podocarps and tree ferns, and species of small trees and shrubs. The sediment cores show deposits of charcoal that are indicative of fire associated with Māori settlement, and then later European settlement in the wider region.

The lake has a population of large New Zealand longfin eels. These eels are fully protected under New Zealand law. The great crested grebe (pūteketeke) was reported to be resident at the lake in 1926.

Access to the lake is via a route classified as an "Expert route" by the Department of Conservation, requiring multiple river crossings. The route starts at the Aickens car park beside State Highway 73, approximately 5 km (3.1 mi) west of the Ōtira settlement. The Lake Kaurapataka track branches off the Te Araroa Trail as it passes through the Taramakau River valley, turning south into the Pfeifer Creek valley. After 1.7 km, it then follows Lake Creek east, and continues along the south shore of Lake Kaurapataka. From the eastern end of the lake, the track descends steeply into the Otehake River valley, where it ends at the junction with the Otehake River route.
