= Rolleston River =

River in the South Island of New Zealand

- Route of the Rolleston River
- Mouth of the Rolleston River Rolleston River (South Island)

Location
- Country: New Zealand

Physical characteristics
- Source: Southern Alps
  - coordinates: 42.8946°S 171.502°E
- Mouth
  - location: Ōtira River
  - coordinates: 42°51′19″S 171°33′24″E
- Length: 9 kilometres (5.6 mi)

Basin features
- Progression: Rolleston River → Ōtira River → Taramakau River → Tasman Sea
- Tributaries
  - left: Holts Creek

The Rolleston River is a river of the West Coast Region of New Zealand's South Island. It flows north from its origins on the northern slopes of Mount Rolleston before turning northeast to reach the Ōtira River five kilometres north of Arthur's Pass.

== See also ==
- List of rivers of New Zealand
