= Harper Pass =

Gap in New Zealand

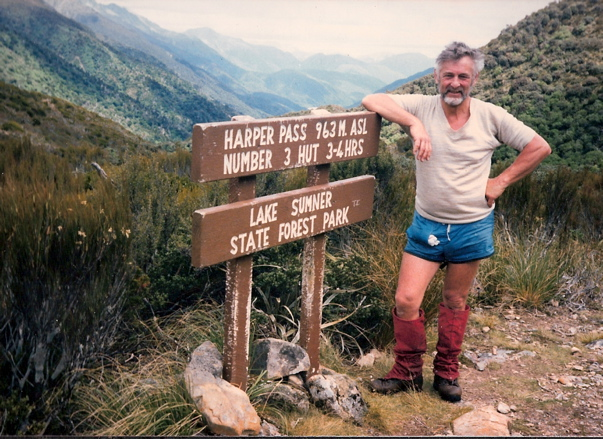
- Tramper John Gates at the pass in 1985
- Interactive map of Harper Pass
- Elevation: 962 metres (3,156 ft)
- Traversed by: Harper Pass Track; part of Te Araroa

Third Approach
- Location: New Zealand
- Range: Southern Alps / Kā Tiritiri o te Moana
- Coordinates: 42°43′40.8″S 171°52′58.2″E

Harper Pass (elevation 962 metres or 3,156 feet), previously known as Hurunui Pass or sometimes Taramakau Pass, is an alpine pass between Canterbury and the West Coast in New Zealand. It was the most important crossing for Māori to obtain pounamu. The first European crossed the pass in 1857 and the leader of the second party later that year, Leonard Harper, gave the pass its current name. It was of some interest to the settlers as the West Coast was part of Canterbury Province and it remained the only feasible route for some years. When the West Coast gold rush started in 1864, it became a heavily used crossing and remained so until October 1865, when a dray road over Arthur's Pass opened. The Arthur's Pass route was upgraded in March 1866 to coach traffic standard, and the much less direct route over Harper Pass fell out of use. It was restored in the 1930s as a tramping route and the Harper Pass Track, a four or five-day tramp, is today part of Te Araroa over its entire length.

== History ==
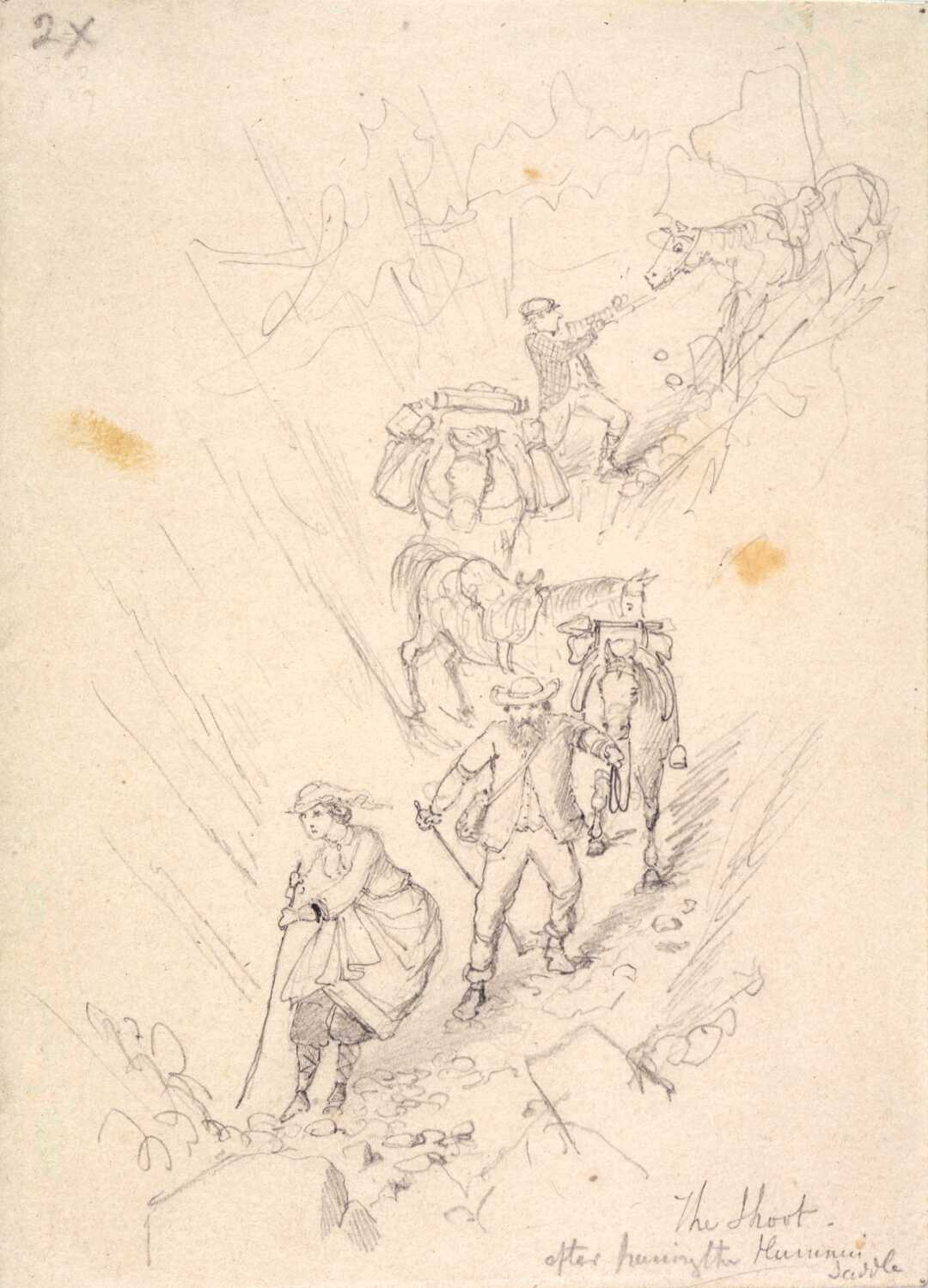
The shoot after passing the Hurunui Saddle; 1866 pencil sketch by Nicholas Chevalier

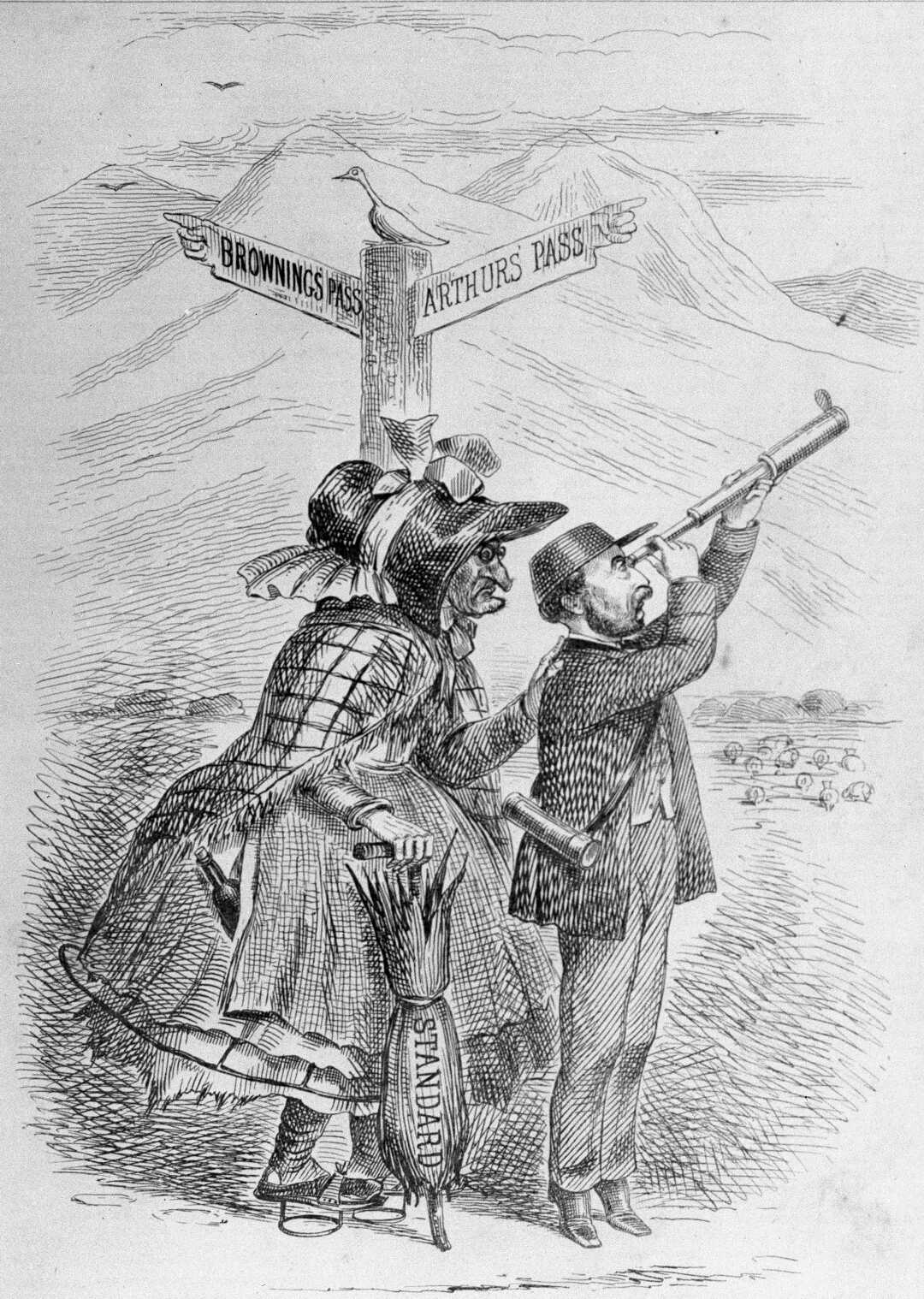
In search for a better alpine crossing to Harper Pass, the public was in favour of Browning Pass, but John Hall favoured Arthur's Pass; he was backed by the Canterbury Standard

The pass was the most important route across the Southern Alps / Kā Tiritiri o te Moana for Māori to obtain pounamu (greenstone) from the West Coast; the pass received only seasonal use. To Māori, the pass was known by either name of the rivers that flow from it: the Taramakau River on the western side and the Hurunui River on the east.

The first Europeans went over the pass in 1857. In September of that year, Edward Dobson led a party consisting of the surveyor Joseph Taylor, Mr Mason, and Christopher Edward Dampier over the pass. They went only a short distance past the saddle before they were stopped by four days of bad weather, after which they returned to the Hurunui River. Dobson misjudged the height of the pass (he thought it to be about 1,000 feet or 300 metres high) and the West Coast river that they encountered (he thought he had entered the Brunner River, now known as the Arahura River, which is 50 kilometres or 31 miles further south-west). On 4 November 1857, just two months later, Leonard Harper set off from Mr. Mason's station on the Waitohi River to also cross the pass; he had Mr Loch with him and four Māori from Kaiapoi. Once they reached the Taramakau, they encountered flooding and built a mogihi (a raft made from flax stalks). They reached the West Coast 23 days after setting off, and took 14 days for the return journey to Mr. Mason's farm. But before they returned, they travelled along the coast as far south as the Waitangitāhuna River (i.e. just north of the Ōkārito Lagoon). The party returned to Christchurch in January 1858. Since that expedition, the pass has been called Harper Pass.

After gold was discovered in May 1861 in Otago, the search for gold in Canterbury also started, with the Canterbury Provincial Council offering a NZ£1,000 reward for discovery of gold in a "locality reasonably accessible to Christchurch". The provincial geologist, Julius von Haast, searched in South Canterbury, whilst efforts were made to make the West Coast more accessible; at the time, the West Coast was still part of Canterbury. On behalf of the provincial government, Charlton Howitt was prospecting in the Hurunui River and he and his team cut a track to Harper Pass. In March 1863, after a surveyor pointed to the geological similarities between the Hokitika valley and gold fields in Victoria in Australia, the provincial government decided that a better travel connection to the West Coast must be found urgently. Further work on the track over Harper Pass was commissioned. Howitt was stationed at Lake Brunner for track work there but he and two of his man drowned in the lake in June 1863.

After little payable gold had been found on the West Coast, the provincial government sent orders in August 1864 that all work on the track over Harper Pass was to cease, and that depots on the West Coast were to shut down. Five days before the orders arrived, one of the track cutters—Albert Hunt—found payable gold. This finally initiated the West Coast gold rush. The fury hit Christchurch in February 1865, when a report of 2,375 ounces (67.3 kg) having been shipped to Nelson from the West Coast was circulated. Over the next three weeks, some 2,500 diggers made their way over Harper Pass. The 170 miles (270 km) journey from Christchurch to the mouth of the Taramakau River was described as such:

The first third was by dray road on which coaches could travel; a third was of steady climbing, difficult only for a few miles below the pass; but the last third was hazardous, involving a precipitous descent and a dangerous river crossing on the journey down the gorge of the Taramakau.

The track became so bad that by the end of March 1865, the provincial government advised against using the route, although it was the only feasible route from Christchurch to the West Coast at the time. Thus started a search for a better route over the Southern Alps and Dobson, within months, decided that a route explored by his son Arthur Dobson was preferred: Arthur's Pass. By October 1865, a rough track over Arthur's Pass opened for drays. From then on, use of Harper Pass declined. On 20 March 1866, the road over Arthur's Pass opened for coach traffic and this was then a much more convenient route and use of Harper Pass for transport purposes ceased.

== Tramping ==
In the 1930s, the New Zealand government had an initiative to re-establish the track as an alternative to the popular Milford Track in Fiordland. Some huts were built at the time.

The Department of Conservation maintains the route and advertises it as a tramp (hike) over Harper Pass to be done over four to five days. Trampers need to be self-sufficient as the area is remote and prone to flooding. It is recommended to start on the West Coast as the route along the Taramakau River relies on low river levels, thus having the benefit of a reliable forecast. The tramp starts at Aickens on State Highway 73, as a footbridge gives access across the Ōtira River just upstream from its confluence with the Taramakau. Beyond Harper Pass, the track follows the Hurunui River to Lake Sumner. The track then follows the Hope River to State Highway 7. The entire route of the Harper Pass Track is part of Te Araroa.
