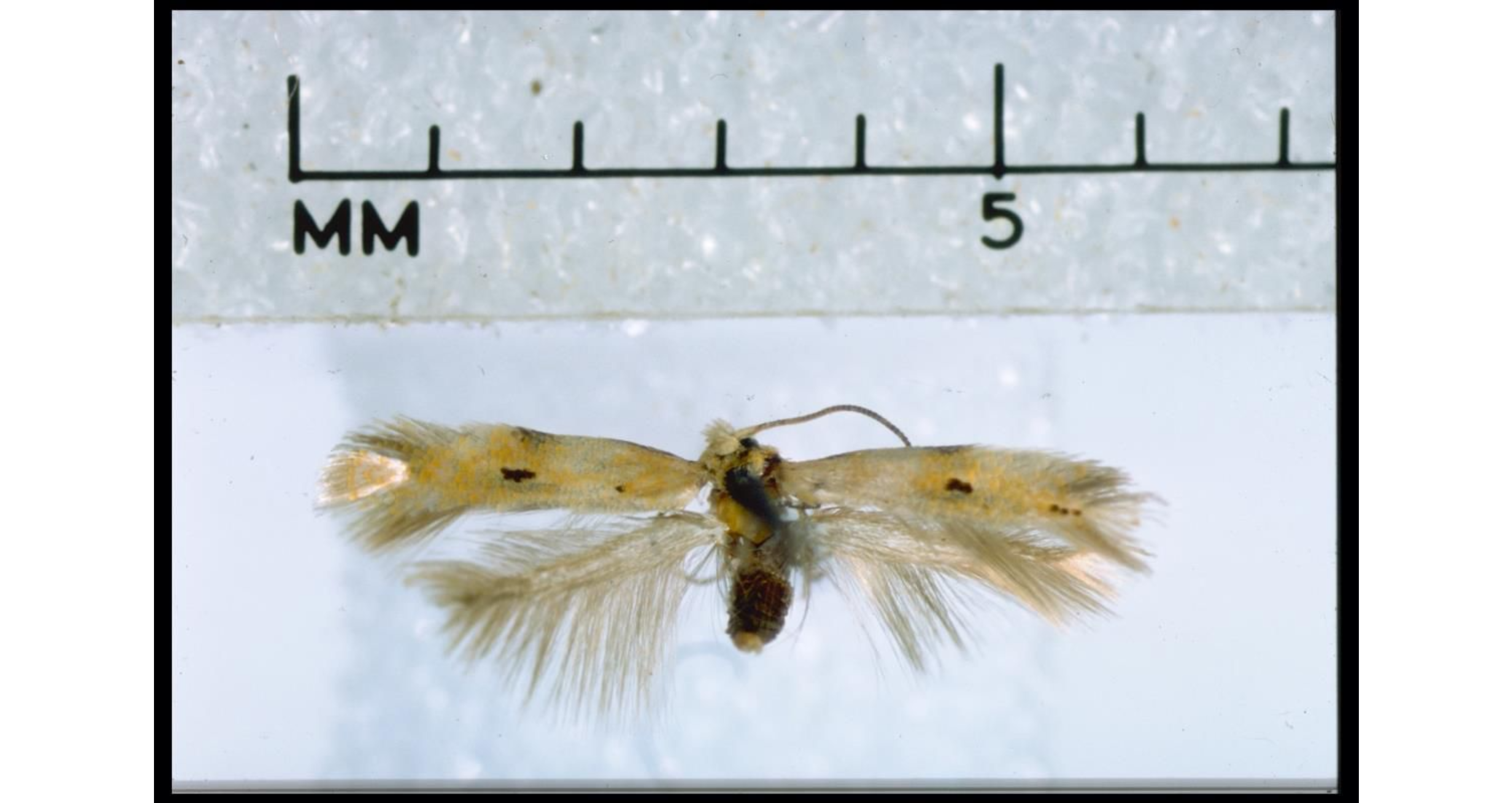

Scientific classification
- Kingdom: Animalia
- Phylum: Arthropoda
- Class: Insecta
- Order: Lepidoptera
- Family: Nepticulidae
- Genus: Stigmella
- Species: S. insignis

Binomial name
- Stigmella insignis (Philpott, 1927)

Synonyms
- Nepticula insignis Philpott, 1927

= Stigmella insignis =

Species of moth endemic to New Zealand

Stigmella insignis is a moth of the family Nepticulidae. It is endemic to New Zealand and has been observed in the Hawkes Bay as well as in the north west of the South Island. S. insignis inhabits montane to subalpine grasslands. The larvae of S. insignis are leaf miners. They likely feed on Celmisia spectabilis. Adults of this species have been observed on the wing in March, November and December.

== Taxonomy ==
This species was first described by Alfred Philpott in 1927 using three male specimens he collected at Salisbury's Opening on the Mount Arthur Tableland at 4,000 ft. in November. Philpott originally named the species Nepticula insignis. In 1939 George Hudson discussed and illustrated this species under that name in his book A supplement to the butterflies and moths of New Zealand. In 1988 J. S. Dugdale placed this species in the genus Stigmella. This placement was confirmed by Hans Donner and Christopher Wilkinson in 1989. The male holotype specimen is held in the New Zealand Arthropod Collection.

== Description ==
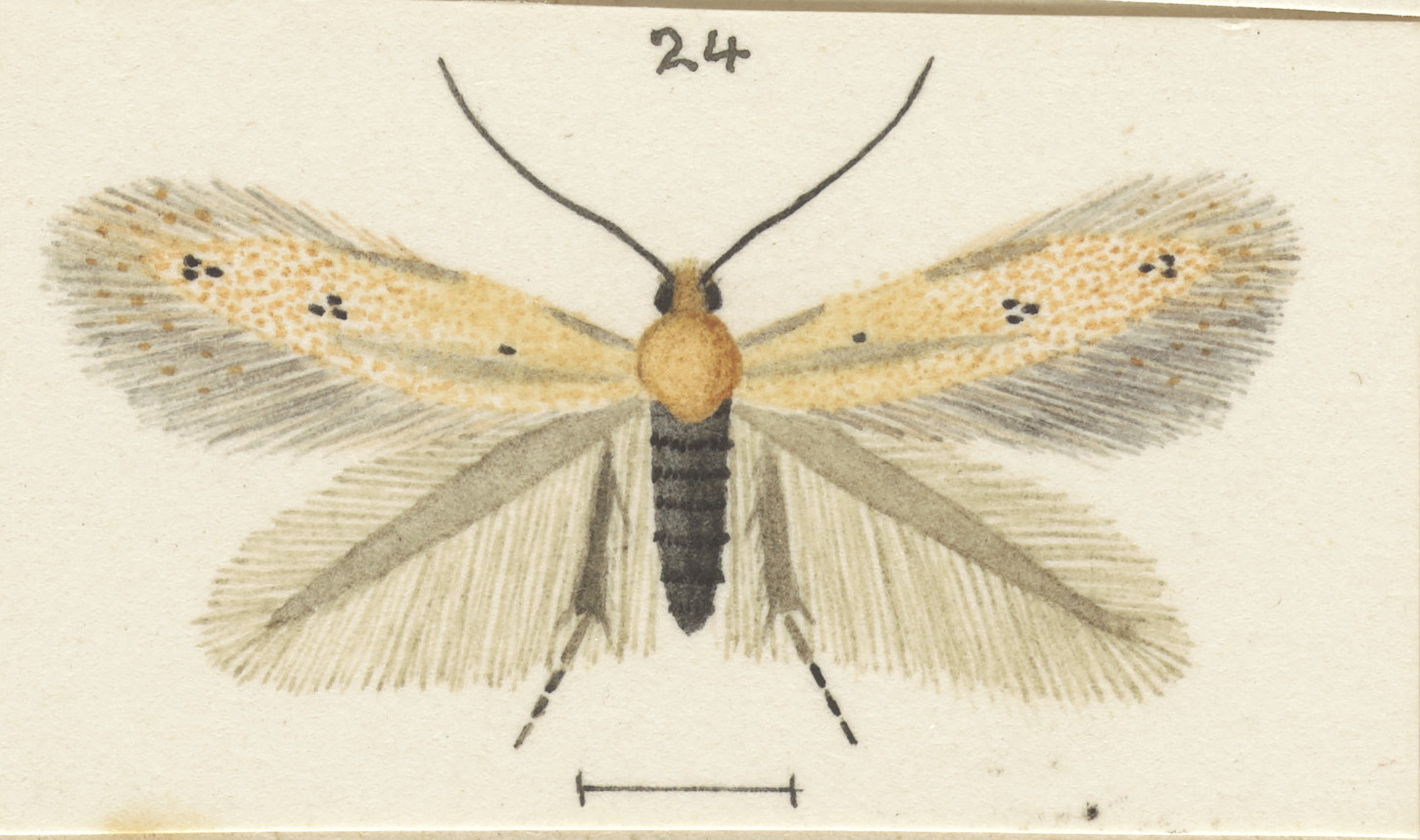
Illustration of male S. insignis by George Hudson.

Philpott described this species as follows:

n. sp. ♂. 5–6 mm Head white, sometimes ochreous tinged. Antennae fuscous, eye-cap whitish. Thorax ochreous. Abdomen dark fuscous. Forewings white with much admixture of ochreous, especially on basal portion and in disc; a black spot on fold at ¼, sometimes absent; a prominent black spot in disc at ½,. usually elongate; a black spot, large or small, before apex; fringes fuscous-grey with several rows of ochreous points round apex and termen. Hindwings and fringes fuscous-grey.

Donner and Wilkinson described the male of the species as follows:

Head. Frontal tuft, scape, and collar white; antenna grey-brown, comprising about 35 segments, lustrous, reflecting purple and copper. Thorax silvery white. Forewing about 3.5 mm long, silvery white with scattered yellow scales; a small, postbasal black spot sometimes extending caudally and anally, and a distal black spot varying from almost absent to covering terminal fifth of wing; fringe silvery grey. Hindwing silvery grey; fringe concolorous. Abdomen silvery brown.

The female is visually similar to the male with the exception of their antenna which have 28 segments. S. insignis is larger than the similar species S. oriastra and lacks the orange forewing scales of S. laqueorum.

== Distribution ==
This species is endemic to New Zealand. This species has been observed in the Hawkes Bay as well as in the north west of the South Island.

== Behaviour ==
Adults have been recorded in March, November and December.

== Habitat and hosts ==
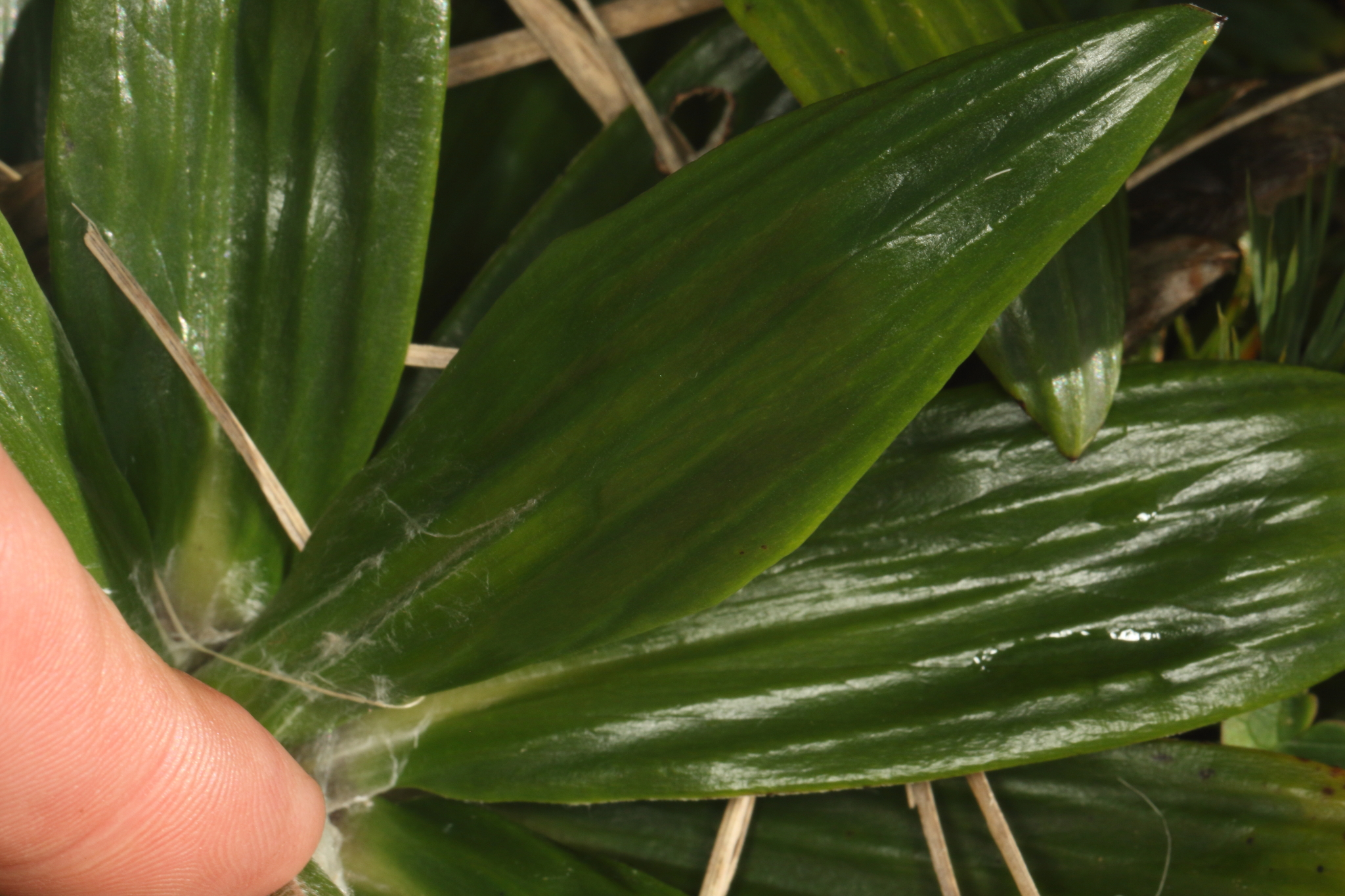
Leaves of likely host species C. spectabilis.

S. insignis inhabits montane to subalpine grasslands. The larvae probably feed on Celmisia spectabilis. J. S. Dugdale stated he collected specimens on the rosettes of C. spectabilis. They mine the leaves of their host plant.
