= Glenrae =

Glenrae may refer to:

- Glenrae River, a river in New Zealand
- Glenrae, Queensland, a locality in the North Burnett Region, Queensland, Australia
