= Taipo River =

River in Westland District, New Zealand

Coordinates: 42°45′S 171°23′E

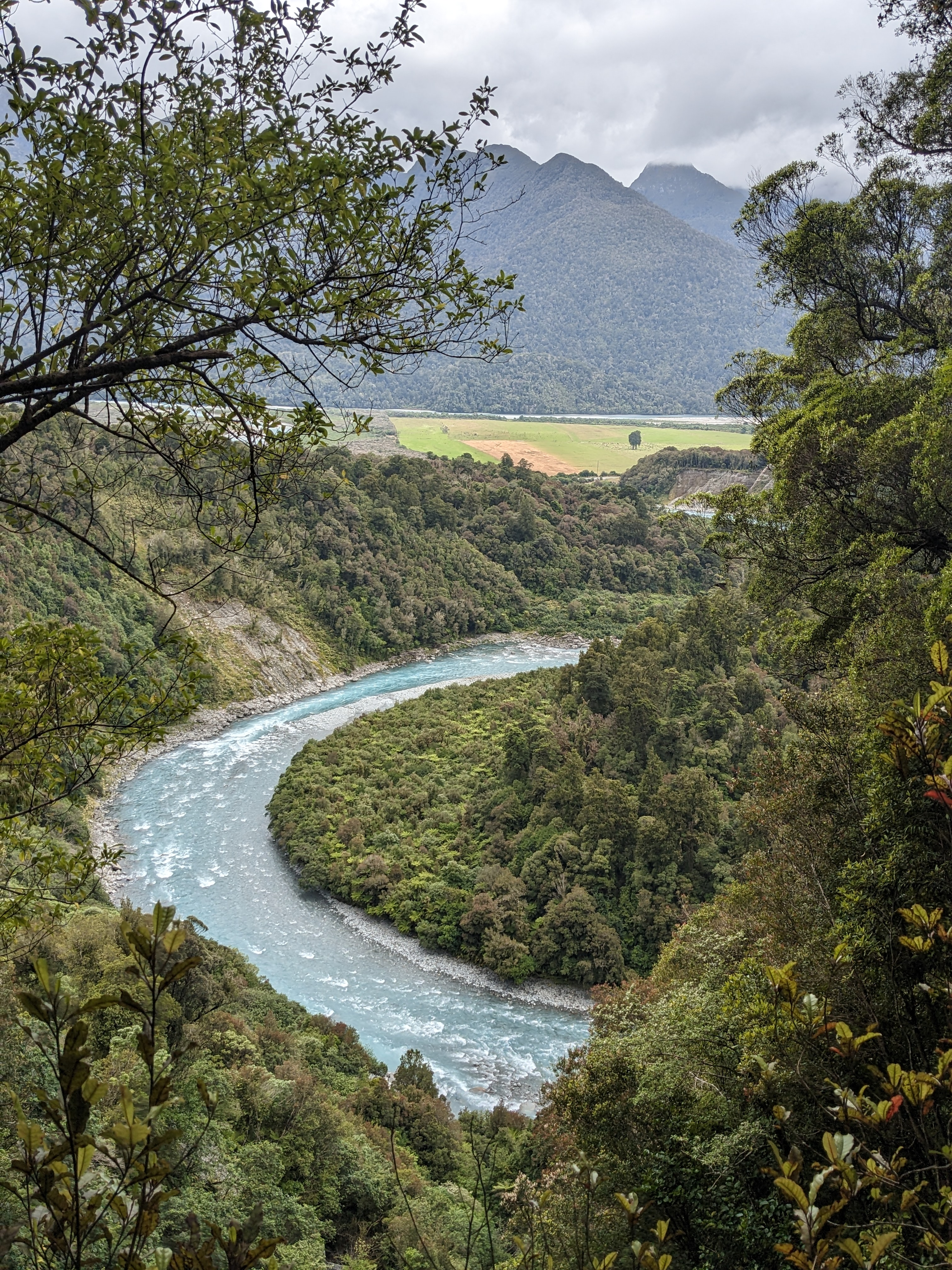
- Taipo River near SH7

Location
- Country: New Zealand

Physical characteristics
- Source
  - location: Southern Alps
- Mouth
  - location: Taramakau River
- Length: 25 km (16 mi)

The Taipo River is a river of the central West Coast Region of New Zealand's South Island. It flows north from its sources west of Mount Rolleston, fed by the waters of several mountain streams. After some 15 kilometres it turns northeast to flow past the Bald Range before reaching the valley of the Taramakau River into which it flows 35 kilometres east of Hokitika.

== See also ==
- List of rivers of New Zealand
