= Mandamus (disambiguation) =

Mandamus may refer to:

- Mandamus, a legal term
  - Peremptory writ of mandamus
  - Continuing Mandamus
- Mandamus River in New Zealand
- Levular Mandamus, character in Robots and Empire by Isaac Asimov
