= Eastern Hohonu River =

Location
- Country: New Zealand

Physical characteristics
- Source
  - location: Hohonu Range
- Mouth
  - location: Lake Brunner
  - coordinates: 42°36′40″S 171°24′54″E
- Length: 16 km (9.9 mi)

The Eastern Hohonu River is a river of New Zealand. It rises in the Hohonu Range, an outlying range of the Southern Alps 28 kilometres southeast of Greymouth, flowing north then east before reaching its outflow into Lake Brunner. It is named the Eastern Hohonu River to differentiate it from the nearby Big Hohonu River, which is also called the Greenstone River.

== See also ==
- List of rivers of New Zealand
