= Little Hohonu River =

Coordinates: 42°38′S 171°18′E

Location
- Country: New Zealand

Physical characteristics
- Source
  - location: Hohonu Range
- Mouth
  - location: Big Hohonu River

The Little Hohonu River is a river of New Zealand's West Coast Region. It flows northwest from its origins in the Hohonu Range southwest of Lake Brunner, reaching the Greenstone River / Hokonui 20 kilometres southeast of Greymouth.

== See also ==
- List of rivers of New Zealand
