= Hurunui River South Branch =

River in New Zealand

Coordinates: 42°45′10.8″S 171°56′24″E

The Hurunui River South Branch is a river in the Hurunui District of Canterbury, New Zealand.

The river originates in the Crawford Range, with southern tributaries flowing from the Dampier Range. One of the inflows on the true-left is Mason Stream, which flows through Lake Mason. One of the larger inflows on the true-right is the North Esk River. The only bridge over the Hurunui River South Branch is part of Lake Sumner Road shortly before the river's confluence into the Hurunui River.
