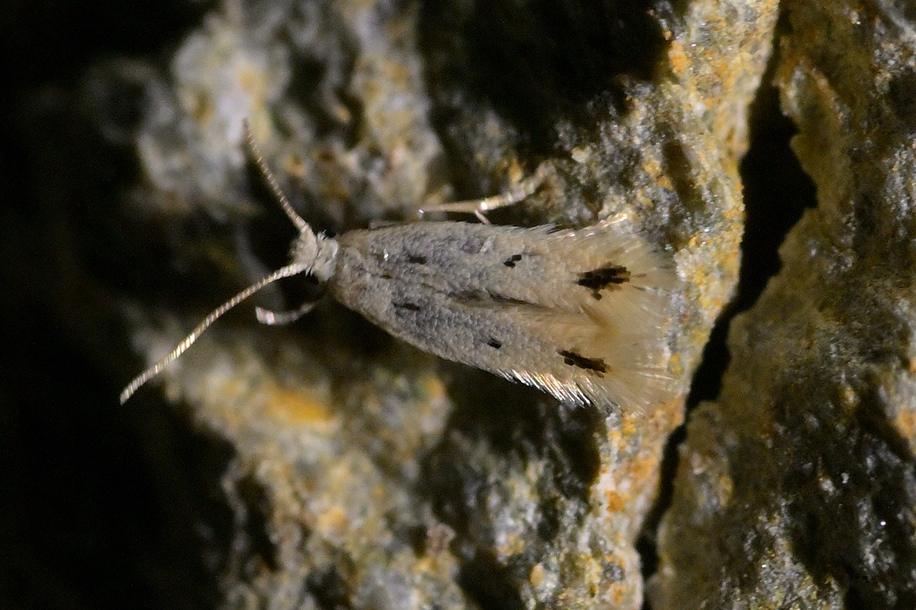

Scientific classification
- Kingdom: Animalia
- Phylum: Arthropoda
- Class: Insecta
- Order: Lepidoptera
- Family: Nepticulidae
- Genus: Stigmella
- Species: S. oriastra

Binomial name
- Stigmella oriastra (Meyrick, 1917)

Synonyms
- Nepticula oriastra Meyrick, 1917

= Stigmella oriastra =

Species of moth

Stigmella oriastra is a moth of the family Nepticulidae. This species was first described by Edward Meyrick. It is endemic to New Zealand and is found in the South Island. The larvae are leaf miners of Celmisia species, including Celmisia coriacea and Celmisia densiflora. They have been recorded in February, April and May. Adults are on the wing in January and from October to December. Adults run and takes rapid short flights. There is likely one generation per year.

== Taxonomy ==
This species was originally described by Edward Meyrick in 1917 using two specimens collected at Ōtira Gorge by Stella Hudson on scree on the eastern side of the gorge and originally named Nepticula oriastra. In 1928 George Hudson discussed and illustrated that species under the name Nepticula oriastra in his book The butterflies and moths of New Zealand. In 1988 John S. Dugdale placed Nepticula oriastra in the genus Stigmella. In 1989 Hans Donner and Christopher Wilkinson agreed with this placement in their monograph on New Zealand Nepticulidae. This placement was again confirmed in a 2016 revision of the global species placed in the family Nepticulidae. The female lectotype specimen is held at the Natural History Museum, London.

== Description ==
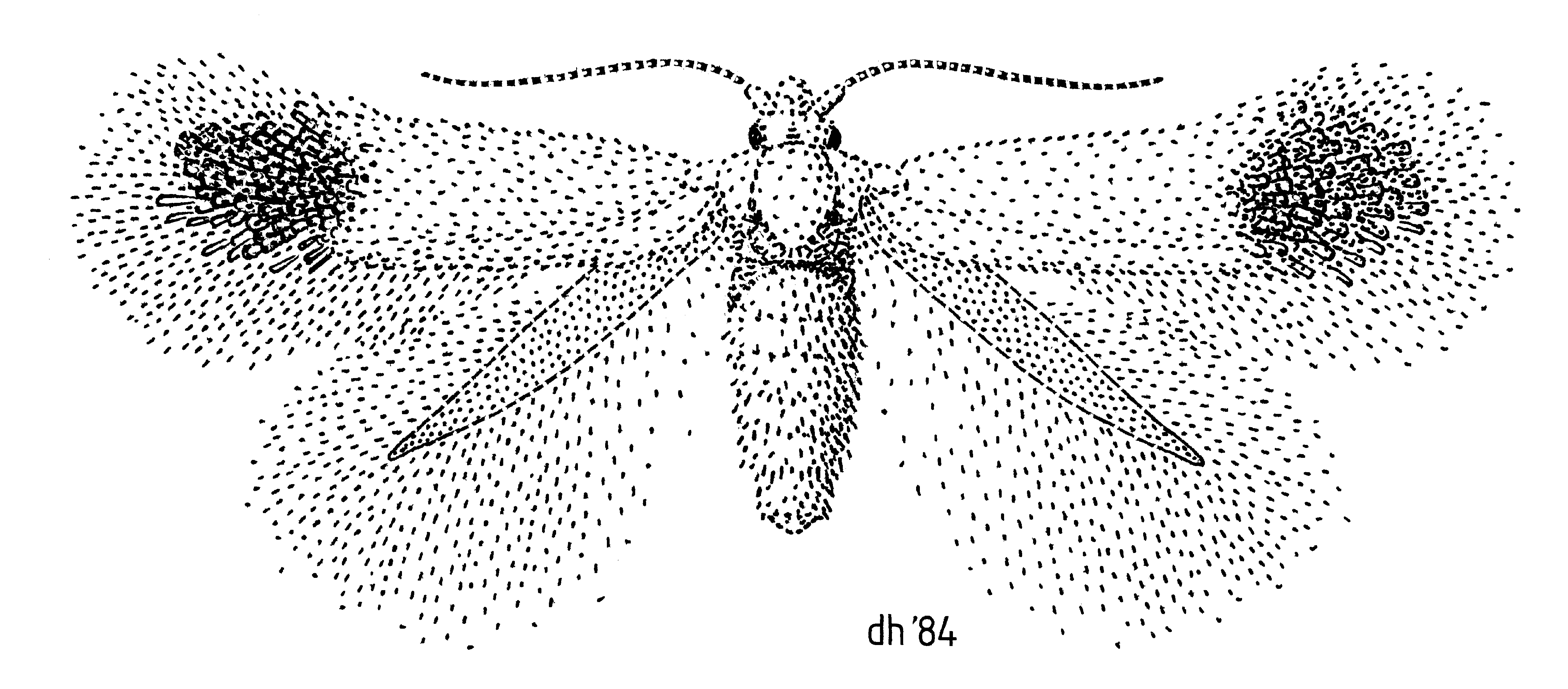
Illustration by Des Helmore

Larvae are 3–4 mm long and pale yellow. The mine is a narrow and initially forms a circular pattern and then a linear pattern. Frass can be seen in the middle of the mine. The cocoon is buff and spun among debris on the ground.

Meyrick described the female adult of this species as follows:

♀. 6 mm. Head, antennae, thorax, and abdomen ochreous- white. Forewings lanceolate; ochreous-white; a small black dot on fold before 1/3 of wing; apical third of wing blackish : cilia ochreous-white, base dark grey. Hindwings and cilia whitish.

The shining white appearance of this species is distinctive.

== Distribution ==
This species is endemic to New Zealand. It has been observed in the South Island.

== Habitat and host species ==
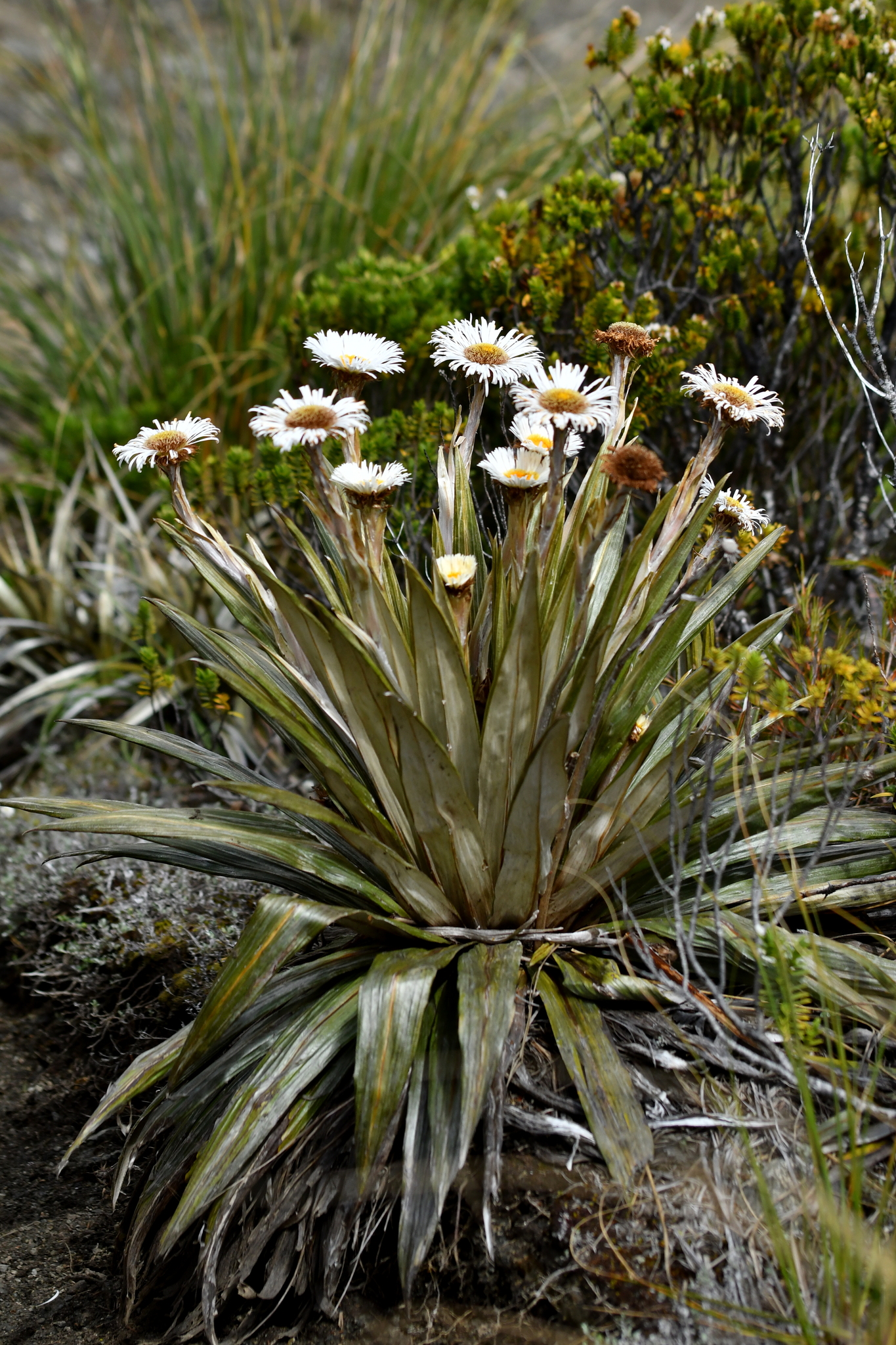
Host species Celmisia coriacea.

This species inhabits montane to subalpine grassland. The larvae feed on Celmisia species, including Celmisia coriacea and Celmisia densiflora. They mine the leaves of their host plant.

== Behaviour ==
Larva have been recorded in February, April and May. Adults have been recorded in January and from October to December. There is probably one generation per year. Adults of this species run and takes short flights with extreme rapidity.
