= Waitohi River =

Location
- Country: New Zealand

Physical characteristics
- Source
  - location: Puketeraki Range
  - coordinates: 42.9776°S 172.29017°E
  - elevation: 1,160 metres (3,810 ft)
- Mouth: Hurunui River
  - location: Near Hurunui and State Highway 7 bridge
  - elevation: 180 metres (590 ft)
- Length: 41 km (25 mi)

Basin features
- Tributaries
  - left: Whistling Creek, Big Bush Stream, Jacks Stream,
  - right: Retreat Creek, Bridge Creek, Taruna Stream, Washpen Stream

The Waitohi River is a river of the north Canterbury region of New Zealand's South Island. It initially flows northeast from its origins in the Puketeraki Range 25 kilometres (16 mi) south of Lake Sumner before turning eastwards to reach the Hurunui River at the settlement of Hurunui.

== See also ==
- List of rivers of New Zealand
