= Tour Aotearoa =

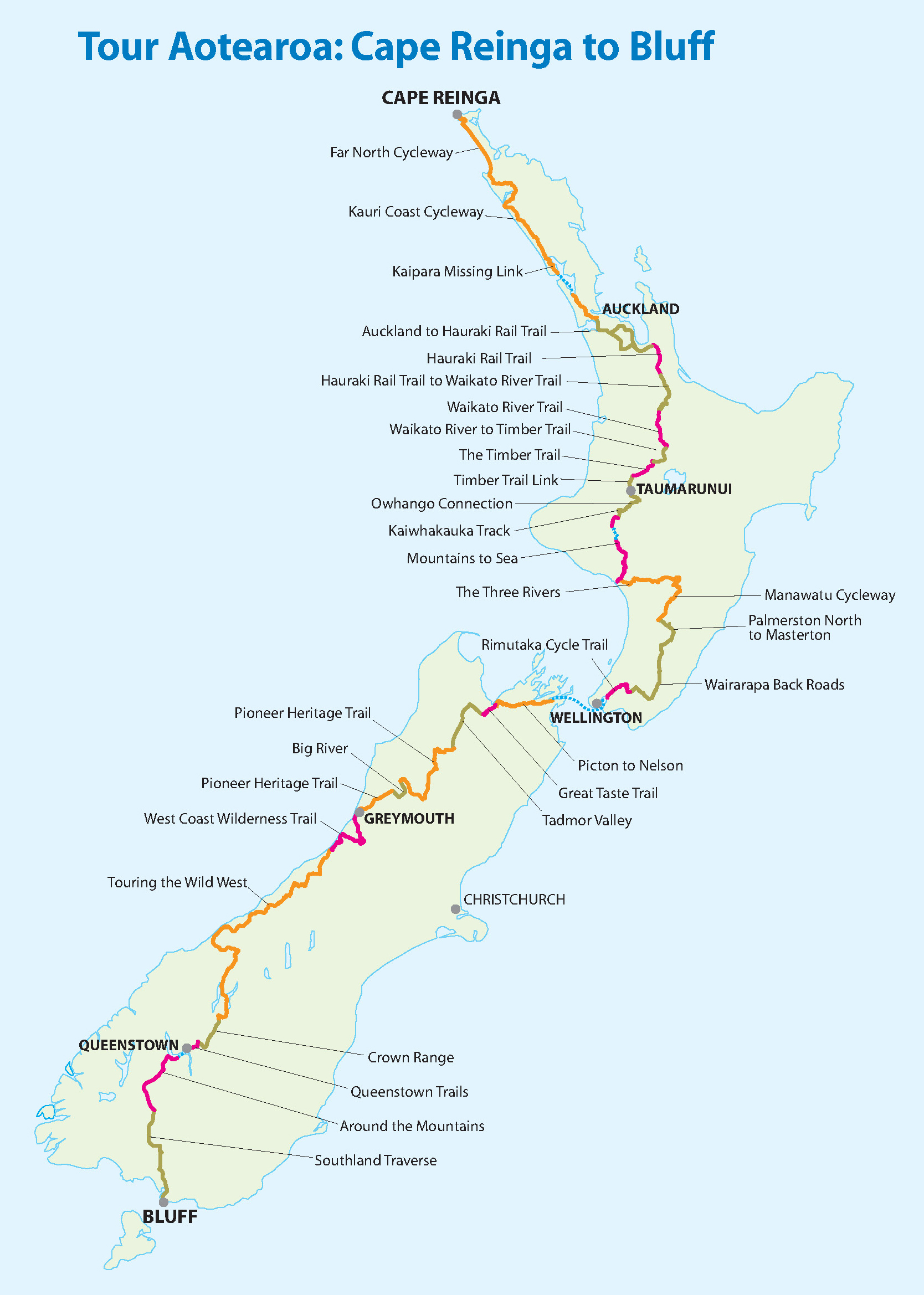
Map of the Tour Aotearoa bikepacking route

Tour Aotearoa is an annual cycle tour event and cycling route in New Zealand. The route travels 3,000 kilometres (1,900 mi) from Cape Reinga to Bluff.

Tour Aotearoa's debut event in 2016 included about 250 riders. The event was organised by Jonathan Kennett, a manager of the New Zealand Cycle Trail project. Kennett said that as the Cycle Trail project manager, he was often asked what was the best route from Cape Reinga to Bluff, which was part of the inspiration for the event. Kennett described the route in 2016 as a "mix of off-road trails, back-country roads, a few bits of highway, and even 90 Mile Beach", and that more sections would move off-road every month as more cycle trails were built.

The event is a brevet, meaning that it is not a race and cyclists ride at their own pace, though participants are expected to complete the challenge in under 30 days and reach 30 photo checkpoints, as well as carry all their own gear. The event was biannual, held in 2016, 2018, and 2020, then moved to yearly with an event in 2021.

The youngest person to fully complete the route alone was William Thorpe at age 15, in December 2025, but not as part of the brevet. He completed the full route in one go in 28 days. Prior to this, The New Zealand Herald reported that Jackson Kelly completed the event at age 16. Kelly and his father entered the event in 2021 and completed the route over 28 days.

== Route ==
Writer Graeme Simpson said in 2018 that although the route was only a few years old, "it's already one of New Zealand's great cycling adventures and is recognised as one of the best in the world, too."

The route is a mix of sealed roads, gravel roads, 4WD tracks, cycle trails and mountain bike tracks. The route segments are selected to include as many Great Rides as possible and avoid high traffic main roads. Route segments are updated as new trail is created.

All cycling on the route is free and open to the public all year round, however the route does require four or five commercial boat rides: Hokianga Harbour, Kaipara Harbour (optional), Wanganui River, Cook Strait, and Lake Wakatipu.

=== Main route segments ===
North Island

- Far North Cycleway Ninety Mile Beach
- Kauri Coast Cycleway
- Kaipara Missing Link
- Hauraki Rail Trail
- Waikato River Trail
- Timber Trail
- Kaiwhakauka Track
- Bridge to Nowhere Mountain Biking Trail
- Mountains to Sea
- The Three Rivers
- Manawatu Cycleway
- Remutaka Cycle Trail

South Island

- Queen Charlotte Drive
- Maungatapu Track
- Tasman's Great Taste Trail
- Pioneer Heritage Trail
- Big River and Waiuta Track
- West Coast Wilderness Trail
- Haast Pass
- Crown Range
- Queenstown Trail
- Around the Mountains Cycle Trail
- Southland Traverse

== See also ==
- Te Araroa – the tramping/walking route from Cape Reinga to Bluff
