= Greenstone River / Hokonui =

Greenstone River / Hokonui Big Hohonu River
- Location of the Greenstone River / Hokonui
- Native name: Hokonui (Māori)

Location
- Country: New Zealand
- Region: West Coast

Physical characteristics
- Source: Hohonu Range
  - coordinates: 42.6989°S 171.3564°E
  - elevation: 1,020 metres (3,350 ft)
- Mouth: Taramakau River
  - coordinates: 42.5784°S 171.1672°E

Basin features
- Tributaries
  - left: Three Mile Creek
  - right: French Creek, Little Hohonu River, Foleys Creek, Fireball Creek

The Greenstone River / Hokonui (Māori: Hokonui), also known as the Big Hohonu River, is a river on the West Coast of New Zealand's South Island. It rises in the Hohonu Range, an outlying range of the Southern Alps / Kā Tiritiri o te Moana, roughly 30 kilometres (19 mi) southeast of Greymouth. The river flows northwest for its entire length, eventually joining the same river valley as the larger Taramakau River near the town of Kumara. From here, the two rivers flow roughly parallel for around 5 kilometres (3.1 mi) before the Greenstone / Hokonui joins the Taramakau just shy of the latter's mouth in the Tasman Sea. The area surrounding the river was historically home to gold mining operations, following the discovery of payable amounts of gold in 1864. The township of Greenstone was established on the river in the wake of this discovery, with other industries including a sawmill soon being established.

In 1998, the Greenstone River / Hokonui became one of nearly 90 places to be given a dual name by the passage of the Ngāi Tahu Claims Settlement Act 1998, a landmark Treaty of Waitangi settlement with Ngāi Tahu. The river has also historically been known as the Big Hohonu River, to distinguish it from the nearby Little and Eastern Hohonu Rivers.

== See also ==
- List of rivers of New Zealand
