= Big Wainihinihi River =

River in New Zealand

- Route of the Big Wainihinihi River
- Mouth of the Big Wainihinihi River Big Wainihinihi River (South Island)

Location
- Country: New Zealand
- region: West Coast Region
- District: Westland District

Physical characteristics
- Source: Razorback Ridge
  - location: Tara Tama Range
  - coordinates: 42°48′57″S 171°22′25″E
  - elevation: 1,500 m (4,900 ft)
- Mouth: Taramakau River
  - location: Wainihinihi
  - coordinates: 42°45′20″S 171°20′16″E
  - elevation: 90 m (300 ft)
- Length: 13.1 kilometres (8.1 mi)

Basin features
- Progression: Big Wainihinihi River → Taramakau River → Tasman Sea
- River system: Taramakau River

The Big Wainihinihi River is a river in the Westland district of New Zealand. It is a tributary of the Taramakau River.

== See also ==
- List of rivers of New Zealand
