= Hurunui River =

River in Canterbury, New Zealand

Coordinates: 42°54′S 173°16′E

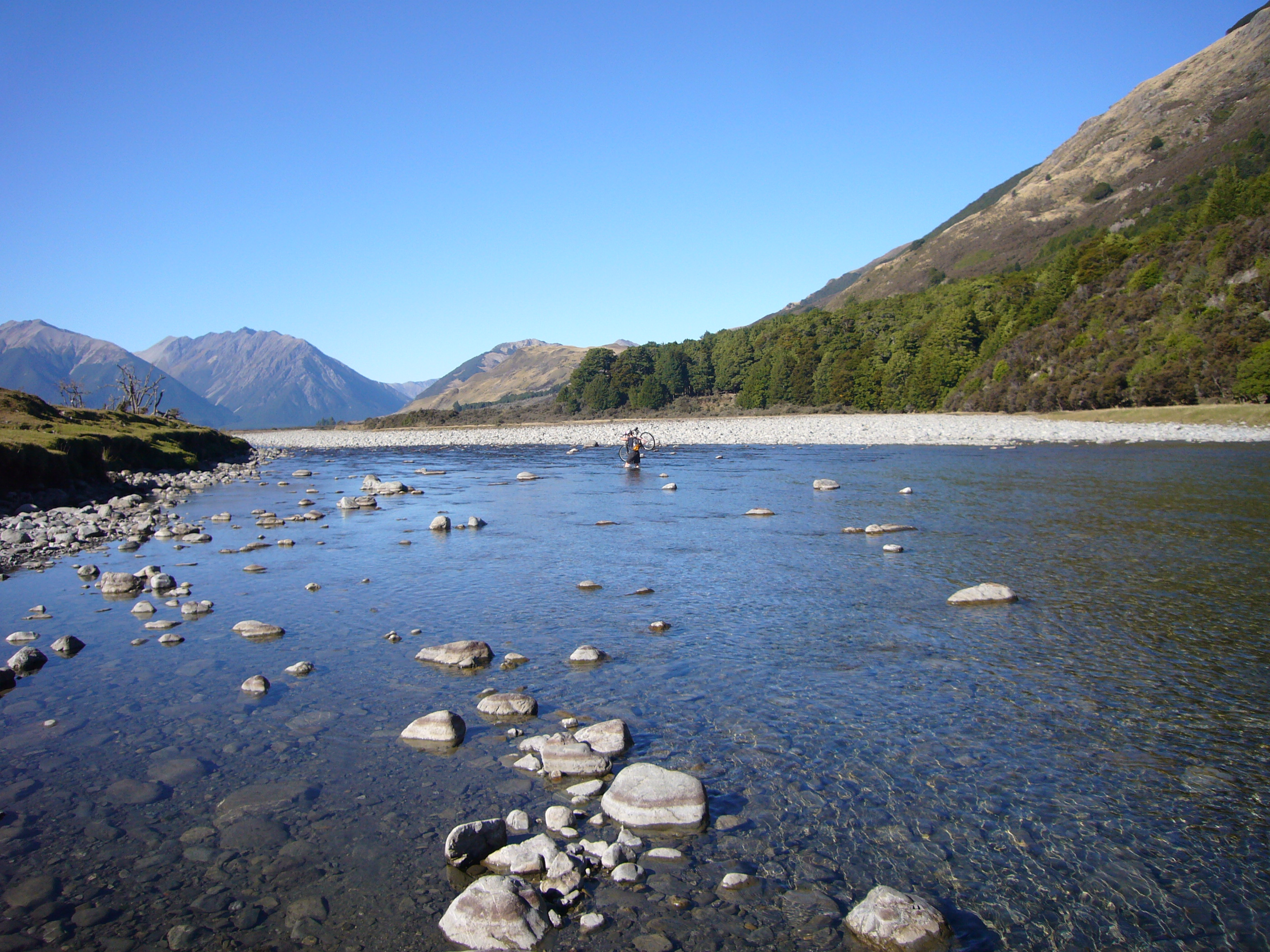
- A mountainbiker crossing the Hurunui River upstream of Lake Sumner

- Location of the mouth within New Zealand

Location
- Country: New Zealand

Physical characteristics
- Source
  - location: Southern Alps
- Mouth
  - location: Pacific Ocean
  - elevation: sea level
- Length: 150 km (93 mi)
- Basin size: 2,671 km^{2} (1,031 mi^{2})
- Discharge
  - average: 53 m^{3}/s (1,900 cu ft/s)
  - minimum: 16.8 m^{3}/s (590 cu ft/s)

The Hurunui River is the fourth largest of the four principal rivers in north Canterbury, New Zealand, with a catchment area of 2,670 square kilometres (1,030 mi^{2}). The river flows from the eastern side of the Southern Alps, to the Pacific Ocean.

== Geography ==
The head of the Hurunui River is at Harper Pass; on the other side of the pass is the Taramakau River. Some of the tributaries include the Jollie Brook, the Hurunui River South Branch, the Glenrae River and the Mandamus River. The Hurunui River flows through Lake Sumner. A hot pool has been constructed at the base of a small waterfall on a side stream of the river.

== Recreation ==
The river has rapids rated class II and III on the international scale of river difficulty and is popular for kayaking. The best whitewater is considered to be below the confluence of the north and south branches of the river in Maori Gully and in the Harwarden Gorge.

Chinook salmon (Oncorhynchus tshawytscha) were introduced from California in the 1900s for game fishing.

== Water conservation order ==
On 30 August 2007, the New Zealand Fish and Game Council and the New Zealand Recreational Canoeing Association (now known as Whitewater NZ) lodged an application with the Ministry for the Environment for a Water Conservation Order to protect the Hurunui River.

On 14 August 2009, the Special Tribunal considering the application recommended to the Minister that a conservation order be granted for the North Branch of the Hurunui River but not the South Branch. On 2 September, Whitewater NZ lodged an appeal of the Tribunal's decision with the Environment Court in order to include the South Branch of the Hurunui River.

== Water project ==
The Hurunui Water Project has applied to Environment Canterbury, the regional council responsible for administering the river, for resource consents to dam the river and to take water for irrigation. The proposed scheme involves a weir that will raise the level of Lake Sumner, a dam and lake on the south branch of the river and an intake on the main stem of the river.

In October 2009, the Hurunui Water Project said it would delay the processing of its applications for resource consents for up to a year so that the Canterbury Water Management Strategy could address the issue of water storage. A march planned in Christchurch as a protest to the scheme still went ahead as scheduled two days after the announcement. As well as hundreds of protest marchers, kayakers and fishers travelled down the Avon River. Sam Mahon, a Canterbury-based artist concerned about water pollution, made a bust of Environment Minister Nick Smith out of dairy-cow dung in order to publicise the campaign to stop the Hurunui River from being dammed for irrigation.

In February 2010 the Hurunui Water Project announced that it would reactivate the resource consent process. On 16 November 2010, the Hurunui Water Project lodged a High Court appeal of Environment Canterbury's decision to make the damming of the Hurunui River a non-complying activity in the Canterbury Natural Resources Regional Plan.

In September 2012 the public notification of resource consent recommenced. The scope includes the construction of four dams on the Waitohi river, extraction of up to 49.2 cubic metres per second (1,740 cu ft/s) of water from the main stem of the Hurunui river, extraction of up to 42.4 cubic metres per second (1,500 cu ft/s) from the Waitohi River, run-of-river hydro-power generation, and storage of 6.5 million cubic metres (5,300 acre⋅ft) of water in other dams on the plains. By comparison the existing flow of the Hurunui river is 53 cubic metres per second (1,900 cu ft/s) (mean) and low-flow of 16.8 cubic metres per second (590 cu ft/s).

== See also ==
- Rivers of New Zealand
