= Mandamus River =

Coordinates: 42.7635°S 172.5498°E

Location
- Country: New Zealand

Physical characteristics
- Source
  - location: Organ Range
- Mouth
  - location: Hurunui River

Mandamus River is a river in the South Island of New Zealand.

The headwaters are on the southern side of the Organ Range and it feeds into the Hurunui River 25 kilometres (16 mi) due west of Culverden.
