= Glenrae River =

Coordinates: 42°49′S 172°30′E

Location
- Country: New Zealand

Physical characteristics
- Source
  - location: Glynn Wye Range
- Mouth
  - location: Hurunui River

The Glenrae River is a river in the Canterbury region of New Zealand. It arises in the Glynn Wye Range near Mount Skiddaw and flows through the Lake Sumner Forest Park south and then south-east into the Hurunui River, which exits in the Pacific Ocean. Its tributaries include Devils Creek and Robyne Creek.

== See also ==
- List of rivers of New Zealand
