= Te Araroa =

Hiking trail in New Zealand

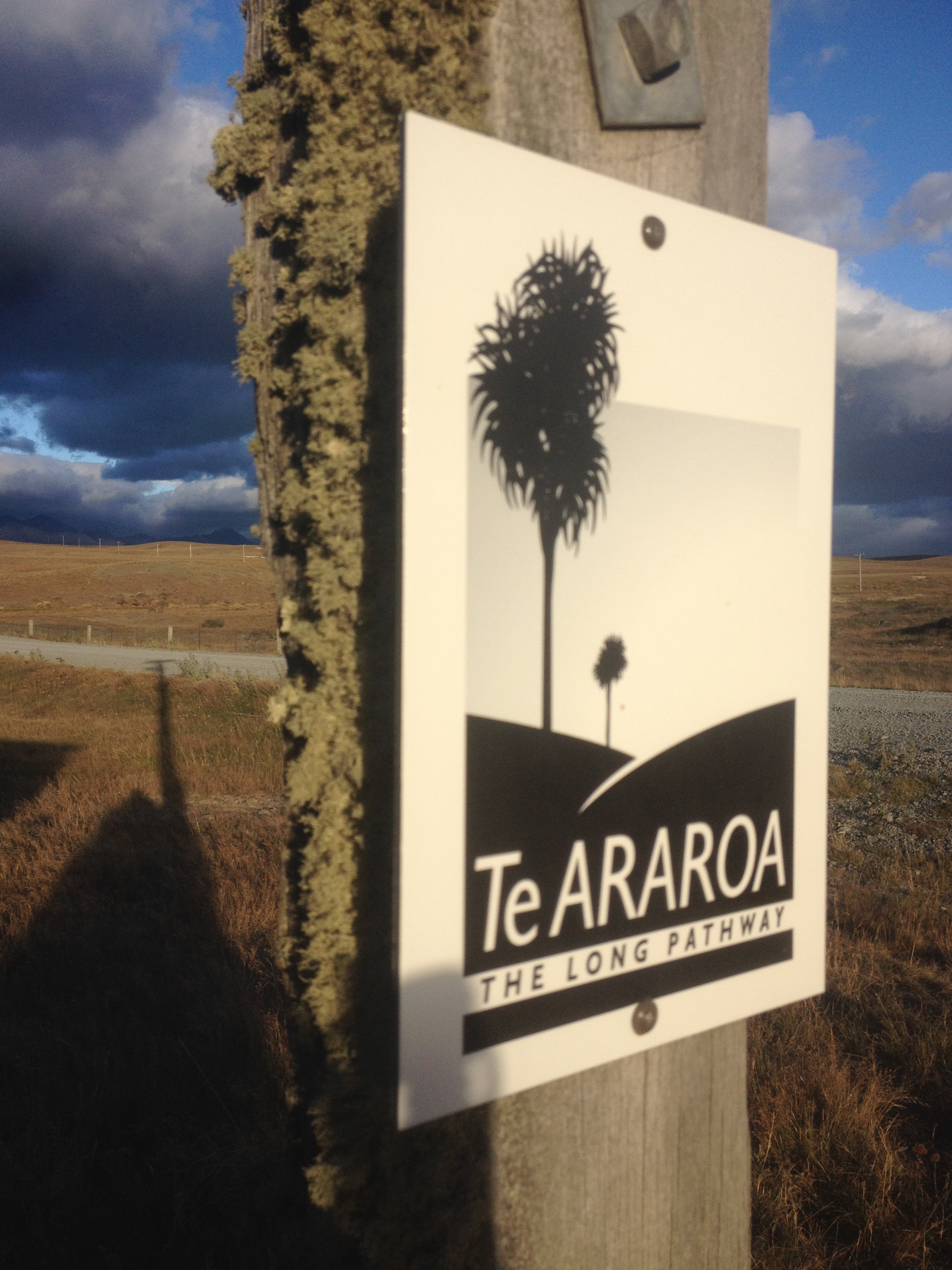
- Te Araroa sign in front of Telegraph Hut
- Length: 3,000 km (1,864 mi)
- Location: New Zealand
- Trailheads: Cape Reinga; Bluff
- Use: Hiking

Te Araroa (The Long Pathway) is New Zealand's long distance tramping route, stretching circa 3,000 kilometres (1,900 mi) along the length of the country's two main islands from Cape Reinga to Bluff. Officially opened in 2011, it is made up of a mixture of previously made tracks and walkways, new tracks, and link sections alongside roads. Tramping the full length of the trail generally takes three to six months.

== History ==
The idea of a national walkway goes back to the 1970s, when it was first advocated for by the Federated Mountain Clubs of New Zealand. In 1975 the New Zealand Walkways Commission was established, but in 15 years made little progress. In 1994, journalist Geoff Chapple advocated for a New Zealand-long walking track, and founded Te Araroa Trust. Advocacy and negotiations for access continued, and by 2006 plans for the trail began being part of local government plans. The Government allocated $3.8 million for development of new sections of the trail on conservation land in 2007. The 3,000 kilometres (1,900 mi) route officially opened on 3 December 2011 after 10 years of work by hundreds of volunteers.

Since opening, new tracks have been created to alter the route, particularly to avoid road walking. These include the 10 km Escarpment Track, which opened in 2016, and a sealed track from Invercargill to Bluff is under construction. In its 2019 Strategic Plan, Te Araroa Trust said it intended to reduce the amount of road walking to 10% of the trail by 2022 and set a long-term goal to reduce it to under 5%. Parts have also been closed with detours set up, such as a section in the Bay of Islands which was closed due to erosion in 2019.

== The trail ==
Te Araroa stretches roughly 3,000 km (1,864 mi), varying in distance when sections are upgraded or otherwise changed. This is almost twice the straight-line distance from Cape Reinga to Bluff 1,475 km (917 mi). Tracks that cross privately owned land may be closed during lambing season, while others have been closed to people to protect kauri trees from kauri dieback.

The trail is a mix of tracks, including wilderness tracks, paths through paddocks, beaches, roads, and highways, as well as a section which is a river and must be kayaked. Many parts of the trail are challenging. In these sections, trip planning, river crossing and navigation skills are recommended, as well as a good level of fitness and heavy boots. Most through-hikers take between three and six months for a complete trip and 90% of those travel from north to south.

The trail has approximately 300 sections ranging from walks of one to two hours through to an approximately nine-day route in the South Island where most trampers haul large amounts of food and gear. About 60% of the trail crosses conservation land managed by the Department of Conservation. The remainder is mostly on privately owned land. There have been reports that some landowners have grown frustrated with the number of walkers, while many see it as a chance "be good neighbours and to bridge that rural-urban divide".

With the exception of a short section of the Queen Charlotte Track at the trail's northern terminus in the South Island, neither permit nor fee is required to walk Te Araroa. However, Te Araroa Trust requests a donation of $750 per person tramping the full trail, $400 for those walking one island only, and smaller amounts for section hikers. Through-hikers will also pay $118 for a six-month Department of Conservation Backcountry Hut Pass if they wish to sleep in New Zealand's extensive network of back-country huts.

== Usage ==
Hundreds of thousands of people walk some part of Te Araroa each year, and in the 2018/19 summer the Te Araroa Trust counted 1200 through-walkers. This was up from 550 people attempting a through-hike in 2016–17, and 350 the year before. Sections of the track can see more traffic; for example, one section is seeing 70,000 to 80,000 people each year. In that example, the section is on private land.

Walkers often receive support from "Trail Angels" – volunteers living near the track who can provide places to sleep, showers, and food.

=== Unofficial record completions ===
Map

The unofficial claimed record time for completing Te Araroa supported is 31 days, 19 hours, and 41 minutes, by ultrarunner Karel Sabbe from Belgium in 2025. Karel broke the previous claimed record by 18 days. The claimed self-supported record time by a woman was set by Paulina Zäck from Germany in 2025, at fifty-four days and ten hours. The claimed youngest person to walk the trail was Jonathan Rapsey, who finished it at the age of seven with his sister Elizabeth aged nine and their parents.

== Gallery ==
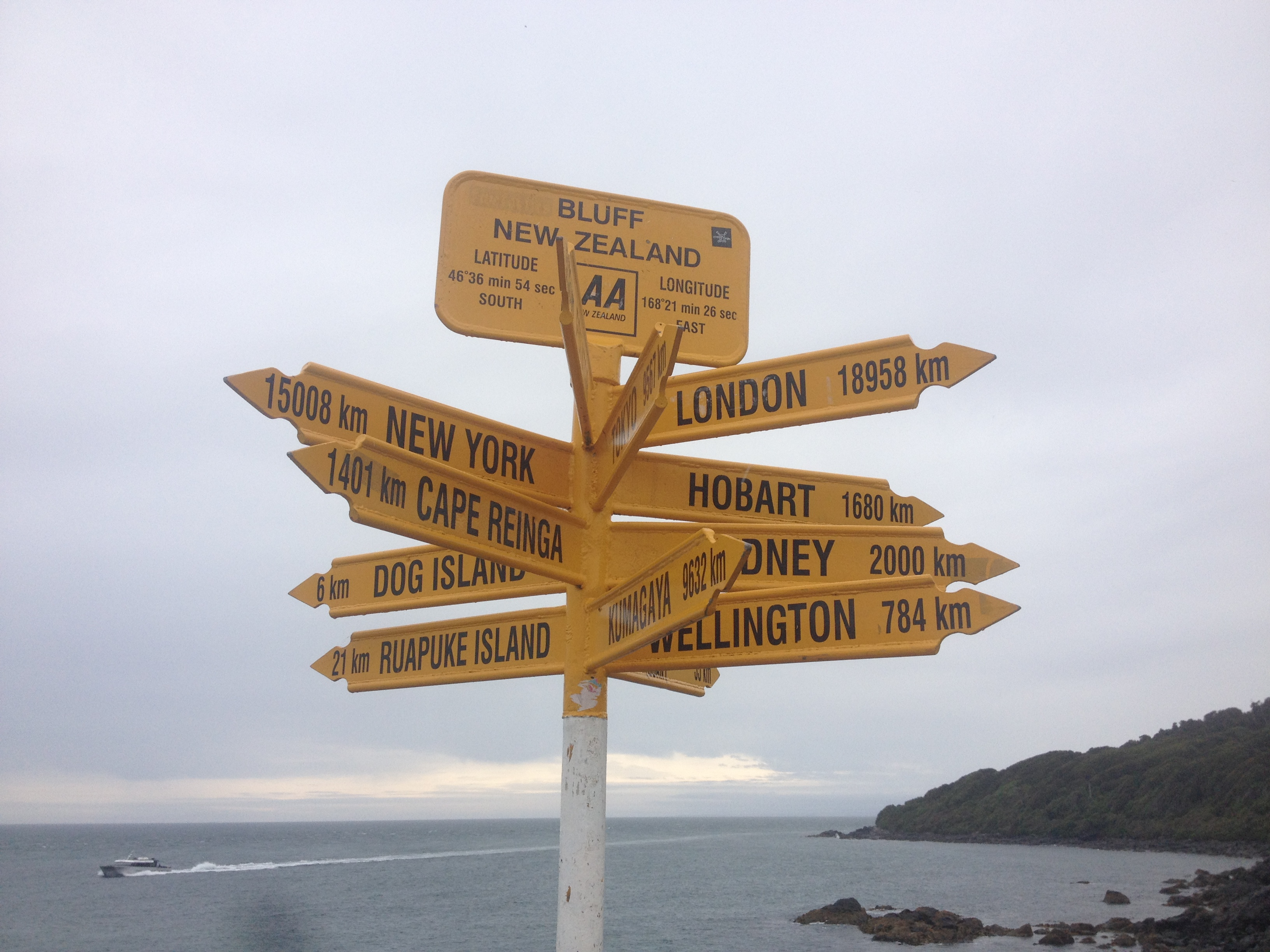
Stirling Point, Te Araroa's southern terminus in Bluff

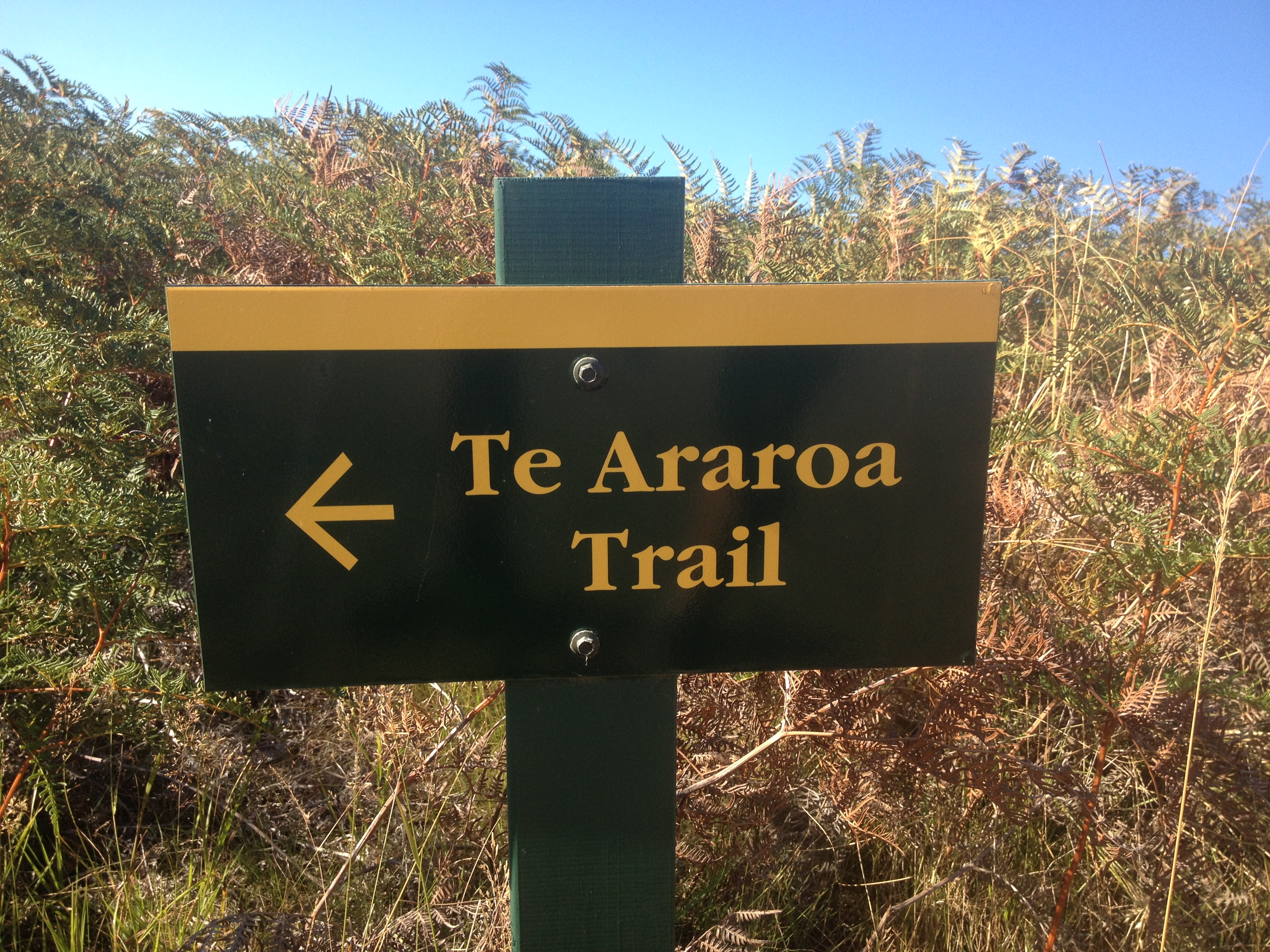
Te Araroa Trail sign

== See also ==
- Harper Pass
- Tour Aotearoa a cycling route from Cape Reinga to Bluff
