= Otehake River =

River in New Zealand

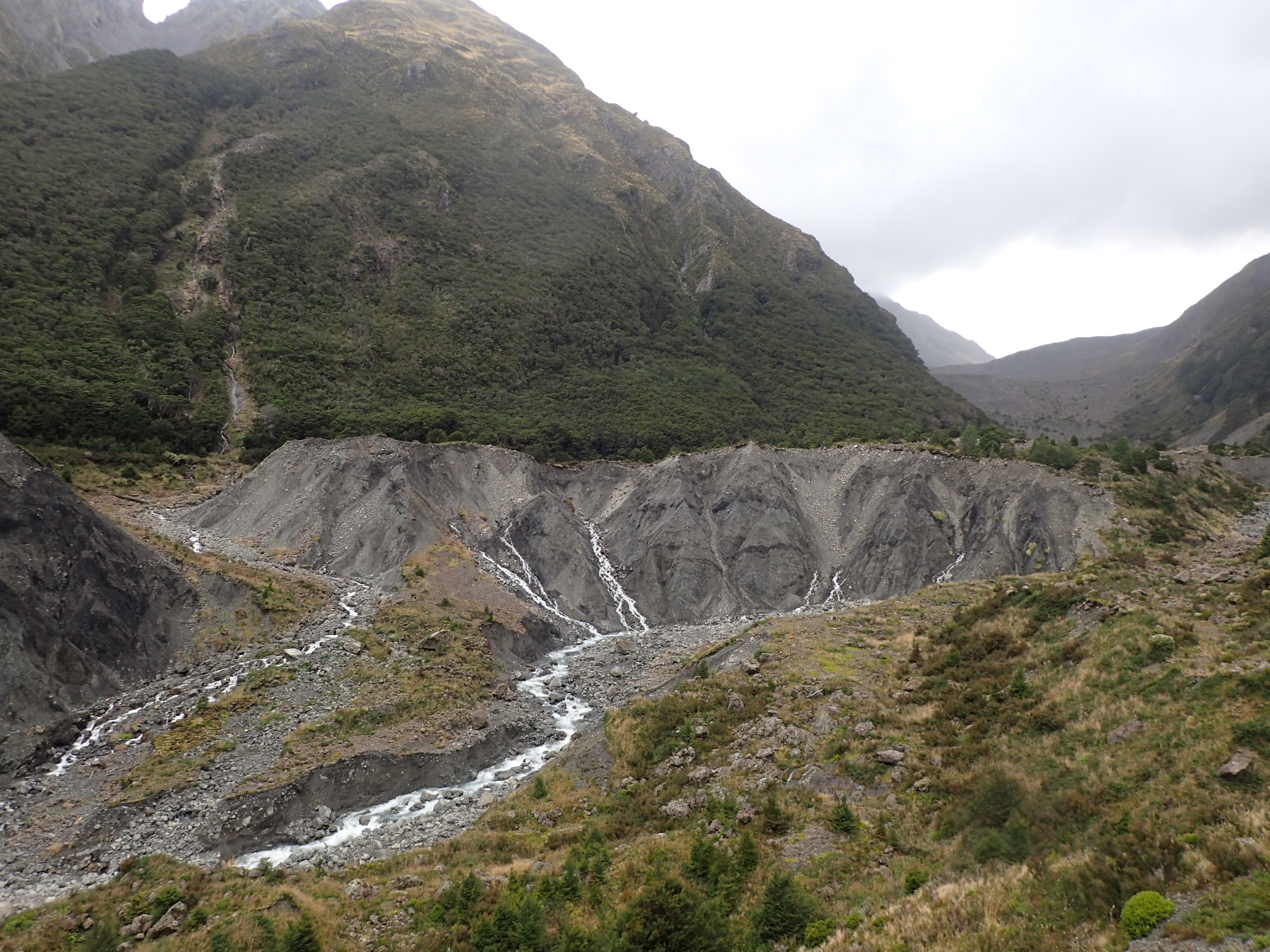
- Taruahuna Pass. Headwaters of the Otehake River (West Branch) New Zealand
- Route of the Otehake River
- Mouth of the Otehake River Otehake River (South Island)

Location
- Country: New Zealand

Physical characteristics
- Source: Southern Alps (West Branch)
  - coordinates: 42.8814°S 171.6800°E
- 2nd source: Southern Alps (East Branch)
  - coordinates: 42.9061°S 171.6901°E
- Mouth
  - location: Taramakau River
  - coordinates: 42°45′46″S 171°43′23″E

Basin features
- Progression: Otehake River → Taramakau River → Tasman Sea
- Tributaries
  - left: Whaiti Stream
  - right: Koropuku Creek

Otehake River is located on the West Coast of the South Island of New Zealand. It flows northward through the Arthur's Pass National Park and into the Taramakau River.
