= Mount Rolleston =

Mountain in New Zealand

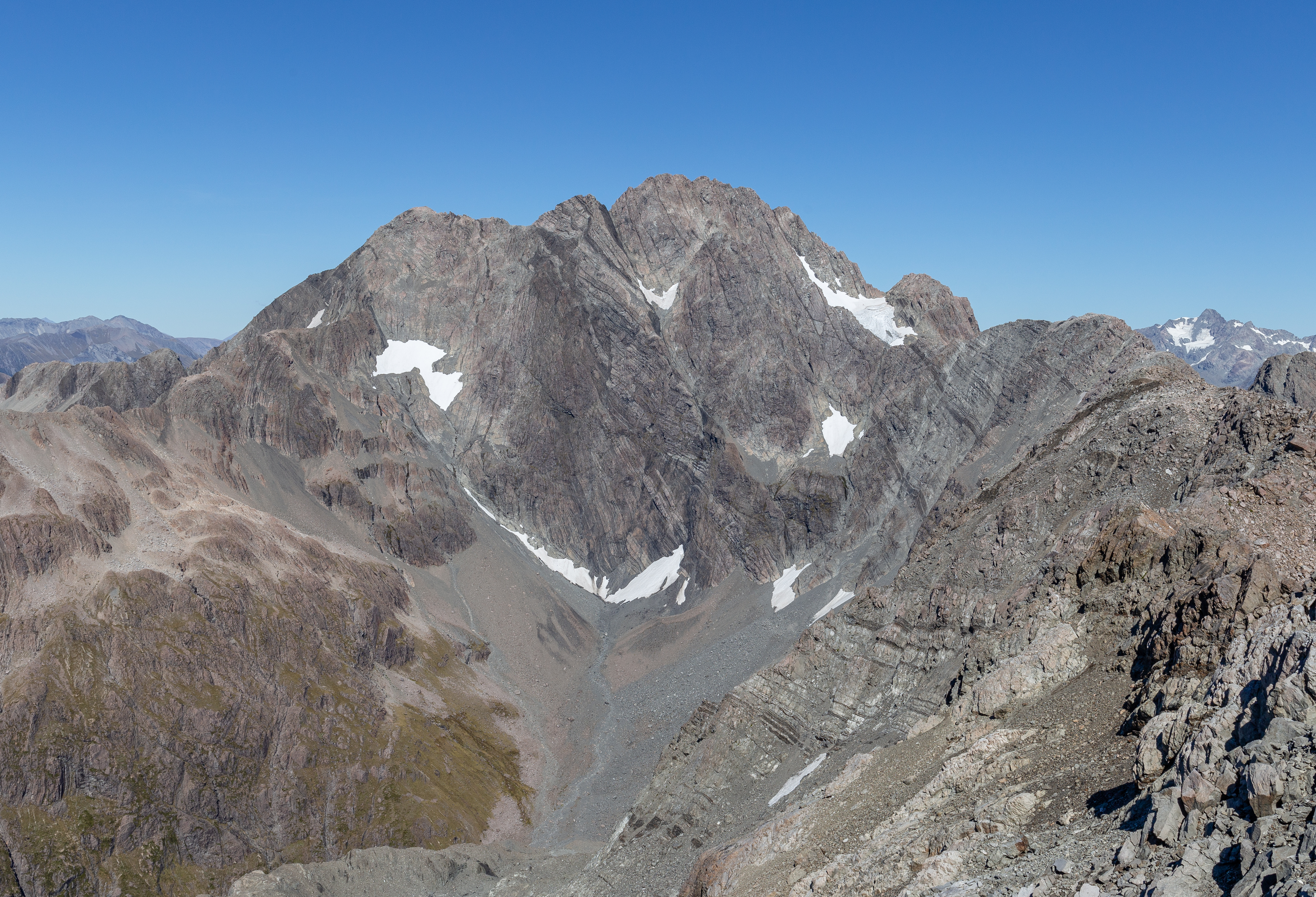

Highest point
- Elevation: 2,271 m (7,451 ft)
- Coordinates: 42°54′51.55″S 171°31′2.78″E

Geography
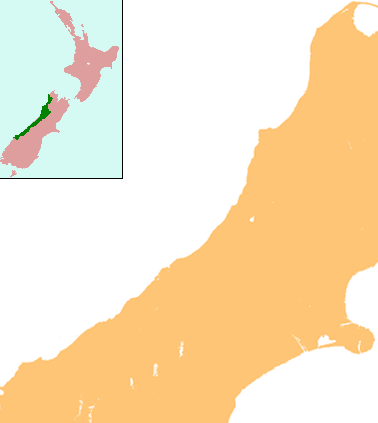
- Location within West Coast
- Location: South Island, New Zealand
- Parent range: Southern Alps

Climbing
- First ascent: 1912 by H. Thompson, J. Gilligan

Mount Rolleston (2,271 m) is a prominent peak in Arthur's Pass National Park in the South Island of New Zealand. It was named by the surveyor Arthur Dudley Dobson in 1864, who observed the peak while searching for a route through the Southern Alps to the West Coast gold fields. The name honours the then Superintendent of the Canterbury Province, William Rolleston.

While not the highest mountain in the National Park (Mount Murchison holds that honour), it is well known because it can be viewed from State Highway 73 that runs through Arthur's Pass to the West Coast of the South Island. It is also popular with climbers, as it can be climbed in a day starting from Arthur's Pass township. Mount Rolleston was first climbed in 1912 by climbers H. Thomson and J. Gilligan. Mount Rolleston can be climbed via several routes, including the Rome or Goldney Ridges, the latter of which allows access to Otira Slide, which in winter can be descended by skis.

The upper slopes of Mount Rolleston are the headwaters of several rivers, most notably the Waimakariri and several tributaries of the Otira.
