= Ōtira River =

River in the South Island of New Zealand

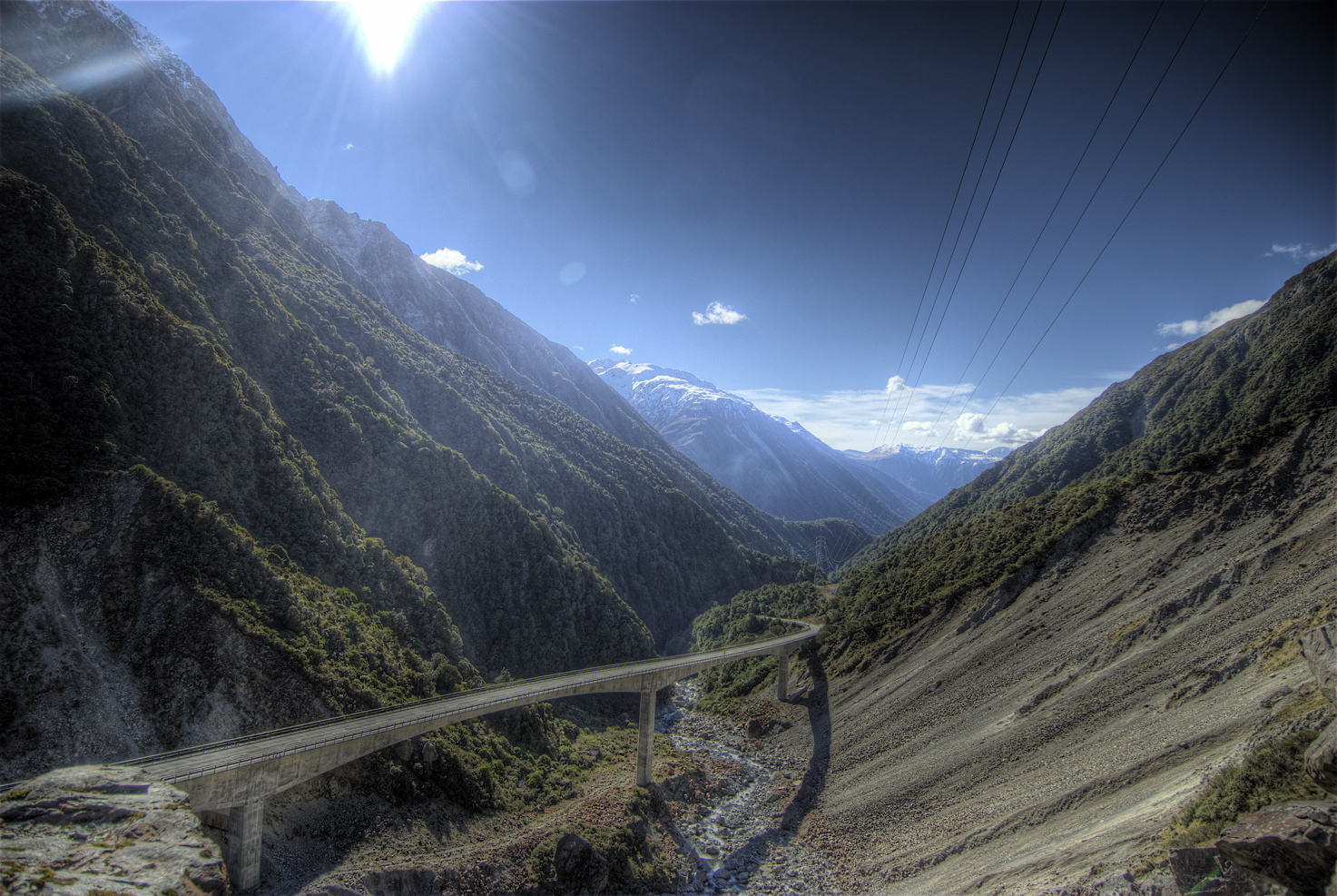
- Upper Ōtira River and Otira Viaduct
- Route of the Ōtira River
- Mouth of the Ōtira River Ōtira River (South Island)

Location
- Country: New Zealand

Physical characteristics
- Source: Mount Rolleston
  - coordinates: 42.9022°S 171.5231°E
- Mouth
  - location: Taramakau River
  - coordinates: 42°45′43″S 171°37′59″E
- Length: 20 km (12 mi)

Basin features
- Progression: Ōtira River → Taramakau River → Tasman Sea
- Tributaries
  - left: Curtis Creek, Kea Creek, Park Creek, Hodge Creek, Rolleston River, Goat Creek, Kellys Creek
  - right: Pegleg Creek, Candys Creek, Reid Falls, Wesley Creek, Barrack Creek, Deception River, Paratu Stream
- Bridges: Ōtira Viaduct, Wallace Point Bridge, Yorkeys Point Bridge, Ōtira River Bridge, Morrison Footbridge

The Ōtira River is located in the central South Island of New Zealand. It rises on the slopes of Mount Rolleston in the Southern Alps, and flows north for 20 kilometres (12 mi), passing through the town of Otira before joining the Taramakau River. The Taramakau's outflow is into the Tasman Sea, 12 kilometres (7.5 mi) south of Greymouth.

The valley of the Ōtira River forms the northwestern approach to Arthur's Pass, one of the three main passes across the Southern Alps.
