= Taramakau River =

River in New Zealand

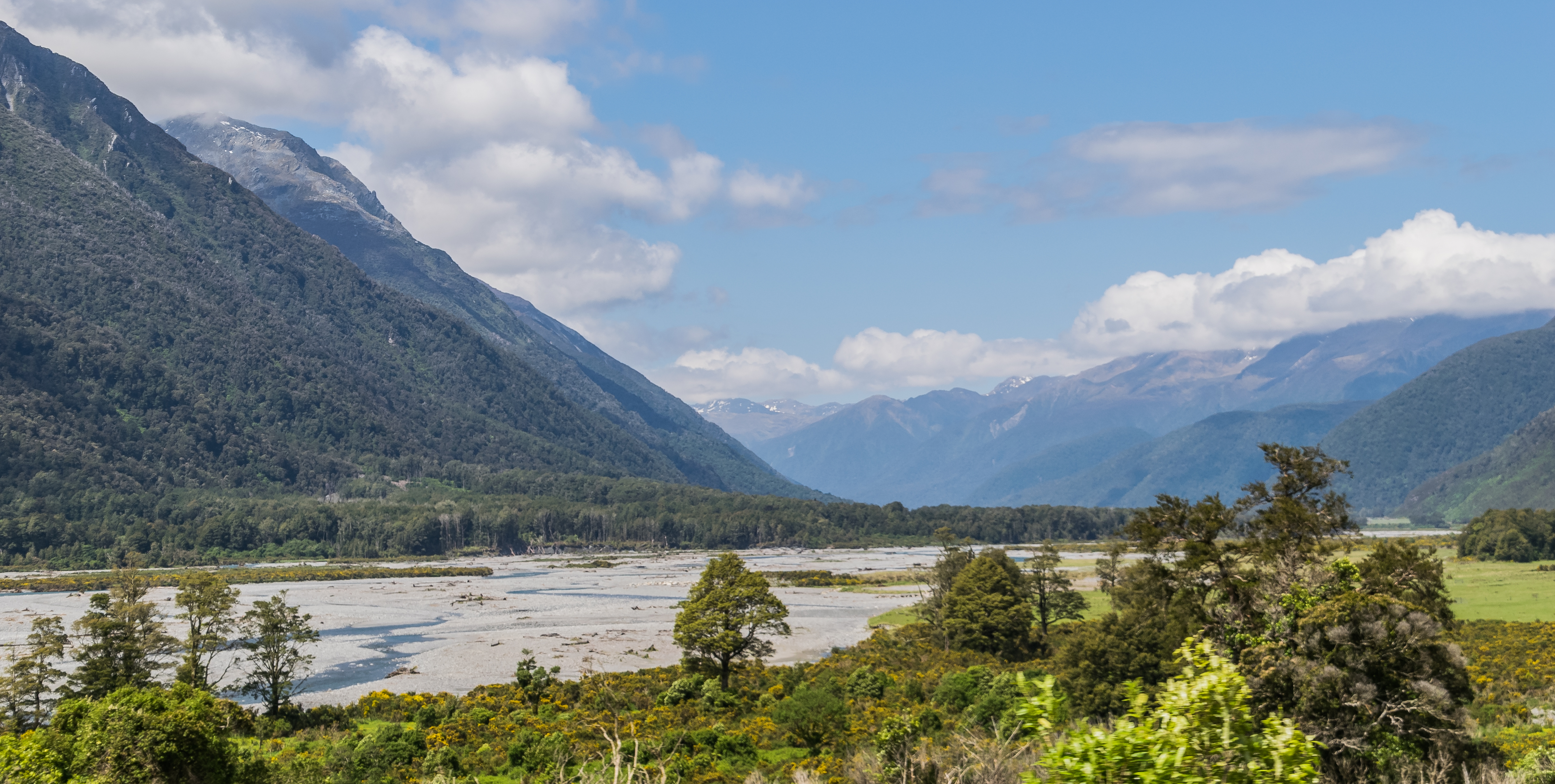
- View westwards from near Jacksons
- Route of the Taramakau River
- Mouth of the Taramakau River Taramakau River (South Island)
- Etymology: From Kāi Tahu Māori: tere – to flow, and makau – curve or bend
- Native name: Teremakau (Māori)

Location
- Country: New Zealand
- Region: West Coast Region
- District: Westland District

Physical characteristics
- Source: Harper Pass
  - location: Southern Alps / Kā Tiritiri o te Moana
  - coordinates: 42.735303°S 171.882091°E
  - elevation: 1,220 m (4,000 ft)
- Mouth: Kumara Junction
  - location: Tasman Sea
  - coordinates: 42.565614°S 171.125064°E
  - elevation: 0 m (0 ft)
- Length: 75 kilometres (47 mi)

Basin features
- Tributaries
  - left: Otehake River, Ōtira River, Taipo River, Big Wainihinihi River
  - right: Michael Creek, Taverners Creek, Rubieslaw Creek, Greenstone River / Hokonui

The Taramakau River is a river of the West Coast Region of the South Island of New Zealand. It rises in the Southern Alps / Kā Tiritiri o te Moana near Harper Pass, 80 kilometres (50 mi) due east of Hokitika, and runs westward for 75 kilometres (47 mi) into the Tasman Sea 15 kilometres (9.3 mi) south of Greymouth.

The Taramakau River forms the administrative boundary between the Westland District to the south and the Grey District to the north.

Several small rivers are tributaries of the Taramakau. The largest of upper tributaries are the Otehake River and the Ōtira River. The valley of the Ōtira forms the western approach to Arthur's Pass. The Taipo River is a major tributary joining the Taramakau from the south, downstream of Inchbonnie.

== Statutory acknowledgement ==
The South Island iwi Ngāi Tahu have manawhenua or tribal authority over the Taramakau River, acknowledged under s56 of the Ngāi Tahu Claims Settlement Act 1998. The Taramakau was a traditional route of travel across the Southern Alps, providing access to Nōti Taramakau (Harper Pass), one of the lowest and most accessible passes through the mountainous terrain. The river has also been a source of the highly prized stone pounamu.

== Taramakau Bridge at Kumara Junction ==
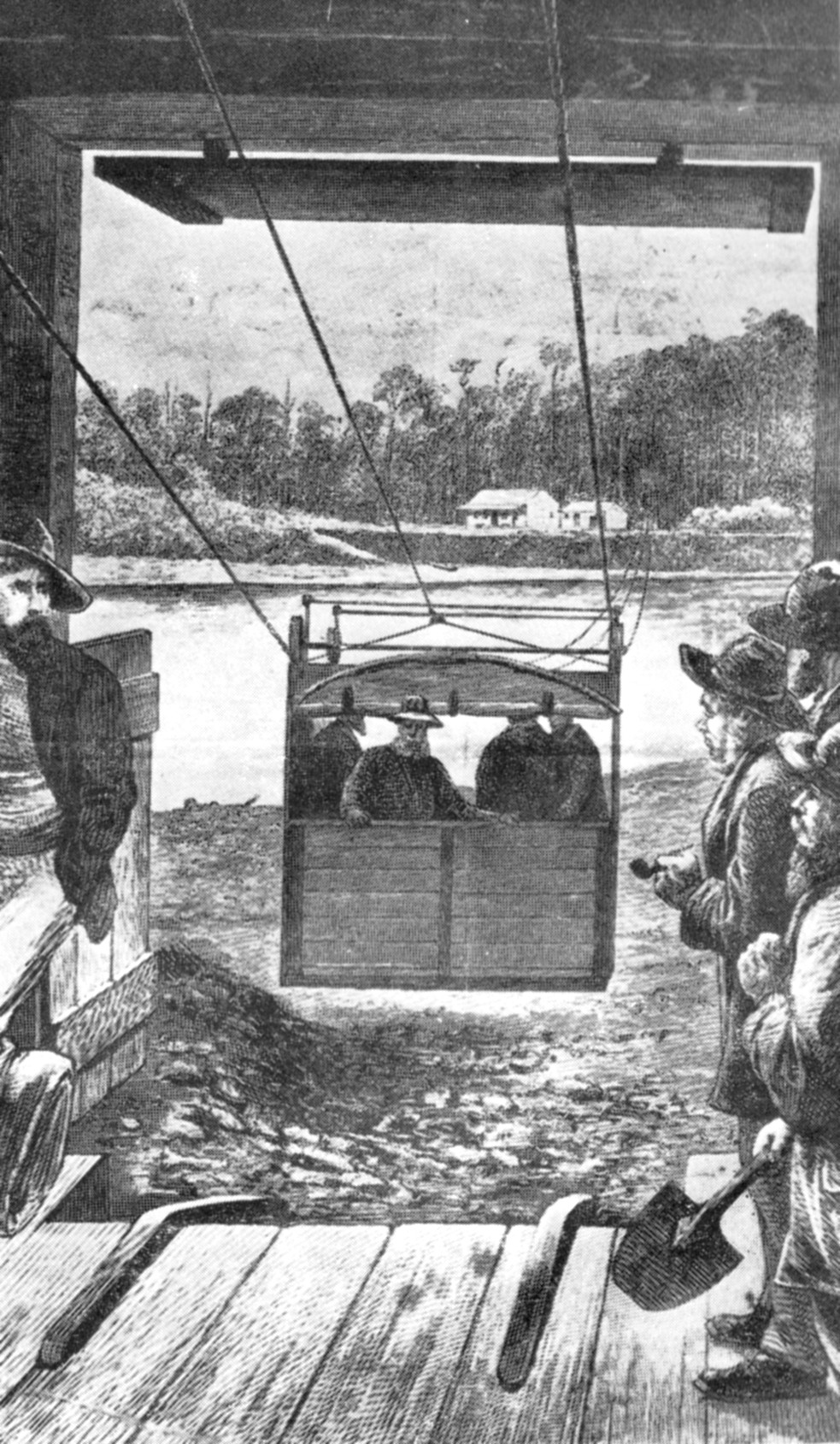
The cable tram used for crossing the Taramakau River before a bridge was built

The Taramakau River posed significant difficulties and dangers for early travellers on the West Coast. The explorer Henry Whitcombe drowned crossing the river on 6 May 1863. There are two memorials to Whitcombe; one on the river's left bank at the (road-)rail bridge, and he is one of the four men commemorated by the Westland Explorers' Monument in Hokitika Cemetery. Before a bridge was built near the coast, a cable way operated across the river, carrying a tram car.

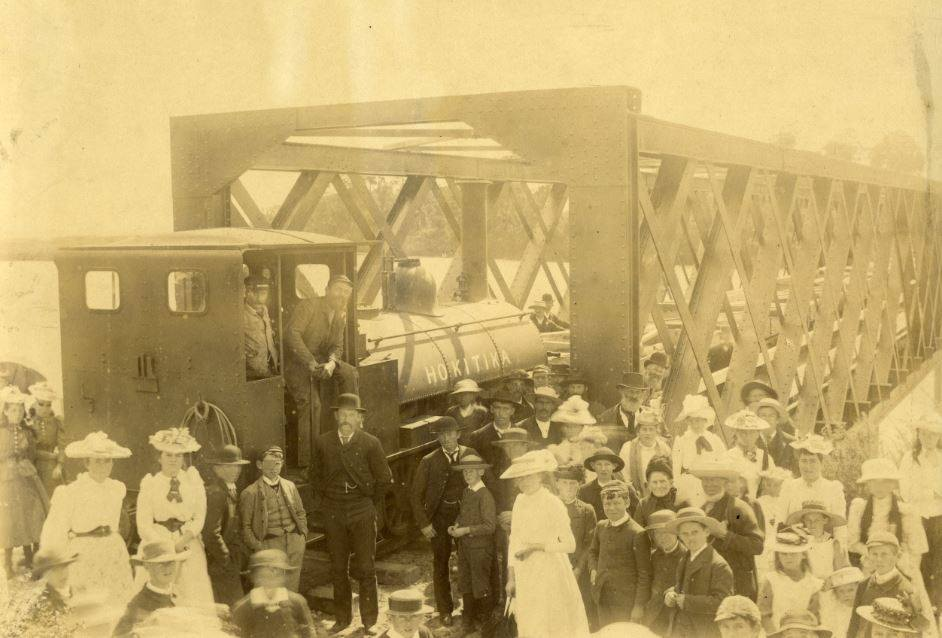
Taramakau road-rail bridge opening (1893)

On 18 December 1893, the railway line from Hokitika to Greymouth opened, including a 220 metres (720 ft) long single-lane road and rail bridge across the Taramakau River near Kumara Junction. By 2016, this bridge was New Zealand's last remaining road and rail bridge. There were 25 crashes on the bridge in the 10 years to June 2015, including one fatality in 2012. The one-lane bridge also caused traffic congestion on State Highway 6, because vehicles had to queue before crossing. Work on a new road bridge commenced in 2016 and was completed at a cost of $25 million. The new bridge was opened on 22 July 2018. The old bridge continued in service as a rail-only bridge.

== Stopbanks at Inchbonnie ==
The Taramakau River crosses the Alpine Fault at Inchbonnie. At this point, it has in its history flowed in three different directions: westwards along its present course, northwards towards and into Lake Brunner via the Ōrangipuku River, and northeast through Lake Poerua, the Poerua River and the lower reaches of Crooked River into Lake Brunner. Inchbonnie is located on an alluvial fan that infills the three valleys. If the Taramakau River changed course at Inchbonnie, in addition to the damage to arable farming land, it would cause increased flows in the Arnold and Grey Rivers. The effective design capacity of existing flood protection works at Greymouth would be reduced, increasing the flood risk exposure of the town.

In the early 1900s, the Taramakau River overflowed into the Ōrangipuku River on several occasions, raising the risk of “breaking-through” to Lake Brunner. Investigations of river protection works began as early as 1907. In February 1946, floodwaters from the Taramakau again flowed into the Ōrangipuku River causing significant problems, and in October that year a proposal was developed to construct a stopbank along the north bank of the Taramakau River. In 1953 a small project involving 60 metres of tree protection and 80 metres of rockwork and was approved. However, by 1958, erosion had progressed to the point that there was only 5 metres of land remaining between the Taramakau and Ōrangipuku Rivers, and emergency works were required. A report prepared in March 1959 recommended construction of 2.5 kilometres (1.6 mi) of new stopbanks, strengthening and raising 1.2 kilometres (0.75 mi) of existing stopbanks, plus 2.5 kilometres (1.6 mi) of new rock rip rap, and diverting the upper section of the Ōrangipuku River into the Taramakau River. This proposal was only partially implemented to contain costs for ratepayers, with works including 900 metres (3,000 ft) of rock riprap, and strengthening and raising stopbanks where there was inadequate freeboard. In August 1959, a 3:1 subsidy was provided by the NZ Soil Conservation and River Control Council for a larger project involving placement of 17,300 tonnes of rock, 9,000 cubic metres of fill for stopbanks and 3,200 tonnes of rock for “topping-up”.

The river protection works at Inchbonnie are some of the most critical flood defences managed by the West Coast Regional Council, because of the widespread consequences if they failed.

Impressions of Taramakau River

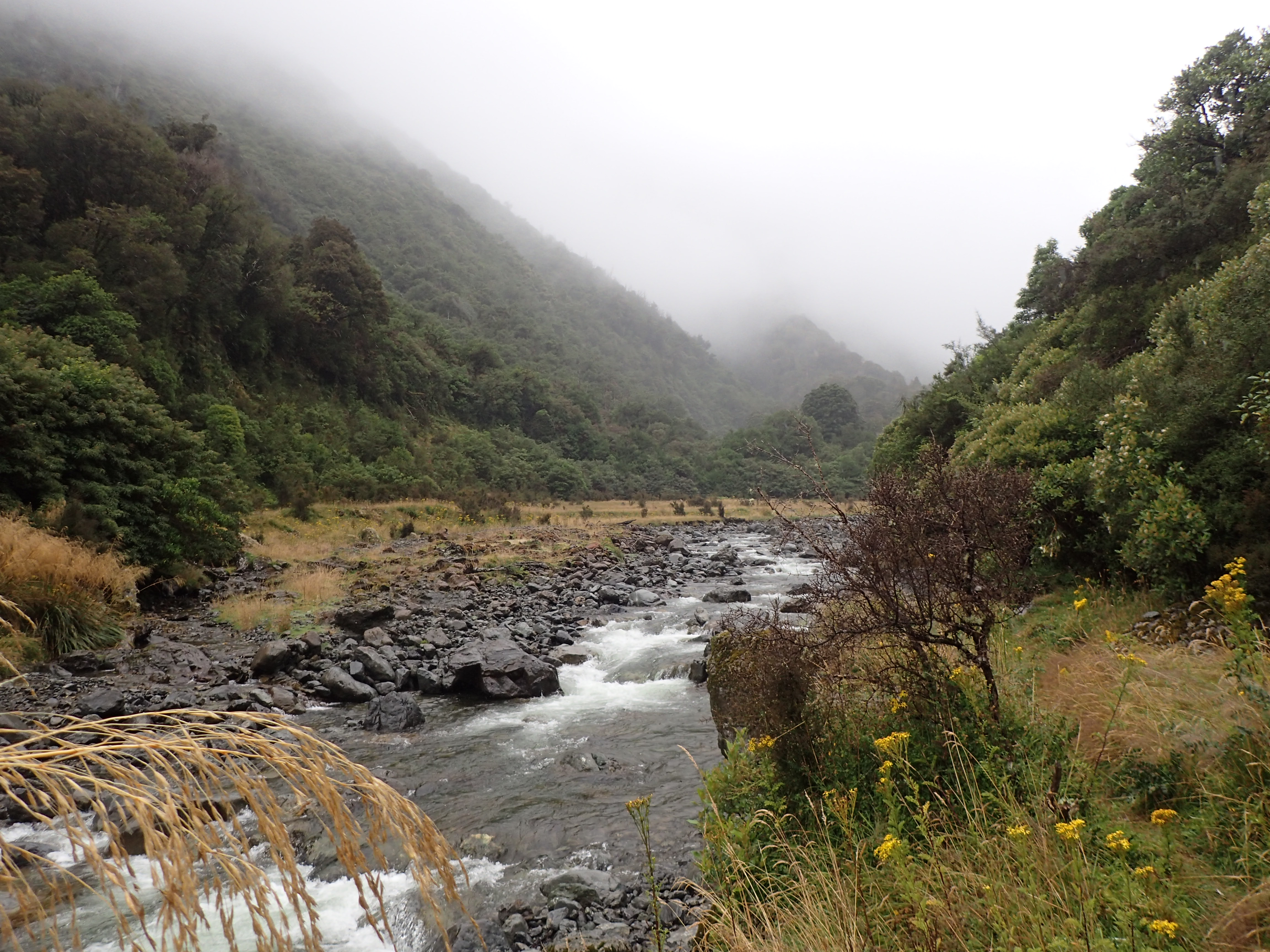
Taramakau River near its source at the Harper Pass

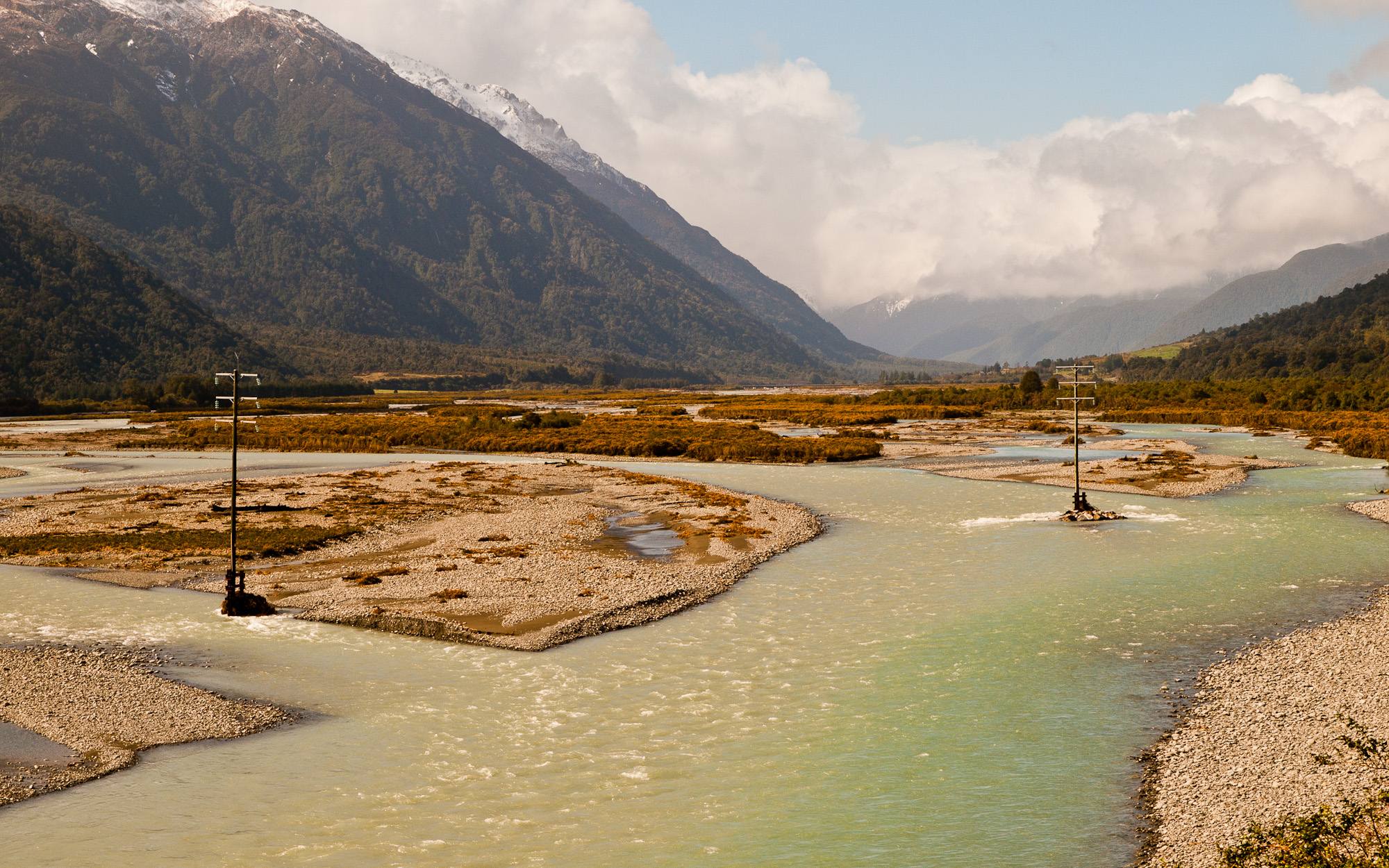
Taramakau River Valley

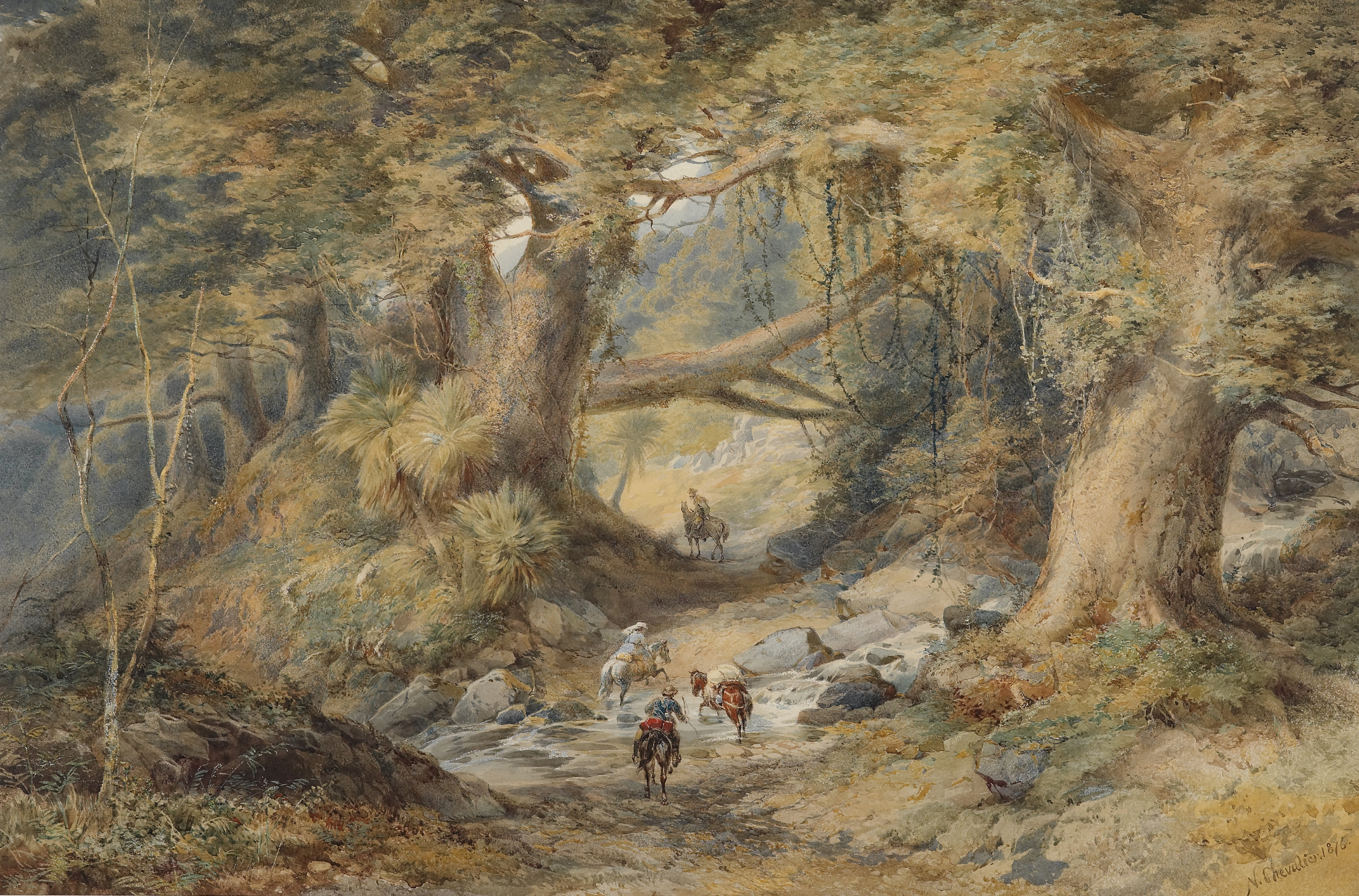
Crossing the Taramakau, Nicholas Chevalier (1866)

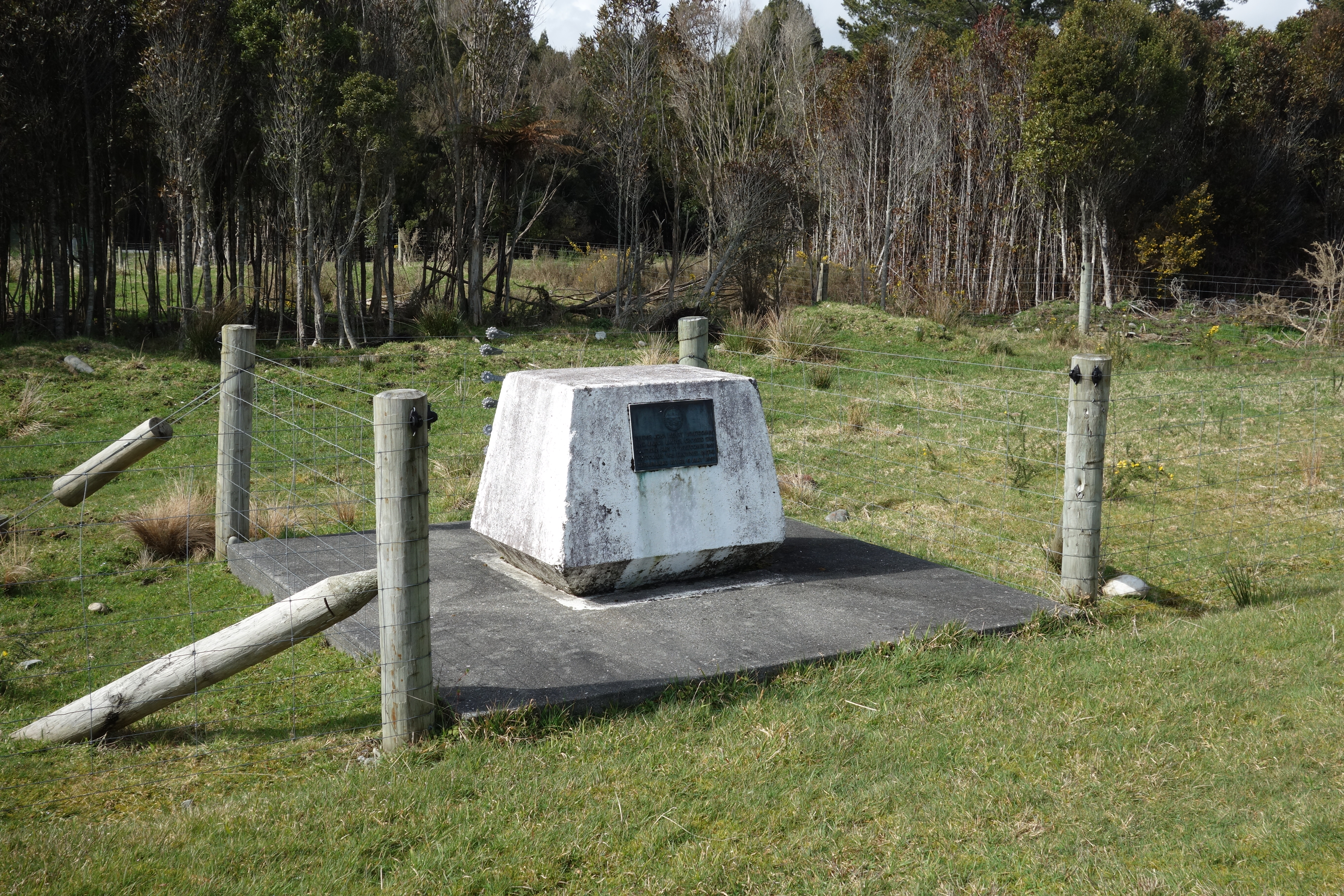
Memorial to Henry Whitcombe at the road-rail bridge

== Bibliography ==
- Leitch, David; Scott, Brian (1995). Exploring New Zealand's Ghost Railways (1998 ed.). Wellington: Grantham House. ISBN 1-86934-048-5.
