= Collet (disambiguation) =

A collet is a holding device, a subtype of chuck.

Collet may also refer to:

- Collet (name)
- Collet baronets, St Clere in the parish of Ightham in the County of Kent, was a title in the Baronetage of the United Kingdom
- Collet v. Collet, a Supreme Court of the United States decision
- The root–hypocotyl transition zone of a plant
- The Dream Collet, a magical book in the Yes! PreCure 5 anime

== See also ==
- Abismo Guy Collet, the deepest cave in South America
- Le Collet-de-Dèze, a commune in the Lozère department in southern France
- Collet (Belize House constituency), a Belize City-based constituency of the Belize House of Representatives
- Collets Bookshop, Charing Cross Road, London, founded by Eva Collet Reckitt (1890–1976)
- Colet, a surname
- Collett (disambiguation)
- Colette (1873–1954), French novelist nominated for the Nobel Prize in Literature in 1948
- Collette (disambiguation)

== People ==
- Constant Collet (1889–1937), French racing cyclist. He finished in last place in the 1910 Tour de France
- Philippe Collet (born 1963), French pole vaulter
- Thierry Collet, Mauritian football player who currently plays for Pointe-aux-Sables Mates in the Mauritian Premier League and for the Mauritius national football team as a midfielder
- Vincent Collet (born 1963), French former professional basketball player and a current professional basketball coach.
- Wilfred Collet (1856–1929), British colonial administrator who was governor of British Honduras and then of British Guiana
- Mery Godigna Collet (born 1959), Venezuelan artist, writer, philanthropist and environmental advocate living in Austin, Texas
- Guy Christian Collet (1929–2004), French scientist, explorer and spelunker who came to live in Brazil after the World War II
- Caio Collet (born 2002), Brazilian racing driver
- Collet Bou Gergis
- Collet Brunel
- Mark Collet (disambiguation)
