= Collet (name) =

Collet is both a surname and a given name. Notable people with the name include:

Surname:

- Bernt Johan Collet (born 1941), eldest son of Chamberlain and Master of the Royal Hunt
- Caio Collet (born 2002), Brazilian racing driver
- Cédric Collet (born 1984), French Guadeloupean football midfielder
- Charles Collet, British Naval airman during the First World War
- Christopher Collet (born 1968), American actor
- Clara Collet (1860–1948), British sociologist
- David Collet (1901–1984), British rower who competed in the 1928 Summer Olympics
- Frédéric Justin Collet (1870–1966), French pathologist and otolaryngologist
- Henri Collet (1885–1951), French composer and music critic
- Hippolyte-Victor Collet-Descotils (1773–1815), French chemist
- Jaume Collet-Serra (born 1974), Spanish-American film director
- John Caskie Collet (1898–1955), United States federal judge in Missouri
- Mark Collet (disambiguation), multiple people with the name
- Marie Roxana Collet, Mauritian politician
- Philippe Collet (born 1963), retired French pole vaulter
- Pierre Collet (actor) (1914–1977), French film actor
- Pierre Collet (physicist) (born 1948), French mathematical physicist,
- Robert Collet (born 1948), French Thoroughbred racehorse trainer
- Ronald Collet Norman (1873–1963), banker, administrator and politician
- Sophia Dobson Collet (1822–1894), British feminist
- Stéphane Collet (born 1972), retired French-Malagasy football midfielder
- Vincent Collet (born 1963), French basketball coach

Given name:

- Collet Barker (1784–1831), military officer and explorer
- Collet Bou Gergis, birth name of Dina Hayek (born 1975), a popular Lebanese singer
- Collet Dobson Collet (1812–1898), radical freethinker, Chartist and campaigner against newspaper taxation

Fictional characters:

- Jérôme Collet, The Da Vinci Code character
- Collet Brunel, Tales of Symphonia character
