= List of massacres in New Zealand =

The following is a list of events that have been called massacres that have occurred in New Zealand (numbers may be approximate). Massacres considered part of the campaigns of the New Zealand Wars are listed separately.

== List ==
Name	Date	Location	Deaths	Method	Notes
2023 Auckland shooting Lower Queen Street in February 2023. One Queen Street is under construction in the centre, with the ferry terminal beyond it. Britomart station is at near right.	20 Jul 2023	Downtown Britomart Terminal, Auckland	3	Pump-action shotgun	Shooter among dead
Christchurch mosque shootings Christchurch Mosque (Al Noor Mosque (Arabic: مسجد النور, Masjid al-Noor)), Christchurch, New Zealand.	15 Mar 2019	Christchurch, Canterbury	51	Semi-automatic rifles, shotguns, lever-action rifle, bolt-action rifle	51 killed and 40 injured. Occurred at two mosques in Christchurch: Al Noor Mosque and Linwood Islamic Centre. Australian-born perpetrator Brenton Harrison Tarrant pleaded guilty to murder and engaging in a terrorist act, and was sentenced to life imprisonment without parole.
Raurimu massacre	8 Feb 1997	Raurimu, King Country	6	Firearm (sawn off single-barrelled shotgun)	Also 4 wounded. Stephen Anderson found not guilty of murder by reason of insanity.
New Empire Hotel arson	4 Feb 1995	Hamilton	6	Fire	Alan Wayne Lory convicted of manslaughter.
Bain family murders Memorial to the Cullen Bain family in Mosgiel.	20 Jun 1994	Dunedin	5	Firearm (.22lr semi-auto)	David Bain convicted, but acquitted in a re-trial.
Ratima family murders	26 Jun 1992	Masterton	7	Hammer, knife	Raymond Wahia Ratima convicted of murder.
Schlaepfer family murders	20 May 1992	Paerata, Auckland Region	7		Shooter (Brian Schlaepfer) among dead.
Aramoana massacre	13–14 Nov 1990	Aramoana, Otago	14	Firearm (scoped semi-automatic rifle)	3 (unofficially 4) injuries. Shooter (David Gray) among dead.
Bassett Road machine gun murders	7 Dec 1963	Auckland	2		
Noema Rika murders	27 May 1951	Ōtaki, Kāpiti Coast	5		Shooter (Rika) among dead
Featherston prisoner of war camp strike	25 Feb 1943	Featherston, Wairarapa	49		80 wounded
1941 Kowhitirangi shootings	8–20 Oct 1941	Kowhitirangi, West Coast	8		Shooter (Stanley Graham) among dead
Henare Hona murders [Family Murders plus policeman.]	21 Oct 1934	Morrinsville, Waikato	6		Shooter (Hona) among dead
Himatangi massacre	6 Sep 1929	Himatangi, Manawatu	8		Unsolved shooting and arson, possibly murder/suicide
Waikino schoolhouse shooting	19 Oct 1923	Waikino, near Waihi	2	Firearm (.32-cal pistol), also armed with 3 sticks of gelignite (not used)	Also 6 others wounded. Local farmer John Christopher Higgins sought revenge over alleged persecution
Invercargill Tragedy [Baxter Family Murders]	8 Apr 1908	Invercargill	7	Stove scraper, firearm	Killer (James Reid Baxter) among dead
Maungatapu murders	21 Feb 1866	Maungatapu, Tasman	5		Three members of a gang led by Richard Burgess were hanged for the murders
Finnigan family murders	Sep 1865	Otahuhu, Auckland	4		Also spelt Finnegan in contemporary sources. James Stack was convicted and hanged in April 1866
Maketū Wharetōtara murders	1841	Kororareka, Northland	5		Maketū Wharetōtara, also known as Wiremu Kīngi Maketū, became the first person officially executed in New Zealand (7 March 1842)
Invasion of the Chatham Islands and Moriori genocide	Nov 1835	Chatham Islands	2000	Part of the Musket Wars	The Moriori genocide was the systematic mass murder, ethnic cleansing, enslavement and cultural annihilation of the Moriori people, the indigenous ethnic group of the Chatham Islands (Rēkohu), by invaders from the mainland New Zealand iwi of Ngāti Tama and Ngāti Mutunga, from November 1835 for a disputed time onward.
Siege of Pukerangiora	Nov 1831	Waitara River, Taranaki	1200	Part of the Musket Wars	
Boyd massacre	Dec 1809	Whangaroa Harbour, Northland	66		
Reprisal attacks following death of Marc-Joseph Marion du Fresne	13 Jun 1772 to July 1772	Bay of Islands, Northland	250		
Death of Marc-Joseph Marion du Fresne	12 Jun 1772	Bay of Islands, Northland	26		

== Massacres during the New Zealand Wars ==
The following is a list of events that have been called massacres that occurred as part of the New Zealand Wars (numbers may be approximate):

Name	Date	Location	Deaths	Notes
Opepe Massacre	7 June 1869	Taupo	9	Part of Te Kooti's War
Mohaka massacre	10 April 1869	Mohaka, Hawke's Bay	68	Part of Te Kooti's War
Pukearuhe massacre	13 February 1869	Pukearuhe, Taranaki	8	Attack on Pukearuhe Redoubt by a Ngāti Maniapoto war party
Ngatapa massacre	5 January 1869	Ngatapa, Gisborne	120	Part of Te Kooti's War
Poverty Bay massacre	10 November 1868	Poverty Bay, Gisborne	54	Part of Te Kooti's War
Rangiaowhia massacre	21 February 1864	Rangiaowhia, Waikato	11	Part of the Waikato War
Gilfillan family killings	18 April 1847	Wanganui	4	An act of utu (revenge) for the killing of a Māori chieftain during the Wanganui Campaign
Wairau Affray	17 June 1843	Tuamarina, Marlborough	26	8 wounded
