= Edward Dobson =

New Zealand surveyor and engineer (1816/17–1908)

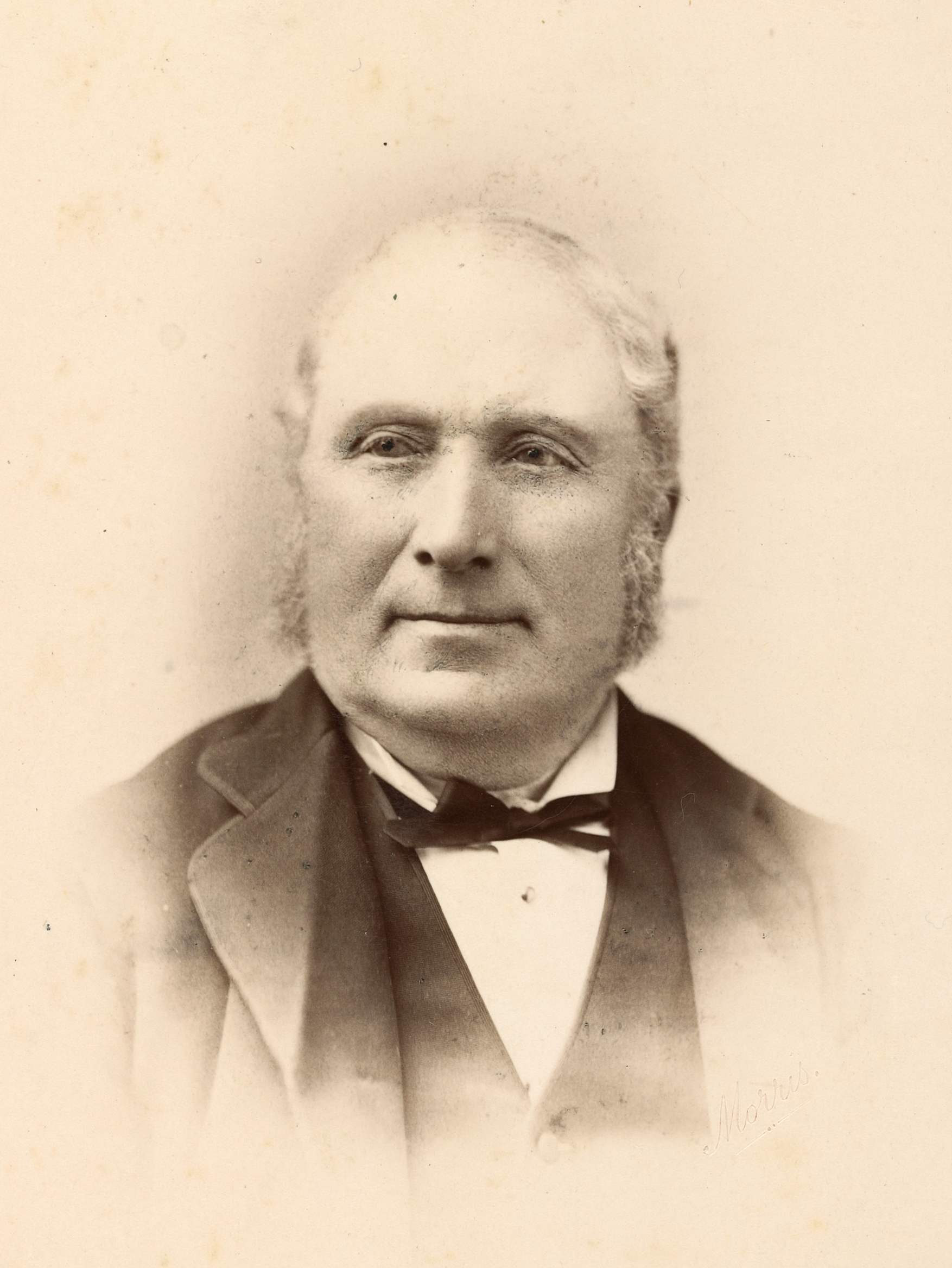
- Edward Dobson in his 80s
- Born: 8 December 1816; London
- Died: 19 September 1908 (aged 91); Christchurch
- Education: University College London
- Spouse: Mary Ann Lough
- Children: Arthur Dudley Dobson
- Engineering career
- Discipline: railway, civil, surveying
- Projects: Lyttelton Rail Tunnel
- Significant design: Midland Line
- Awards: Telford Medal

Edward Dobson (1816/17? – 19 September 1908) was Provincial Engineer for Canterbury Province, New Zealand from 1854 to 1868.

== Early life ==
Edward Dobson was born in London, probably in 1816 or 1817. His parents were John Dobson, a merchant, and Elizabeth Barker (1787–1875). Collet Dobson Collet (1812–1898) was his brother, Clara Collet (1860–1948) was his niece, and Sophia Dobson Collet (1822–1894) his sister. Collet Barker was an uncle, an elder brother of his mother.

By the time he started his apprenticeship as an architect and surveyor in 1832, his father had died. He made a sketching tour of the European Continent, his drawings from which were exhibited in the architecture section of the Royal Academy. While practicing as an architect and surveyor, he attended University College London to study engineering, and by 1843 he had graduated with certificates of honour in architecture and civil engineering.

Edward Dobson married Mary Ann Lough (1821–1913) on 7 May 1839 at Shoreditch, London, and they were to have ten children.

He became an associate of the Institution of Civil Engineers on 1 March 1842, and a full member on 29 March 1881. He also wrote a number of practical books on engineering subjects. From 1844 to 1850 he was on the staff of John Urpeth Rastrick, working as a railway engineer in Nottingham from 1846 to 1849.

== Emigration to New Zealand ==
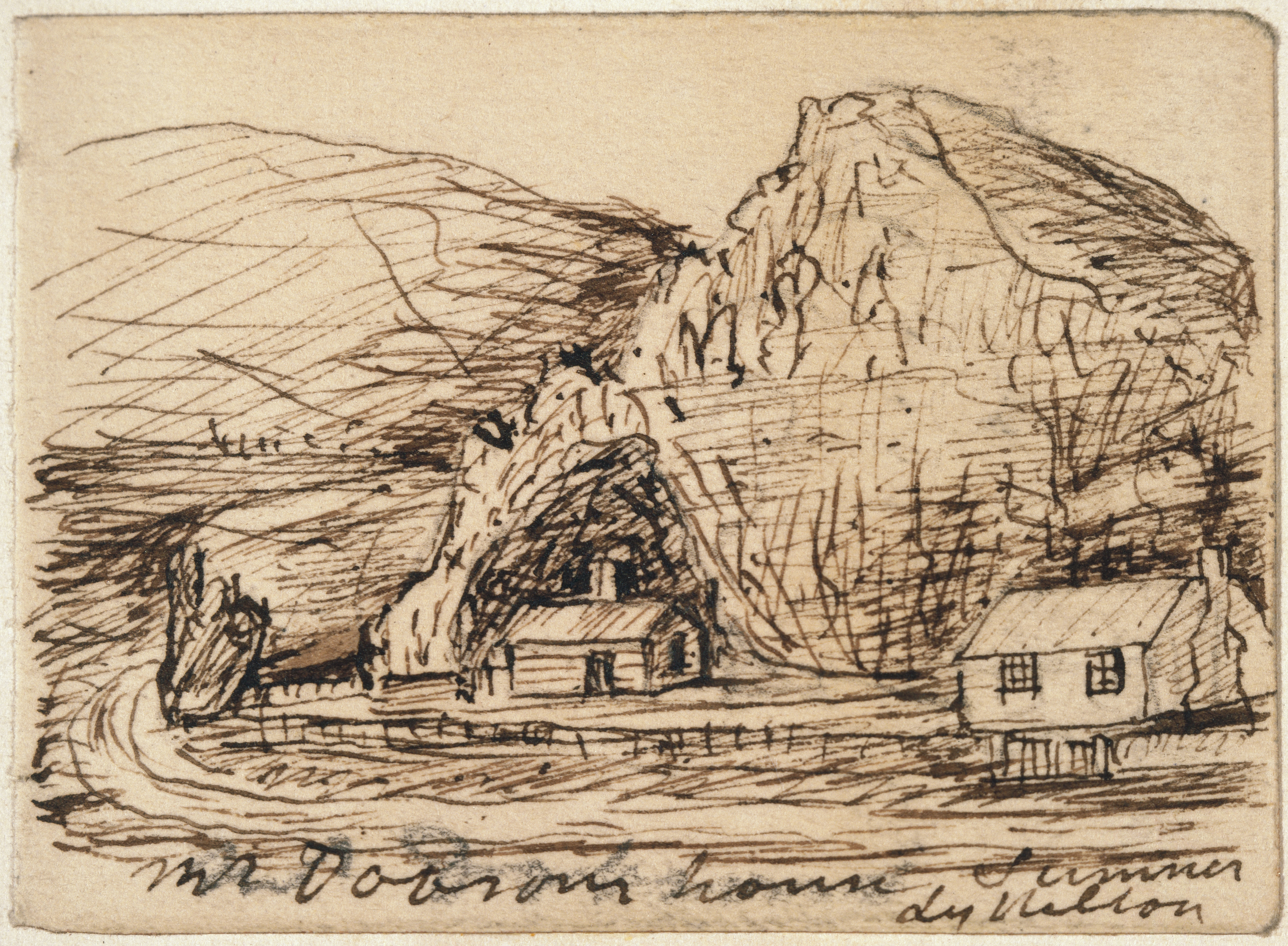
Two small buildings in Sumner, one of which belonged to Dobson (pencil sketch, 1865)

With two of his children, George (1840–1866) and Arthur Dudley (1841–1934), Dobson emigrated to Canterbury on the Cressy, one of the First Four Ships. The Cressy arrived in Lyttelton on 27 December 1850. Dobson was one of the original purchasers of land from the Canterbury Association.

Life with two young sons was challenging, and they were sent to their uncle, Reverend Charles Dobson, the vicar of Buckland in Tasmania. After three years, they returned to New Zealand and initially stayed with another uncle, the surveyor Alfred Dobson.

His wife followed on the Fatima and arrived in Lyttelton exactly one year later, on 27 December 1851. She had the other children with her: Mary Ann (1844–1913), Caroline (1845–1932), Edward Henry (1847–1934) and Maria Eliza (b. 1848). The remaining children were born in New Zealand: Robert (1852–1893), Emily Frances (1857–1943), Herbert Alex (1860–1948) and Collet Barker (1861–1926).

== Professional life ==
New Zealand

In New Zealand, he was responsible for designing and overseeing the construction of many important public works, having been appointed provincial engineer in 1854. He designed a system of railways for the province, and by the time he retired, the Canterbury Great Southern Railway had reached Lyttelton and advanced as far south as the Selwyn River.

His son Arthur was apprenticed to him and an early task for the father and son team was to determine the depth of mud in Lyttelton Harbour. They then surveyed the Rangiora main drain, which resulted in reclaiming 20,000 acres (81 km^{2}) of swamp land. Edward Dobson supervised the construction of the Ferrymead Railway, connecting the wharf in Ferrymead with Christchurch and opening on 1 December 1863. This was New Zealand's first public railway. A telegraph line was built along the rail corridor between Lyttelton and Christchurch, and when it opened on 1 July 1862, it was the first telegraph line in New Zealand. New Zealand Post celebrated the centenary with the publication of two commemorative stamps.

Edward Dobson's most important project was the superintendency of the Lyttelton Rail Tunnel, an engineering feat that is recognised with a Category I heritage protection by Heritage New Zealand. His son Arthur prepared many of the sectional drawings. Shortly afterwards, the Ferrymead branch line was closed, and it became the first public railway to be disused in the country.

The chief surveyor, Thomas Cass, commissioned Arthur Dobson in 1864 to find out whether there is a suitable pass from the Waimakariri watershed to the West Coast. George and Arthur Dobson set out in March 1864, later to be joined by their brother Edward at Craigieburn. While George surveyed road lines there, Edward and Arthur proceeded to explore the high country. On the advice of West Coast Māori chief Tarapuhi, they found a pass that steeply descended to what became known as Otira; the route had long been used by Māori for trading pounamu. Arthur prepared a report, which included a sketch of the unnamed pass, and presented it to Cass.

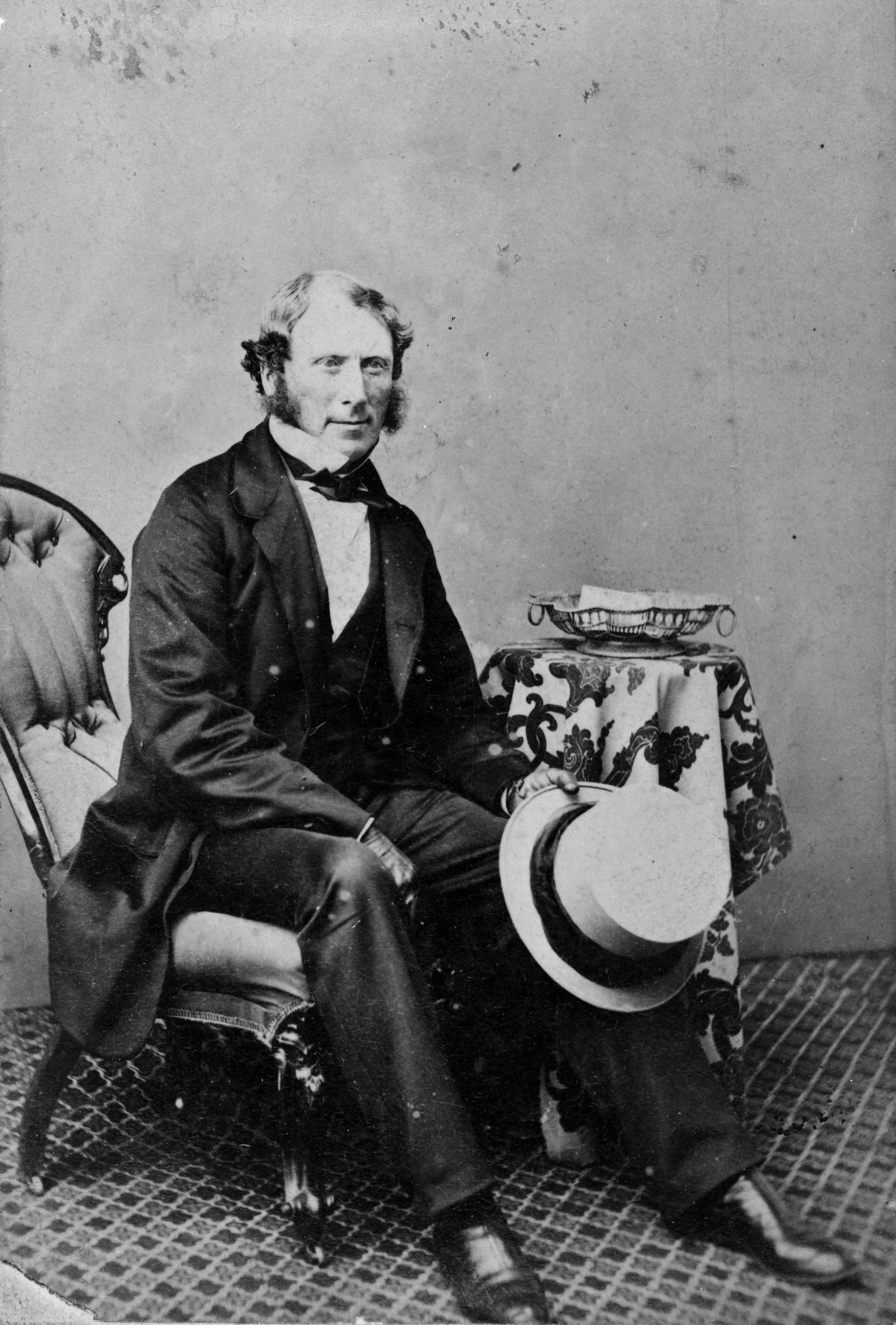
Edward Dobson, ca 1866

Soon after, the discovery of gold triggered the West Coast gold rush. Edward Dobson was commissioned to examine every possible pass to the West Coast from the watersheds of the Waimakariri, Taramakau and Hurunui Rivers. After finishing his examination, he declared that "Arthur's pass" was by far the most suitable to get to the gold fields. The provincial government decided that a road was to be built between Christchurch and Hokitika, a distance of 156 miles (251 km), and Edward Dobson was put in charge of the project. The road was opened on 20 March 1866. The alpine pass became known as Arthur's Pass, with a nearby village and a later a national park also taking this name.

Australia

Dobson resigned as provincial engineer in 1868 and moved to Australia the following year. He undertook engineering work for a railway company in Melbourne, and water supply engineering work in Melbourne and Geelong. He returned to New Zealand in 1876.

New Zealand again

In 1878, Edward Dobson went into a formal partnership with his son Arthur, which lasted until 1885. They were working on water supply schemes for Timaru and the Canterbury Plains. They surveyed the Midland Line over the Southern Alps and, in partnership with others, launched the Midland Railway Company. The venture was a failure, as it was underfunded. Eventually, the government took over the scheme, but the line between Christchurch and Greymouth was not finished until 1923.

In his later years, Edward Dobson concentrated on education. He had lectured since the 1860s, and his lectures to the Christchurch High School are regarded as "the first attempt to make Physical Science a branch of regular instruction in this colony". He published papers for the Philosophical Institute of Canterbury and the Institution of Civil Engineers in London, which awarded him the Telford Medal for the 1868–1869 session for a paper entitled The public works of the province of Canterbury, New Zealand.

He helped establish the Engineering School of the Canterbury College, which became the University of Canterbury, and lectured until 1892. Dobson published several books on engineering.

== Family and death ==
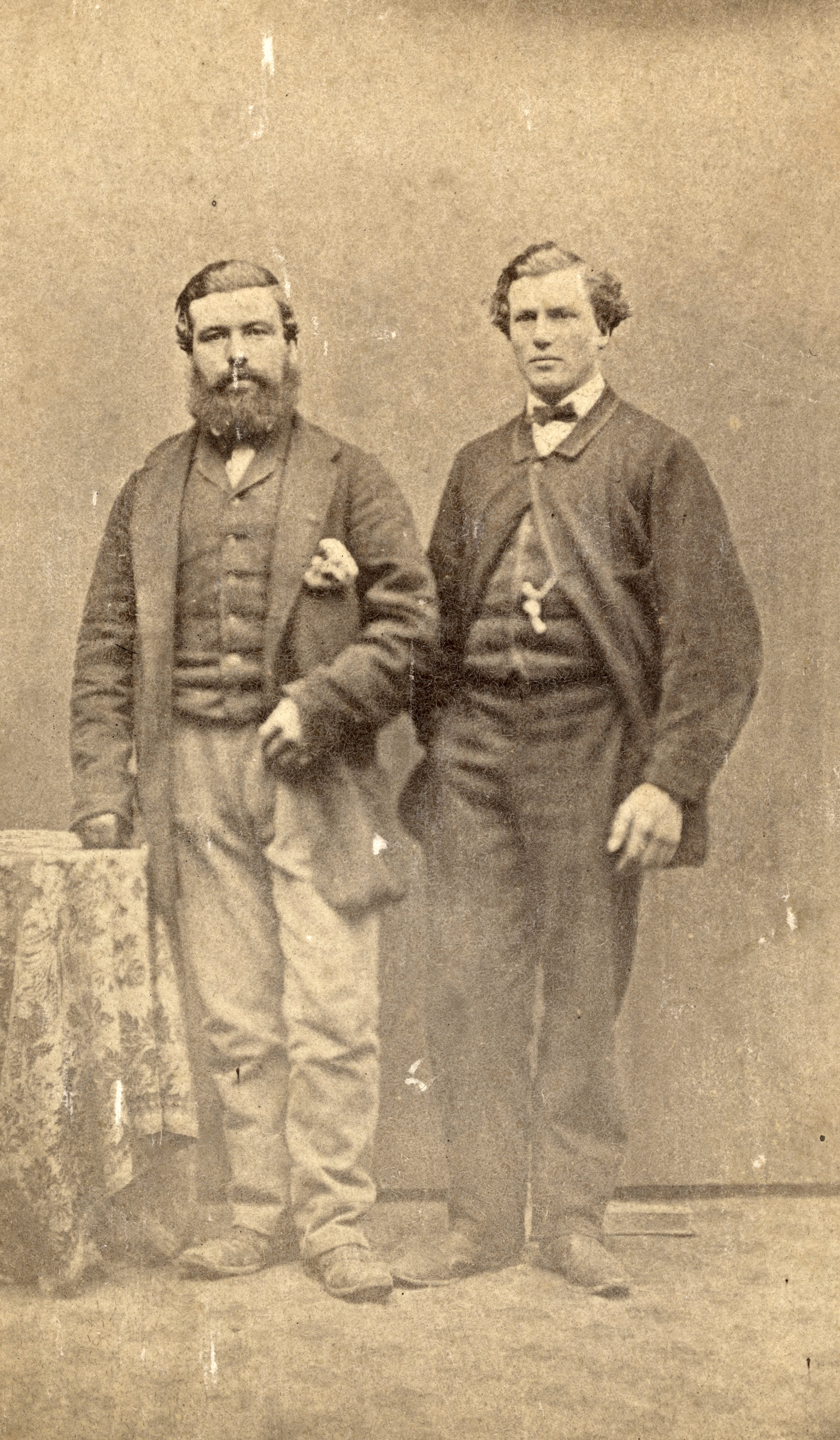
George Dobson (1840–1866; right) and Herbert Howitt, taken before 1863

Life improved when Edward Dobson was appointed Provincial Engineer. He built a cob cottage in Sumner, and another house in central Christchurch in the block described by Tuam, Manchester and High Streets. He could afford to send his sons to Christ's College, then the best school in Christchurch.

His sons Sir Arthur Dudley Dobson and Edward Dobson (1847–1934) became prominent in New Zealand, both having been pioneer surveyors. Son George Dobson (1840–1866) was murdered by Richard Burgess and the other Maungatapu murderers.

His daughter Mary married Sir Julius von Haast in 1863.

Edward Dobson died on 19 September 1908. He is buried at St Paul's in Papanui. His wife died on 29 December 1913. His tombstone reads:

Associate and Member of the Institute of Civil Engineers. Arrived in Canterbury 1850. First Provincial Engineer, 1854, and Engineer to the Moorhouse Tunnel. 'His life's desire was that his labours might be of benefit to his fellow Colonists'.

== Publications ==
- An Historical, Statistical, and Scientific Account of the Railways of Belgium from 1834 to 1842 (London, John Weale, 1843)
- Rudiments of the Art of Building (London, John Weale, 1849)
- A Rudimentary Treatise on Masonry and Stonecutting (London, John Weale, 1849)
- A Rudimentary Treatise on Foundations and Concrete Works (London, John Weale, 1850)
- A Rudimentary Treatise on the Manufacture of Bricks and Tiles (London, John Weale, 1850)
- Pioneer Engineering: A Treatise on the Engineering Operations Connected with the Settlement of Waste Lands in New Countries (London, Crosby Lockwood and Co., 1877)
