= Collet Barker =

British military officer and explorer

- Born: 31 December 1784; Hackney, Middlesex, England
- Died: 30 April 1831 (aged 46); Younghusband Peninsula, Coorong, South Australia, Australia
- Burial place: Unknown
- Military career
- Allegiance: United Kingdom
- Branch: British Army
- Service years: 1806–1831
- Rank: Captain
- Units: 39th Regiment of Foot
- Conflicts: Peninsular War

Collet Barker (31 December 1784 – 30 April 1831) was a British military officer and explorer. He was commandant at two British outposts for the Colony of New South Wales. Fort Wellington on the Cobourg Peninsula, Northern Territory and a penal settlement at King George Sound (Western Australia). Following the closure of the penal settlement at King George's Sound, at the direction of the Governor, whilst he was enroute to Sydney he explored areas of Southern Australia along the eastern shore of Gulf St Vincent, the southern Mount Lofty Ranges, Adelaide Plains and overland from Yankalilla Bay on Fleurieu Peninsula to the Murray Mouth before being killed whilst on duty.

== Early life ==
Barker was born in Hackney, England, son of William Barker and his wife Sarah Collet and lived in Newbury as a child. He joined the British Army on 23 January 1806, as an ensign by purchase in the 39th Regiment of Foot; he became a lieutenant in 1809 and a captain in 1825. Barker served in Sicily in 1807-11 and was a veteran of the Peninsular Wars, serving in Portugal, Spain, and France. He also served in Canada and Ireland before embarking with his regiment, the 39th Regiment of Foot 1st Battalion, on the prison convict hulk Phoenix for Australia; which arrived in Port Jackson, Sydney on 14 July 1828.

=== Northern Territory ===
On 13 September 1828 he arrived as the new commandant of Fort Wellington, the settlement at Raffles Bay in the Northern Territory.

When Barker arrived to take up command at Fort Wellington, relations between the Aboriginal people and the settlers under the previous command of Captain Henry Smyth had deteriorated to the point of mutual fear and hostility. In his first dispatch to Governor Darling, Barker reported, "Nothing has been seen of the Natives for a considerable time; they appear to have deserted the immediate neighbourhood". A series of thefts and spearings by the Aborigines led to the former commandant offering a reward of five pounds for "any native who could be brought in, hoping that, by keeping such individual at the settlement, it might have the effect of preventing any further hostility".

The result of this, to further quote Darling, was a "very gross outrage". A six-year-old Aboriginal girl named Riveral was captured during a raid on an encampment by six men from the settlement, including armed convicts. Private Charles Miller, in evidence sworn to an enquiry, stated the following.

At this time two fires appeared close to the beach... they proceeded onward and discovered four others and made for them... they found them close to each other and from fifty to sixty natives surrounded them, whose voices they heard through the thick scrub, before they saw them their mode of attack was then formed, they went round the scrub and got sight of them within 40 yards; three of the party then advanced and fired, in order to strike panic into them and to enable the party to take some of them prisoners; it had the desired effect for a moment, for they all started but very soon returned and commenced throwing their spears very fast. The other two stand of arms loaded and in reserve with two men in the rear... and immediately discharged... they again fled, some into the bush and others into the water... One man apparently badly wounded crept on his hand and knees towards the water; a woman also had retreated towards the water, but returned for two children whom she took up and made again for the water; they afterwards discovered the whole of these four had been wounded, which he supposed were by some of the first five shots. Volunteer James Murray and himself endeavoured to take the woman and child prisoners; she was a very large and powerful woman. She made desperate resistance, rushed into the water, and he gave her a wound with the bayonet; this he certainly should not have done had he been certain it was a woman; but fearing that an escape would be made, he was determined if possible to secure the person. The children were afterwards brought on shore, one was dead and the other was slightly wounded; the woman fell and he supposed died in the water.

It was with this background that Collet Barker began his command, on 13 September 1828. Barker first made contact with the local Aboriginal people on 25 November 1828, when Costello the stockman reported that he had made contact. Barker and Davis the surgeon were taken to the place of contact, where they met ten men, whom they presented with handkerchiefs, a pair of scissors, and some bread. The group invited Barker to accompany them, which Barker declined to do, though he tried to convey that he would be pleased to do so another time. Barker recorded his second contact with the local inhabitants in his journal, dated 2 December 1828, as follows.

... as we were cruising along the shore some natives were discovered. We made friendly signs to each other and I ran the boat in and landed unarmed desiring everyone else to remain in the boat. On our approach to the beach the natives returned some distance from it, evidently in a little alarm. I advanced to show I supposed them to be, and soon fell in with one who seemed to be a chief. We exchanged presents, I giving him a handkerchief and he giving me a spear, unheaded, and the stick for throwing it. He had perhaps taken off the head. He also gave me a string of beads...I asked for Wellington and he pointed to himself and repeated the name. Another native soon came up and afterwards a third. They did not want me to go with them and appeared rather in a hurry. When I got on board again I found there was a bit of bread in the boat and I sent my servant with it. The doctor went with him. They ate up the bread immediately and the chief took off a pair of bracelets and gave them to the doctor.

It was soon after this that the aborigines approached the settlement and were induced to enter by Barker's sending Norrie, their Malay interpreter's daughter, to take Wellington's hand and lead him into the fort. Over the following months, Barker had restored relations to the point where he was able to go off alone with the locals on trips for days at a time with complete safety.

One of the reasons for the establishment of the settlement was to try to establish commercial contacts with the Malay or Macassan fishers who regularly sailed their proas to the Northern shores of Australia in search of the trepang, or sea-slugs, which they traded with the Chinese. Over the course of the year over 1000 seafarers visited the shores of Raffles Bay and showed keen interest in establishing trade with Barker's outpost. Barker in his journals, records many Aboriginal names, words and aspects of Aboriginal culture gleaned through the regular contact that was developed with the local inhabitants. There continued to be sources of friction between the two cultures, especially the theft of the settlement's canoes. Barker solved this by negotiating to lend the canoes and found that by the July, they were being returned with fish and tortoise shell in them as thanks.

Orders to abandon the settlement had been received before Barker's dispatches reporting the success of his contacts with the Macassan fishers and the improvements in their relations with the Aboriginal inhabitants could affect the outcome of Governor Darling's decision. Barker then moved on to become commandant of the British settlement at King George Sound, stopping off at the new settlement of Swan River, Perth, on the way.

=== Western Australia ===
The following year Barker was commander at King George Sound in Western Australia. Barker was an excellent administrator and proved to be a humane friend to the Indigenous people at both commands. He recorded Aboriginal place names, people, traditions and beliefs which otherwise might have been lost.

=== South Australia ===
In 1831, on the recommendation of Charles Sturt, who had visited the shoaled mouth of the Murray River the previous year, Barker was sent to explore the east coast of Gulf St Vincent in South Australia to see if another channel from the Murray entered the sea there.

On 13 April 1831, Barker and his party arrived at Cape Jervis on the Isabella. He examined the coast as far north as present day Port Gawler and found that there was no channel. Barker encountered the Onkaparinga River on 15 April. He then explored the ranges inland, north of the present site of Adelaide, and climbed Mount Lofty Ranges (without reaching the summit) where he sighted the Port River inlet, Barker Inlet and the future Port Adelaide, his most important sighting. He then moored Isabella near present Yankalilla Bay and went overland to explore the area around Lake Alexandrina and Encounter Bay.

=== Death ===
On 29 April 1831, they reached the Murray Mouth. Barker swam across the narrow channel the next morning, went over a sandhill, and was never seen again. A few days later the party learned that Barker had been killed by the local Ngarrindjeri people. Sturt surmised they may have taken him for a whaler or sealer, many of whom had abducted Indigenous women. The men responsible had been identified, but no retaliation or punitive action against those believed responsible was undertaken, which one commentator believed emboldened those people to commit further attacks on Europeans, notably the Maria survivors.

Had he lived, Barker was to have been sent by Governor Darling to New Zealand's North Island as first resident because of the feared Māori unrest; his role was to conciliate.

== Recognitions ==
In December 1829, Mount Barker, Western Australia was named after Captain Collet Barker, whilst he was commandant of the garrison at King George Sound, by a naval ship's surgeon Thomas Braidwood Wilson.

In 1830 and 1831 Barker was made a Justice of the peace of Peace in the Colony of New South Wales

Mount Barker was named for him by Captain Sturt, who erroneously thought it was Mount Lofty, and the eponymous town is named for the mountain.

Barker Inlet near Port Adelaide is also named for him which he sited from the Mount Lofty Ranges and explored the inlet between the 17 and 21 April 1831. Later travelling southwards he discovered a clear stream which he named Sturt River.

In 1903 the Australian electoral division of Division of Barker in South Australia was named after him.

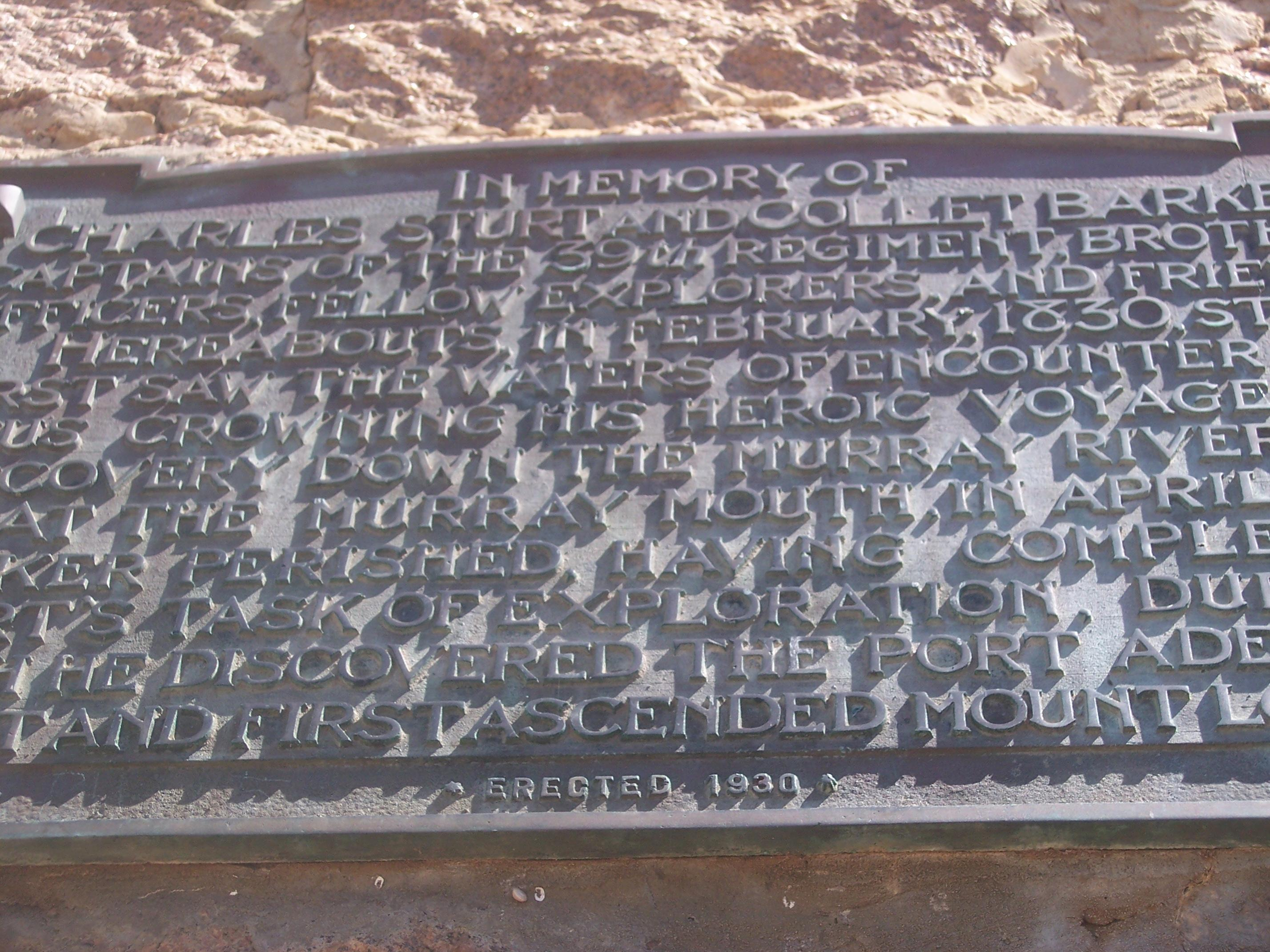
Plaque on a monument dedicated to Captain Charles Sturt and Collet Barker, on Hindmarsh Island.

== Personal life ==
Barker never married. His nearest relations were Collet Dobson Collet, nephew; Clara Collet, great niece; Edward Dobson, New Zealand engineer, nephew; and great nephews, Sir Arthur Dudley Dobson, New Zealand survey engineer, and George Dobson, New Zealand surveyor, who was murdered in 1866 by the Burgess gang.

== See also ==
- List of solved missing person cases (pre-1950)
