= Wilfred Collet =

British colonial administrator (1856–1929)

Sir Wilfred Collet KCMG

Governor of British Honduras
- In office 19 May 1913 – January 1918
- Preceded by: Eric John Eagles Swayne
- Succeeded by: William Hart-Bennett

Governor of British Guiana
- In office 15 April 1917 – 4 April 1923
- Preceded by: Walter Egerton
- Succeeded by: Graeme Thomson

Personal details
- Born: 23 November 1856 Islington, London
- Died: 29 June 1929
- Resting place: Highgate Cemetery
- Citizenship: British

Sir Wilfred Collet KCMG (23 November 1856 – 1929) was a British colonial administrator who was governor of British Honduras and then of British Guiana.

== Background ==
Wilfred Collet was born in Islington, London in 1856, the son of noted radical reformer Collet Dobson Collet and nephew of Sophia Dobson Collet and Edward Dobson. His family had a tradition of overseas service. A great-great-great uncle, Joseph Collett, had been an official in the East India Company and President of Madras (8 January 1717 – 18 January 1720). His sister Clara Collet (1860–1948) was a noted social reformer during the early part of the twentieth century.

He studied music at Trinity College, London. In 1875, he and his sister Clara were frequently in contact with the Karl Marx family. Wilfred Collet obtained his degree from University College, London in 1881 and joined the Colonial service.

== Early career ==
In the British colonial service, Collet held the positions of Assistant Native Commissioner, Fiji, Secretary to the High Commissioner, West Pacific (1884–1897), and then District Commissioner, Cyprus (1897–1905). In 1905 he was appointed Colonial Secretary, British Honduras. On 9 May 1913, he was appointed Governor of British Honduras, holding office until January 1918. In 1915 he was knighted.

== Governor of British Guiana ==
Collet was Governor of British Guiana from 15 April 1917 until 4 April 1923, when he retired.

In February 1922, a three-man delegation from India visited British Guiana, consisting of the Deputy President of the Madras Legislative Assembly, and member of the Servants of India Society and the Director of Agriculture of Bombay. The delegation wanted to discuss a proposal for translocating Indian labourers to work on the sugar plantations. Collet was not favourable to the scheme but eventually proposed a new plan with much fewer benefits. The Indians also were not entirely positive since the price of sugar was falling, so wages would fall also. No decision had been made when Collet retired in 1923, handing over to Sir Graeme Thomson.

== Other ==
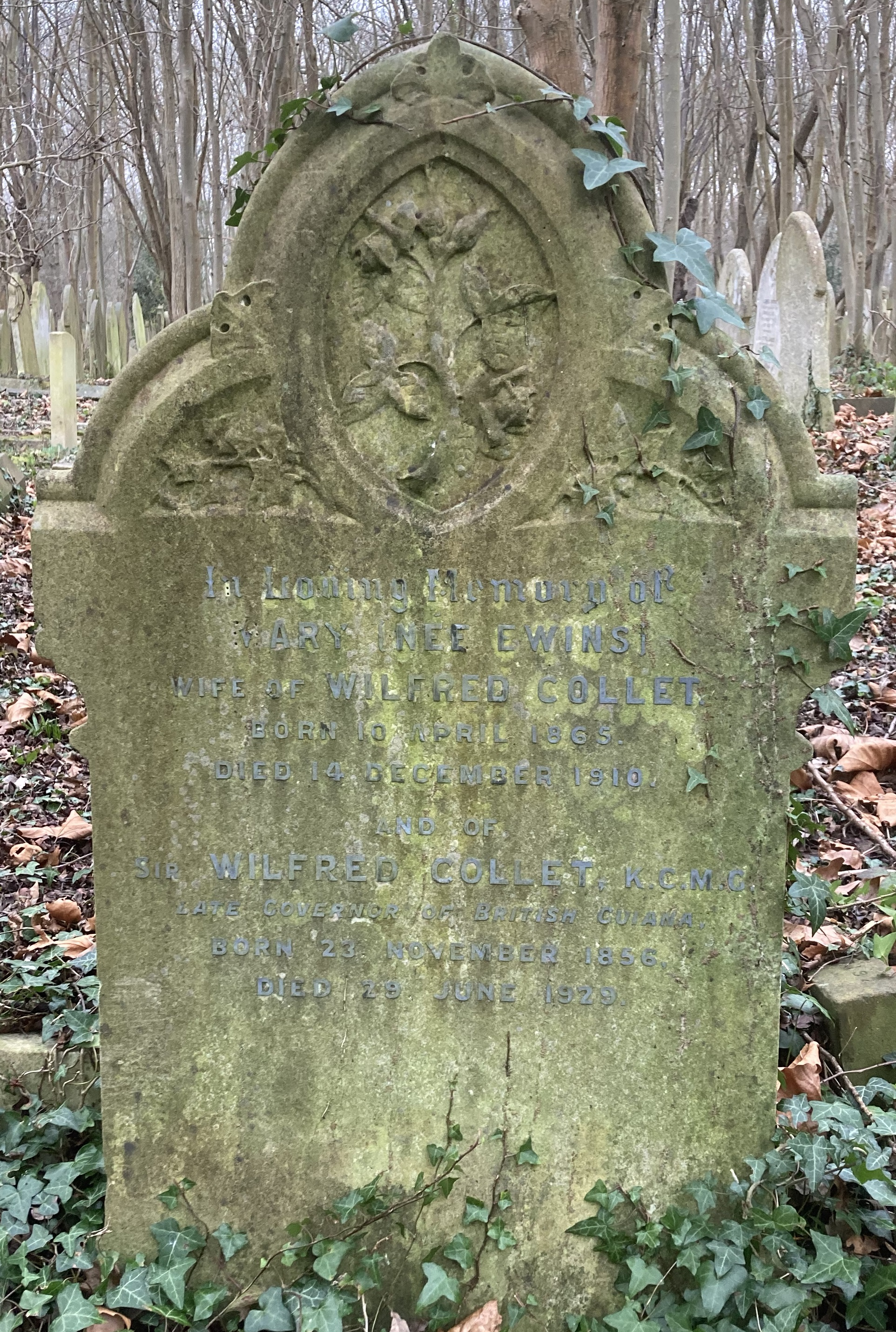
Grave of Sir Wilfred Collet in Highgate Cemetery

In 1926, Collet was a member of the Polynesian Society.

He was appointed Companion of the Order of St Michael and St George (C.M.G.) in 1897 and knighted (K.C.M.G.) in 1915.

He died on 29 June 1929 and was buried on the eastern side of Highgate Cemetery.

== Works ==
- British Honduras and its resources
