= Sophia Dobson Collet =

English feminist freethinker

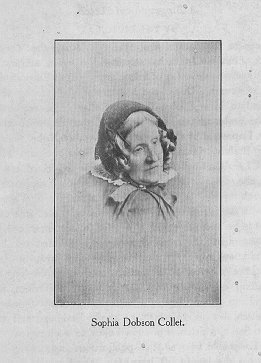
- Portrait taken from The Life and Letters of Raja Rammohun Roy, edited by Hem Chandra Sarkar (1914)
- Born: Sophia Dobson; 1 February 1822; St. Pancras, London, England
- Died: 27 March 1894 (aged 72); Highbury, London, England

Sophia Dobson Collet (1 February 1822 – 27 March 1894) was a 19th-century English feminist freethinker. She wrote under the pen name Panthea in George Holyoake's Reasoner, wrote for The Spectator and was a friend of the leading feminist Frances Power Cobbe.

== Family background ==
Sophia Dobson Collet was born Sophia Dobson in the parish of St. Pancras, London, the fifth of seven children of John Dobson (1778–1827), and his wife (and first cousin), Elizabeth Barker (1787–1875). She was described by Richard Garnett in the biography of William Johnson Fox as having attacks of a "disabling illness". Her elder brother was the Chartist radical Collet Dobson Collet (1812–1898). Another of her brothers was the engineer Edward Dobson (1816/17?–1908). She was the aunt of social reformer Clara Collet (1860–1948), who worked with Charles Booth on his great investigative work Life and Labour of the People of London; and of Sir Wilfred Collet, governor of British Honduras and British Guiana.

== South Place Ethical Chapel ==
Collet was a supporter of the South Place Ethical Chapel (now Conway Hall Ethical Society) and wrote several hymns for the organisation. Her brother Charles was its musical director. She was friends with the South Place composer Eliza Flower and Sarah Fuller Flower Adams.

It is at South Place that she came into contact with George Holyoake. She would contribute to both The Reasoner and The Movement from the 1840s to 1850s as well as have continued correspondence with Holyoake long after. She is also credited with preserving many of Fox's writings.

She wrote an appraisal of George Holyoake and his work in George Jacob Holyoake and modern atheism: a biographical and critical essay in 1855 which was well received. The book was an expanded version of what she had written as Panthea in the Free Inquirer. It echoed the same conciliatory tone between religion and non-religion that Holyoake had long espoused.

== Feminism ==
Collet remained a Unitarian even as South Place moved into a non-religious direction. However, she "condemned the oppression of women in Scripture and the subordinate position assigned to them by Christianity."

She joined the Moral Reform Union, wrote articles on women's education and supported William Thomas Stead during his imprisonment in 1885. Stead would occasionally attend lectures at South Place. Her efforts to help Josephine Butler repeal the Contagious Diseases Acts in India put a strain on her relationship with Richard Holt Hutton of The Spectator.

Her name appears on the petition for female suffrage published by The Fortnightly Review.

== Later life ==
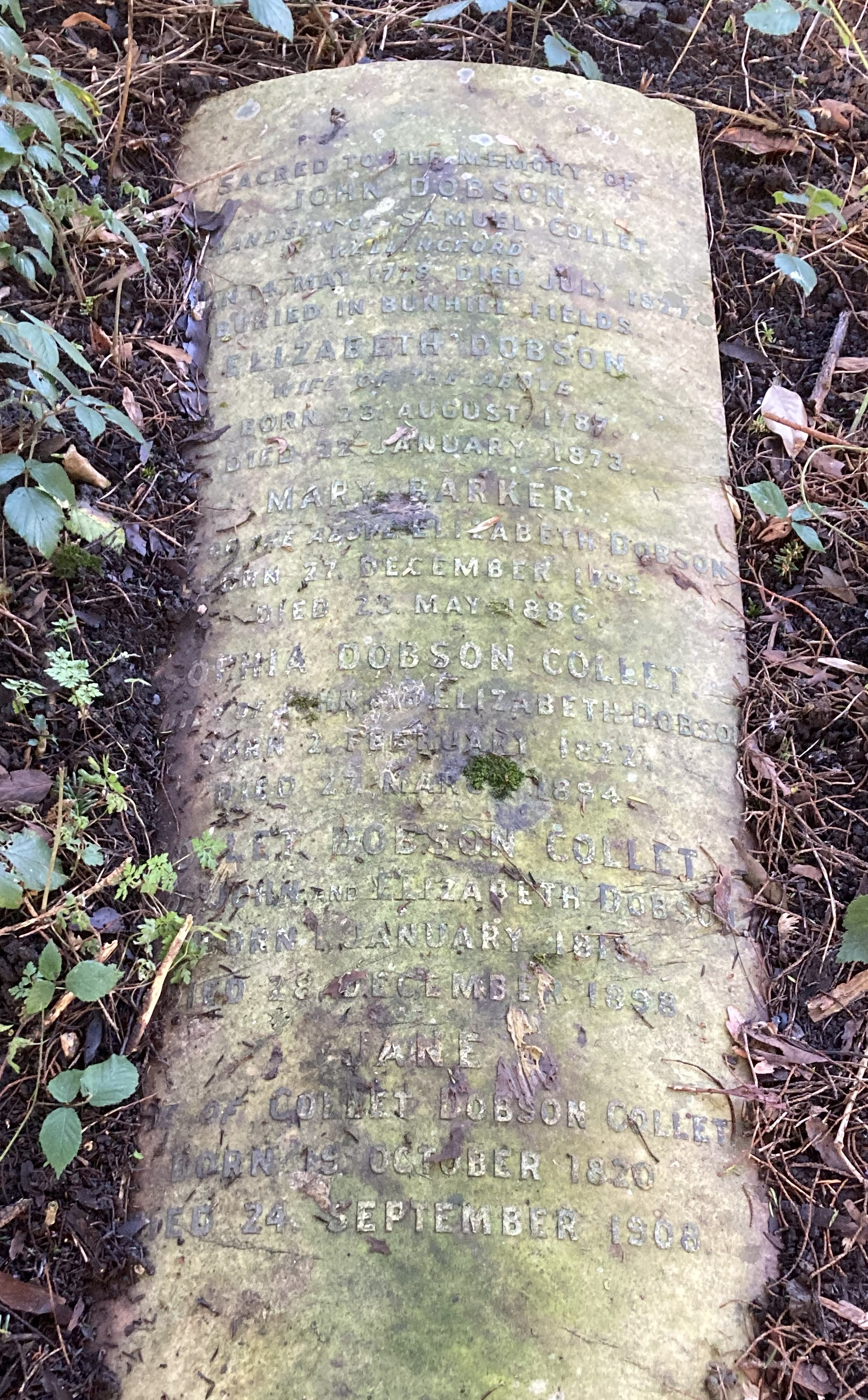
Grave of Sophia Dobson Collet in Highgate Cemetery

Collet met Ralph Waldo Emerson and had a lifelong interest in transcendentalism. Moncure D. Conway recollected in his autobiography that Ralph Waldo Emerson had asked after her as well.

She also had an interest in Brahmo Samaj and the Hindu reform movements. She published several books on this topic including The Brahmo Year-Book, Lectures and Tracts by Keshub Chunder Sen (1870), A Historical Sketch of the Brahmo Somaj (1873), Outlines and Episodes of Brahmic History (1884). F. H Stead published the Life and Letters of Raja Rammohun Roy after her death in 1900.

She is buried in the dissenters section on the west side of Highgate Cemetery.

== Publications ==
- George Jacob Holyoake and modern atheism: a biographical and critical essay (1855)
- The Brahmo Year-Book
- Lectures and Tracts by Keshub Chunder Sen (1870)
- A Historical Sketch of the Brahmo Somaj (1873)
- Outlines and Episodes of Brahmic History (1884)
