= Mark Collet =

Mark Collet may refer to:

- Sir Mark Collet, 1st Baronet (1816–1905), English merchant, banker and baronet
- Mark Wilkes Collet (1826–1863), US Civil War officer
- Sir Mark Edlmann Collet (1864–1944), of the Collet baronets
- Mark Collett (born 1980), British far-right political activist

== See also ==
- Colet
