= Thierry Collet =

Mauritian football player

Personal information
- Full name: Thierry Collet
- Date of birth: 6 September 1977 (age 49)
- Place of birth: Mauritius
- Position: Midfielder

Team information
- Current team: Pointe-aux-Sables Mates

Senior career*
Years	Team	Apps	(Gls)
2003–2008	AS Port-Louis 2000	-	(-)
2008–	Pointe-aux-Sables Mates	-	(-)

International career
2005–	Mauritius	5	(2)
- * Club domestic league appearances and goals

Thierry Collet is a Mauritian football player who currently plays for Pointe-aux-Sables Mates in the Mauritian Premier League and for the Mauritius national football team as a midfielder. He is featured on the Mauritian national team in the official 2010 FIFA World Cup video game.
