= Timeline of State Pension age in the United Kingdom =

Timeline of changes to the age at which eligible persons receive the United Kingdom State Pension.

== Timeline (1908–2030) ==
^

†
