= Mery Godigna Collet =

Venezuelan artist, writer, activist

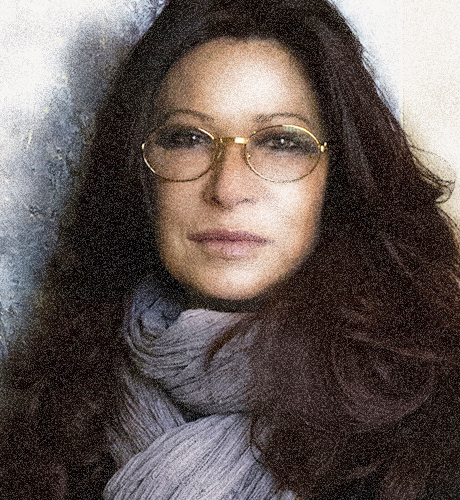

Mery Godigna Collet (born Mery Beatriz Antonieta Godigna Collet, April 8, 1959, in Caracas, Venezuela) is a Venezuelan artist, writer, philanthropist and environmental advocate living in Austin, Texas.

== Early life ==
The Godigna Collet family moved to Europe when she was 3 years old. She spent her childhood and adolescence in Spain, France and Italy. She returned to Caracas, Venezuela and studied art, design and architecture earning a bachelor's degree in architecture in 1987 from Universidad Central de Venezuela.

In the early 1970s, while living in Madrid, Spain, she attended as an unregistered student (due to her young age) to the Real Academia de Bellas Artes de San Fernando, where she discovered the power of art to communicate and promote causes.

== Artist ==
Since the beginning of her career Godigna Collet explores the coexistence between humans and environment through social and political issues. Her art work is supported by the versatile use of diverse materials, applied in installations, paintings, sculptures, photography and video, challenging the viewer through the use of new techniques and unconventional materials in the making of her art. As a minimalistic conceptualist, her own approach to the materials and techniques used in the artwork is that concepts translate through matter.

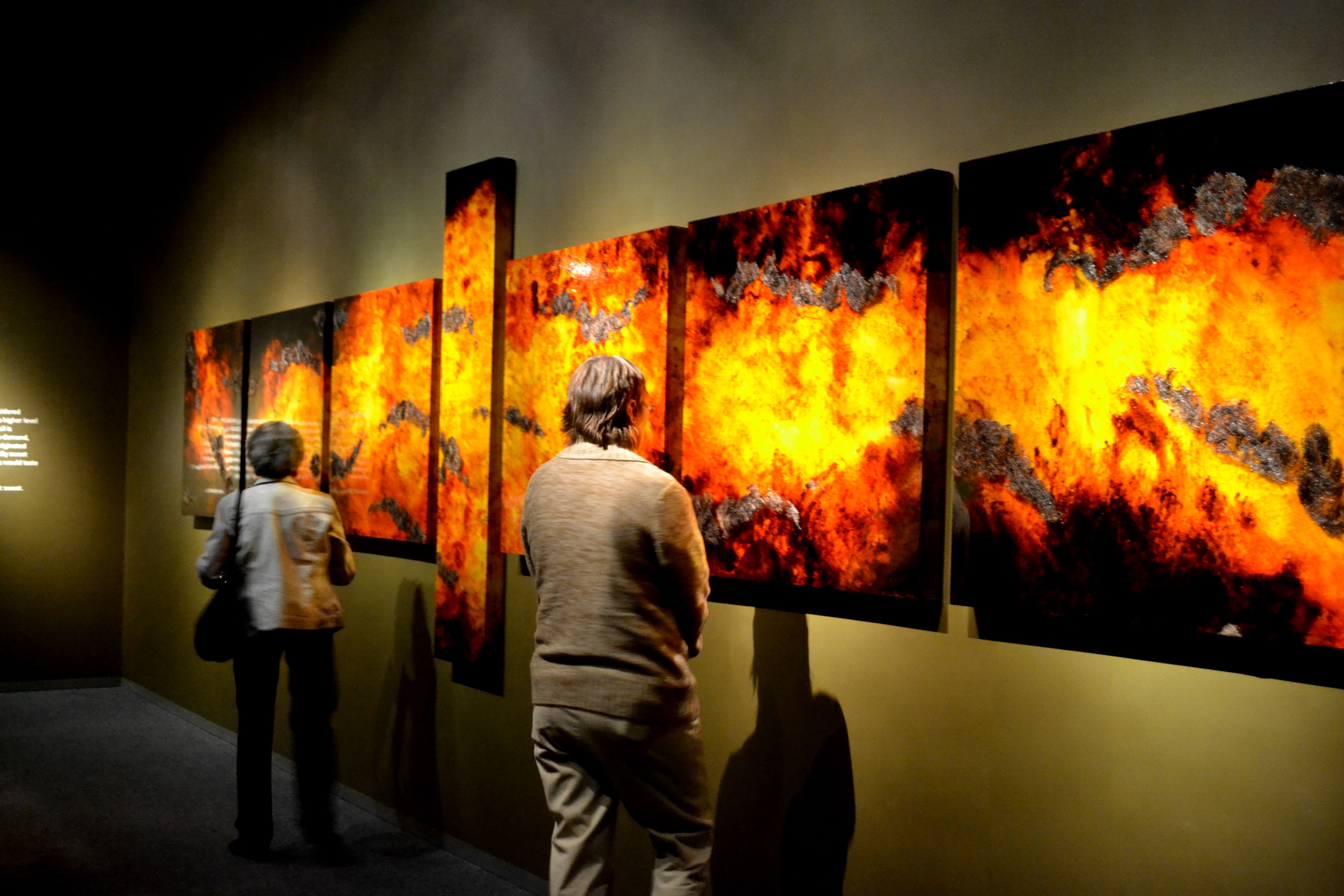
Extra Virgin Petrus Oil

=== Environmental advocate ===
Her work is based in promoting a conscious use of natural resources and technology. Since 2007, for her exhibitions she holds discussion panels pertinent to the show, that bring together the community and experts in diverse fields as well as workshops which promote ecological awareness. During interviews on radio, television or magazines, she makes a call for reflection over environmental issues. In 2012 her work was selected to be displayed and to be the image of a conference about issues of dependence on oil as an energy source and on the human rights consequences of that reliance, held at the University of Texas at Austin organized by the Center for Global Energy, International Arbitration, and Environmental Law and the Bernard and Audre Rapoport Center for Human Rights and Justice. In 2016 her artwork "Let's Talk Volume" was selected by the City of Austin, Texas through the program of Art in Public Places, to be installed for the occasion of celebrating International Environment Day.

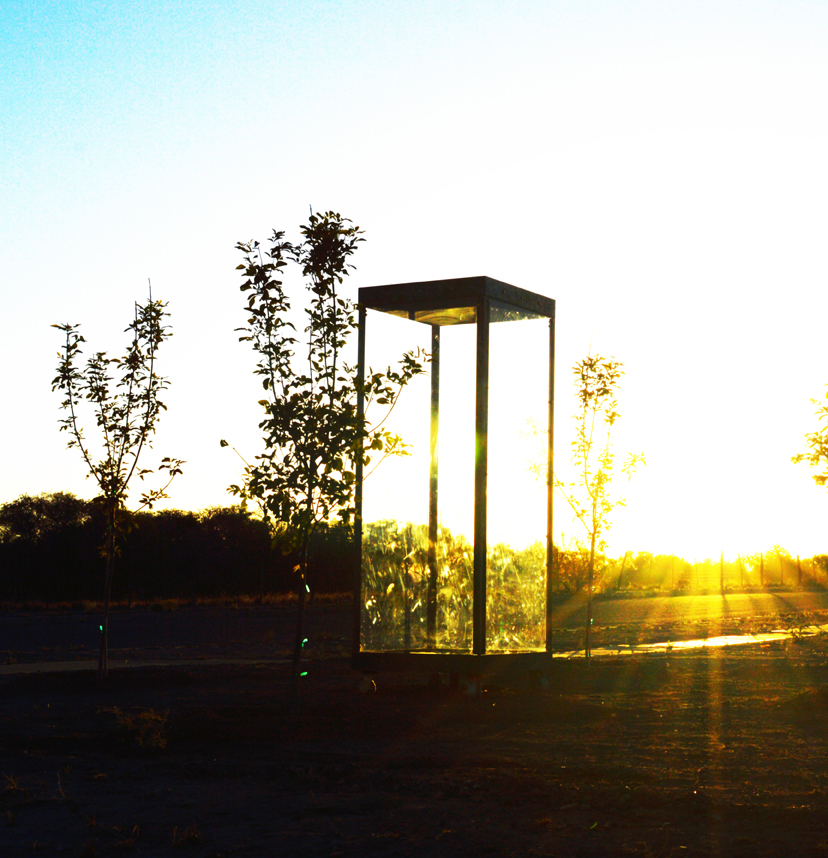

=== Philanthropist ===
Through her art and its visual power to provoke thought, Godigna Collet support several causes related to human rights. From Venezuela, Miami, Italy and Texas, she had shown her work to raise funds to promote support for women and children victims of violence, residencies for artists in need, victims of AIDS and indigenous populations.

In 2007 she traveled extensively through the Venezuelan Amazon collecting several legends from indigenous cultural lore, that traditionally are transmitted orally from one generation to the next.

Insuring their documentation and preservation she has organized exhibitions about the subject in Venezuela, Italy, France and the United States, and has preserved them at the archives of the Nettie Lee Benson Latin American Collection at the University of Texas at Austin, and she gives free lectures about the subject.

=== Writer ===
Mery Godigna Collet has published in limited edition and in Spanish two books; "Nightly Exercises Notebook" (1995) and "Made with Fiber" (2003), and three art research studies "Matter, Time, and Space" (1997), "Metallic Light" (2006), "Extra Virgin Petrus Oil", 2008.

She collaborated with Le Club monthly magazine in Caracas, Venezuela, La Gazette du Jeudi, weekly publication in Paris France, and currently contributes to Viceversa magazine in New York.

== Career ==
Mery Godigna Collet has participated in 26 solo and 36 group exhibitions in Venezuela, Colombia, Mexico, Spain, Italy, France, Germany, the Netherlands, Belgium, New York, Miami, New Mexico and Texas.

In 1985 and 1986 she was an assistant professor in Design 07 and Taller Ventrillon (hand free drawing) at Universidad Central.

In 1990 she founded the utilitarian art firm Neo-Arkhos and served as Director until 1994 promoting contemporary designers. From 2007 to 2009 she served as Director for Fundaya Foundation a nonprofit organization whose mission was to aid indigenous populations in Venezuela. Since 2014 is part of the Board of International Woman's Foundation based in Marfa, Texas, that provides residencies for artists and promotes their work.

In 2014 she co-founded the "Crosswalk Project" to improve pedestrian and handicap safety for the urban environment. She has given several art lectures and workshops in Venezuela, Texas and Italy. She is a member of the Accademia di Arte di la Citta di Ferrara, Italy and of Mexic-Arte Museum in Austin Texas.

=== Solo exhibitions ===
- 1995 Dimelo Tu. Galeria El Muro, Caracas, Venezuela
- 1996 Blue. Galeria El Muro, Caracas, Venezuela
- 1997 Retratos. Galeria Ars Forum, Caracas, Venezuela
- 1998 De Suenos, Ilusiones, Laberintos y Temores, Galeria Ars Forum, Caracas, Venezuela
- 2000 Penelope's Tapestries. Venezuelan Consulate in N.Y., N.Y.
- 2000 Penelope's Tapestries. Eastern National Bank, Miami, Florida
- 2001 Aqua. 1221 Brickell Ave. Miami, FL
- 2002 Windows. Galeria Punto de Arte, Caracas, Venezuela
- 2002 Windows. Museo del Discurso de Angostura, Ciudad Bolivar, Venezuela
- 2003 En Tono de Fibra. Sala de Arte Sidor (Siderurgica del Orinoco) Puerto Ordaz, Venezuela
- 2007 Mares Metalicos. Monumento Historico La Rocca, Cento, Italy
- 2007 Mares Metalicos. Galleria Il Carbone, Ferrara, Italy
- 2008 Mares Metalicos. Gallerie Expression Libre, Paris, France
- 2011 Extra Virgin Petrus Oil. Petroleum Museum, TX
- 2012 Extra Virgin Petrus Oil. Rapoport Center for Human Rights & Energy Center University of Texas, Austin, Texas
- 2012 El Dorado. Benson Collection University of Texas, Austin, Texas
- 2012 El Dorado. Delizia di Belriguardo, Ferrara, Italy
- 2013 Extra Virgin Petrus Oil. Nina Torres Fine Art Miami, FL
- 2013 Evpo. Caridi Gallery, Miami, Florida
- 2014 Marfa's Phantoms. Historic Landmark & Museum Building 98, Marfa, Texas
- 2014 Extra Virgin Petrus Oil. LUHCA, Lubbock, Texas
- 2014 Wandering Skin. OBE, Austin, Texas
- 2015 No Particular Shape. Ferrara, Italy, presented by Galleria Dil Carbone. Ferrara, Italy
- 2015 Evpo. Greasewood Gallery, Marfa, Texas
- 2015 Extra Virgin Petrus Oil. Warehouse 1–10, Magdalena, New Mexico
- 2016 "Petro Poems" ESB-MACC, Austin, Texas

=== Museum collections ===
- MexicArte Museum, Austin TX
- Museo de Arte Contemporáneo del Zulia, Maracaibo, Venezuela.
- Latin American Art Museum, Miami, Florida.
- Galleria D'Arte Moderno di Cento, Bologna, Italy
- Petroleum Museum, Midland, Texas
