= Collet Dobson Collet =

English radical freethinker, Chartist and campaigner

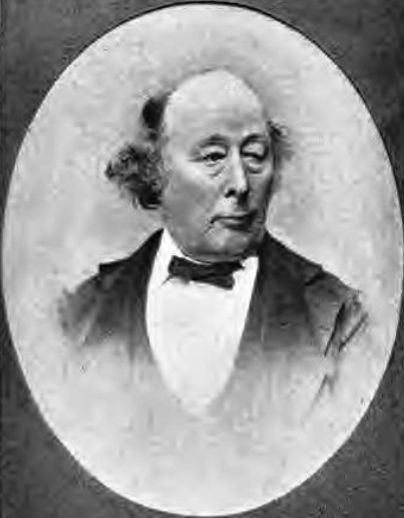
- Collet Dobson Collet from the frontispiece of A History of the Taxes on Knowledge
- Born: Collet Dobson; 31 December 1812; London
- Died: 28 December 1898 (aged 85); Finsbury
- Other name: Dobson Collet
- Occupations: Music teacher, editor
- Spouse: M. McKenzie (m. 1838–1840) Jane Marshall (m. 1846)
- Children: 5, including Wilfred and Clara
- Relatives: Edward Dobson (brother); Sophia Dobson Collet (sister)

Collet Dobson Collet (31 December 1812 – 28 December 1898) was an English radical freethinker, Chartist and campaigner against newspaper taxation.

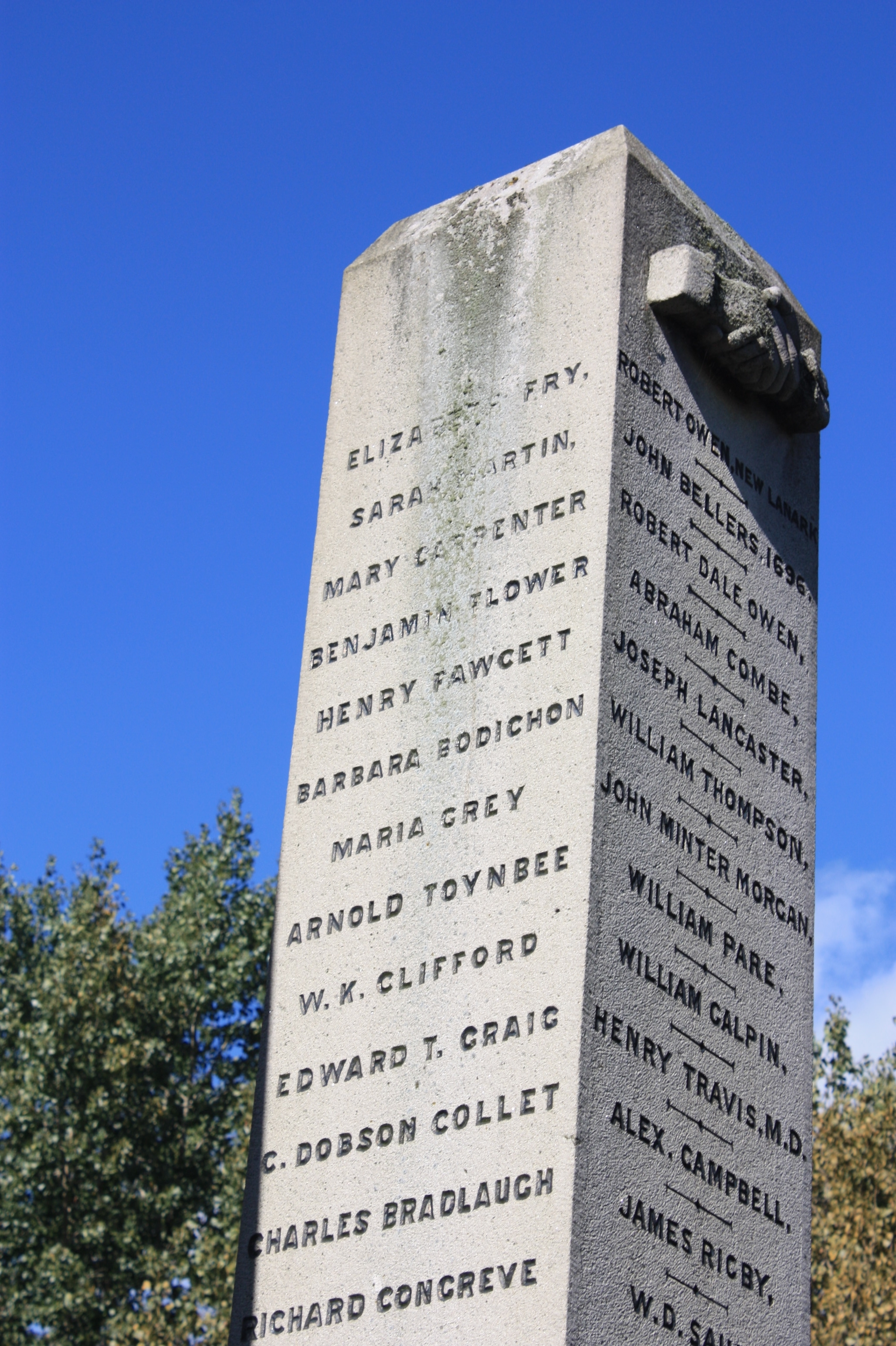
Collet's name on the Reformers Monument, Kensal Green Cemetery

== Background and work ==
Collet was born in London on 31 December 1812, the son of John Dobson (1778–1827), a London merchant, and his wife Elizabeth Barker (1787–1875). His sister was the writer and feminist Sophia Dobson Collet (1822–1894). His brother was the engineer Edward Dobson (1816–1908).

After abandoning a career in the law due to lack of money, Collet became director of music at South Place Chapel and was heavily involved in the Chartist movement. He became Secretary of the People's Charter Union, and of the Newspaper Stamp Abolition Committee (i.e. to overturn the Stamp Act) in 1849. From 1851 - 1870 he was Secretary of the Association for the Repeal of the Taxes on Knowledge.

In 1866 he became editor of The Diplomatic Review. This had been known as The Free Press prior to Collet taking it over and was a mouthpiece for the views of David Urquhart. Collet invited radicals to contribute to the Diplomatic Review and as a result began publishing articles by Karl Marx. The two became great friends and weekly meetings were held at each other's houses at which Shakespeare readings were given by members of their families. These meetings became formalised as the Dogberry Club. Marx's daughter Eleanor and Collet's daughter, Clara Collet, amongst others, became heavily involved in the readings.

His five children included the colonial administrator Wilfred Collet (1856–1929) and the educationalist Clara Collet (1860–1948). He died 1898 in Finsbury, and is buried in Highgate West Cemetery. His wife, Jane Collet (1820–1908), died 10 years after him.

== Publications ==
- Vocal Rudiments. Aus: The Musical Times and Singing Class Circular, 1847. Digitalisat Jstor
- Vocal Rudiments. Part II (Continued). Aus: The Musical Times and Singing Class Circular, 1849. Digitalisat Jstor
- The invasion of France not a war of self-defence. The case against Prussia. Analyses of the "correspondence preliminary to the war". London 1870 (Reprinted from the "Anglo American Times").
- Reasons for the repeal of the railway passenger duty. Paper read in the rooms of the Society of Arts, 26th February, 1877. In: Some words on railway legislation. Waterlow and Sons, London 1877.
- Life and career of Mr. Richard Moore. With a short sketch of his struggles for political, social and religious freedom. Charles Watt, London 1878.
- Calm is the glassy ocean, translation of the chorus Placido è il mar from Mozart's opera Idomeneo. Novello & Company, London 1891. Digitalisat Internet Archive
- A History of the Taxes on Knowledge their origin and repeal. With an introduction by George Jacob Holyoake. T. Fisher Unwin, London 1899. 2 vols. Digitalisat Internet Archive vol. 1; Digitalisat Internet Archive vol. 2
