= Maungatapu murders =

Series of murders in New Zealand

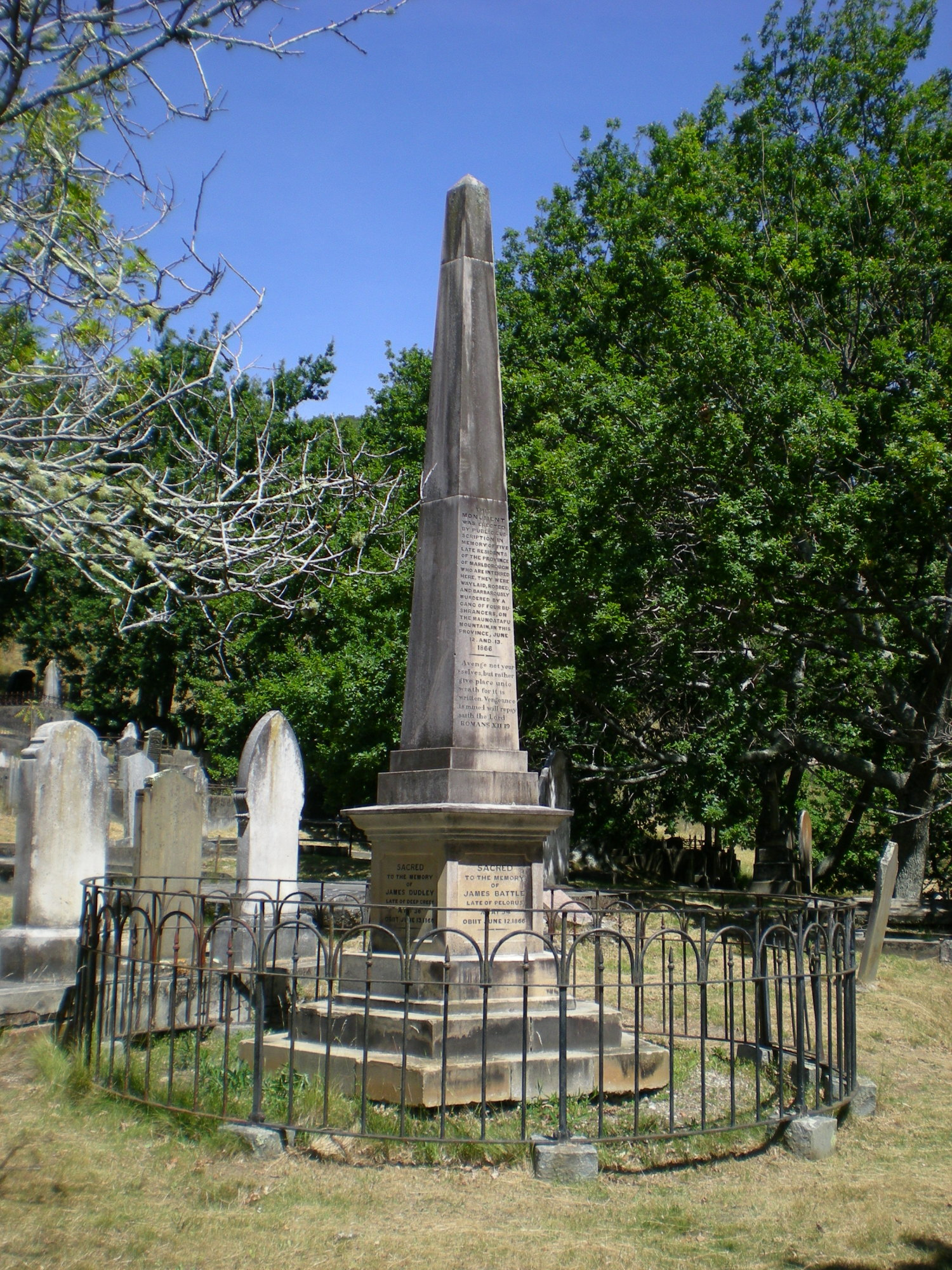
The Maungatapu Monument for the five victims of the murders in Wakapuaka Cemetery

The Maungatapu murders took place on 12 and 13 June 1866 on the Maungatapu track near Nelson, South Island, New Zealand, in two separate attacks that killed five people. Four people were charged with the murders; one was pardoned after giving information which allowed the other three to be convicted and hanged. The group of four, dubbed the Burgess Gang or Burgess-Kelly Gang, was composed of Richard Burgess, Joseph Thomas Sullivan, Philip Levy, and Thomas Kelly (birth name Thomas Noon). The victims were James Battle, George Dudley, John Kempthorne, James de Pontius, and Felix Mathieu.

== The Burgess Gang ==
The initial members of the gang were Richard Burgess (originally known as Richard Hill) and Thomas Kelly (originally known as Thomas Noon).

Burgess was born in London, England, on 14 February 1829. He lived with his mother and never knew his biological father as he was born illegitimate. In his early teens, Burgess was convicted of pickpocketing and robbery, and was ultimately sentenced to transportation to New South Wales, Australia, in 1847. In 1862, Burgess emigrated to New Zealand to participate in the Otago gold rush to New Zealand and joined up with Kelly, whom he had already met in jail in Australia. The two were soon arrested and sentenced to 3.5 years in Dunedin Gaol. Released in September 1865, they were escorted to the border of the Otago province.

In Hokitika, Burgess and Kelly met and formed a partnership with Joseph Thomas Sullivan. Burgess had previous business with Philip Levy in Australia and New Zealand. In Greymouth, Burgess and Levy became closer as they did more deals. The group set sail to Nelson and landed on 6 June 1866 with the objective to rob several banks in the area, however for various reasons these goals were abandoned. The gang ended up in Canvastown, a village east of Nelson which was exclusively accessed through the Maungatapu track.

== The murders ==
The epitaph on the Maungatapu Monument

The murders occurred on 12 and 13 June 1866. A few days before, Levy had learned from locals that four businessmen were moving all their gold and money to the bank in Nelson. The four businessmen all knew each other and planned to make the journey together on 12 June. The gang planned to hold up the group with a large number of weapons so they would surrender without resistance, and then rob and kill them. They estimated that the group could have a total of 1000 pounds of money and gold.

The gang stationed themselves on a suitable site along the Maungatapu track, a place now called Murderers' Rock. On 12 June, James Battle, a flax grower, had terminated his employment and was returning to Nelson via the Maungatapu track. At first the gang let him pass, but later caught up to Battle and robbed him of three pounds and 16 shillings; afterward they strangled him and buried him in a shallow grave.

The following day at approximately 1:00 pm, Dudley, Kempthorne, de Pontius, and Mathieu (accompanied by a horse with a pack) were held up by the gang. The victims immediately surrendered and were bound and moved off the track. After they were robbed (the takings were only 80 pounds per gang member), they were all killed, first Dudley, by strangulation. Kempthorne was shot along with de Pontius. Mathieu was shot, then stabbed, then shot again. Three of the bodies were hidden, but that of de Pontius was covered with rocks: if the bodies were ever found, they reasoned, de Pontius would be missing and the first conclusion would be that de Pontius committed the crime. The gang then shot the horse through the head and let the animal slide down off a bank into vegetation. Other belongings such as clothes were burnt in a derelict house, and the gang returned to Nelson that night.

== The arrest ==
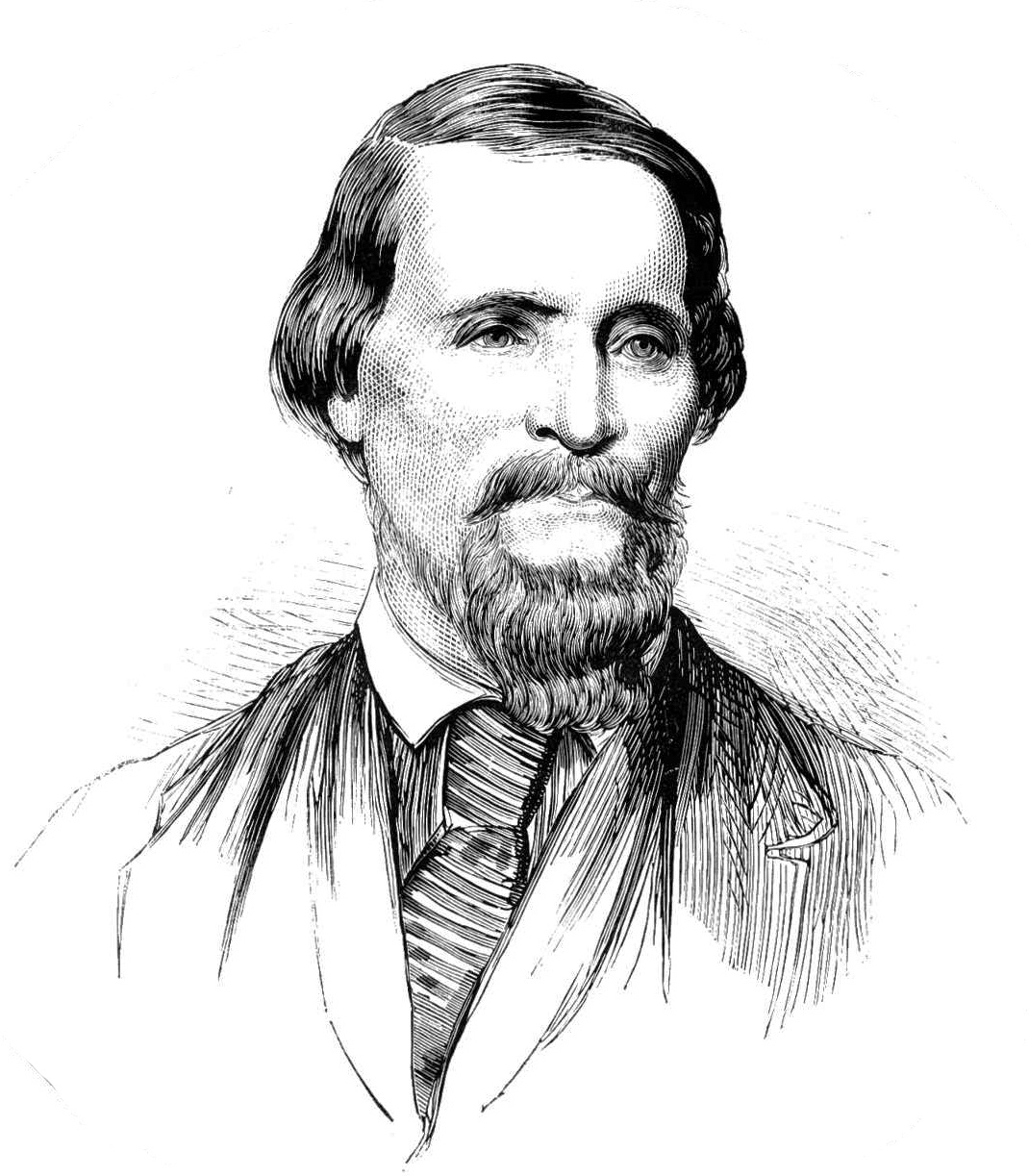
Joseph Sullivan, 1874 engraving

Unknown to the gang a friend of the victims, Heinrich Moller was planning to meet the Mathieu party in Nelson to return the horse to Canvastown, however when Moller did not see or catch up on the group on the track or in Nelson that evening, he asked other friends and hotels if they had seen the group. Moller had to return to Canvastown after several days of waiting, and informed the locals of his story. George Jevis rode to Nelson immediately to inform the police, as his thoughts dwelled on foul play. On 18 June the investigation began, and in the evening Levy was arrested. 19 June Burgess, Sullivan, and Kelly were all arrested for suspicion of murder. The police were able to come to this conclusion because witnesses had seen the gang arrive in Nelson with little money, Levy paid all fees. After the gang returned to Nelson they drank and gambled with little restraint. 20 June the horse was found along with a shotgun by the search party. On the 28th Sullivan made a full statement after seeing a reward from the administration of justice. The reward was a free pardon as an accomplice and 200 pounds. After this information, on the 29th the bodies of the Mathieu group were found. Sullivan also informed the police of Battle's murder, until this time Battle's absence had not been reported. On 3 July Battle's body was found. The victims were buried in Wakapuaka Cemetery in a mass grave. The funeral was the largest in Nelson ever. On 9 August Burgess gave a confession which admitted his own guilt and tried to incriminate Sullivan and attempted to free Levy and Kelly of the charges.

== The trial ==
The trial started on 12 September and ended on 18 September. The jury found Burgess, Levy, and Kelly guilty of murder and sentenced to death by hanging. Sullivan was given immunity after giving information. A second trial was started on 18 September which tried Sullivan for the murder of James Battle. This was very unusual, Sullivan gave the information which led to Battle's murder being discovered. Sullivan was not granted immunity for this separate crime. Sullivan was found guilty of murder and also sentenced to death by hanging. Two weeks later Sullivan's death sentence was withdrawn to a life sentence of imprisonment.

== The execution ==
Nelson had never had a murder case before this case. Gallows were specially constructed which allowed three men to be hanged simultaneously. A hangman was summoned from Wellington. 5 October was the date of execution. At approximately 8:30 am Burgess, Levy, and Kelly were hanged. Burgess and Levy died instantly, however Kelly choked. Death masks were made of heads of the convicted for the pseudoscience of phrenology. It is unknown what occurred with the bodies, and there are many urban legends about the burial of the three bodies.

== Fate of Sullivan ==
Sullivan shipped to Dunedin, where he served seven years of his life sentence. A conditional pardon was granted where he was to leave New Zealand and never return. He was also unable to go to any Australian colonies, although he did travel to Victoria to see his wife and children, and seemed intent on settling there. He became a pariah due to his criminal past, and earned the abhorrence of the bushranger Ned Kelly, who regarded Sullivan as an "infernal scoundrel" and "one of the greatest villains unhung" for turning Queen's evidence, and claimed to have pursued him across Victoria in early 1879 with the intention of torturing and killing him.

Sullivan's ultimate fate remains a mystery. There are reports that he eventually returned to New Zealand and died in Auckland on 16 September 1921, although this is debated.

== See also ==
- List of massacres in New Zealand
