= Maungatapu =

Mountain in the Bryant Range, New Zealand

Coordinates: 41°19′00.41″S 173°24′59.55″E

Maungatapu is a mountain in New Zealand located on the border of the Nelson, New Zealand and Marlborough Regions. It lies in the Bryant Range. The mountain is 1014 metres high. Maungatapu is Māori for "sacred mountain". The mountain was the location of the infamous Maungatapu murders.

The Maungatapu saddle is the main route for electrical power lines from Nelson to Marlborough. The mountain has a rough track which links Pelorus Bridge with the Maitai Valley. This is used for mountain biking and walking only. Driving and motorcycling have been banned by Nelson City Council since 2010 but reopened in 2024.
