= Richard Burgess (murderer) =

New Zealand outlaw (1829–1866)

- Born: Richard S. Hill; 14 February 1829; West End, London, England
- Died: 5 October 1866 (aged 37); Nelson, New Zealand
- Cause of death: Execution by hanging
- Occupations: Stonemason (briefly); Career criminal
- Penalty: Death by hanging

Details
- Date: 12–13 June 1866; 12 June: Unknown time 13 June: Around 1pm
- Locations: Maungatapu track, south-east of Nelson
- Target: Travellers near the summit of the Maungatapu Track
- Killed: Four (the accused originally boasted no fewer than nine murders)

Richard S. Burgess (14 February 1829 – 5 October 1866) was a murderer known for the "Maungatapu murders" which occurred on the Maungatapu track, south-east of Nelson, New Zealand.

Born Richard Hill in west London in 1829, reputedly the illegitimate son of a guards officer and a lady's companion, he became involved in petty street crime at age 14 and was soon jailed and flogged for pickpocketing. Two years later he was sentenced to 15 years' transportation for burglary. After 20 months of solitary confinement he was shipped to Melbourne, Australia, arriving in September 1847.

In 1852, he was sentenced to 10 years of imprisonment for armed highway robbery, and he was released in October 1861. He was calling himself Burgess, the name of a New South Wales runholder he had attempted to steal from. He left Australia in January 1862 for New Zealand and the Otago gold rush. On 12 June 1866, James Battle was murdered on the Maungatapu track by Burgess and four others, known as the 'Burgess gang'. The following day four other men were killed nearby. In court Burgess boasted of committing nine murders; he wrote his memoirs while awaiting trial. He was executed in Nelson Gaol at around 8:30 a.m. on 5 October 1866.
