= Colet =

Colet is a surname. Notable people with the surname include:

- Charles-Théodore Colet (1806–1883), French Roman Catholic Archbishop
- Colet Abedi (21st century), Iranian-American writer and producer
- John Colet (1467–1519), English churchman and educational pioneer
- Louise Colet (1810–1876), French poet

== See also ==
- Colet (singer), a member of Filipino girl group Bini
- Colette (disambiguation)
