= Clara Collet =

British academic

- Born: Clara Elizabeth Collet; 10 September 1860
- Died: 3 August 1948 (aged 87)
- Occupations: Economist, civil servant

Clara Elizabeth Collet (10 September 1860 – 3 August 1948) was a British economist and civil servant. She was one of the first women graduates from the University of London and was pivotal in many reforms which greatly improved working conditions and pay for women during the early part of the twentieth century. She is also noted for the collection of statistical and descriptive evidence on the life of working women and poor people in London and elsewhere in England.

== Education ==
Collet attended North London Collegiate School. When finishing her education at the Collegiate School in 1878, she was recommended by the founder of the school, Frances Buss, to work as assistant mistress at the newly founded Wyggeston Girls' School in Leicester, later to become Regent College. Her salary was £80 and she got herself coached by masters from the boy's grammar school in Greek and applied mathematics.

Collet also enrolled at University College London and in 1880 graduated with a Bachelor of Arts degree, making her one of the first women graduates from the University of London. In October 1885 Collet moved to College Hall, on Gordon Square, and started to study for a master's degree in Moral and Political Philosophy, which included psychology and economics. While studying at University College London she took the Teacher's Diploma. In 1886 she and Henry Higgs were jointly awarded the Joseph Hume Scholarship in Political Economy. Collet was awarded an M.A. in 1887.

== Documenting women's work ==
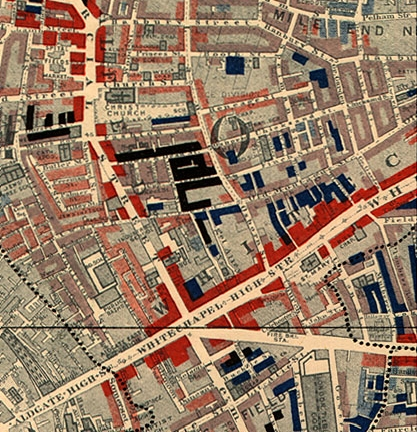
Booth's 1889 poverty map showing Whitechapel in the London East End. The red areas are "well-to-do" and black areas are the "lowest class...occasional labourers, street sellers, loafers, criminals and semi-criminals".

After completion of her master's degree she worked for Charles Booth helping in his great investigative work on the conditions prevailing in late nineteenth century London. To this end she took up residency in the East End during the autumn of 1888. She was working on a chapter on women's work in Booth's survey Life and Labour of the People of London.

Booth had planned for a chapter on women's work in his survey. In 1887 Alice Stopford Green started the investigation on women's work and wages, but in November 1888 she left Booth's project. Booth asked Beatrice Webb if she could complete the women's work study by March 1889. Webb was working on the study of the Jewish community, which had to be completed in February. Records show that Collet started work on the women's work survey in late November. It is not documented how Collet was recruited to Booth's team. Webb and Collet had a mutual friend, Eleanor Marx, and Collet had in 1887 attended the Toynbee Hall conference on women's work and wages, which had also been attended by Booth. Collet was formally employed by Booth in late 1888 and took over Green's study of women's work in the East End of London and contributed to Graham Balfour's study of Battersea Street. In 1890 she studied the Ashby-de-la-Zouch workhouse for Booth's work on the Poor Law Unions.

In her diaries Collet recorded that "this investigative work has many drawbacks... I would give it up and will give it up whenever I see a chance of earning a certain £60 even by lectures on economics". While working for Booth she coached girls and occasionally stood in for Henry Higgs to give lectures on economics at Toynbee Hall. Collet ended her employment with Booth in 1892. She remained close to Booth and her former colleagues. In 1904 she and her former colleagues attended Booth's celebratory dinner in 1904. In 1931 she contributed data on domestic service to Hubert Llewellyn Smith's New Survey of London Life and Labour.

== Civil service career ==
Collet joined the Civil Service and worked with the Board of Trade to introduce many reforms, including the introduction of the Old Age Pension and labour exchanges (employment bureaux). During these years she worked with well-known politicians such as David Lloyd George, Ramsay MacDonald, William Beveridge and Winston Churchill.

With the support of Charles Booth she initially joined the civil service as Assistant Commissioner for the Royal Commission on Labour. In 1893 she secured a permanent post as Senior Investigator for Women's Industries at the Labour Department of the Board of Trade. Collet retired from the civil service in 1920 and became an active member of the Royal Economic Society and the Royal Statistical Society.

== Private life ==
Her family became acquainted with Karl Marx and Clara became especially friendly with his daughter Eleanor Marx. Collet was a friend of George Gissing during the last ten years of his life (they first met in July 1893), and she offered to act as guardian to his two sons when it became clear his second wife, Edith, would find it hard to cope financially after his death. At this time she also became engaged in a long disagreement with H. G. Wells over the foreword of Gissing's posthumously published novel Veranilda.

== Publications ==
For Charles Booth's survey Life and Labour of the People of London Collet authored Secondary Education; Girls, West End Tailoring (Women), Women's Work and Report on the Money Wages of Indoor Domestic Servants. Collet remained interested in the study of women's work for the rest of her life and published articles on the economic position of women. Such as:

- The Economic Position of Educated Working Women (1902)
- Women in Industry (1911)
- Changes in Wages and Conditions of Domestic Servants in private Families and Institutions in the County of London Collet & Daphne Sanger (1930)
